= 2006 Houston Texans season =

5th season in franchise history; first under coach Gary Kubiak

- Owner: Bob McNair
- General manager: Rick Smith
- Head coach: Gary Kubiak
- Offensive coordinator: Troy Calhoun
- Defensive coordinator: Richard Smith
- Home stadium: Reliant Stadium

Results
- Record: 6–10
- Division place: 4th AFC South
- Playoffs: Did not qualify
- Pro Bowlers: WR Andre Johnson

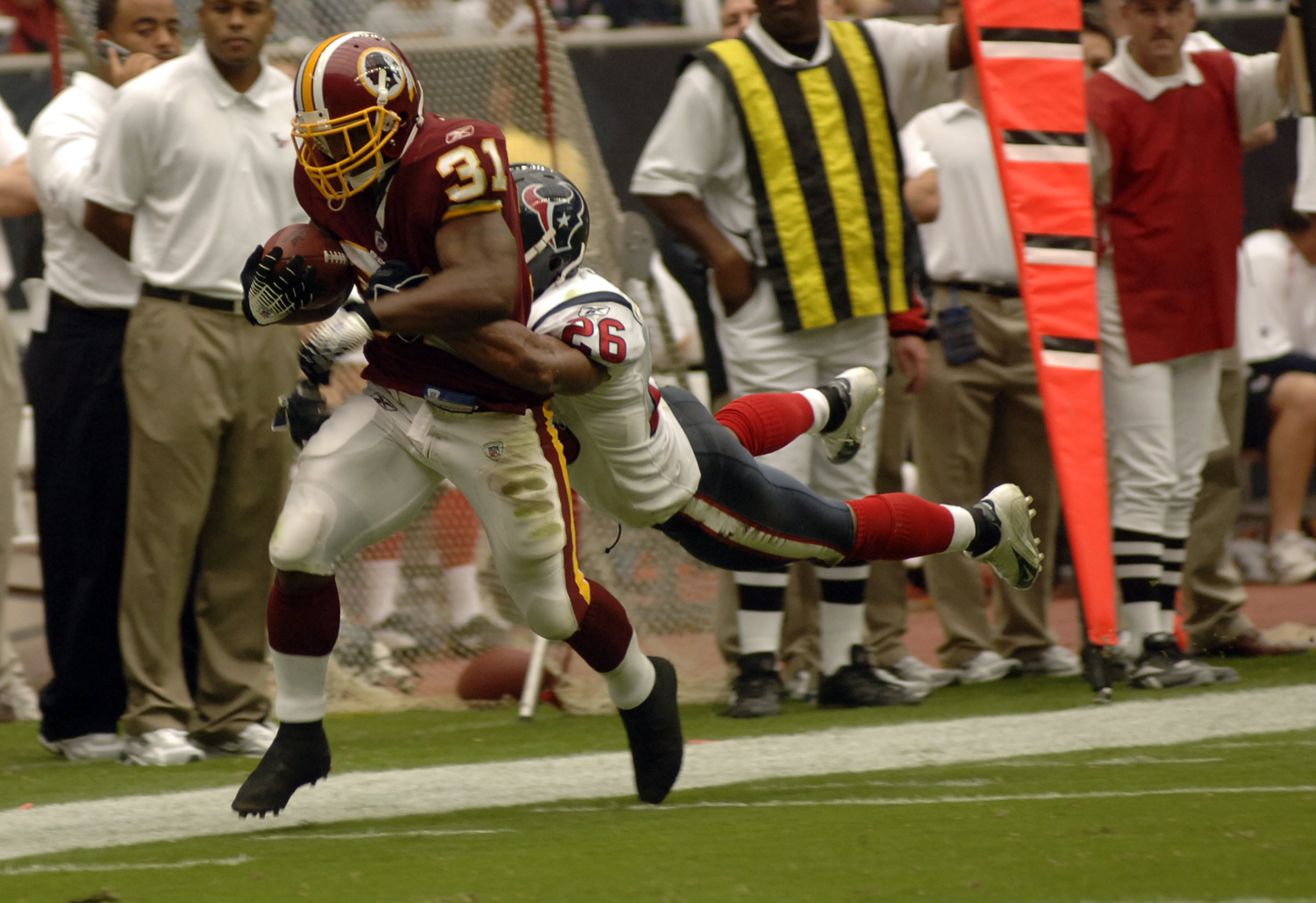
Washington's Rock Cartwright is tackled by Houston's Glenn Earl, week 3 in 2006

The 2006 Houston Texans season was the franchise's 5th season in the National Football League (NFL) and the 1st under head coach Gary Kubiak. The team improved on their 2–14 record in 2005 and finished 6–10, a four-game improvement over their previous season.

== Offseason ==
On January 2, 2006, the day after the last game of the 2005 season, head coach Dom Capers and most of the coaching staff was fired by owner Bob McNair. General Manager Charley Casserly was spared, but would eventually resign in May. On January 22, 2006, Bob McNair announced that Denver Broncos offensive coordinator Gary Kubiak would become the Texans' second head coach. Kubiak, a Houston native, was a candidate for the job in 2001 before the team chose Dom Capers. On June 5, 2006, the Texans hired Denver Broncos assistant general manager Rick Smith as Casserly's successor.

=== Player additions and subtractions ===
Additions:

- DE Anthony Weaver
- LB Sam Cowart (later released before season start)
- RB Ron Dayne
- WR Eric Moulds (trade with Buffalo Bills)
- S Dexter McCleon
- DE N.D. Kalu
- G Brad Bedell
- WR Kevin Walter
- TE Jeb Putzier
- C Ephraim Salaam
- WR Derrick Lewis
- S Guss Scott
- S Dexter Wynn
- RB Samkon Gado
- DT Thomas Johnson
- C Mike Flanagan

Subtractions:

- WR Jabar Gaffney
- TE Bennie Joppru
- RB Moran Norris
- CB Jason Bell
- G Milford Brown
- C Tyson Walter
- RB Vernand Morency
- QB Tony Banks
- FB Jonathan Wells
- WR Donovan Morgan
- WR Corey Bradford

=== Draft ===
2006 Houston Texans draft
Round	Pick	Player	Position	College	Notes
1	1	Mario Williams *	DE	NC State	
2	33	DeMeco Ryans *	LB	Alabama	
3	65	Charles Spencer	OT	Pittsburgh	
3	66	Eric Winston	OT	Miami (FL)	Pick from NO
4	98	Owen Daniels *	TE	Wisconsin	
6	170	Wali Lundy	RB	Virginia	
7	251	David Anderson	WR	Colorado St	
Made roster † Pro Football Hall of Fame * Made at least one Pro Bowl during career

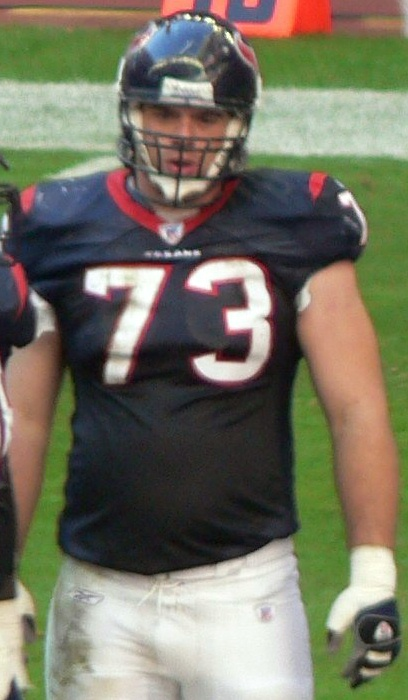
Texans' offensive tackle Eric Winston, 2006

With their 2–14 record in 2005, the Texans earned the right to the first selection in the 2006 NFL draft. Leading up to the draft most believed the team would select RB Reggie Bush out of University of Southern California, who was being compared to Gale Sayers and touted as the greatest prospect to ever enter the draft. Many local fans in Houston wanted the team to draft hometown hero Vince Young who had led the University of Texas to a Nation Championship in January. However, the Texans would choose neither and announced the day before the draft that they would pick defensive end Mario Williams out of NC State instead. Williams was signed to a six-year, $54 million contract.

The pick both shocked and angered fans and the team was ripped by the national media for making what many believed was one of the worst mistakes in NFL Draft history. With the first selection in the second round they selected Alabama linebacker DeMeco Ryans. Ryans would prove to be a steal as he would eventually be named the Defensive Rookie of the Year for 2006. The rest of their picks included Pittsburgh offensive tackle Charles Spencer, Miami (FL) offensive tackle Eric Winston, Wisconsin tight end Owen Daniels, Virginia running back Wali Lundy, and Colorado St. wide receiver David Anderson.

Despite the fact that many believed drafting Mario Williams was a mistake, the Texans would go on to have the best draft classes of any team in 2006 according to most experts. Young and Bush did not live up to pre-draft expectations, while Williams would be selected to multiple Pro Bowls.

== Staff ==
2006 Houston Texans staff
Front office: Founder, chairman and chief executive officer – Bob McNair; Vice chairman – Philip Burguières; President of business operations – Jamey Rootes; General manager – Rick Smith; Vice president of football administration – Dan Ferens; Associate director of pro scouting – Bobby Grier; Associate director of pro scouting – Miller McCalmon; Director of college scouting – Dale Strahm; Coordinator of college scouting – Mike Maccagnan; Head coaches: Head coach – Gary Kubiak; Assistant head coach/offense – Mike Sherman; Offensive coaches: Offensive coordinator/quarterbacks – Troy Calhoun; Running backs – Chick Harris; Wide receivers – Kyle Shanahan; Tight ends – Brian Pariani; Offensive line – John Benton; Offensive assistant – Tim Bender; Offensive assistant – Mike McDaniel	Defensive coaches: Defensive coordinator – Richard Smith; Defensive line – Bob Karmelowicz; Assistant defensive line – Tracy Simien; Linebackers – Johnny Holland; Defensive backs – Jon Hoke; Assistant defensive backs – Martin Bayless; Defensive assistant – Perry Carter; Defensive assistant – Robert Saleh; Special teams coaches: Special teams – Joe Marciano; Administrative coordinator/coaching assistant – Richard Hightower; Strength and conditioning: Strength and conditioning – Dan Riley; Assistant strength and conditioning – Ray Wright

== Roster ==
2006 Houston Texans roster
Quarterbacks (QB): 8 David Carr; 5 Quinton Porter; 11 Bradlee Van Pelt; Running backs (RB): 36 Ron Dayne; 35 Samkon Gado; 44 Vonta Leach FB; 33 Wali Lundy; 27 Chris Taylor; Wide receivers (WR): 19 Charlie Adams; 14 David Anderson; 80 Andre Johnson; 84 Eric Moulds; 85 Kevin Walter; Tight ends (TE): 87 Mark Bruener; 81 Owen Daniels; 88 Jeb Putzier	Offensive linemen (OL): 68 Brad Bedell G; 55 Drew Hodgdon C; 62 Scott Jackson C; 76 Steve McKinney C; 69 Chester Pitts G; 74 Ephraim Salaam OT; 70 Fred Weary G; 73 Eric Winston OT; Defensive linemen (DL): 93 Jason Babin DE; 79 Tim Bulman DT; 60 Earl Cochran DE; 96 Thomas Johnson DT; 94 N. D. Kalu DE; 78 Cedric Killings DT; 95 Anthony Maddox DT; 98 Antwan Peek DE; 90 Mario Williams DE	Linebackers (LB): 50 Charlie Anderson OLB; 54 Troy Evans OLB; 56 Morlon Greenwood OLB; 53 Shantee Orr OLB; 51 DaShon Polk MLB; 59 DeMeco Ryans MLB; 52 Kailee Wong MLB; Defensive backs (DB): 24 C. C. Brown FS; 26 Glenn Earl SS; 38 Demarcus Faggins CB; 34 Von Hutchins CB; 20 Dexter McCleon CB; 23 Dunta Robinson CB; 30 Jason Simmons S; 42 Michael Stone S; 40 John Walker CB; 25 Dexter Wynn CB; Special teams (ST): 3 Kris Brown K; 48 Bryan Pittman LS; 7 Chad Stanley P	Practice squad: 65 Mike Brisiel G; -- Jamall Broussard WR; -- Curry Burns S; -- Jason Davis DE; 61 Cody Douglas G; 71 Atlas Herrion G; 63 Chris White C; 86 Harry Williams WR; Reserve: 22 Roc Alexander CB (IR); 43 Jameel Cook FB (IR); 75 Lional Dalton DT (IR); 58 Mike Flanagan C (IR); 99 Travis Johnson DT (IR); 97 Alfred Malone DE/DT (IR); 28 Chris McKenzie CB (IR); 13 Jerome Mathis WR/KR (IR); 91 Seth Payne DT (IR); -- Wali Rainer LB (IR); 18 Sage Rosenfels QB (IR); 21 Lewis Sanders CB (IR); 77 Charles Spencer G (IR); 82 Ben Steele TE (IR); 92 Anthony Weaver DE (IR); 72 Zach Wiegert T (IR); 37 Domanick Williams RB (IR); Rookies in italics 53 active, 17 reserve, 8 practice squad

== Uniform combinations ==
In 2006, the Texans wore five different uniform combinations. They wore their blue jerseys and blue pants for the first time during a week 16 win over the Indianapolis Colts, along with wearing their white jerseys and white pants together for the first time in franchise history in the season opener against the Philadelphia Eagles.

== Preseason ==
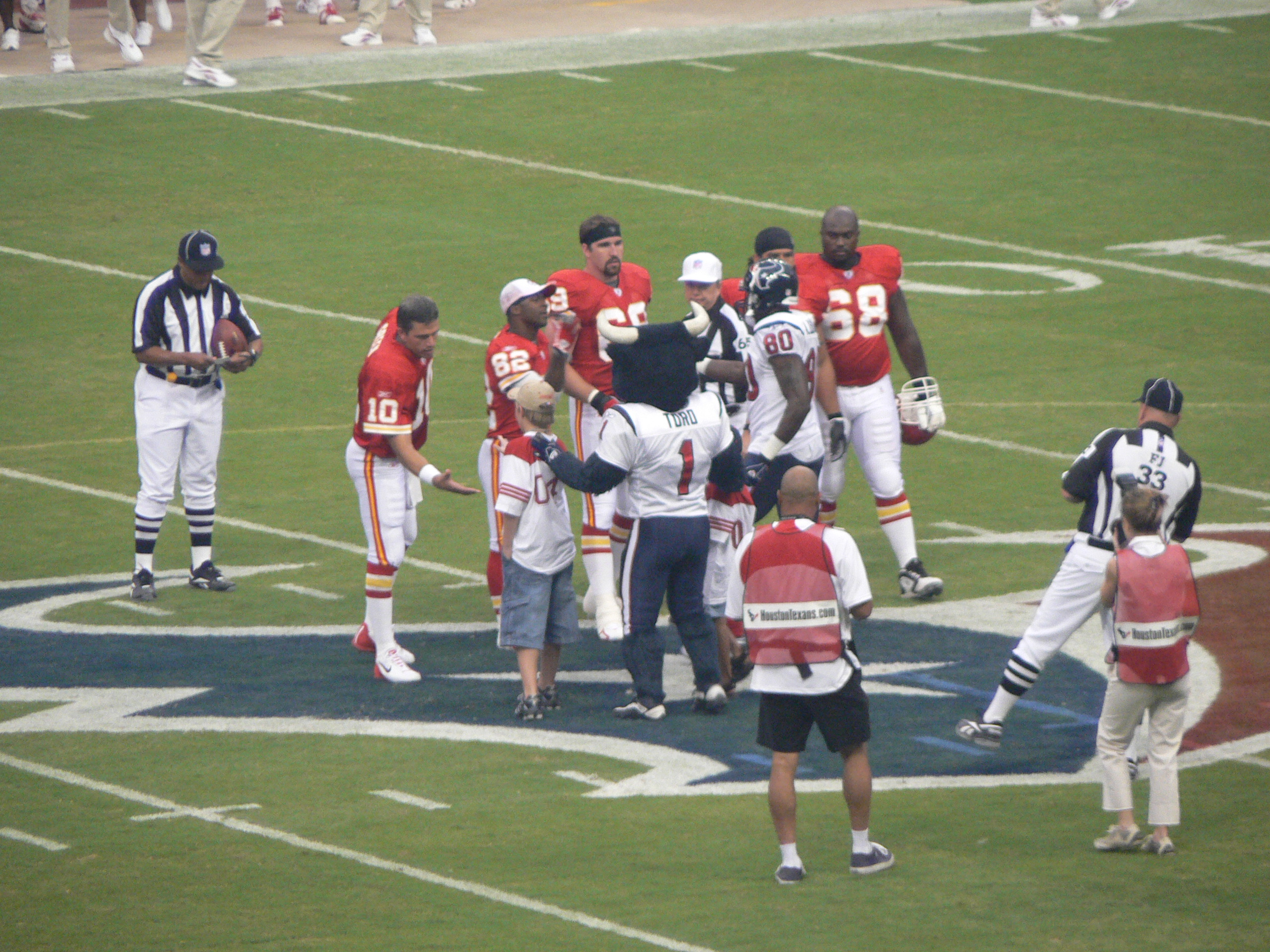
Coin toss against Kansas City, August 12, 2006

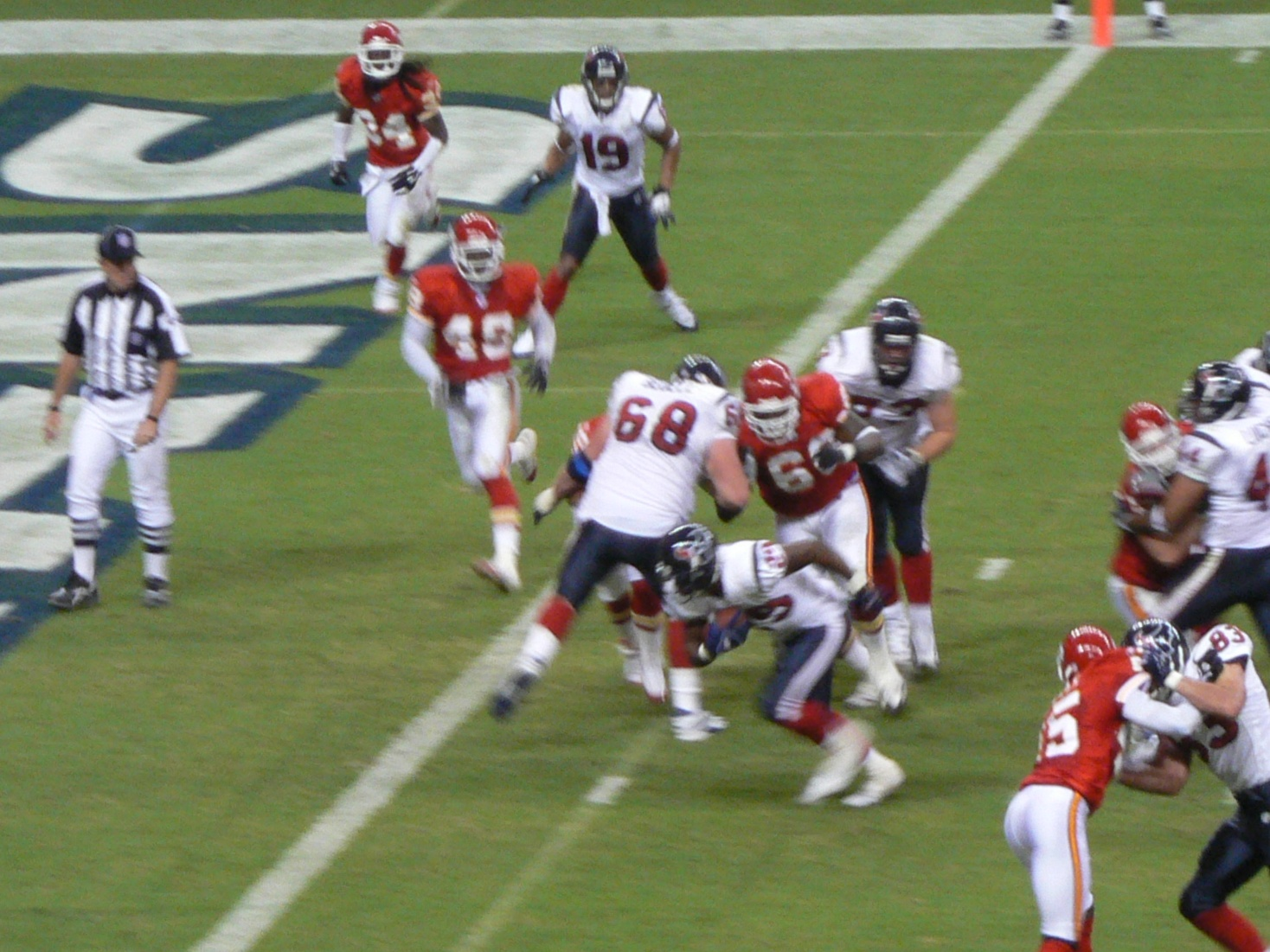
Damien Rhodes about to score, August 12, 2006

=== Schedule ===
Week	Date	Opponent	Result	Record	Venue	Recap
1	August 12	Kansas City Chiefs	W 24–10	1–0	Reliant Stadium	Recap
2	August 19	at St. Louis Rams	W 43–24	2–0	Edward Jones Dome	Recap
3	August 27	at Denver Broncos	L 14–17	2–1	Invesco Field at Mile High	Recap
4	August 31	Tampa Bay Buccaneers	W 16–13	3–1	Reliant Stadium	Recap

== Regular season ==
=== Schedule ===
Week	Date	Opponent	Result	Record	Venue	Recap
1	September 10	Philadelphia Eagles	**L** 10–24	0–1	Reliant Stadium	Recap
2	September 17	at **Indianapolis Colts**	**L** 24–43	0–2	RCA Dome	Recap
3	September 24	Washington Redskins	**L** 15–31	0–3	Reliant Stadium	Recap
4	October 1	Miami Dolphins	**W** 17–15	1–3	Reliant Stadium	Recap
5	Bye					
6	October 15	at Dallas Cowboys	**L** 6–34	1–4	Texas Stadium	Recap
7	October 22	**Jacksonville Jaguars**	**W** 27–7	2–4	Reliant Stadium	Recap
8	October 29	at **Tennessee Titans**	**L** 22–28	2–5	LP Field	Recap
9	November 5	at New York Giants	**L** 10–14	2–6	Giants Stadium	Recap
10	November 12	at **Jacksonville Jaguars**	**W** 13–10	3–6	Alltel Stadium	Recap
11	November 19	Buffalo Bills	**L** 21–24	3–7	Reliant Stadium	Recap
12	November 26	at New York Jets	**L** 11–26	3–8	Giants Stadium	Recap
13	December 3	at Oakland Raiders	**W** 23–14	4–8	McAfee Coliseum	Recap
14	December 10	**Tennessee Titans**	**L** 20–26 (OT)	4–9	Reliant Stadium	Recap
15	December 17	at New England Patriots	**L** 7–40	4–10	Gillette Stadium	Recap
16	December 24	**Indianapolis Colts**	**W** 27–24	5–10	Reliant Stadium	Recap
17	December 31	Cleveland Browns	**W** 14–6	6–10	Reliant Stadium	Recap

Note: Intra-division opponents are in bold text.

=== Standings ===
AFC South
	W	L	T	PCT	DIV	CONF	PF	PA	STK
^{(3)} Indianapolis Colts	12	4	0	.750	3–3	9–3	427	360	W1
Tennessee Titans	8	8	0	.500	4–2	5–7	324	400	L1
Jacksonville Jaguars	8	8	0	.500	2–4	5–7	371	274	L3
Houston Texans	6	10	0	.375	3–3	6–6	267	366	W2

== Game summaries ==
=== Week 1: vs. Philadelphia Eagles ===
Week1: Philadelphia Eagles at Houston Texans – Game summary

Quarter	1	2	3	4	Total
Eagles	0	14	7	3	24
Texans	7	3	0	0	10

at Reliant Stadium, Houston, Texas

- Date: September 10
- Game time: 1:00 p.m.
- Game weather: None (retractable roof closed)
- Game attendance: 70,180
- Referee: Pete Morelli
- Recap

Game information

First quarter

- HOU – Eric Moulds 25-yard pass from David Carr (Kris Brown kick), 8:44. Texans 7–0. Drive: 10 plays, 77 yards, 6:16.

Second quarter

- PHI – Donte' Stallworth 42-yard pass from Donovan McNabb (David Akers kick), 11:08. Tied 7–7. Drive: 8 plays, 84 yards, 3:36.
- HOU – Kris Brown 34-yard field goal, 1:03. Texans 10–7. Drive: 7 plays, 59 yards, 2:39.
- PHI – Reggie Brown 5-yard pass from Donovan McNabb (David Akers kick), 0:11. Eagles 14–10. Drive: 5 plays, 80 yards, 0:52.

Third quarter

- PHI – Brian Westbrook 31-yard pass from Donovan McNabb (David Akers kick), 11:28. Eagles 21–10. Drive: 7 plays, 75 yards, 3:32.

Fourth quarter

- PHI – David Akers 42-yard field goal, 12:48. Eagles 24–10. Drive: 13 plays, 49 yards, 5:54.

Top passers

- PHI – Donovan McNabb – 24/35, 314 yards, 3 TD, INT
- HOU – David Carr – 18/27, 208 yards, TD

Top rushers

- PHI – Brian Westbrook – 17 rushes, 71 yards
- HOU – Wali Lundy – 11 rushes, 32 yards

Top receivers

- PHI – Donte' Stallworth – 6 receptions, 141 yards, TD
- HOU – Andre Johnson – 6 receptions, 101 yards

The Texans opened the 2006 season at home against the Philadelphia Eagles on September 10. The Texans looked sharp early with QB David Carr throwing a 25-yard TD pass to former Bills WR Eric Moulds in the 1st Quarter. The Eagles would tie the game with QB Donovan McNabb throwing a 42-yard TD strike to WR Donte' Stallworth. The Texans would retake the lead, however, after a 34-yard FG from K Kris Brown. Philadelphia took the lead late in the half with McNabb throwing a 5-yard TD pass to WR Reggie Brown and held on to it for the rest of the game. In the third quarter, McNabb hooked up with RB Brian Westbrook with a 31-yard pass and then, opposing kicker David Akers ended the game in the fourth quarter with a 42-yard field goal. David Carr finished 18-of-27 for 208 yards and a touchdown and was sacked five times.

=== Week 2: at Indianapolis Colts ===
Week 2: Houston Texans at Indianapolis Colts – Game summary

Quarter	1	2	3	4	Total
Texans	0	3	0	21	24
Colts	14	6	10	13	43

at RCA Dome, Indianapolis, Indiana

- Date: September 17
- Game time: 1:00 p.m.
- Game weather: None (indoor stadium)
- Game attendance: 56,614
- Referee: Jeff Triplette
- Recap

Game information

First quarter

- IND – Brandon Stokley 10-yard pass from Peyton Manning (Adam Vinatieri kick), 12:48. Colts 7–0. Drive: 3 plays, 16 yards, 1:27.
- IND – Joseph Addai 21-yard pass from Peyton Manning (Adam Vinatieri kick), 8:17. Colts 14–0. Drive: 6 plays, 63 yards, 2:31.

Second quarter

- IND – Adam Vinatieri 39-yard field goal, 6:02. Colts 17–0. Drive: 8 plays, 44 yards, 3:16.
- HOU – Kris Brown 43-yard field goal, 1:54. Colts 17–3. Drive: 10 plays, 55 yards, 4:08.
- IND – Adam Vinatieri 43-yard field goal, 0:00. Colts 20–3. Drive: 9 plays, 44 yards, 1:54.

Third quarter

- IND – Bryan Fletcher 15-yard pass from Peyton Manning (Adam Vinatieri kick), 8:07. Colts 27–3. Drive: 13 plays, 82 yards, 6:53.
- IND – Adam Vinatieri 38-yard field goal, 3:17. Colts 30–3. Drive: 8 plays, 35 yards, 3:07.

Fourth quarter

- HOU – Owen Daniels 33-yard pass from David Carr (Kris Brown kick), 11:36. Colts 30–10. Drive: 7 plays, 80 yards, 2:35.
- IND – Ran Carthon 2-yard run (Adam Vinatieri kick), 7:56. Colts 37–10. Drive: 6 plays, 76 yards, 3:40.
- HOU – Mark Bruener 1-yard pass from David Carr (Kris Brown kick), 5:12. Colts 37–17. Drive: 6 plays, 64 yards, 2:44.
- IND – Ran Carthon 2-yard run (kick failed), 2:28. Colts 43–17. Drive: 9 plays, 65 yards, 2:44.
- HOU – Andre Johnson 10-yard pass from David Carr (Kris Brown kick), 0:45. Colts 43–24. Drive: 6 plays, 61 yards, 1:43.

Top passers

- HOU – David Carr – 22/26, 219 yards, 3 TD
- IND – Peyton Manning – 26/38, 400 yards, 4 TD

Top rushers

- HOU – Ron Dayne – 11 rushes, 37 yards
- IND – Joseph Addai – 16 rushes, 82 yards

Top receivers

- HOU – Eric Moulds – 4 receptions, 59 yards
- IND – Reggie Wayne – 6 receptions, 135 yards

The Texans traveled to the RCA Dome for an AFC South battle with the Indianapolis Colts. From the get-go, Houston trailed as opposing QB Peyton Manning threw a 10-yard TD pass to WR Brandon Stokley and a 21-yard pass to RB Joseph Addai in the first quarter. In the second quarter, opposing Kicker Adam Vinatieri kicked a 39-yard field goal to further distance themselves from Houston. The Texans would get a 43-yard field goal by Kicker Kris Brown, but Vinatieri also made a 43-yarder as time ran out in the half. In the third quarter, the Colts continued to put the game out of reach with Peyton throwing a 15-yard TD pass to TE Bryan Fletcher and Vinatieri kicking a 38-yard field goal. In the fourth quarter, Texans QB David Carr completed a 33-yard TD pass to TE Owen Daniels, but Indianapolis responded with RB Dominic Rhodes getting a 2-yard TD run. Houston would get another TD on a 1-yard pass to TE Mark Bruener, but the Colts put the game away with RB Ran Carthon getting a 3-yard TD run. After WR Andre Johnson provided Houston with a 10-yard TD pass, the Texans ending up losing their ninth straight contest against Indianapolis.

=== Week 3: vs. Washington Redskins ===
Week 3: Washington Redskins at Houston Texans – Game summary

Quarter	1	2	3	4	Total
Redskins	7	14	7	3	31
Texans	7	0	0	8	15

at Reliant Stadium, Houston, Texans

- Date: September 24
- Game time: 1:00 p.m.
- Game weather: None (retractable roof closed)
- Game attendance: 70,069
- Referee: Gene Steratore
- Recap

Game information

First quarter

- HOU – Mark Bruener 2-yard pass from David Carr (Kris Brown kick), 11:34. Texans 7–0. Drive: 4 plays, 66 yards, 1:20.
- WAS – Ladell Betts 9-yard run (John Hall kick), 8:48. Tied 7–7. Drive: 5 plays, 91 yards, 2:46.

Second quarter

- WAS – Antwaan Randle El 23-yard pass from Mark Brunell (John Hall kick), 14:52. Redskins 14–7. Drive: 11 plays, 79 yards, 5:53.
- WAS – Clinton Portis 30-yard run (John Hall kick), 0:01. Redskins 21–7. Drive: 10 plays, 82 yards, 4:49.

Third quarter

- WAS – Clinton Portis 1-yard run (John Hall kick), 5:35. Redskins 28–7. Drive: 14 plays, 70 yards, 8:28.

Fourth quarter

- WAS – John Hall 46-yard field goal, 14:50. Redskins 31–7. Drive: 6 plays, 33 yards, 1:59.
- HOU – Owen Daniels 2-yard pass from David Carr (Ron Dayne run), 12:12. Redskins 31–15. Drive: 7 plays, 71 yards, 2:29.

Top passers

- WAS – Mark Brunell – 24/27, 261 yards, TD
- HOU – David Carr – 19/29, 208 yards, 2 TD, INT

Top rushers

- WAS – Ladell Betts – 16 rushes, 121 yards, TD
- HOU – Ron Dayne – 14 rushes, 58 yards

Top receivers

- WAS – Clinton Portis – 2 receptions, 78 yards
- HOU – Andre Johnson – 11 receptions, 152 yards

The Texans came home in Week 3 to take on the Washington Redskins. In the first quarter, Houston got off to a good start, as TE Mark Bruener caught a 2-yard TD pass. However, the Redskins would tie the game up on a 9-yard run by RB Ladell Betts. From there, things went downhill in the second quarter, as WR Antwaan Randle El caught a 23-yard TD pass and RB Clinton Portis ran 30 yards for a touchdown. In the third quarter, Washington continued to pound Houston, with Portis getting a 1-yard TD run. In the fourth quarter, the Redskins would get one more scoring strike as kicker John Hall kicked a 46-yard field goal. The Texans would get another touchdown, as QB David Carr threw a 2-yard pass to TE Owen Daniels and RB Ron Dayne would run it in for the 2-point conversion. Unfortunately, Houston would fall to 0–3, losing 31–15.

=== Week 4: vs. Miami Dolphins ===
Week 4: Miami Dolphins at Houston Texans – Game summary

Quarter	1	2	3	4	Total
Dolphins	0	3	3	9	15
Texans	0	3	0	14	17

at Reliant Stadium, Houston, Texas

- Date: October 1
- Game time: 1:00 p.m.
- Game weather: None (retractable roof closed)
- Game attendance: 70,071
- Referee: Bill Leavy
- Recap

Game information

First quarter

- No scoring plays

Second quarter

- MIA – Olindo Mare 52-yard field goal, 11:58. Dolphins 3–0. Drive: 6 plays, 11 yards, 3:15.
- HOU – Kris Brown 32-yard field goal, 5:10. Tied 3–3. Drive: 13 plays, 53 yards, 6:48.

Third quarter

- MIA – Olindo Mare 29-yard field goal, 7:55. Dolphins 6–3. Drive: 6 plays, 20 yards, 3:33.

Fourth quarter

- HOU – David Carr 1-yard run (Kris Brown kick), 14:55. Texans 10–6. Drive: 10 plays, 63 yards, 5:01.
- HOU – Andre Johnson 3-yard pass from David Carr (Kris Brown kick), 9:49. Texans 17–6. Drive: 6 plays, 41 yards, 3:31.
- MIA – Olindo Mare 22-yard field goal, 5:41. Texans 17–9. Drive: 11 plays, 76 yards, 4:08.
- MIA – Chris Chambers 16-yard pass from Daunte Culpepper (pass failed), 1:39. Texans 17–15. Drive: 9 plays, 80 yards, 2:01.

Top passers

- MIA – Daunte Culpepper – 23/39, 249 yards, TD
- HOU – David Carr – 22/29, 230 yards, TD, INT

Top rushers

- MIA – Ronnie Brown – 12 rushes, 49 yards
- HOU – Ron Dayne – 22 rushes, 58 yards

Top receivers

- MIA – Ronnie Brown – 8 receptions, 62 yards
- HOU – Andre Johnson – 9 receptions, 101 yards, TD

Staying at home, the Texans (still searching for their first win of the year) played a Week 4 intraconference match-up against the Miami Dolphins. After a scoreless first quarter, Houston trailed early, as Miami kicker Olindo Mare got a 52-yard field goal. Fortunately, the Texans would get a field goal of their own, with kicker Kris Brown getting a 32-yard field goal before halftime. In the third quarter, Houston fell behind, as Mare kicked a 29-yard field goal for Miami. In the fourth quarter, the Texans rallied against the Dolphins, as QB David Carr took the ball into the endzone from one yard out, then completed a 3-yard TD pass to WR Andre Johnson later in the quarter. Mario Williams recorded his first career sack and added a half sack one play later. Afterwards, Houston would have to hold off a late rally by Miami. Mare kicked a 22-yard field goal, and later got a touchdown, as QB Daunte Culpepper threw a 16-yard strike to WR Chris Chambers. Fortunately, the Texans prevented a two-point conversion when Mario Williams tipped the pass and held on to pick up their first win of the year.

=== Week 6: at Dallas Cowboys ===
Week 6: Houston Texans at Dallas Cowboys – Game summary

Quarter	1	2	3	4	Total
Texans	3	3	0	0	6
Cowboys	0	3	14	17	34

at Texas Stadium, Irving, Texas

- Date: October 15
- Game time: 1:00 p.m.
- Game weather: Light rain, 66 °F (19 °C)
- Game attendance: 63,186
- Referee: Larry Nemmers
- TV announcers (CBS): Dick Enberg and Randy Cross
- Recap

Game information

First quarter

- HOU – Kris Brown 19-yard field goal, 8:55. Texans 3–0. Drive: 13 plays, 54 yards, 6:05.

Second quarter

- DAL – Mike Vanderjagt 22-yard field goal, 5:58. Tied 3–3. Drive: 16 plays, 72 yards, 7:33.
- HOU – Kris Brown 48-yard field goal, 0:00. Texans 6–3. Drive: 5 plays, 9 yards, 0:47.

Third quarter

- DAL – Terrell Owens 3-yard pass from Drew Bledsoe (Mike Vanderjagt kick), 10:13. Cowboys 10–6. Drive: 9 plays, 66 yards, 4:47.
- DAL – Terrell Owens 21-yard pass from Drew Bledsoe (Mike Vanderjagt kick), 3:41. Cowboys 17–6. Drive: 3 plays, 23 yards, 0:07.

Fourth quarter

- DAL – Marion Barber III 1-yard run (Mike Vanderjagt kick), 14:57. Cowboys 24–6. Drive: 7 plays, 40 yards, 2:48.
- DAL – Mike Vanderjagt 21-yard field goal, 11:28. Cowboys 27–6. Drive: 7 plays, 23 yards, 3:24.
- DAL – Terrell Owens 2-yard pass from Tony Romo (Mike Vanderjagt kick), 2:24. Cowboys 34–6. Drive: 12 plays, 76 yards, 7:47.

Top passers

- HOU – David Carr – 15/27, 128 yards, 2 INT
- DAL – Drew Bledsoe – 17/28, 168 yards, 2 TD

Top rushers

- HOU – David Carr – 3 rushes, 15 yards
- DAL – Julius Jones – 22 rushes, 106 yards

Top receivers

- HOU – Andre Johnson – 9 receptions, 75 yards
- DAL – Patrick Crayton – 5 receptions, 61 yards

Coming off their Week 5 bye, the Texans traveled to Texas Stadium for a rematch with their first-ever regular season opponent, the Dallas Cowboys, in a Lone Star State showdown. Houston struck first, as Kris Brown nailed a 19-yard field goal for the only first quarter score for either team. In the second quarter, Dallas managed to tie the game, as kicker Mike Vanderjagt hit a 22-yard field goal, but the Texans would retake the lead, as Brown booted a 48-yard field goal just as time ran out in the first half. Unfortunately, Dallas took control of the game in the second half. In the third quarter, QB Drew Bledsoe connected with WR Terrell Owens for two scores (3-yarder and a 21-yarder). In the fourth quarter, RB Marion Barber had a 1-yard TD run, Vanderjagt kicked a 21-yard field goal, and back-up QB Tony Romo hooked up with Owens on a 2-yard TD pass, Owens' third and final TD on the day. Dallas cruised in the second half, outscoring the Texans 31–0, and with the 34–6 loss, the Texans fell to 1–4.

=== Week 7: vs. Jacksonville Jaguars ===
Week 7: Jacksonville Jaguars at Houston Texans – Game summary

Quarter	1	2	3	4	Total
Jaguars	0	0	7	0	7
Texans	0	10	0	17	27

at Reliant Stadium, Houston, Texas

- Date: October 22
- Game time: 1:00 p.m.
- Game attendance: 70,035
- Referee: Jerome Boger
- Recap

Game information

First quarter

- No scoring plays

Second quarter

- HOU – Andre Johnson 35-yard pass from David Carr (Kris Brown kick), 12:16. Texans 7–0. Drive: 12 plays, 81 yards, 5:27.
- HOU – Kris Brown 43-yard field goal, 1:10. Texans 10–0. Drive: 11 plays, 51 yards, 4:58.

Third quarter

- JAX – Maurice Jones-Drew 1-yard run (Josh Scobee kick), 9;20. Texans 10–7. Drive: 10 plays, 70 yards, 5:40.

Fourth quarter

- HOU – Wali Lundy 2-yard run (Kris Brown kick), 11:32. Texans 17–7. Drive: 8 plays, 78 yards, 3:35.
- HOU – Owen Daniels 14-yard pass from David Carr (Kris Brown kick), 9:57. Texans 24–7. Drive: 3 plays, 27 yards, 1:35.
- HOU – Kris Brown 21-yard field goal, 3:12. Texans 27–7. Drive: 6 plays, 29 yards, 1:52.

Top passers

- JAX – Byron Leftwich – 14/28, 125 yards
- HOU – David Carr – 25/34, 224 yards, 2 TD

Top rushers

- JAX – Fred Taylor – 16 rushes, 84 yards
- HOU – Wali Lundy – 19 rushes, 93 yards, TD

Top receivers

- JAX – Maurice Jones-Drew – 7 receptions, 58 yards
- HOU – Andre Johnson – 8 receptions, 106 yards, TD

Following a disappointing 34–6 road loss to their cross-state rival, the Dallas Cowboys, the Texans were looking to rebound at home against division rival Jacksonville, and they did. Houston did not trail at any point in their 27–7 trouncing of the Jaguars, in which they forced two turnovers, and dominated in total offense, tallying 349 yards from scrimmage to Jacksonville's 220. With the impressive upset, the Texans moved to 2–4, just one game behind the Jags for second place in the AFC South.

=== Week 8: at Tennessee Titans ===
Week 8: Houston Texans at Tennessee Titans – Game summary

Quarter	1	2	3	4	Total
Texans	0	3	7	12	22
Titans	0	14	7	7	28

at LP Field, Nashville, Tennessee

- Date: October 29
- Game time: 1:00 p.m.
- Game weather: Clear, 72 °F (22 °C)
- Game attendance: 69,143
- Referee: Gerry Austin
- Recap

Hoping to build on their surprising victory over the Jaguars, the Texans flew to LP Field for an AFC South showdown with the Tennessee Titans. After a scoreless first quarter, the Texans trailed early, as Tennessee QB Vince Young ran 20 yards for a touchdown. Houston would respond with kicker Kris Brown nailing a 27-yard field goal. However, things started getting ugly as Titans DE Tony Brown returned a fumble 40 yards for a TD. In the third quarter, QB David Carr lasted for only one drive, which resulted in a fumble recovery for Tennessee. He would be replaced with back-up QB Sage Rosenfels. However, a Rosefels interception resulted in Young completing a 20-yard TD pass to WR Bobby Wade. The Texans would respond with Rosenfels completing a 10-yard TD pass to WR Andre Johnson. In the fourth quarter however, CB Pacman Jones returned a punt 53 yards for a touchdown. Houston would try to retaliate, as Rosenfels completed two touchdown passes (a 1-yarder and a 2-yarder to rookie TE Owen Daniels), but in the end, any hope for a comeback resulted in a fumble, dropping the Texans to 2–5.

=== Week 9: at New York Giants ===
Week 9: Houston Texans at New York Giants – Game summary

Quarter	1	2	3	4	Total
Texans	0	3	7	0	10
Giants	7	0	0	7	14

at Giants Stadium, East Rutherford, New Jersey

- Date: November 5
- Game time: 1:00 p.m.
- Game weather: Partly cloudy, 46 °F (8 °C)
- Game attendance: 78,485
- Referee: Bill Vinovich
- Recap

The Texans took a lead into the fourth quarter after David Carr scored a go-ahead touchdown on a 2-yard scramble with 1:14 left in the third quarter, capping an 18-play, 80-yard drive. He finished 21-for-30 for 176 yards and no interceptions. Andre Johnson, the NFL's leading receiver, had nine catches for 83 yards. Houston led 10–7 before Jeremy Shockey caught a short touchdown pass from Eli Manning midway through the fourth quarter. Still, the Texans had a chance at the upset and were driving when rookie linebacker Gerris Wilkinson forced fullback Jameel Cook to fumble at the Giants 35 after a short catch. Cornerback Corey Webster recovered with 5:11 to play, and the Giants ran out the clock for the win. Houston RB Wali Lundy was held to 43 yards on 20 carries for a 2.2 yard per carry average. Meanwhile, New York RB Tiki Barber averaged 6.8 yards per carry, gaining 115 yards on 17 carries. Mario Williams sacked Manning in the second quarter, increasing his season total to 4½, a Texans rookie record. The loss made the team drop to 2–6 for the season and 0–4 against NFC opponents for the first time in franchise history.

=== Week 10: at Jacksonville Jaguars ===
Week 10: Houston Texans at Jacksonville Jaguars – Game summary

Quarter	1	2	3	4	Total
Texans	10	0	3	0	13
Jaguars	0	3	0	7	10

at Alltel Stadium, Jacksonville, Florida

- Date: November 12
- Game time: 1:00 p.m.
- Game weather: Clear, 56 °F (13 °C)
- Game attendance: 65,918
- Referee: Gene Steratore
- Recap

Game information

First quarter

- HOU – Wali Lundy 1-yard run (Kris Brown kick), 11:08. Texans 707. Drive: 9 plays, 70 yards, 3:52.
- HOU – Kris Brown 25-yard field goal, 4:52. Texans 10–0. Drive: 10 plays, 35 yards, 4:18.

Second quarter

- JAX – Josh Scobee 44-yard field goal, 14:48. Texans 10–3. Drive: 10 plays, 54 yards, 5:04.

Third quarter

- HOU – Kris Brown 28-yard field goal, 4:55. Texans 13–3. Drive: 7 plays, 21 yards, 3:01.

Fourth quarter

- JAX – Maurice Jones-Drew 3-yard run (Josh Scobee kick), 4:32. Texans 13–10. Drive: 5 plays, 60 yards, 1:08.

Top passers

- HOU – David Carr – 16/32, 167 yards
- JAX – David Garrard – 15/34, 214 yards, 4 INT

Top rushers

- HOU – Samkon Gado – 17 rushes, 67 yards
- JAX – Fred Taylor – 12 rushes, 63 yards

Top receivers

- HOU – Andre Johnson – 3 receptions, 56 yards
- JAX – Fred Taylor – 5 receptions, 71 yards

David Carr threw for 167 yards and ran for 48 more, and the Texans defeated the Jaguars 13–10 to snap a 12-game road losing streak. The Texans upset their AFC South rivals for the second time in four weeks and won on the road for the first time since December 2004. David Garrard, making his third consecutive start in place of Byron Leftwich, was intercepted four times. Two came after Matt Jones bobbled perfect passes. Ernest Wilford also dropped two balls, including a deep one that could have been a touchdown. Carr directed a 70-yard drive to start the game and had two key runs. Wali Lundy scored from 1 yard, then Houston took advantage of Garrard's first turnover to make it 10–0. DeMeco Ryans pressured Garrard and forced a floater over the middle. Morlon Greenwood picked it off, setting up Kris Brown's 25-yard field goal.

=== Week 11: vs. Buffalo Bills ===
Week 11: Buffalo Bills at Houston Texans – Game summary

Quarter	1	2	3	4	Total
Bills	14	3	0	7	24
Texans	7	7	7	0	21

at Reliant Stadium, Houston, Texas

- Date: November 12
- Game time: 1:00 p.m.
- Game attendance: 70,125
- Referee: Terry McAulay
- Recap

The Bills' WR Lee Evans and QB J. P. Losman were unstoppable in the first quarter, connecting for 205 yards and two 83-yard touchdowns. Evans' first-quarter performance was a Buffalo record for a period and just shy of the NFL record for yards receiving in a quarter of 210 by Baltimore's Qadry Ismail in 1999. The first touchdown came after Nate Clements' interception on the third play of the game. Both were after Evans got in front of Texans cornerback Demarcus Faggins for the easy score. The 83-yard TDs were career highs for both Losman and Evans and marked the first time in franchise history the Bills have had two 80-yard passes in a single game. David Carr opened 1 for 3 with an interception on his first pass before completing his next 22 throws. Carr finished 25 of 30 for 223 yards and no touchdowns. Carr tied the record held by Mark Brunell, who had 22 consecutive completions in Washington's 31–15 win over the Texans at Reliant Stadium on September 24. He tied Brunell's record on a short pass to Wali Lundy for no gain with 6:19 left. The streak was broken when his pass to Andre Johnson with 5:44 remaining fell short. Lundy cut the lead to 14–7 with a 17-yard run in the first quarter. That score was set up by a 17-yard reception by Eric Moulds on third-and-8. Samkon Gado made it 17–14 on a 1-yard run in the second quarter. Moulds also had a key third-down reception on that drive. Dunta Robinson gave the Texans the lead on a 9-yard interception return midway through the third quarter. Losman was throwing out of the end zone when Robinson intercepted the pass intended for Evans to score his first career touchdown and the Texans' first defensive touchdown since 2004. But after the offense failed to put the game away in the fourth quarter the Texans gave the Bills just enough time to beat them. Losman hit a diving Peerless Price in the back of the end zone for the 15-yard touchdown with 13 seconds left, giving Buffalo the 24–21 win.

This would be Houston's last home loss against Buffalo until 2026.

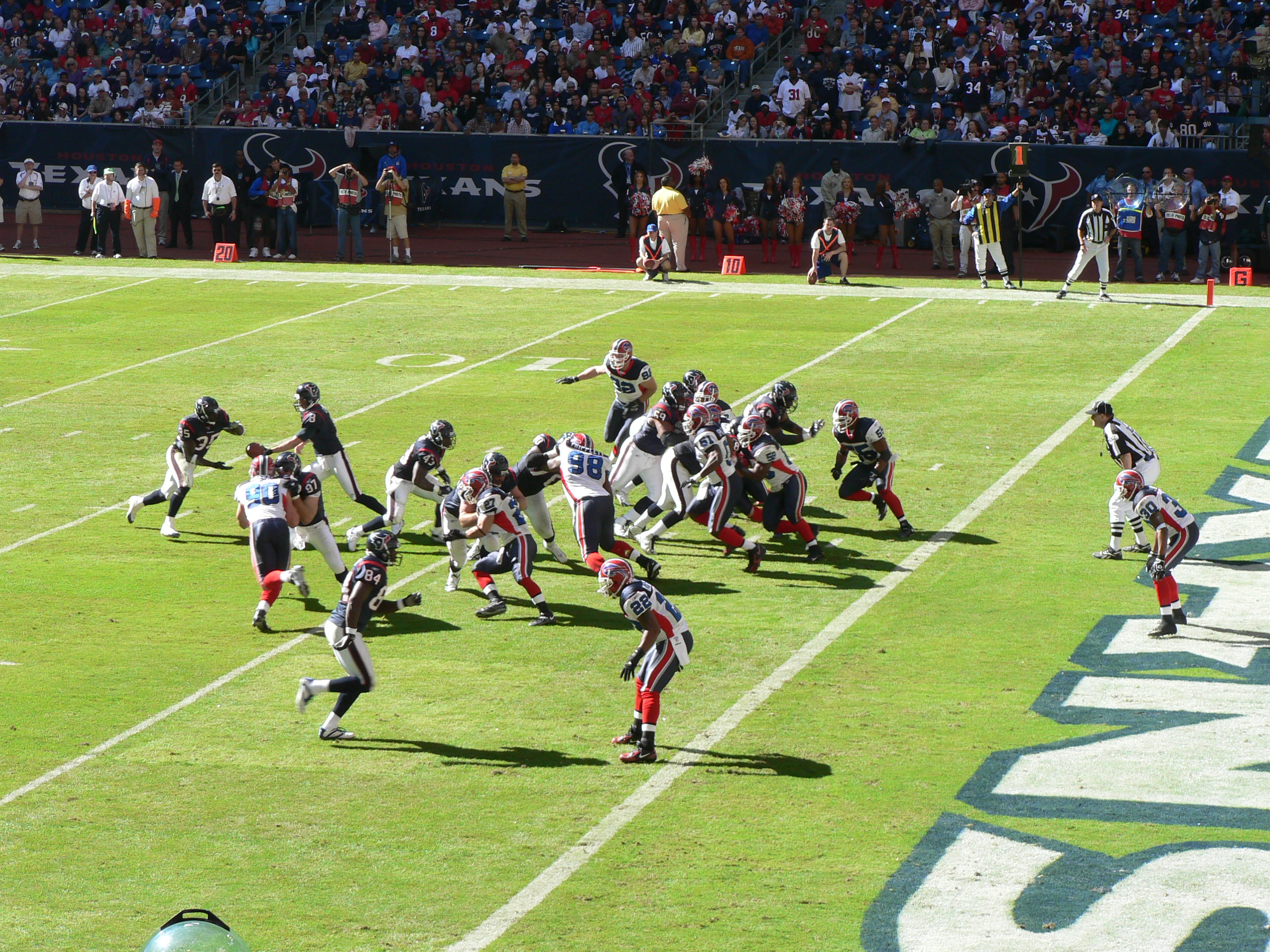
Texans QB David Carr hands off to Samkon Gado

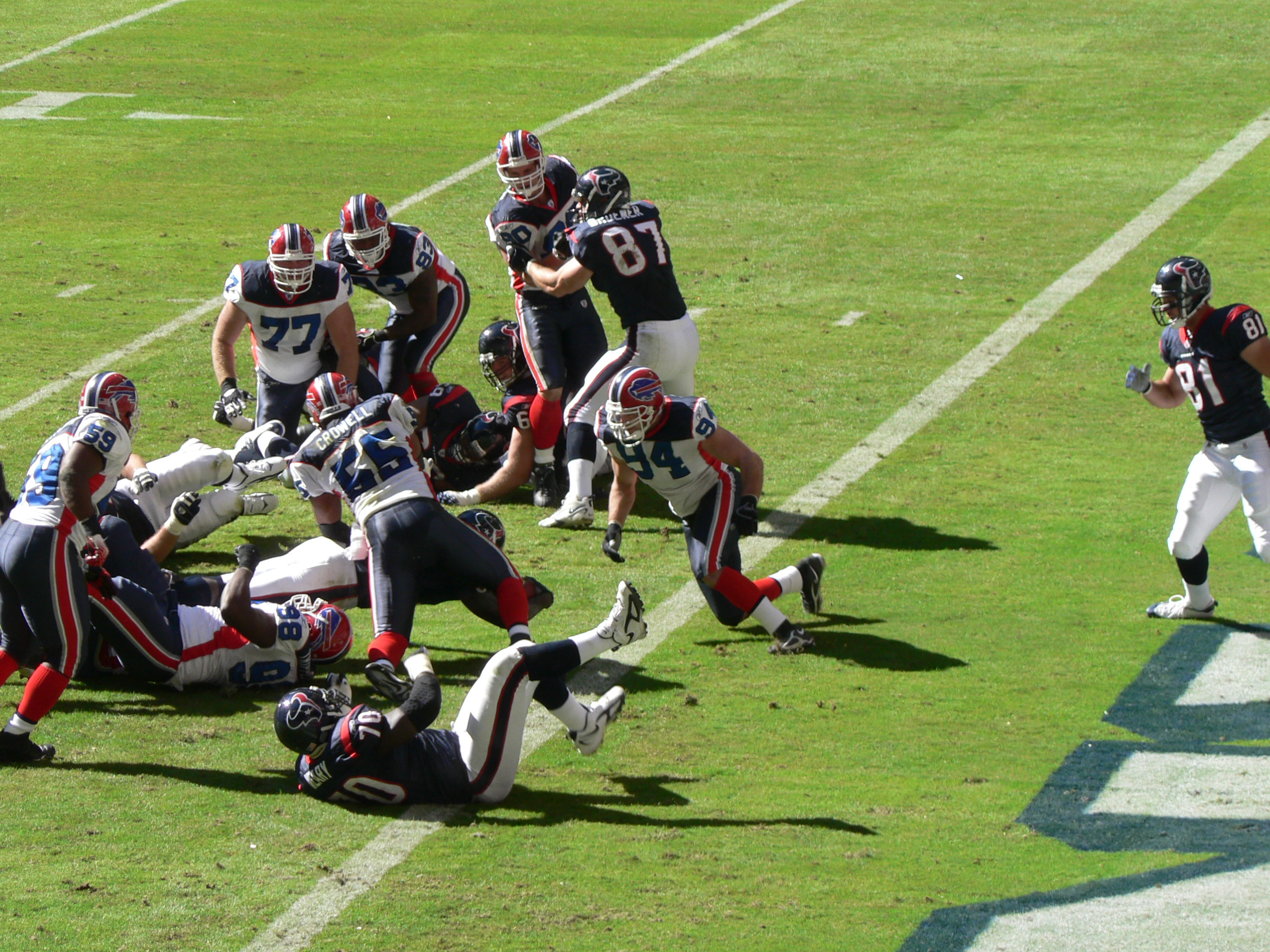
Gado advances to Buffalo's 1-yard line

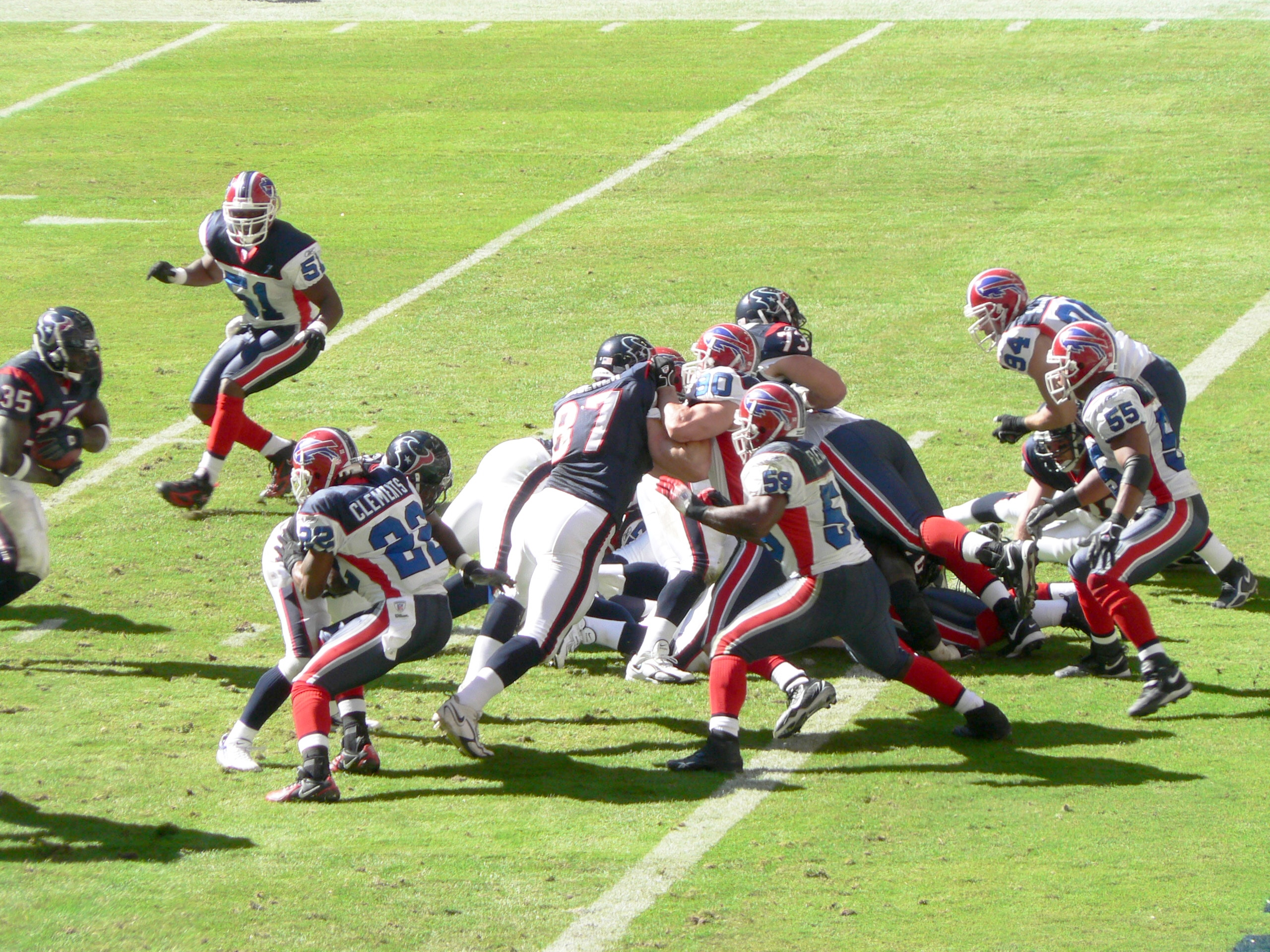
Gado rushes

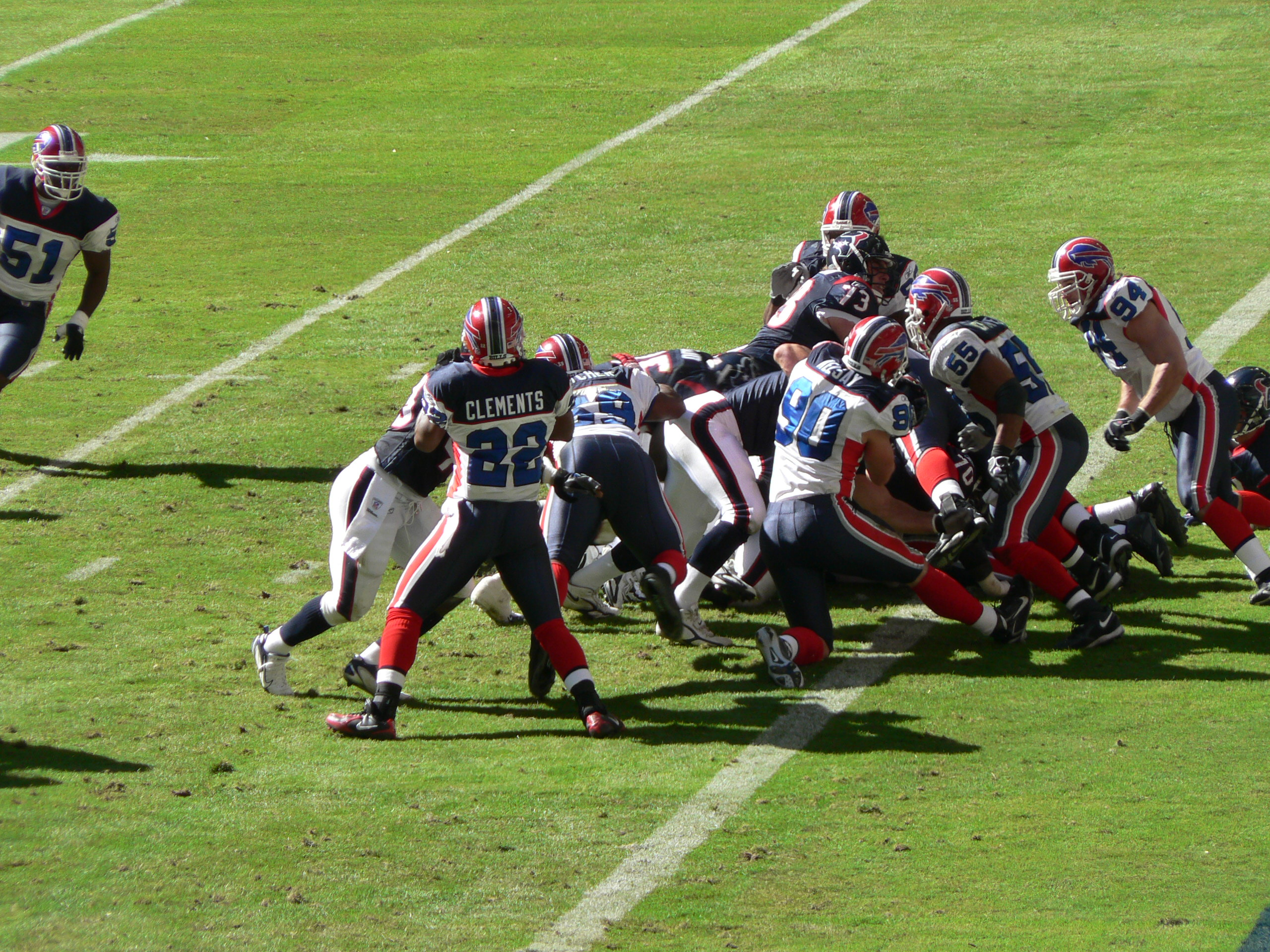
The Texans attempt a rush at the goal line

=== Week 12: at New York Jets ===
Week 12: Houston Texans at New York Jets – Game summary

Quarter	1	2	3	4	Total
Texans	0	3	0	8	11
Jets	3	6	14	3	26

at Giants Stadium, East Rutherford, New Jersey

- Date: November 26
- Game time: 1:00 p.m.
- Game weather: Cloudy, 56 °F (13 °C)
- Game attendance: 76,596
- Referee: Bill Leavy
- Recap

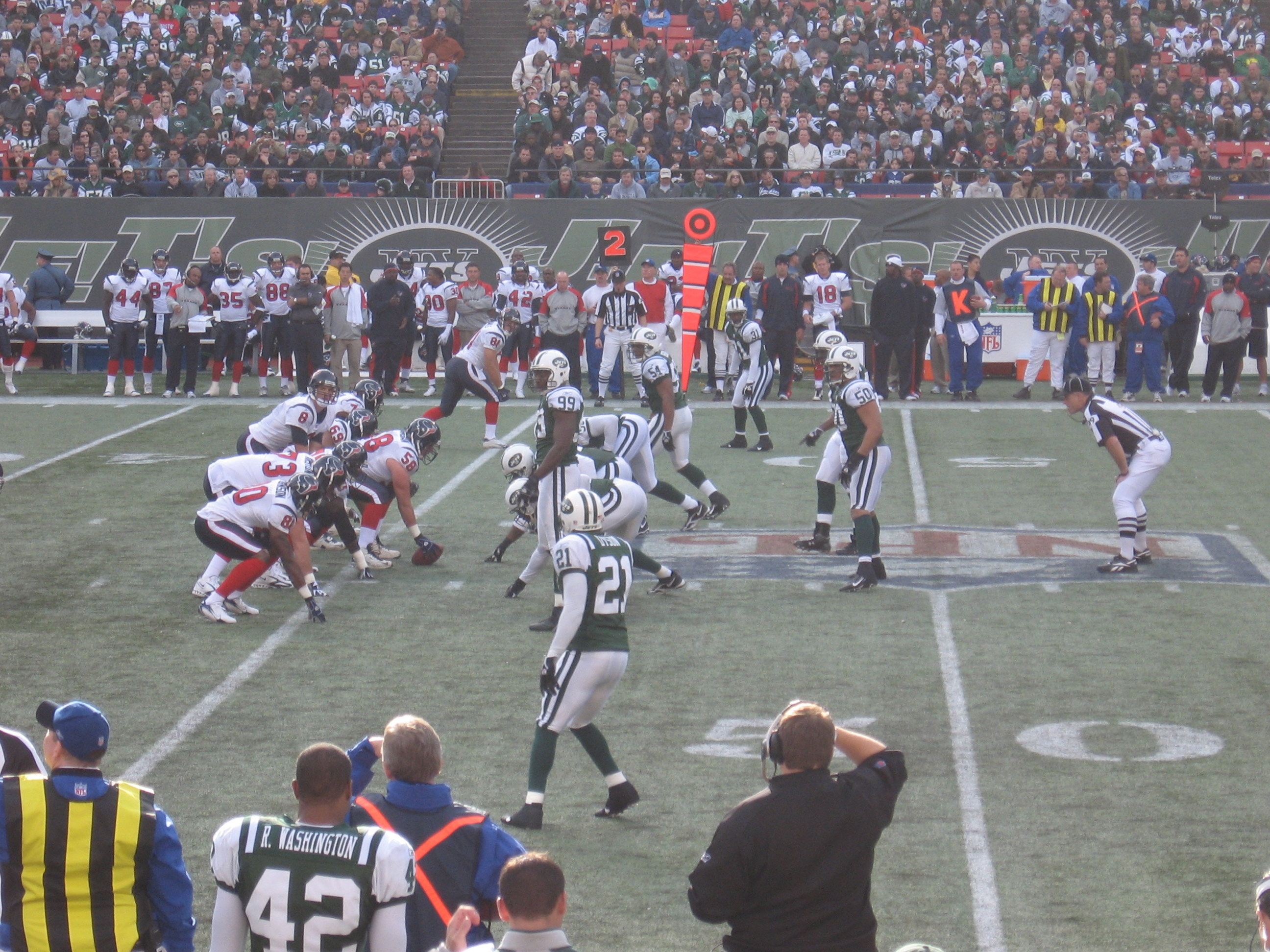
The Jets and Texans, week 12

The Jets held the Texans to just 25 yards rushing and cruised to an easy 15-point victory. Chad Pennington connected with Laveranues Coles for a touchdown and Cedric Houston ran for another in the third quarter to go up 23–0. Andre Johnson caught a 3-yard touchdown pass from David Carr with 3:51 left to cap a 76-yard drive for the Texans, and Wali Lundy's short reception completed the two-point conversion as the Texans finally put points on the board. It was a case of too little, too late however as the Texans once again failed to win two consecutive road games. They have not won back-to-back road games since 2004, when they beat Chicago (Dec. 19) and Jacksonville (Dec. 26). Carr was 39 of 54 for 321 yards, and Johnson and Eric Moulds each had 10 catches, but the lack of any running game doomed the Texans.

=== Week 13: at Oakland Raiders ===
Week 13: Houston Texans at Oakland Raiders – Game summary

Quarter	1	2	3	4	Total
Texans	7	0	7	9	23
Raiders	0	14	0	0	14

at McAfee Coliseum, Oakland, California

- Date: December 3
- Game time: 4:00 p.m.
- Game weather: Clear, 56 °F (13 °C)
- Game attendance: 46,276
- Referee: Jerome Boger
- Recap

The Texans became the first team since the Houston Oilers 25 years ago to win a game with negative yards passing, using Demarcus Faggins' 58-yard fumble return for a touchdown, two long returns on special teams and a pair of fumbles by Randal Williams to beat the Oakland Raiders 23–14. David Carr finished 7-of-14 for 32 yards, failing to complete a pass in the final 32 minutes. He was sacked five times for 37 yards, leaving Houston with negative-5 yards passing. The Texans were the first team since the Houston Oilers on Oct. 4, 1981, against Cincinnati to finish with negative yards passing and win. Late in the half, Carr had a run of three straight offensive plays when he was sacked and fumbled the ball. Carr lost the first two fumbles, including one returned 35 yards for a score by Kirk Morrison after Warren Sapp's in the final minute of the half to make it 14–7. Jerome Mathis, who missed the first 11 games recovering from a fractured foot, provided a spark with an 87-yard return of the second-half kickoff. Wali Lundy ran in from the 3 on the next play to tie the game at 14. Mathis was later used as a decoy when Dexter Wynn faked a reverse on a punt return and went 58 yards before being tackled by punter Shane Lechler at the 21. The Texans settled for a 42-yard field goal by Kris Brown to make it 17–14. A pair of fumbles by Williams led to two more field goals by Brown, putting the game out of reach. Rookie DeMeco Ryans led the defense for Houston with 14 solo tackles, a sack, a forced fumble, a fumble recovery and an interception.

=== Week 14: vs. Tennessee Titans ===
Week 14: Tennessee Titans at Houston Texans – Game summary

Quarter	1	2	3	4	OT	Total
Titans	3	3	7	7	6	26
Texans	0	7	7	6	0	20

at Reliant Stadium, Houston Texans

- Date: December 10
- Game time: 1:00 p.m.
- Game weather: None (retractable roof closed)
- Game attendance: 70,760
- Referee: Tony Corrente
- Recap

Titans rookie and Houston native Vince Young dealt the Texans their most bitter defeat of the season when he converted a third-and-14 into a 39-yard touchdown run in overtime, completing his triumphant homecoming, while also knocking the Texans out of playoff contention. The former University of Texas star, who grew up just six miles from the stadium, ran into the end zone virtually untouched and then jumped into the stands to the open arms of a throng of burnt orange-clad fans. Houston's offense didn't do much until Ron Dayne entered in the second quarter. He handled the ball on eight of Houston's nine plays and scored his first touchdown as a Texan on a 1-yard run to give Houston a 7–6 lead. Dayne helped the Texans extend their lead on a 2-yard touchdown on the first drive after halftime. He finished with 21 carries for 87 yards. The Titans trailed 14–13 before Young engineered a 15-play, 88-yard drive ending with a 2-yard run by Travis Henry to give Tennessee (6–7) its first lead of the second half, 20–17. Young and Drew Bennett earlier connected on a 39-yard pass that got the Titans to the Houston 21. Henry cut to the outside and ran for the 9-yard touchdown three plays later to cut Houston's lead to 14–13. David Carr and the Texans had a chance to regain the lead late in regulation, but stalled and settled for a 46-yard field goal by Kris Brown that tied it at 20 with 2:09 remaining. The Texans got the ball back in the final moments of the fourth quarter, but chose to run out the clock. Carr was 17 of 23 for 140 yards, but was unable to come through when the Texans needed a touchdown.

=== Week 15: at New England Patriots ===
Week 15: Houston Texans at New England Patriots – Game summary

Quarter	1	2	3	4	Total
Texans	0	0	7	0	7
Patriots	17	10	7	6	40

at Gillette Stadium, Foxboro, Massachusetts

- Date: December 17
- Game time: 1:00 p.m.
- Game weather: Partly cloudy, 52 °F (11 °C)
- Game attendance: 68,756
- Referee: Scott Green
- Recap

With the game scoreless early in the first quarter, the Texans faked a punt on fourth and one from their own 42...and failed. The Patriots' Kevin Faulk converted the Texans' mistake into an 11-yard TD run. Faulk also scored on a 43-yard screen pass, and Tom Brady threw another touchdown pass, covering 6 yards to former Texan Jabar Gaffney. The Patriots' defense had four sacks and three interceptions and held the Texans to 76 yards in the first two quarters. The Texans trailed 27–0 at halftime. Ron Dayne scored on a 1-yard run on the Texans' first series of the third quarter, but Ellis Hobbs returned the ensuing kickoff 93 yards for a touchdown to put the game out of reach. David Carr turned in another poor performance completing 16-of-28 for 127 yards and four interceptions.

=== Week 16: vs. Indianapolis Colts ===
Week 16: Indianapolis Colts at Houston Texans – Game summary

Quarter	1	2	3	4	Total
Colts	7	7	3	7	24
Texans	14	7	0	6	27

at Reliant Stadium, Houston, Texas

- Date: December 24
- Game time: 1:00 p.m.
- Game weather: None (retractable roof closed)
- Game attendance: 70,132
- Referee: Ed Hochuli
- Recap

Clad in all-blue uniforms for the first time in franchise history, Ron Dayne rushed for a career-high 153 yards and two touchdowns and Kris Brown kicked the winning 48-yard field goal as time expired to shock the Colts 27–24. The Texans used Dayne and rookie Chris Taylor to eat up the clock and exploit the Colts' suspect run defense, ranked last in the NFL, while taking pressure off David Carr and the struggling passing game. The win broke a nine-game losing streak to the Colts (11–4). It would be the Colts' last defeat before winning Super Bowl XLI. Mario Williams forced a Dominic Rhodes fumble on the Colts' second play. Anthony Weaver recovered the ball on the Indianapolis 47 and Houston would convert it into a touchdown, taking an early 14–0 lead. Houston led through most of the game until Peyton Manning and Marvin Harrison connected for their second touchdown, a 7-yard pass that tied it 24–24 with 2:41 remaining. Carr and the Texans then engineered a six-play, 31-yard drive that ended with Brown's winning kick. Carr was 16-of-23 for 163 yards and a touchdown and was not sacked.

=== Week 17: vs. Cleveland Browns ===
Week 17: Cleveland Browns at Houston Texans – Game summary

Quarter	1	2	3	4	Total
Browns	0	3	0	3	6
Texans	0	0	14	0	14

at Reliant Stadium, Houston, Texas

- Date: December 31
- Game time: 1:00 p.m.
- Game attendance: 70,097
- Referee: Mike Carey
- Recap

Chris Taylor ran for 99 yards with a touchdown as the Houston Texans defeated the Cleveland Browns, 14–6, at Reliant Stadium. Taylor carried the ball 20 times in the contest and Anthony Maddox returned a fumble 47 yards for a score, as the Texans won three of their last five games of the season to finish 6–10. David Carr managed the game well and finished 9-of-15 passing for 86 yards with an interception in the victory. Kicker Phil Dawson accounted for the only Cleveland points with two field goals. Charlie Frye, starting his first game since injuring a wrist in the Browns' win versus the Kansas City Chiefs on December 3, was 25-of-34 passing for 187 yards with an interception. Kellen Winslow had 11 catches for 93 yards for Cleveland (4–12), which lost its last four games. Winslow tied Hall-of-Famer Ozzie Newsome for most catches by a Browns player, with 87 in the loss. Reuben Droughns added 83 yards rushing on 19 carries in defeat.

== Statistics ==
=== Team ===
Category	Total yards	Yards per game	NFL rank (out of 32)
Passing offense	2,778	173.6	27th
Rushing offense	1,687	105.4	21st
Total offense	4,465	279.1	28th
Passing defense	3,444	215.3	22nd
Rushing defense	1,956	122.3	20th
Total defense	5,400	337.5	24th

=== Individual ===
Category	Player	Total
Offense
Passing yards	David Carr	2,767
Passing touchdowns	David Carr	11
Rushing yards	Ron Dayne	612
Rushing touchdowns	Ron Dayne	5
Receiving yards	Andre Johnson	1,147
Receiving touchdowns	Andre Johnson; Owen Daniels	5
Defense
Tackles (Solo)	DeMeco Ryans	125
Sacks	Jason Babin	5
Interceptions	DeMarcus Faggins; Dunta Robinson	2
