= 2009 Houston Texans season =

8th season in franchise history

- Owner: Bob McNair
- General manager: Rick Smith
- Head coach: Gary Kubiak
- Offensive coordinator: Kyle Shanahan
- Defensive coordinator: Frank Bush
- Home stadium: Reliant Stadium

Results
- Record: 9–7
- Division place: 2nd AFC South
- Playoffs: Did not qualify
- All-Pros: 2: WR Andre Johnson (1st team); OLB Brian Cushing (2nd team)
- Pro Bowlers: 5: QB Matt Schaub; WR Andre Johnson; ILB DeMeco Ryans; OLB Mario Williams; OLB Brian Cushing

Uniform
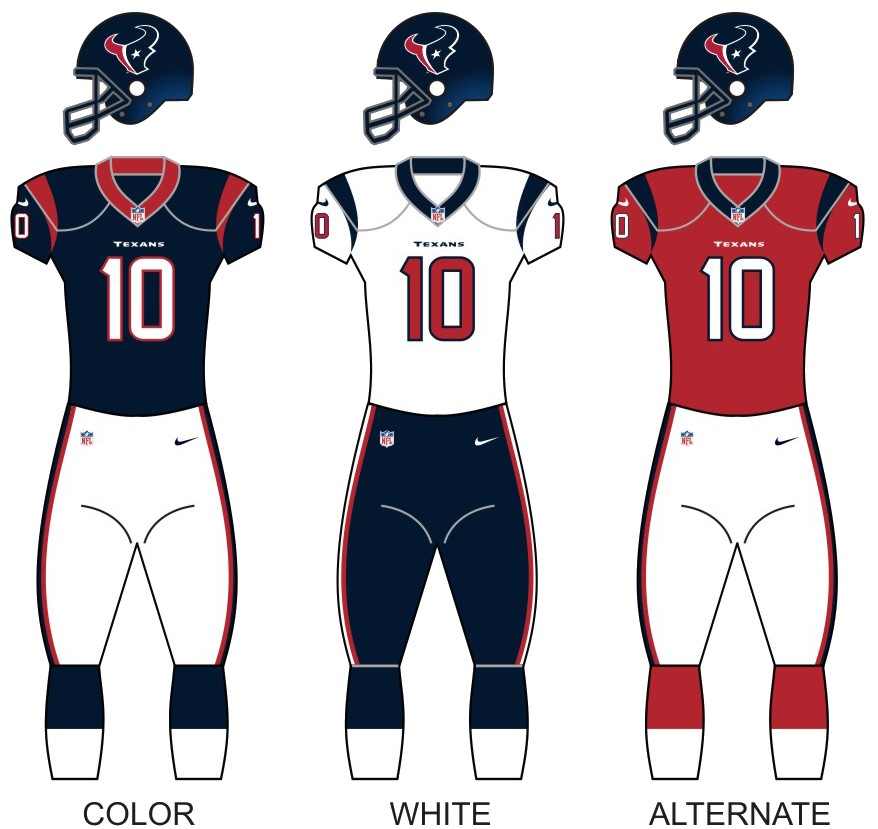

The 2009 Houston Texans season was the franchise's 8th season in the National Football League (NFL) and the 4th under head coach Gary Kubiak. The Texans improved upon their 8–8 record in 2008 and claimed their first winning season in franchise history. However, 4 straight heartbreaking division losses came back to haunt them, as they narrowly missed making the playoffs, being the first team out in a series of tiebreakers, and due to the Cincinnati Bengals and rival Indianapolis Colts resting their starters against the New York Jets after clinching the AFC North and No. 1 AFC seed, respectively.

== Offseason ==
=== Coaching changes ===
Head coach Gary Kubiak entered his fourth year as the Texans' head coach. Frank Bush, who had served as the Texans senior defensive assistant since 2007, was promoted to defensive coordinator on January 13, 2009 after the firing of Richard Smith. Smith was terminated shortly after the conclusion of the 2008 season. David Gibbs, son of NFL coach Alex Gibbs, was hired on January 19, 2009 as the new defensive backs coach after previously serving in the same role for the Kansas City Chiefs since 2006. Pro Football Hall of Famer and former Houston Oilers offensive lineman Bruce Matthews enters his first season as a coach in the NFL, filling one of the offensive assistant coach positions for the Texans.

=== Player additions/subtractions ===
Additions:

- QB Dan Orlovsky
- LB Antonio Smith
- DT Shaun Cody
- LB Buster Davis
- LB Cato June
- SS Bernard Pollard
- QB Rex Grossman

Subtractions:

- QB Sage Rosenfels
- LB Morlon Greenwood
- RB Ahman Green
- DE Anthony Weaver
- SS Will Demps
- OT Ephraim Salaam
- TE Mark Bruener
- DE Earl Cochran
- CB Jimmy Williams
- CB Demarcus Faggins
- SS C.C. Brown
- RB Cecil Sapp

=== NFL draft ===
2009 Houston Texans draft
Round	Pick	Player	Position	College	Notes
1	15	Brian Cushing *	Linebacker	USC	
2	46	Connor Barwin *	Defensive end	Cincinnati	
3	77	Antoine Caldwell	Center	Alabama	
4	112	Glover Quin *	Cornerback	New Mexico	
4	122	Anthony Hill	Tight end	North Carolina State	
5	152	James Casey	Tight end	Rice	
6	188	Brice McCain	Cornerback	Utah	
7	223	Troy Nolan	Safety	Arizona State	
Made roster * Made at least one Pro Bowl during career

The Texans had eight selections for the 2009 NFL Draft. They received an additional fourth-round pick (selection 122 overall) in a trade with the Minnesota Vikings in exchange for quarterback Sage Rosenfels.

The team signed undrafted Tennessee running back Arian Foster after the draft, and signed him to the practice squad, and he made his NFL debut mid-season. Foster would go on to win the NFL rushing title the following year.

== Staff ==
2009 Houston Texans staff
Front office: Founder, chairman and chief executive officer – Bob McNair; Vice chairman – Philip Burguières; Vice chairman – D. Cal McNair; President – Jamey Rootes; General manager – Rick Smith; Director of pro personnel – Brian Gardner; Associate director of pro personnel – Bobby Grier; Director of college scouting – Dale Strahm; Coordinator of college scouting – Mike Maccagnan; Head coaches: Head coach – Gary Kubiak; Assistant head coach/offense – Alex Gibbs; Assistant head coach/defensive line – Bill Kollar; Offensive coaches: Offensive coordinator/quarterbacks – Kyle Shanahan; Running backs – Chick Harris; Wide receivers – Larry Kirksey; Tight ends – Brian Pariani; Offensive line – John Benton; Assistant offensive line – Frank Pollack; Offensive assistant – Matt LaFleur; Offensive assistant/quality control – Bruce Matthews	Defensive coaches: Defensive coordinator – Frank Bush; Linebackers – Johnny Holland; Assistant linebackers – Robert Saleh; Defensive backs – David Gibbs; Senior defensive assistant – Ray Rhodes; Defensive assistant – Perry Carter; Special teams coaches: Special teams – Joe Marciano; Strength and conditioning: Strength and conditioning – Ray Wright; Assistant strength and conditioning – Matt Schiotz

== Roster ==
2009 Houston Texans roster
Quarterbacks (QB): 5 Rex Grossman; 7 Dan Orlovsky; 8 Matt Schaub; Running backs (RB): 22 Chris Brown; 37 Arian Foster; 27 Chris Henry; 44 Vonta Leach FB; 21 Ryan Moats; Wide receivers (WR): 89 David Anderson; 11 André Davis KR; 80 Andre Johnson; 12 Jacoby Jones; 17 Glenn Martinez PR; 83 Kevin Walter; Tight ends (TE): 86 James Casey; 85 Joel Dreessen	Offensive linemen (OL): 76 Duane Brown T; 78 Rashad Butler T; 62 Antoine Caldwell C/G; 55 Chris Myers C; 70 Tutan Reyes G; 74 Ephraim Salaam T; 64 Kasey Studdard G; 63 Chris White G; 73 Eric Winston T; Defensive linemen (DL): 98 Connor Barwin DE; 93 Tim Bulman DE; 95 Shaun Cody DT; 96 Tim Jamison DE; 97 Frank Okam DT; 91 Amobi Okoye DT; 66 DelJuan Robinson DT; 94 Antonio Smith DE; 90 Mario Williams DE; 92 Jeff Zgonina DT	Linebackers (LB): 52 Xavier Adibi OLB; 57 Kevin Bentley MLB; 56 Brian Cushing OLB; 54 Zac Diles OLB; 59 DeMeco Ryans MLB; Defensive backs (DB): 32 Fred Bennett CB; 40 John Busing S; 25 Nick Ferguson FS; 41 Brice McCain CB; 38 Mark Parson CB; 31 Bernard Pollard SS; 29 Glover Quin CB; 35 Jacques Reeves CB; 23 Dunta Robinson CB; 42 Brian Russell FS; Special teams (ST): 3 Kris Brown K; 48 Bryan Pittman LS; 1 Matt Turk P	Practice squad: 50 Darnell Bing LB; 61 Andrew Crummey G; 99 Pannel Egboh DE; 58 Marcus Freeman LB; 75 Brett Helms C; 72 Jesse Nading DE; 88 Dezmond Sherrod TE; 79 Adam Stenavich T; Reserve: 34 Dominique Barber S (IR); 65 Mike Brisiel G (IR); 53 Khary Campbell LB (IR); 81 Owen Daniels TE (IR); 87 Anthony Hill TE (IR); 38 Jeremiah Johnson RB (IR); 28 Antwaun Molden CB (IR); 33 Troy Nolan S (IR); 69 Chester Pitts G (IR); 20 Steve Slaton RB (IR); 51 Chaun Thompson LB (IR); -- Toddrick Verdell LB (IR); 26 Eugene Wilson S (IR); Rookies in italics 53 active, 13 reserve, 8 practice squad

== Schedule ==
=== Preseason ===
Week	Date	Opponent	Result	Record	Venue	Recap
1	August 15	at Kansas City Chiefs	**W** 16–10	1–0	Arrowhead Stadium	Recap
2	August 22	New Orleans Saints	**L** 14–38	1–1	Reliant Stadium	Recap
3	August 31	Minnesota Vikings	**L** 10–17	1–2	Reliant Stadium	Recap
4	September 4	at Tampa Bay Buccaneers	**W** 27–20	2–2	Raymond James Stadium	Recap

=== Regular season ===
Week	Date	Opponent	Result	Record	Venue	Recap
1	September 13	New York Jets	**L** 7–24	0–1	Reliant Stadium	Recap
2	September 20	at **Tennessee Titans**	**W** 34–31	1–1	LP Field	Recap
3	September 27	**Jacksonville Jaguars**	**L** 24–31	1–2	Reliant Stadium	Recap
4	October 4	Oakland Raiders	**W** 29–6	2–2	Reliant Stadium	Recap
5	October 11	at Arizona Cardinals	**L** 21–28	2–3	University of Phoenix Stadium	Recap
6	October 18	at Cincinnati Bengals	**W** 28–17	3–3	Paul Brown Stadium	Recap
7	October 25	San Francisco 49ers	**W** 24–21	4–3	Reliant Stadium	Recap
8	November 1	at Buffalo Bills	**W** 31–10	5–3	Ralph Wilson Stadium	Recap
9	November 8	at **Indianapolis Colts**	**L** 17–20	5–4	Lucas Oil Stadium	Recap
10	Bye					
11	November 23	**Tennessee Titans**	**L** 17–20	5–5	Reliant Stadium	Recap
12	November 29	**Indianapolis Colts**	**L** 27–35	5–6	Reliant Stadium	Recap
13	December 6	at **Jacksonville Jaguars**	**L** 18–23	5–7	Jacksonville Municipal Stadium	Recap
14	December 13	Seattle Seahawks	**W** 34–7	6–7	Reliant Stadium	Recap
15	December 20	at St. Louis Rams	**W** 16–13	7–7	Edward Jones Dome	Recap
16	December 27	at Miami Dolphins	**W** 27–20	8–7	Land Shark Stadium	Recap
17	January 3	New England Patriots	**W** 34–27	9–7	Reliant Stadium	Recap

Note: Intra-division opponents are in bold text.

== Standings ==
AFC South
	W	L	T	PCT	DIV	CONF	PF	PA	STK
^{(1)} Indianapolis Colts	14	2	0	.875	6–0	10–2	416	307	L2
Houston Texans	9	7	0	.563	1–5	6–6	388	333	W4
Tennessee Titans	8	8	0	.500	2–4	4–8	354	402	W1
Jacksonville Jaguars	7	9	0	.438	3–3	6–6	290	380	L4

== Regular season results ==
=== Week 1: vs. New York Jets ===
Quarter	1	2	3	4	Total
Jets	3	7	7	7	24
Texans	0	0	0	7	7

at Reliant Stadium, Houston

- Game time: 1:00 pm EDT
- Game weather: None (Roof Closed)
- Game attendance: 70,118
- Referee: Ed Hochuli
- TV announcers (CBS): Jim Nantz & Phil Simms

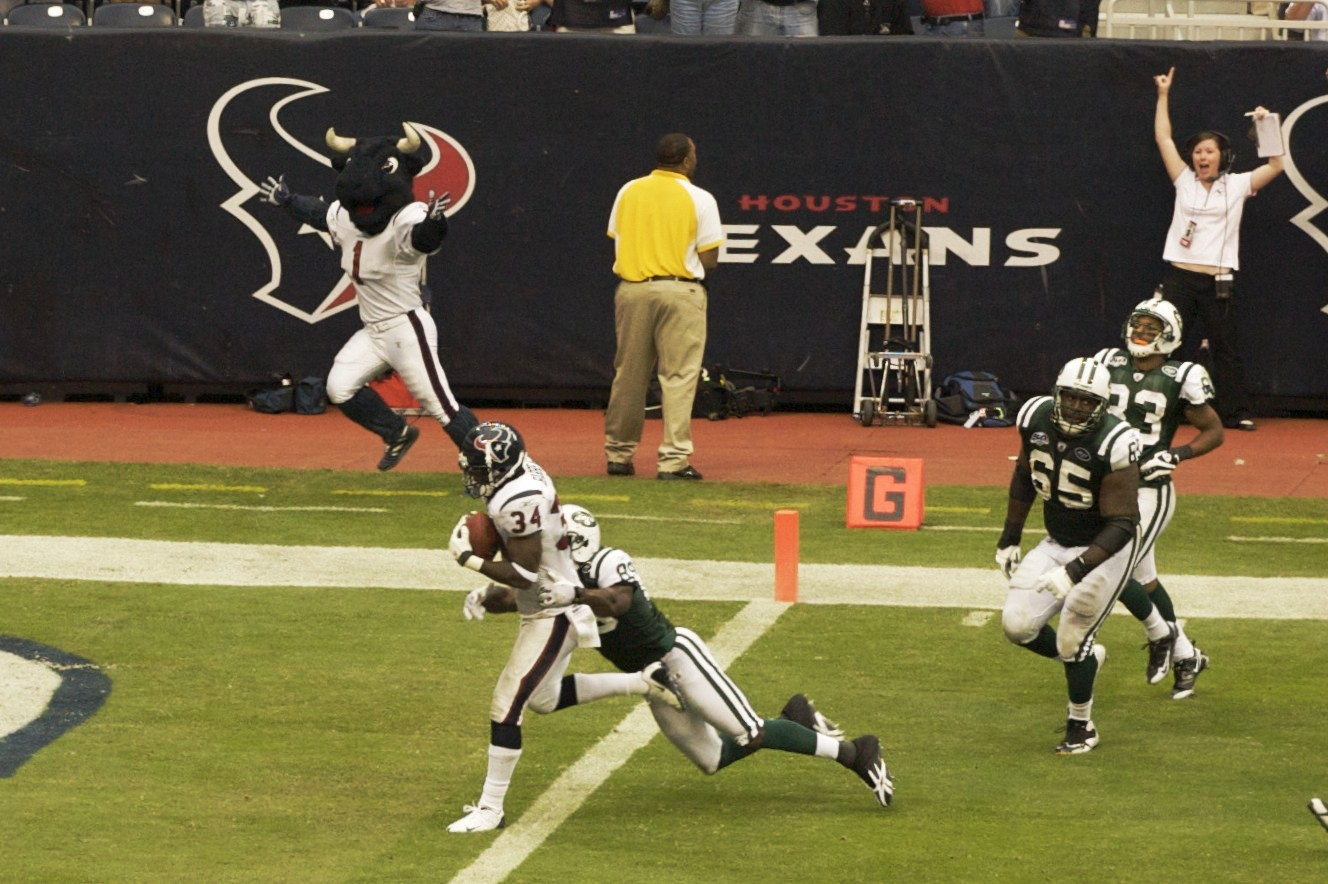
Safety Dominique Barber scored Houston's lone touchdown during the fourth quarter.

The Texans began their season with a Week 1 showdown with the New York Jets. Houston would trail in the first quarter as Jets kicker Jay Feely nailed a 24-yard field goal. The Texans' deficit would increase in the second quarter as quarterback Mark Sanchez completed a 30-yard touchdown pass to wide receiver Chansi Stuckey. Things only got worse for Houston in the third quarter when running back Thomas Jones scored on a 1-yard touchdown run. The Texans would get on the board as safety Dominique Barber returned a fumble 48 yards for a touchdown, but New York would seal the win with Jones' 38-yard touchdown run.

With the loss, Houston began its season at 0–1.

=== Week 2: at Tennessee Titans ===
Quarter	1	2	3	4	Total
Texans	7	17	7	3	34
Titans	14	10	7	0	31

at LP Field, Nashville, Tennessee

- Game time: 1:00 pm EDT
- Game weather: 77 °F (25 °C) (Cloudy)
- Game attendance: 69,143
- Referee: Walt Coleman
- TV announcers (CBS): Gus Johnson & Steve Tasker

Hoping to rebound from their loss to the Jets, the Texans flew to LP Field for a Week 2 divisional battle with the Tennessee Titans. Houston would trail early in the first quarter as Titans running back Chris Johnson got a 57-yard touchdown run. The Texans would respond with quarterback Matt Schaub completing a 19-yard touchdown pass to wide receiver Andre Johnson, but Tennessee replied with quarterback Kerry Collins completing a 69-yard touchdown to Johnson. The Titans would add onto their lead in the second quarter as Collins completed an 8-yard touchdown pass to wide receiver Nate Washington. Afterwards, Houston would take the lead as Schaub completed a 72-yard touchdown pass to Johnson and a 29-yard touchdown pass to wide receiver Jacoby Jones, along with kicker Kris Brown making a 38-yard field goal. Tennessee would tie the game to end the half as kicker Rob Bironas made a 40-yard field goal.

In the third quarter, the Titans got their lead again as Johnson got a 91-yard touchdown run. Afterwards, the Texans would tie the game as Schaub completed a 1-yard touchdown pass to tight end Owen Daniels. In the fourth quarter, Houston would take the lead as Brown nailed a 23-yard field goal. Afterwards, the defense prevented Tennessee from rallying.

With the win, the Texans improved to 1–1. It was the first road win against Tennessee since 2004.

=== Week 3: vs. Jacksonville Jaguars ===
Quarter	1	2	3	4	Total
Jaguars	3	14	7	7	31
Texans	7	14	3	0	24

at Reliant Stadium, Houston

- Game time: 1:00 pm EDT
- Game weather: None (Roof Closed)
- Game attendance: 70,083
- Referee: Ron Winter
- TV announcers (CBS): Bill Macatee & Steve Beuerlein

Coming off their hard-fought road win over the Titans, the Texans went home, donned their Battle Red uniforms, and prepared for a Week 3 AFC South showdown with the Jacksonville Jaguars. Even though the Jaguars got the first points of the game with kicker Josh Scobee's 52-yard field goal, Texans quarterback Matt Schaub got his team the lead with an 18-yard touchdown pass to wide receiver Jacoby Jones. Afterwards, a back-and-forth second quarter commenced. Jacksonville quarterback David Garrard would get a 2-yard touchdown, yet Houston wide receiver Kevin Walter came through with a 9-yard touchdown reception. The Jaguars would deliver a big strike with running back Maurice Jones-Drew's 61-yard touchdown, but the Texans once again got the lead as tight end Owen Daniels got a 2-yard touchdown reception.

Jacksonville would get the lead again in the third quarter as Jones-Drew got a 1-yard touchdown run, followed by Houston kicker Kris Brown tying the game with a 27-yard field goal. However, in the fourth quarter, the Jaguars delivered a huge strike as Jones-Drew got an 8-yard touchdown. The Texans tried to rally, but the Jaguars' defense stood firm and prevented any kind of a comeback.

With the loss, Houston fell to 1–2.

=== Week 4: vs. Oakland Raiders ===
Quarter	1	2	3	4	Total
Raiders	3	3	0	0	6
Texans	3	17	9	0	29

at Reliant Stadium, Houston

- Game time: 1:00 pm EDT
- Game weather: None (Dome Closed)
- Game attendance: 70,291
- Referee: Don Carey
- TV announcers (CBS): Gus Johnson & Steve Tasker

Hoping to rebound from their divisional loss to the Jaguars, the Texans stayed at home for a Week 4 duel with the Oakland Raiders. Houston delivered the opening shot of the first quarter with kicker Kris Brown's 26-yard field goal, followed by the Raiders tying the game with a 46-yard field goal from kicker Sebastian Janikowski. The Texans would take full command in the second quarter as Brown nailed a 34-yard field goal, followed by running back Steve Slaton getting a 32-yard touchdown run and catching an 18-yard touchdown pass from quarterback Matt Schaub. Oakland would close out the half with Janikowski's 33-yard field goal. In the third quarter, Houston would continue its domination with rookie linebacker Brian Cushing tackling Raiders running back Justin Fargas in his own endzone for a safety, immediately followed by wide receiver Jacoby Jones returning a kickoff 95 yards for a touchdown.

With the win, the Texans improved to 2–2.

=== Week 5: at Arizona Cardinals ===
Quarter	1	2	3	4	Total
Texans	0	0	7	14	21
Cardinals	7	14	0	7	28

at University of Phoenix Stadium, Glendale, Arizona

- Game time: 4:15 pm EDT
- Game weather: None (Dome Closed)
- Game attendance: 61,819
- Referee: Tony Corrente
- TV announcers (CBS): Ian Eagle & Rich Gannon

Coming off their home win over the Raiders, the Texans flew to the University of Phoenix Stadium for the first time ever for a Week 5 interconference duel with the Arizona Cardinals. Houston would trail in the first quarter as Cardinals running back Tim Hightower got a 1-yard touchdown run in the first quarter, followed by quarterback Kurt Warner completing a 9-yard and a 26-yard touchdown pass to wide receiver Larry Fitzgerald. Afterwards, the Texans began to rally as running back Chris Brown got a 1-yard touchdown run in the third quarter. Then, quarterback Matt Schaub would hook up with wide receiver Andre Johnson on an 11-yard and a 17-yard touchdown pass in the fourth quarter. However, Arizona would strike on two key plays. First, Cardinals cornerback Dominique Rodgers-Cromartie would intercept a pass from Schaub and return it 49 yards. Second, Arizona's defense held Houston's offense 1 yard out of the endzone three times.

With the loss, the Texans fell to 2–3.

=== Week 6: at Cincinnati Bengals ===
Quarter	1	2	3	4	Total
Texans	7	7	14	0	28
Bengals	0	0	17	0	17

at Paul Brown Stadium, Cincinnati

- Game time: 1:00 pm EDT
- Game weather: 49 °F (9 °C) (Sunny)
- Game attendance: 64,019
- Referee: Bill Leavy
- TV announcers (CBS): Don Criqui & Randy Cross

Hoping to rebound from their road loss to the Cardinals, the Texas flew to Paul Brown Stadium for a Week 6 duel with the Cincinnati Bengals. Houston would get off to a fast first quarter start as quarterback Matt Schaub found tight end Owen Daniels on a 12-yard touchdown pass. The Bengals answered in the second quarter with a 10-yard touchdown run from running back Cedric Benson, yet the Texans would reply with Schaub completing a 38-yard touchdown pass to running back Steve Slaton. Cincinnati would close out the half with quarterback Carson Palmer's 8-yard touchdown pass to wide receiver Laveranues Coles, followed by kicker Shayne Graham nailing a 50-yard field goal.

In the third quarter, Houston stormed right back with Schaub completing a 23-yard touchdown pass to wide receiver Jacoby Jones and a 7-yard touchdown pass to Daniels. Afterwards, the defense held to preserve the 11-point lead.

With the win, the Texans improved to 3–3.

=== Week 7: vs. San Francisco 49ers ===
Quarter	1	2	3	4	Total
49ers	0	0	7	14	21
Texans	7	14	0	3	24

at Reliant Stadium, Houston

- Game time: 1:00 pm EDT
- Game weather: 74 °F (23 °C) (Sunny)
- Game attendance: 70,820
- Referee: Mike Carey
- TV announcers (Fox): Chris Myers, Brian Billick & Nischelle Turner

Coming off their impressive road win over the Bengals, the Texans went home for a Week 7 interconference duel with the San Francisco 49ers. Houston would get off to a fast start in the first quarter as running back Steve Slaton got a 1-yard touchdown run. The Texans would add onto their lead in the second quarter as quarterback Matt Schaub completed a 9-yard touchdown pass to Slaton and a 42-yard touchdown pass to tight end Owen Daniels.

However, the 49ers began to rally in the third quarter with quarterback Alex Smith hooking up with tight end Vernon Davis on a 29-yard touchdown pass. In the fourth quarter, San Francisco continued to catch up as Smith found Davis again on a 14-yard touchdown pass. Houston would respond with kicker Kris Brown booting a 50-yard field goal. The 49ers tried to come back as Smith connected again with Davis on a 23-yard touchdown pass, yet the defense halted San Francisco's rally.

With the win, the Texans improved to 4–3.

The Texans would never beat the 49ers again until Week 8 of the 2025 season.

=== Week 8: at Buffalo Bills ===
Quarter	1	2	3	4	Total
Texans	0	6	3	22	31
Bills	7	3	0	0	10

at Ralph Wilson Stadium, Orchard Park, New York

- Game time: 1:00 pm EST
- Game weather: 49 °F (9 °C) (Partly Cloudy)
- Game attendance: 69,790
- Referee: Gene Steratore
- TV announcers (CBS): Ian Eagle & Rich Gannon

Coming off their home win over the 49ers, the Texans flew to Ralph Wilson Stadium for a Week 8 duel with the Buffalo Bills. Houston would trail in the first quarter as Bills wide receiver Terrell Owens got a 29-yard touchdown run. The Texans would get on the board in the second as kicker Kris Brown nailed a 42-yard and a 22-yard field goal. Buffalo would close out the half with a 21-yard field goal from kicker Rian Lindell.

The Texans would creep closer in the third quarter with Brown booting a 26-yard field goal. Afterwards, in the fourth quarter, Houston took the lead for good as running back Ryan Moats got an 11-yard (followed by quarterback Matt Schaub's 2-point conversion pass to wide receiver Andre Johnson), a 1-yard, and 3-yard touchdown run.

With the win, the Texans would improve to 5–3, their best start in franchise history.

=== Week 9: at Indianapolis Colts ===
Quarter	1	2	3	4	Total
Texans	0	3	7	7	17
Colts	10	3	0	7	20

at Lucas Oil Stadium, Indianapolis

- Game time: 1:00 pm EST
- Game weather: 69 °F (21 °C) (Sunny)
- Game attendance: 66,033
- Referee: Jeff Triplette
- TV announcers (CBS): Kevin Harlan & Solomon Wilcots

Coming off their road win over the Bills, the Texans flew to Lucas Oil Stadium for a Week 9 AFC South duel with the Indianapolis Colts. Houston would trail early in the first quarter as Colts quarterback Peyton Manning found running back Joseph Addai on a 7-yard touchdown pass, followed by a 22-yard field goal from kicker Matt Stover. Indianapolis would increase their lead in the second quarter with Stover's 37-yard field goal, yet the Texans closed out the half with kicker Kris Brown nailing a 56-yard field goal.

In the third quarter, Houston began to gain ground as quarterback Matt Schaub completed a 1-yard touchdown pass to running back Ryan Moats. The Texans would take the lead in the fourth quarter as running back Steve Slaton got a 1-yard touchdown run, but the Colts retook the lead with running back Joseph Addai getting a 2-yard touchdown run. Houston had a chance to tie the game with one second left in regulation, but Brown's 42-yard field goal attempt sailed wide left.

In what was another close game resulting in a tough loss, the Texans went into their bye week at 5–4.

=== Week 11: vs. Tennessee Titans ===
Quarter	1	2	3	4	Total
Titans	0	14	3	3	20
Texans	7	7	3	0	17

at Reliant Stadium, Houston

- Game time: 8:30 pm EST
- Game weather: 66 °F (19 °C) (Clear)
- Game attendance: 71,153
- Referee: Jerome Boger
- TV announcers (ESPN): Mike Tirico, Ron Jaworski, Jon Gruden & Michele Tafoya

Hoping to rebound from their loss to the Colts, the Texans went home for an AFC South rivalry match against the Tennessee Titans. In the first quarter Houston got on the board first as QB Matt Schaub got a 3-yard touchdown pass to RB Steve Slaton. In the second quarter the Titans replied with QB Vince Young completing a 13-yard touchdown pass to WR Kenny Britt. Then Houston tried to pull away as Schaub hooked up with WR Andre Johnson on a 13-yard touchdown pass, until the Titans replied again with RB LenDale White making a 1-yard touchdown run.

The Texans fell behind in the third quarter as kicker Rob Bironas made a 50-yard field goal, but came back to tie the game when kicker Kris Brown made a 26-yard field goal. In the fourth quarter the Titans scored for the win when Bironas got a 53-yard field goal.

With the loss, the Texans fell to 5–5.

=== Week 12: vs. Indianapolis Colts ===
Quarter	1	2	3	4	Total
Colts	0	7	7	21	35
Texans	14	6	0	7	27

at Reliant Stadium, Houston

- Game time: 1:00 pm EST
- Game weather: 75 °F (24 °C) (Mostly Cloudy)
- Game attendance: 70,990
- Referee: Alberto Riveron
- TV announcers (CBS): Greg Gumbel & Dan Dierdorf

The Texans were primed for an upset, heading to the lockers with a 20-7 halftime lead. But a big second half for the Colts ruined things as the Texans fell to 5-6.

=== Week 13: at Jacksonville Jaguars ===
Quarter	1	2	3	4	Total
Texans	0	7	5	6	18
Jaguars	3	17	3	0	23

at Jacksonville Municipal Stadium, Jacksonville, Florida

- Game time: 1:00 pm EST
- Game weather: 54 °F (12 °C) (Partly Cloudy)
- Game attendance: 42,709
- Referee: Terry McAulay
- TV announcers (CBS): Gus Johnson & Steve Tasker

=== Week 14: vs. Seattle Seahawks ===
Quarter	1	2	3	4	Total
Seahawks	0	7	0	0	7
Texans	17	7	10	0	34

at Reliant Stadium, Houston

- Game time: 1:00 pm EST
- Game weather: 50 °F (10 °C) (Cloudy)
- Game attendance: 70,380
- Referee: Pete Morelli
- TV announcers (Fox): Ron Pitts & John Lynch

=== Week 15: at St. Louis Rams ===
Quarter	1	2	3	4	Total
Texans	3	3	7	3	16
Rams	0	10	3	0	13

at Edward Jones Dome, St. Louis, Missouri

- Game time: 1:00 pm EST
- Game weather: None (Dome Stadium)
- Game attendance: 46,256
- Referee: Ed Hochuli
- TV announcers (CBS): Kevin Harlan & Solomon Wilcots

=== Week 16: at Miami Dolphins ===
Quarter	1	2	3	4	Total
Texans	10	17	0	0	27
Dolphins	0	3	7	10	20

at Land Shark Stadium, Miami Gardens, Florida

- Game time: 1:00 pm EST
- Game attendance: 65,847
- Referee: Ron Winter
- TV announcers (CBS): Ian Eagle & Rich Gannon

=== Week 17: vs. New England Patriots ===
Quarter	1	2	3	4	Total
Patriots	7	6	7	7	27
Texans	7	6	0	21	34

at Reliant Stadium, Houston, Texas

- Game time: 1:00 pm EST/12:00 pm CST
- Game weather: Played with roof closed, retractable roof stadium
- Game attendance: 71,029
- Referee: John Parry
- TV announcers (CBS): Kevin Harlan (play-by-play) and Solomon Wilcots (color commentator)

Houston earned its first ever winning season after 21 unanswered points in the fourth quarter. Tom Brady left and re-entered the game after reports that he had been playing for the past several weeks with three broken ribs emerged. Wes Welker received an injured knee early in the first quarter. This was the Texans' lone win versus New England until 2019.

Houston waited for the results of the Sunday Night Football contest later that night, as a Bengals victory over the Jets would earn them the #6 seed and the team’s first ever postseason appearance. However, the Jets defeated the Bengals, eliminating the Texans from playoff contention.

== Statistics ==
=== Team ===
Category	Total yards	Yards per game	NFL rank (out of 32)
Passing offense	4,654	290.9	1st
Rushing offense	1,475	92.2	29th
Total offense	6,129	383.1	4th
Passing defense	3,487	217.9	18th
Rushing defense	1,711	106.9	12th
Total defense	5,198	324.9	14th

=== Individual ===
Category	Player	Total
Offense
Passing yards	Matt Schaub	4,770
Passing touchdowns	Matt Schaub	29
Rushing yards	Steve Slaton	437
Rushing touchdowns	Ryan Moats	4
Receiving yards	Andre Johnson	1,569
Receiving touchdowns	Andre Johnson	9
Defense
Tackles (Solo)	DeMeco Ryans	93
Sacks	Mario Williams	9
Interceptions	Brian Cushing; Bernard Pollard	4
