= Dexter McCleon =

American football player (born 1973)

No. 24, 21, 22, 20
- Position: Cornerback

Personal information
- Born: October 9, 1973 (age 53); Meridian, Mississippi, U.S.
- Listed height: 5 ft 10 in (1.78 m)
- Listed weight: 195 lb (88 kg)

Career information
- High school: Meridian
- College: Clemson
- NFL draft: 1997: 2nd round, 40th overall pick

Career history
- St. Louis Rams (1997–2002); Kansas City Chiefs (2003–2005); Houston Texans (2006)

Awards and highlights
- Super Bowl champion (XXXIV); Second-team All-ACC (1996)

Career NFL statistics
- Tackles: 375
- Sacks: 4.5
- Passes defended: 87
- Interceptions: 31
- Stats at Pro Football Reference

Dexter Keith McCleon (born October 9, 1973) is an American former professional football player who was a cornerback in the National Football League (NFL). He played college football for the Clemson Tigers. McCleon played in the NFL for the St. Louis Rams, Kansas City Chiefs, and Houston Texans in his ten-year career that started in 1997. After his playing career, McCleon was a volunteer assistant football coach at Meridian High School in his hometown of Meridian, Mississippi.

== Early life ==
McCleon was an All-American quarterback at Meridian High School in Meridian, Mississippi, and was also a star baseball player there and got drafted in the 13th-round by the Minnesota Twins in the 1993 Major League Baseball draft but decided to play college football in Clemson University as a cornerback and also played baseball at Clemson.

== College career ==
At Clemson, McCleon was a two sport star as a quarterback in his early years and also a baseball player. He also was a First-team All-Atlantic Coast Conference as a senior and got drafted by the St. Louis Rams in the second round, 40th pick, of the 1997 NFL draft. McCleon is the only player in ACC Football history to be named ACC Player of the Week on Offense, Defense, and Special Teams all in the same season

== Professional career ==
=== St. Louis Rams ===
The St. Louis Rams selected McCleon in the second round (40th overall) of the 1997 NFL draft. He was the seventh cornerback drafted in 1997 and the first of two cornerbacks the Rams drafted, along with fifth round pick (158th overall) Taje Allen.

==== 1997 season ====
On July 5, 1997, the St. Louis Rams signed McCleon to a three—year, $1.63 million rookie contract that included an initial signing bonus of $700,000.

Throughout training camp, McCleon competed against free agent acquisition Ryan McNeil and fellow rookie Taje Allen for the vacant starting cornerback role that was previously held by the recently departed Anthony Parker. Head coach Dick Vermeil named McCleon a backup and listed him as the fourth cornerback on the depth chart, behind starting tandem Todd Lyght and Ryan McNeil and primary backup Taje Allen.

On August 31, 1997, McCleon made his professional regular season debut in the Rams' home-opener against the New Orleans Saints and recorded one solo tackle in their 24—38 victory. On October 19, 1997, McNeil earned his first career start as a dimeback and set a season-high with three solo tackles and made the first sack of his career on Warren Moon for a 10—yard loss during a 17—9 loss to the 1997 Seattle Seahawks. On November 30, 1997, McNeil made the first interception of his career on a pass attempt thrown by Gus Frerotte to wide receiver Michael Westbrook during a 23—20 victory at the Washington Redskins. He completed his rookie campaign with 13 solo tackles, one sack, and one interception in 16 games with one start.

==== 1998 season ====
The St. Louis Rams promoted defensive backs coach Peter Giunta to defensive coordinator following the retirement of Bud Carson. Throughout training camp, McCleon competed to possibly earn a starting role due to Ryan McNeil missing camp as a contract holdout. Head coach Dick Vermeil had McCleon start the first five games of the season (Weeks 1-4, 6) as the No. 2 cornerback until the return of Ryan McNeil. On September 20, 1998, McCleon set a season-high with seven combined tackles (six solo) and had his first interception of the season on a pass Rob Johnson attempted to throw to wide receiver Eric Moulds during a 34—33 win at the Buffalo Bills. He was inactive as the Rams lost 13—20 at the Carolina Panthers in Week 16 due to an ankle injury. He finished the 1998 NFL season with 29 combined tackles (28 solo) and two interceptions in 15 games and five starts.

==== 1999 season ====
Entering training camp, McCleon was slated to be the No. 2 starting cornerback following the departure of Ryan McNeil in free agency. Head coach Dick Vermeil named McCleon and Todd Lyght the starting cornerbacks to begin the regular season. He was sidelined for the Rams' 27—10 win against the Baltimore Ravens in their Week 1 home-opener due to a hamstring injury. On November 21, 1999, McCleon recorded four combined tackles (two solo), set a season-high with three pass break-ups, and made his first interception of the season on a pass Jeff Garcia threw to wide receiver Jerry Rice as the Rams won 23—7 at the San Francisco 49ers. In Week 16, he set a season-high with eight solo tackles as the Rams defeated the Chicago Bears 34—12. He finished the season with a total of 45 combined tackles (41 solo), 16 pass deflections, four interceptions, 1.5 sacks, and a forced fumble in 15 games and 15 starts.

The St. Louis Rams finished the 1999 NFL season first in the NFC West with a 13—3 record to clinch a playoff berth and a first-round bye. On January 16, 2000, McCleon started in his first career playoff appearance and recorded four solo tackles, made four pass deflections, and intercepted a pass Jeff George threw to Randy Moss as they won the NFC Divisional Game 37—49 against the Minnesota Vikings. The following week, the Rams defeated the Tampa Bay Buccaneers 11—6 in the NFC Championship Game to advance to the Super Bowl. On January 30, 2000, McCleon started at cornerback in Super Bowl XXXIV and recorded two solo tackles as the Rams defeated the Tennessee Titans 23—16. McCleon earned the first and only Super Bowl ring of his career.

==== 2000 season ====
On February 1, 2000, St. Louis Rams' head coach Dick Vermeil announced his decision to retire. Offensive coordinator Mike Martz who was credited for orchestrating The Greatest Show On Turf was immediately promoted to head coach. McCleon became a restricted free agent following the 1999 NFL season. On June 14, 2000, the St. Louis Rams re-signed McCleon to a one—year, $1.15 million contract.

He entered training camp slated to return as a starting cornerback over Dré Bly and rookie second round pick Jacoby Shepherd. Head coach Mike Martz named McCleon and Todd Lyght the starting cornerbacks to begin the regular season. In Week 10, he set a season-high with six solo tackles, had two pass break-ups, and intercepted a pass by Steve Beuerlein during a 27—24 loss to the Carolina Panthers. The following game, McCleon made four solo tackles, two pass deflections, intercepted a pass attempt by Kerry Collins, and set a career-high with his second sack of the season during a 38—24 win against the New York Giants in Week 11. On November 20, 2000, McCleon made three combined tackles (two solo), set a season-high with three pass break-ups, and intercepted Jeff George's pass attempt to fullback Stephen Davis as the Rams lost 33—20 to the Washington Redskins. He had an interception in three consecutive games following this performance. On December 18, 2000, McCleon made two solo tackles, two pass deflections, and set a season-high with two interceptions on passes thrown by Shaun King during a 35—38 loss at the Tampa Bay Buccaneers. For the first time in his career, McCleon started all 16 games and had one of the best seasons of his career statistically, setting career-highs in pass deflections (19), interceptions (8), and sacks (2). He also made 54 combined tackles (45 solo), a forced fumble, and a fumble recovery. On January 2, 2001, the St. Louis Rams fired defensive coordinator Peter Giunta after a first round exit in the playoffs following a 28—31 loss at the New Orleans Saints in the NFC Wild-Card Game.

==== 2001 season ====
On January 8, 2001, the St. Louis Rams hired Tampa Bay Buccaneers' linebackers coach Lovie Smith as their new defensive coordinator. The Rams acquired cornerback Aeneas Williams in a trade in order to replace Todd Lyght who departed in free agency. Head coach Mike Martz named McCleon a starting cornerback to begin the regular season alongside Aeneas Williams.

On September 9, 2001, McCleon started in the Rams' season-opener at the Philadelphia Eagles and set a season-high with nine solo tackles as they won 20—17. In Week 5, he recorded three solo tackles, made two pass break-ups, and intercepted a pass Kerry Collins attempted to throw to wide receiver Amani Toomer during a 15—14 win at the New York Giants. On December 23, 2001, McCleon made three solo tackles, two pass deflections, and returned a fumble recovery for the first touchdown of his career during a 38—32 win at the Carolina Panthers. He scored his first career touchdown late in the second quarter after he recovered a fumble by longsnapper Jason Kyle and returned it for a 29—yard touchdown. He started all 16 games for the second consecutive season and recorded a career-high 65 combined tackles (59 solo), made 18 pass deflections, four interceptions, a forced fumble, a fumble recovery, and scored the first and only touchdown of his caeeer.

The St. Louis Rams finished the 2001 NFL season first in the NFC West with a 14—2 record to earn a playoff berth and first round bye. On January 20, 2002, McCleon made two combined tackles (one solo), a pass deflection, and intercepted a pass Brett Favre attempted to throw to wide receiver Antonio Freeman as they defeated the Green Bay Packers 17—45 in the NFC Divisional Round. The following game, the Rams defeated the Philadelphia Eagles in the NFC Championship Game. On February 3, 2002, McCleon started in Super Bowl XXXVI against the New England Patriots and recorded five solo tackles as they lost 17—20.

==== 2002 season ====
Throughout training camp, McCleon competed against Dré Bly to retain his role as the No. 2 starting cornerback after regressing the previous season. Head coach Mike Martz named McCleon a backup and listed him as the thitd cornerback on the depth chart to begin the regular season, behind starting tandem Aeneas Williams and Dré Bly. He was sidelined fof three games (Weeks 4—6) due to a hamstring injury that would plague him throughout the season. On November 10, 2002,McCleon made one solo tackle, one pass deflection, and secured the Rams' 28—24 victory against the San Diego Chargers by intercepting a pass attemot by Drew Brees with 18 seconds remaining. In Week 16, he set a season-high with four combined tackles (three solo) during a 30—10 loss at the Seattle Seahawks. He finished the season with 23 combined tackles (19 solo), two pass deflections, a forced fumble, and one interception in 13 games and four starts.

==== 2003 season ====
On February 28, 2003, the St. Louis Rams released McCleon due to salary cap concerns, saving $3.90 million from his expected salary.

=== Kansas City Chiefs ===
On March 4, 2003, the Kansas City Chiefs signed McCleon to a five—year, $11.15 million contract that included an initial signing bonus of $2.00 million. He was reunited with head coach Dick Vermeil and secondary coach Peter Giunta. Head coach Dick Vermeil named McCleon a starting cornerback to begin the season, alongside Eric Warfield.

On September 21, 2003, McCleon made four combined tackles (three solo), one pass break-up, and made his first interception as part of the Chiefs on a pass David Carr threw to wide receiver Andre Johnson during a 42—14 victory at the Houston Texans. On September 28, 2003, McCleon recorded five combined tackles (four solo), set a season-high with three pass deflections, and made two interceptions on pass attempts by Kyle Boller during a 17—10 win at the Baltimore Ravens. In Week 5, he set a season-high with seven combined tackles (six solo) and had one pass deflection during a 24—23 win against the Denver Broncos. In Week 7, McCleon made five combined tackles (four solo), one pass deflection, and made a key interception after picking off a pass thrown by Marques Tuiasosopo that led to the winning touchdown as the Chiefs won 17—10 at the Oakland Raiders. He started all 16 games throughout the 2003 NFL season and finished with 60 combined tackles (55 solo), 16 pass deflections, six interceptions, and two fumble recoveries.

==== 2004 season ====
He returned as the No. 2 starting cornerback to begin the season alongside Eric Warfield. In Week 6, he set a season-high with seven combined tackles (five solo) and one pass break-up during a 16—22 loss at the Jacksonville Jaguars. He was inactive for three consecutive games (Weeks 8—10) after injuring his hamstring. During his absence, cornerback William Bartee replaced him in the starting lineup. Defensive coordinator Gunther Cunningham elected to keep William Bartee as a starting cornerback upon McCleon's return from injury. Entering Week 15, McCleon regained his starting cornerback role from William Bartee and remained a starter for the last three games of the season. On December 19, 2004, McCleon made four combined tackles (two solo), two pass break-ups, and set a season-high with two interceptions on pass attempts by Jake Plummer as the Chiefs defeated the Denver Broncos 45—17. He finished with 36 combined tackles (30 solo), nine pass deflections, and two interceptions in 13 games and six starts.

==== 2005 season ====
Entering training camp, McCleon was slated to become the starting nickelback after the Chiefs signed Patrick Surtain to takeover as a starting outside cornerback. During the off-season, starting cornerback Eric Warfield was arrested for a DUI and was expected to be suspended to start the season. The Chiefs promoted Julian Battle to start in his absence. Head coach Dick Vermeil named McCleon a starting cornerback to begin the regular season after Julian Battle suffered a torn Achilles in training camp.

On September 1, 2005, McCleon set a season-high with six solo tackles as the Chiefs defeated the New York Jets 27—7. He was inactive for four consecutive games (Weeks 7—10) after suffering a groin injury. Upon his return, he was designated as a backup cornerback after Eric Warfield remained as the No. 2 starting cornerback for the rest of the season. He finished the season with 21 combined tackles (20 solo), seven pass deflections, and two interceptions in 12 games and 5 starts.

==== 2006 season ====
On March 10, 2006, the Kansas City Chiefs cut McCleon as a result of salary cap concerns.

=== Houston Texans ===
On July 29, 2006, the Houston Texans signed McCleon to a one—year contract in order to provide depth following injuries to Phillip Buchanon and DeMarcus Faggins. Upon his arrival, he competed against Lewis Sanders for the job as the starting nickelback.

In Week 11, he set a season-high with six solo tackles during a 21—24 loss to the Buffalo Bills. On December 3, 2006, McCleon made four solo tackles, one pass deflection, a forced fumble, and had his last career interception on a pass attempt by Aaron Brooks during a 23—14 win at the Oakland Raiders. He finished the 2007 NFL season with 29 combined tackles (22 solo), one pass break-up, a forced fumble, and one interception in 16 games and five starts.

==== 2007 season ====
On August 24, 2007, the Houston Texans released McCleon as part of their roster cuts.

== Career statistics ==
Year	Team	GP	COMB	TOTAL	AST	SACK	FF	FR	FR YDS	INT	IR YDS	AVG IR	LNG	TD	PD
1997	STL	16	13	13	00	1.0	0	0	0	1	00	00	00	0	02
1998	STL	15	29	28	01	0.0	0	0	0	2	29	15	15	0	06
1999	STL	15	45	41	04	1.5	1	0	0	4	17	04	14	0	16
2000	STL	16	54	49	05	2.0	0	1	0	8	28	04	23	0	19
2001	STL	16	64	58	06	0.0	1	1	0	4	66	17	43	1	18
2002	STL	13	22	18	04	0.0	1	1	0	1	00	00	00	0	02
2003	KC	16	60	55	05	0.0	0	2	0	6	-3	-1	00	0	14
2004	KC	13	36	30	06	0.0	0	1	0	2	23	12	23	0	09
2005	KC	12	21	20	01	0.0	0	0	0	2	00	00	00	0	07
2006	HOU	16	29	22	07	0.0	1	0	0	1	19	19	19	0	01
Career		148	373	334	39	4.5	4	6	0	31	179	6	43	1	94

== Personal life ==
McCleon finished a 10-year NFL career with 31 career interceptions. After a pro career, he went on to coach for his alma mater Meridian High School Wildcats for two years. McCleon has a son, Dexter Jr., who is a top high school baseball prospect. He resides in Buford, GA.
