= Dunta Robinson =

American football player (born 1982)

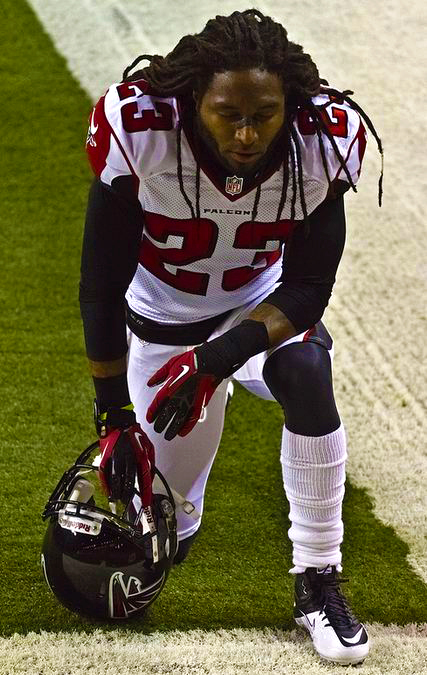
- Robinson with the Atlanta Falcons in 2012

No. 23, 21
- Position: Cornerback

Personal information
- Born: April 11, 1982 (age 44); Athens, Georgia, U.S.
- Listed height: 5 ft 10 in (1.78 m)
- Listed weight: 183 lb (83 kg)

Career information
- High school: Clarke Central (Athens)
- College: South Carolina (2000–2003)
- NFL draft: 2004: 1st round, 10th overall pick

Career history
- Houston Texans (2004–2009); Atlanta Falcons (2010–2012); Kansas City Chiefs (2013)

Awards and highlights
- PFWA Defensive Rookie of the Year (2004); PFWA All-Rookie Team (2004)

Career NFL statistics
- Total tackles: 591
- Sacks: 5.5
- Forced fumbles: 7
- Fumble recoveries: 2
- Interceptions: 17
- Defensive touchdowns: 1
- Stats at Pro Football Reference

Willie Dunta Robinson (/ˈdɒnteɪ/ DON-tay; born April 11, 1982) is an American former professional football player who was a cornerback in the National Football League (NFL). He played college football for the South Carolina Gamecocks and was selected by the Houston Texans with the 10th overall selection in the 2004 NFL draft. Robinson also played for the Atlanta Falcons and Kansas City Chiefs.

== Early life ==
Robinson attended Clarke Central High School in Athens, Georgia, and was a three-sport standout in football, basketball, and track. As a senior for the Gladiators football team, he had four interceptions and eight passes defended. On offense, he rushed for six touchdowns, and ran back a punt and a kickoff for touchdowns. In track, he ran the 100m in 10.93 seconds, and was the state champion in the long jump (7.24m).

== College career ==
Despite graduating from Clarke Central High School in the literal shadow of the University of Georgia, Robinson committed and signed his national letter of intent to play his college football for legendary coach Lou Holtz at the University of South Carolina on February 7, 2000.

== Professional career ==
Pre-draft measurables
Height	Weight	Arm length	Hand span	40-yard dash	10-yard split	20-yard split	20-yard shuttle	Three-cone drill	Vertical jump	Broad jump	Bench press
5 ft 10 5/8 in (1.79 m)	186 lb (84 kg)	30 5/8 in (0.78 m)	9 1/4 in (0.23 m)	4.34 s	1.54 s	2.51 s	3.75 s	6.97 s	36 in (0.91 m)	10 ft 0 in (3.05 m)	15 reps
All values from NFL Combine

=== Houston Texans ===
Robinson was selected by the Houston Texans in the first round with the 10th overall pick in the 2004 NFL draft. He immediately became a starter, starting all 16 games at right cornerback for the Texans in his rookie season, recording 87 tackles and six interceptions. During the 2008 season, Robinson became the all-time Texans' interception leader passing Aaron Glenn with 13 career interceptions.

On February 19, 2009, Robinson became the first Texan in franchise history to be given the franchise tag. Upset at receiving the tag, Robinson subsequently sat out all of Texans training camp before finally signing a one-year, $9.957 million tender a week before the 2009 NFL season began. In the Texans' first game against the New York Jets, Robinson's shoes bore the message "Pay Me Rick," directed at Texans' General Manager Rick Smith. Robinson was fined $25,000 by the NFL for wearing the shoes.

=== Atlanta Falcons ===
On March 5, 2010, as an unrestricted free agent, Robinson signed a six-year contract with the Atlanta Falcons worth $54 million with $22.5 million in guaranteed money.

Robinson was fined $50,000 for an illegal hit on a defenseless player when he hit Eagles wide receiver DeSean Jackson on October 17, 2010, in Philadelphia.

On September 18, 2011, Robinson made another illegal helmet-to-helmet hit on Eagles wide receiver Jeremy Maclin. The NFL fined him $40,000.

On March 1, 2013, in a mildly surprising and abrupt move to clear salary cap space, Robinson was released by the Falcons. It was also speculated that the Falcons had grown less enamored with Robinson after his repeated personal fouls for illegal hits and a perceived low return on their $54 million investment. Former All Pro running back Michael Turner and All Pro defensive end John Abraham were also released at the same time by the Falcons as salary cap casualties.

=== Kansas City Chiefs ===
Robinson signed with the Kansas City Chiefs on March 8, 2013. On February 7, 2014, Robinson was released by the Chiefs.

== NFL career statistics ==
Legend
**Bold**	Career high

Year	Team	GP	Tackles				Fumbles			Interceptions					
Year	Team	GP	Cmb	Solo	Ast	Sck	FF	FR	TD	Int	Yds	Avg	Lng	TD	PD
2004	HOU	16	87	**73**	14	**3.0**	**3**	0	0	**6**	**146**	**24**	**61**	0	**19**
2005	HOU	16	**88**	69	**19**	1.0	1	0	0	1	1	1	1	0	10
2006	HOU	16	83	70	13	0.0	1	0	0	2	9	5	9	**1**	12
2007	HOU	9	34	29	5	0.0	0	0	0	2	6	3	10	0	7
2008	HOU	11	38	35	3	0.0	0	0	0	2	0	0	0	0	6
2009	HOU	16	64	54	10	0.0	1	0	0	0	0	0	0	0	9
2010	ATL	15	55	52	3	0.0	0	**1**	0	1	0	0	0	0	7
2011	ATL	16	49	39	10	0.0	0	0	0	2	28	14	14	0	9
2012	ATL	16	80	67	13	1.5	1	0	0	1	4	4	4	0	8
2013	KC	8	13	13	0	0.0	0	1	0	0	0	0	0	0	4
Career		139	591	501	90	5.5	7	2	0	17	194	11	61	1	91
