= Wali Lundy =

American football running back (born 1983)

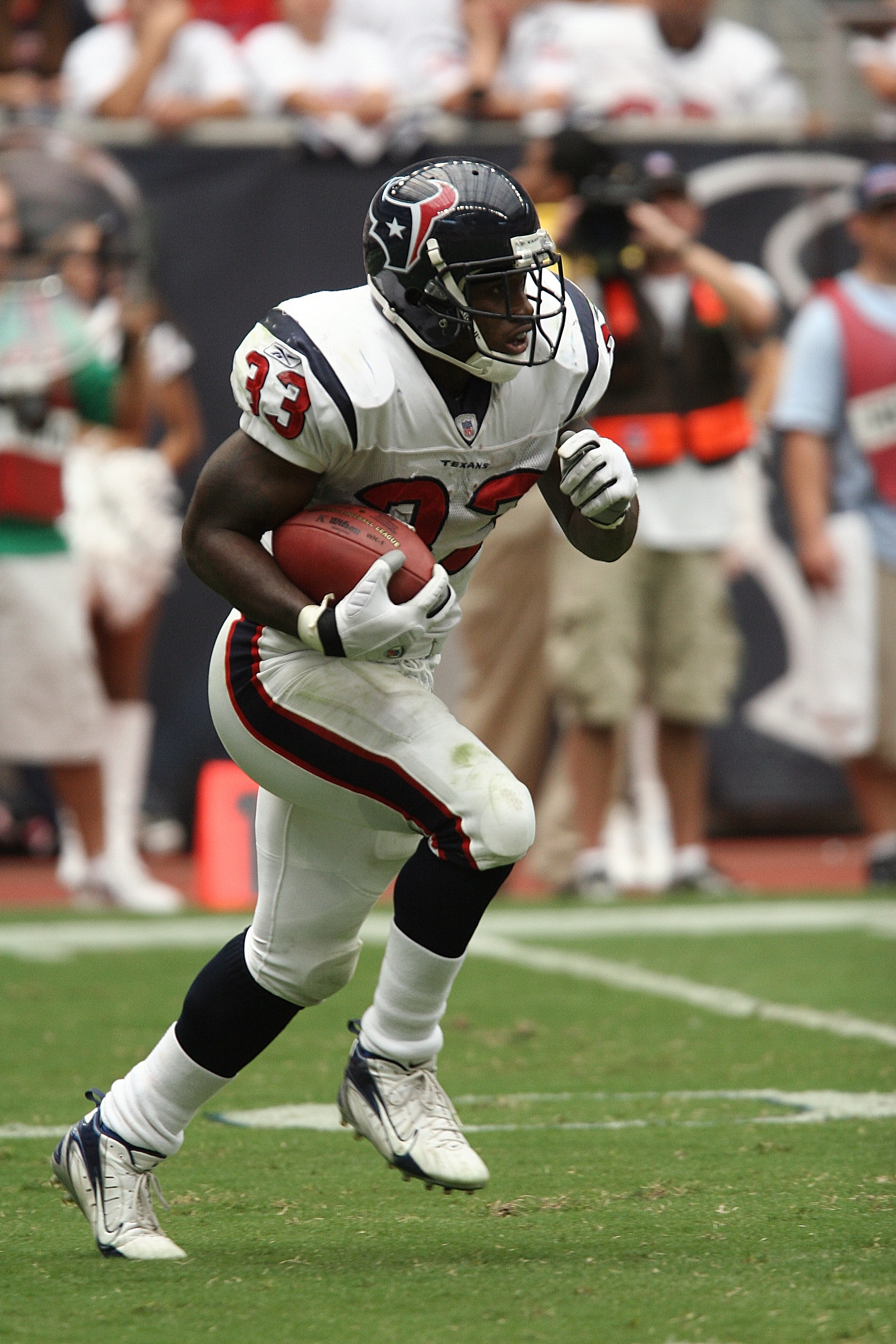
- Lundy with the Houston Texans in 2006

No. 33
- Position: Running back

Personal information
- Born: September 8, 1983 (age 43); New Brunswick, New Jersey, U.S.
- Listed height: 5 ft 11 in (1.80 m)
- Listed weight: 214 lb (97 kg)

Career information
- High school: Holy Cross (Delran Township, New Jersey)
- College: Virginia
- NFL draft: 2006: 6th round, 170th overall pick

Career history
- Houston Texans (2006)

Awards and highlights
- Second-team All-ACC (2003)

Career NFL statistics
- Rushing attempts: 124
- Rushing yards: 476
- Rushing touchdowns: 4
- Receptions: 33
- Receiving yards: 204
- Stats at Pro Football Reference

Wali Sultan Lundy (born September 8, 1983) is an American former professional football player who was a running back for the National Football League (NFL). Lundy was selected in the sixth round of the 2006 NFL draft, after playing college football for the Virginia Cavaliers.

== Early life ==
Wali started his career at Holy Cross High School in Delran Township, New Jersey, where he broke the records for rushing and most touchdowns. He had previously attended Florence Township Memorial High School in Florence Township, New Jersey, where he played for the Flashes.

== College career ==
He holds many Virginia Cavaliers records and Atlantic Coast Conference records, including being the all-time touchdown leader in ACC history with 52 touchdowns. He played in 49 games at the University of Virginia, where he rushed for 3,193 yards, the fifth-highest total ever in school history, and 4,497 all-purpose yards.

== Professional career ==
Pre-draft measurables
Height	Weight	Arm length	Hand span	40-yard dash	10-yard split	20-yard split	20-yard shuttle	Three-cone drill	Vertical jump	Broad jump	Bench press
5 ft 11 in (1.80 m)	214 lb (97 kg)	31 1/2 in (0.80 m)	9 1/2 in (0.24 m)	4.45 s	1.58 s	2.63 s	4.36 s	6.99 s	35.0 in (0.89 m)	9 ft 3 in (2.82 m)	18 reps
All values from NFL Combine

It was announced on August 29, 2006, that Texans running back Domanick Davis would be unable to start the team's first regular season game due to a lingering knee injury. Houston Head Coach Gary Kubiak stated that Lundy would start the first game of his rookie campaign in Davis's place. Lundy stepped up for 476 yards and four touchdowns in his rookie season. On August 31, 2007, the Texans released him.

== Music career ==
In a 2004 interview with Sports Illustrated, Lundy suggested he would aspire to be a rap artist if football didn't work out. In 2010, he partnered with producer Jase Harley and established a collective called Fresh Fuzion. He is a founding member of Fresh Fuzion.
