= Charles Spencer (American football) =

American football player (born 1982)

No. 77
- Position: Offensive tackle

Personal information
- Born: March 17, 1982 (age 44); Poughkeepsie, New York, U.S.
- Listed height: 6 ft 4 in (1.93 m)
- Listed weight: 338 lb (153 kg)

Career information
- High school: Poughkeepsie
- College: Pittsburgh
- NFL draft: 2006: 3rd round, 65th overall pick

Career history
- Houston Texans (2006–2007); Carolina Panthers (2008)*; Jacksonville Jaguars (2008); Florida Tuskers (2009)
- * Offseason or practice squad member only

Awards and highlights
- 2× Second-team All-Big East (2004–2005)

Career NFL statistics
- Games played: 2
- Games started: 2
- Stats at Pro Football Reference

Charles J. Spencer Jr. (born March 17, 1982) is an American former professional football player who was an offensive tackle in the National Football League (NFL). He was selected by the Houston Texans in the third round of the 2006 NFL draft. He played college football for the Pittsburgh Panthers.

Spencer was also a member of the Carolina Panthers, Jacksonville Jaguars, and the UFL's Florida Tuskers.

== Professional career ==
Pre-draft measurables
Height	Weight	Arm length	Hand span	40-yard dash	10-yard split	20-yard split	Bench press
6 ft 4 3/4 in (1.95 m)	352 lb (160 kg)	33 7/8 in (0.86 m)	10 1/4 in (0.26 m)	5.29 s	1.87 s	3.06 s	30 reps
All values from NFL Combine

=== Houston Texans ===
Two games into the 2006 season, Spencer suffered a broken leg and was out for the year. He missed the entire 2007 season due to this injury as well. He was released on July 22, 2008.

=== Carolina Panthers ===
A day after being waived by the Texans, Spencer was claimed off waivers by the Carolina Panthers. He was waived again on August 7, with Panthers head coach John Fox citing "conditioning and weight" as the reason.

=== Jacksonville Jaguars ===
On September 3, 2008, Spencer was signed by the Jacksonville Jaguars. The move came a day after Jaguars offensive tackle Richard Collier was shot and hospitalized with life-threatening injuries. Collier was placed on the reserve/non-football injury list to make room for Spencer on the roster. He was waived on December 21 without having played a game for the Jaguars.

Spencer was re-signed to a future contract by the Jaguars on January 12, 2009. However, he was released on April 29, 2009.

=== Florida Tuskers ===
On July 21, 2009, Spencer agreed to contract terms with the Florida Tuskers of the newly formed United Football League.
