= Chris Taylor (running back) =

American football player (born 1983)

No. 27
- Position: Running back

Personal information
- Born: November 7, 1983 (age 42); Memphis, Tennessee, U.S.
- Listed height: 6 ft 0 in (1.83 m)
- Listed weight: 225 lb (102 kg)

Career information
- College: Indiana
- NFL draft: 2006: undrafted

Career history
- Houston Texans (2006–2008); New England Patriots (2009); New Orleans Saints (2010-2012)*
- * Offseason or practice squad member only

Career NFL statistics
- Rushing attempts: 42
- Rushing yards: 160
- Rushing touchdowns: 1
- Receptions: 3
- Receiving yards: 40
- Stats at Pro Football Reference

Christopher Taylor (born November 7, 1983) is an American former professional football player who was a running back in the National Football League (NFL). He was signed by the Houston Texans as an undrafted free agent in 2006. He was also a member of the New England Patriots and New Orleans Saints. He played college football for the Indiana Hoosiers.

== Early life ==
Taylor attended Cordova High School in Memphis, Tennessee.

== College career ==
After graduating from high school, Taylor attended Indiana University Bloomington. In his true freshman season in 2002, Taylor played in six games, rushing for 229 yards. In 2003, Taylor rushed for 464 yards and three touchdowns. He started two games in 2004, rushing for 323 yards. In his senior season in 2005, Taylor played in all 11 games and ran for 740 yards and four touchdowns.

== Professional career ==
=== Houston Texans ===
Taylor was signed by the Houston Texans in May 2006 after going undrafted in the 2006 NFL draft. He was released by the Texans on September 3 and re-signed on September 9. He was inactive for the Texans' season opener and was waived on September 11 before being re-signed to the team's practice squad. He was elevated back to the 53-man roster on December 6, where he spent the remainder of the season. Taylor missed all of the 2007 season after being placed on injured reserve on July 30 with a knee injury. He was on the 53-man roster for the first six games of the 2008 season for the Texans before again suffering an injury and going on injured reserve. He reached an injury settlement and was released by the Texans in October 2008.

=== New England Patriots ===
After spending the rest of the 2008 season out of football, Taylor was signed by the New England Patriots on August 17, 2009. He was placed on injured reserve on September 5 with a shoulder injury. After spending the season on injured reserve, he was not tendered a qualifying offer as a restricted free agent by the team. He was re-signed by the Patriots on May 10, 2010. The Patriots released Taylor during final cuts on September 4, 2010.

=== New Orleans Saints ===
Taylor was signed to the practice squad of the New Orleans Saints on October 13, 2010. He was released on October 23, 2010, and re-signed to the practice squad on October 27, 2010. He was again released from the practice squad on November 7, 2010. He was re-signed to the practice squad on November 10, 2010. He was released again on November 20, 2010. He was re-signed again to the practice squad on November 23, 2010. He was released again on December 5, 2010, and re-signed to the practice squad on December 8, 2010. He was placed on injured reserve on August 30, 2011. He was re-signed on January 18, 2012, before being waived again on June 8, 2012
