= Chris White (offensive lineman) =

American football player (born 1983)

No. 68, 63
- Position: Center / Guard

Personal information
- Born: February 28, 1983 (age 43); Winona, Mississippi, U.S.
- Listed height: 6 ft 2 in (1.88 m)
- Listed weight: 303 lb (137 kg)

Career information
- High school: Winona
- College: Southern Mississippi
- NFL draft: 2005: undrafted

Career history
- Green Bay Packers (2005–2006); Houston Texans (2006–2009); Seattle Seahawks (2010); New York Giants (2011–2012)*
- * Offseason or practice squad member only

Career NFL statistics
- Games played: 33
- Games started: 8
- Stats at Pro Football Reference

Chris La Bryant White (born February 28, 1983) is an American former professional football player who was a center in the National Football League (NFL). He played college football for the Southern Miss Golden Eagles and was signed by the Green Bay Packers as an undrafted free agent in 2005. He was also a member of the Houston Texans, Seattle Seahawks and New York Giants.
