= DeMarcus Faggins =

American football player (born 1979)

No. 38
- Position: Cornerback

Personal information
- Born: June 13, 1979 (age 47); Irving, Texas, U.S.
- Listed height: 5 ft 10 in (1.78 m)
- Listed weight: 182 lb (83 kg)

Career information
- High school: Irving
- College: Kansas State
- NFL draft: 2002: 6th round, 173rd overall pick

Career history
- Houston Texans (2002–2008); Tennessee Titans (2009)*; Detroit Lions (2009); Omaha Nighthawks (2010–2012)
- * Offseason or practice squad member only

Career NFL statistics
- Total tackles: 221
- Sacks: 1
- Forced fumbles: 3
- Fumble recoveries: 3
- Interceptions: 5
- Defensive touchdowns: 2
- Stats at Pro Football Reference

DeMarcus Faggins (born June 13, 1979) is an American former professional football player who was a cornerback in the National Football League (NFL). He was selected by the Houston Texans in the sixth round of the 2002 NFL draft. He played college football for the Kansas State Wildcats.

Faggins was also a member of the Tennessee Titans, Detroit Lions and Omaha Nighthawks.

== Early life ==
Faggins attended Irving High School in Irving, Texas and was a student and a letterman in football. In football, as a senior, he was a first-team All-City selection and a second-team All-State selection. Faggins was inducted in the Irving Independent School District Athletic Hall of Fame in 2016.

== NFL career statistics ==
Legend
	Led the league
**Bold**	Career high

Year	Team	Games		Tackles					Interceptions					Fumbles			
Year	Team	GP	GS	Cmb	Solo	Ast	Sck	TFL	Int	Yds	TD	Lng	PD	FF	FR	Yds	TD
2002	HOU	2	0	1	1	0	0.0	0	0	0	0	0	0	0	0	0	0
2003	HOU	8	1	17	14	3	0.0	0	0	0	0	0	7	0	0	0	0
2004	HOU	**16**	2	45	41	4	0.0	0	**3**	**47**	**1**	**43**	9	0	0	0	0
2005	HOU	13	**10**	**50**	**42**	**8**	0.0	0	0	0	0	0	6	0	0	0	0
2006	HOU	11	**10**	30	27	3	**1.0**	**2**	2	0	0	0	**10**	1	**2**	**58**	**1**
2007	HOU	**16**	8	46	40	6	0.0	1	0	0	0	0	4	**2**	1	0	0
2008	HOU	**16**	5	28	23	5	0.0	0	0	0	0	0	2	0	0	0	0
2009	DET	2	0	4	4	0	0.0	0	0	0	0	0	0	0	0	0	0
Career		84	36	221	192	29	1.0	3	5	47	1	43	38	3	3	58	1
