= Tim Bulman =

American football player (born 1982)

No. 93
- Position: Defensive end

Personal information
- Born: October 31, 1982 (age 44); Milton, Massachusetts, U.S.
- Listed height: 6 ft 4 in (1.93 m)
- Listed weight: 281 lb (127 kg)

Career information
- High school: Boston College (Boston, Massachusetts)
- College: Boston College
- NFL draft: 2005: undrafted

Career history
- Arizona Cardinals (2005); Houston Texans (2006–2011); New England Patriots (2012)*
- * Offseason or practice squad member only

Awards and highlights
- Second-team All-Big East (2004)

Career NFL statistics
- Total tackles: 58
- Sacks: 4
- Fumble recoveries: 1
- Pass deflections: 3
- Stats at Pro Football Reference

Timothy Ryan Bulman (born October 31, 1982) is an American former professional football player who was a defensive end in the National Football League (NFL). He was signed by the Arizona Cardinals as an undrafted free agent in 2005 after playing college football for the Boston College Eagles. Bulman later played for the Houston Texans and spent time with the New England Patriots during the 2012 offseason.

== College career ==
Bulman played in 49 games for Boston College, starting 21 times. He recorded 160 tackles (111 solo), 10.5 sacks, 38 tackles for loss, 36 quarterback pressures, two forced fumbles, two fumble recoveries, one blocked kick, and 17 pass breakups. He was named a Second-team All-Big East selection as a senior in 2004. That same year, he was honored with Boston College's Scanlan Award, the highest recognition given to a Boston College football player for excellence in athletics, academics, and community involvement. Bulman also served as a team tri-captain during his senior season.

== Professional career ==
=== Arizona Cardinals ===
Bulman was signed by the Arizona Cardinals as an undrafted free agent on April 25, 2005. He attended training camp with the team but was initially released and subsequently signed to the Cardinals' practice squad. Following a series of injuries to the defensive line, Bulman was promoted to the active roster and saw significant playing time for the remainder of the season. He was released by the Cardinals on September 2, 2006.

=== Houston Texans ===
Bulman was signed to the Houston Texans' practice squad on October 10, 2006, and was promoted to the active roster on December 23, 2006. He did not record any statistics during the 2006 season. In 2007, he appeared in two games and recorded three tackles. In 2008, he played in 14 games, primarily as a rotational defensive lineman, and registered four sacks, the second-highest total on the team that season. Bulman was released on September 14, 2011, to make room on the roster for wide receiver David Anderson, but was re-signed two days later, on September 16.

=== New England Patriots ===
On July 25, 2012, Bulman signed a one-year contract with the New England Patriots. He was released by the team on August 27, 2012.

== Post-playing career ==
In 2012, Bulman and his brother founded Incremental Development, a Boston-based commercial real estate acquisition company.
