= Rick Smith (American football executive) =

American football executive (born 1969)

Personal information
- Born: September 3, 1969 (age 57)

Career information
- High school: Dayton (OH) Meadowdale
- College: Purdue

Career history

Coaching
- Purdue (1992) Graduate assistant, strength and conditioning coordinator; Purdue (1993) Graduate assistant, tight ends coach; Purdue (1994–1995) Secondary coach; Denver Broncos (1996–1999) Assistant defensive backs coach

Operations
- Denver Broncos (2000–2005) Director of pro personnel; Houston Texans (2006–2017) General manager; Houston Texans (2012–2017) Executive vice president of football operations

Awards and highlights
- As coach: 2× Super Bowl champion (XXXII, XXXIII)
- Executive profile at Pro Football Reference

Rick Smith (born September 3, 1969) is an American professional football executive. He served as the general manager of the Houston Texans of the National Football League (NFL) from 2006 to 2017. Smith also served as the team's executive vice president of football operations from 2012 to 2017.

Smith began his executive career with the Denver Broncos in 2000 and served as their director of pro personnel for six seasons.

== Early life ==
Smith played for the Purdue Boilermakers as a strong safety from 1988 to 1991. He graduated from that institution, where he served as a coach. After this stint, he coached for a month at Texas Christian University before going to the NFL.

== Executive career ==
=== Denver Broncos ===
In 1996, Smith was hired by the Denver Broncos as their assistant defensive backs coach. In 2000, Smith transitioned to the Broncos' personnel department and became their director of pro personnel.

=== Houston Texans ===
On June 5, 2006, Smith was named the general manager of the Houston Texans, replacing Charley Casserly. Named by Texans' owner, Bob McNair, Smith's appointment made him the youngest general manager in the NFL at the time at age 36. According to the Texans website, Smith was responsible for all aspects of football operations, salary cap management and budgeting. In 2012, Smith was given an additional role as the Texans' executive vice president of football operations and Smith oversaw all football-related operations and the player acquisition process as their executive vice president of football operations and general manager. In 2016, he was given a contract extension through 2020.

On December 31, 2017, Smith announced that he was taking a leave of absence to be with his wife, who was dealing with breast cancer. On January 1, 2018, it was also reported that he would be gone for a year and that the Texans would hire a new general manager to take his place, which ultimately happened when the Texans' hired Brian Gaine to replace Smith as their general manager on January 13, 2018. Smith retained his position as the Texans' executive vice president of football operations. However, Smith was not listed on the Houston Texans front office roster in 2018 or 2019 and through longtime Texans' beat writer John McClain the Houston Chronicle reported multiple times that Smith would not be returning to the Texans in any capacity in 2019.

== Personal life ==
Smith and his wife, Tiffany, were married in 2002 and have three children together. On January 31, 2019, Tiffany died due to breast cancer.

Smith is an executive board member of Pro-Vision Academy, a charter school and non-profit organization in Houston that provides educational services to children.
