= Houston Texans all-time roster =

726 players have appeared in at least one regular season or postseason game in the National Football League (NFL) for the Houston Texans since 2002. This list is accurate through the end of the 2025 NFL season.

== A ==
- Oday Aboushi
- Jeff Adams
- Jerell Adams
- Mike Adams
- Tyrell Adams
- Jahleel Addae
- Mario Addison
- Xavier Adibi
- Cam Akers
- Jordan Akins
- Mister Alexander
- Roc Alexander
- James Allen
- Jason Allen
- Jeff Allen
- Kyle Allen
- Azeez Al-Shaair
- Auzoyah Alufohai
- Danny Amendola
- Matt Ammendola
- Adrian Amos
- Charlie Anderson
- David Anderson
- Jason Anderson
- Mark Anderson
- Stephen Anderson
- Will Anderson Jr.
- Jake Andrews
- Bryan Anger
- Jason Ankrah
- Cornell Armstrong
- Derick Armstrong
- Damon Arnette
- Grayland Arnold
- Josh Aubrey
- Antony Auclair
- Alex Austin
- Thomas Austin
- Denico Autry

== B ==
- Jason Babin
- Johnson Bademosi
- Alan Ball
- Lonnie Ballentine
- Johnthan Banks
- Tony Banks
- Dominique Barber
- Shawn Barber
- Derek Barnett
- Connor Barwin
- Brenden Bates
- Jarrod Baxter
- Evan Baylis
- Andrew Beck
- Brad Bedell
- Jason Bell
- Eno Benjamin
- Fred Bennett
- Kevin Bentley
- Beau Benzschawel
- Tony Bergstrom
- Braxton Berrios
- Avion Black
- Jordan Black
- Ross Blacklock
- Angelo Blackson
- Alfred Blue
- Briean Boddy-Calhoun
- Thomas Booker
- Mike Boone
- Michael Boulware
- A. J. Bouye
- Kris Boyd
- Corey Bradford
- Bryan Braman
- Austin Brinkman
- Mike Brisiel
- Justin Britt
- Nick Broeker
- Brandon Brooks
- British Brooks
- Terrence Brooks
- Andrew Brown
- C. C. Brown
- Chris Brown
- Duane Brown
- Eric Brown
- Kris Brown
- Milford Brown
- Noah Brown
- Pharaoh Brown
- Ronnie Brown
- Trent Brown
- Keith Browner Jr.
- Mark Bruener
- Harrison Bryant
- Myles Bryant
- Phillip Buchanon
- Calen Bullock
- Randy Bullock
- Max Bullough
- Tim Bulman
- Rex Burkhead
- Marcus Burley
- Curry Burns
- Deante Burton
- John Busing
- Rashad Butler
- Solomon Byrd
- Jake Byrne

== C ==
- Antoine Caldwell
- Jalen Camp
- Ibraheim Campbell
- Khary Campbell
- A. J. Cann
- Marcus Cannon
- Roc Carmichael
- David Carr
- Travis Carroll
- Ajani Carter
- Chris Carter
- DeAndre Carter
- Ron'Dell Carter
- James Casey
- Blake Cashman
- Frank Chamberlin
- Anthony Chesley
- Geron Christian
- Nick Chubb
- Tyson Clabo
- Chris Clark
- Damone Clark
- Danny Clark
- Chunky Clements
- Charlie Clemons
- Jadeveon Clowney
- Tyler Clutts
- Sammie Coates
- Randall Cobb
- Earl Cochran
- Shaun Cody
- Dylan Cole
- Marcus Coleman
- Kevis Coley
- Cameron Collins
- Maliek Collins
- Nico Collins
- Aaron Colvin
- Greg Comella
- Chris Conley
- Gareon Conley
- Jameel Cook
- Brandin Cooks
- Isaiah Coulter
- Keke Coutee
- Christian Covington
- Curome Cox
- Xavier Crawford
- Jared Crick
- Marcus Cromartie
- Keion Crossen
- Zach Cunningham
- Brian Cushing

== D ==
- Lional Dalton
- Trevor Daniel
- B. J. Daniels
- Owen Daniels
- Julién Davenport
- Marlon Davidson
- André Davis
- Davion Davis
- Khalil Davis
- JaJuan Dawson
- Ron Dayne
- Treston Decoud
- Austin Deculus
- Michael Deiter
- Jake Delhomme
- Tank Dell
- Jerry DeLoach
- Quintin Demps
- Will Demps
- Anthony Denham
- Ryan Denney
- Pat Dennis
- Akeem Dent
- Dorin Dickerson
- Stefon Diggs
- Zac Diles
- K. J. Dillon
- Tim Dobbins
- Michael Dogbe
- Phillip Dorsett
- Char-ron Dorsey
- Joel Dreessen
- Jeff Driskel
- Kurtis Drummond
- Brandon Dunn
- Michael Dwumfour

== E ==
- Glenn Earl
- Dominik Eberle
- Adimchinobe Echemandu
- Mario Edwards Jr.
- Dieter Eiselen
- Duke Ejiofor
- Andre Ellington
- Bruce Ellington
- Kyle Emanuel
- Aireontae Ersery
- Tyler Ervin
- Troy Evans

== F ==
- DeMarcus Faggins
- Kaʻimi Fairbairn
- George Fant
- Folorunso Fatukasi
- Darren Fells
- Nick Ferguson
- C. J. Fiedorowicz
- Mark Fields
- Blake Fisher
- Ryan Fitzpatrick
- Mike Flanagan
- Jamar Fletcher
- Erik Flowers
- Steve Foley
- D'Onta Foreman
- Jay Foreman
- Justin Forsett
- Arian Foster
- Leki Fotu
- Jacobi Francis
- Royce Freeman
- Kyle Fuller
- Will Fuller
- Zach Fulton

== G ==
- Samkon Gado
- Jabar Gaffney
- Phillip Gaines
- Andrew Gardner
- C. J. Gardner-Johnson
- Kevin Garrett
- Breno Giacomini
- Marcus Gilchrist
- Cullen Gillaspia
- Tashaun Gipson
- Aaron Glenn
- Tavares Gooden
- DeMingo Graham
- Garrett Graham
- Ray Graham
- Shayne Graham
- Ahman Green
- Kendrick Green
- Kenyon Green
- Rasheem Green
- T. J. Green
- Jonathan Greenard
- Isaiah Greenhouse
- Morlon Greenwood
- Ryan Griffin
- Shaquill Griffin
- Jonathan Grimes
- Rex Grossman
- Kamu Grugier-Hill

== H ==
- Troy Hairston
- Andre Hal
- Nate Hall
- P. J. Hall
- Cobi Hamilton
- Chad Hansen
- Jake Hansen
- Vernon Hargreaves
- Atnaf Harris
- Brandon Harris
- Christian Harris
- Clark Harris
- Demone Harris
- Ryan Harris
- Brandon Harrison
- Brett Hartmann
- Joel Heath
- Charlie Heck
- Ben Heeney
- Taylor Heinicke
- Seantrel Henderson
- Jimmy Herndon
- Neville Hewitt
- Jayden Higgins
- Anthony Hill
- Brandon Hill
- Charles Hill
- Jamal Hill
- Dontrell Hilliard
- Kurt Hinish
- Drew Hodgdon
- Trindon Holliday
- Tony Hollings
- Ka'dar Hollman
- Jabari Holloway
- DeAndre Hopkins
- Dylan Horton
- Lamarr Houston
- DeAndre Houston-Carson
- O. J. Howard
- Tytus Howard
- Buddy Howell
- Brian Hoyer
- Jerry Hughes
- Akeem Hunt
- Danielle Hunter
- Von Hutchins
- Xavier Hutchinson
- Alijah Huzzie
- Carlos Hyde
- Kerry Hyder

== I ==
- Ed Ingram
- Ja'Marcus Ingram
- Mark Ingram II
- Junior Ioane

== J ==
- Kareem Jackson
- Natrell Jamerson
- Bradie James
- Charles James
- Tim Jamison
- Lestar Jean
- Willie Jefferson
- Darnell Jenkins
- Jelani Jenkins
- Jordan Jenkins
- Andre Johnson
- Bryant Johnson
- Damaris Johnson
- David Johnson
- Dennis Johnson
- Derrick Johnson
- Diontae Johnson
- Duke Johnson
- Jakob Johnson
- Jaleel Johnson
- Johnny Johnson III
- Kevin Johnson
- Lonnie Johnson Jr.
- Roderick Johnson
- Thomas Johnson
- Travis Johnson
- Tyler Johnson
- Tyron Johnson
- Cameron Johnston
- Andy Jones
- Ben Jones
- Don Jones
- Donnie Jones
- Greg Jones
- Jacoby Jones
- Josh Jones
- Naquan Jones
- Taiwan Jones
- Bennie Joppru
- Brevin Jordan
- Jawhar Jordan
- Johnathan Joseph

== K ==
- Peter Kalambayi
- N. D. Kalu
- Ufomba Kamalu
- Deji Karim
- Dalton Keene
- Case Keenum
- Stanford Keglar
- Senio Kelemete
- Rashod Kent
- Shiloh Keo
- William Kershaw
- Josh Keyes
- Cedric Killings
- Desmond King
- Jarrett Kingston
- Christian Kirk
- Christian Kirksey

== L ==
- Jason Lamar
- Kendall Lamm
- Kendall Langford
- Kamari Lassiter
- Vonta Leach
- Shane Lechler
- Matt Leinart
- Damione Lewis
- Derrick Lewis
- Jermaine Lewis
- Kendrick Lewis
- LaTroy Lewis
- Phillip Lindsay
- Cory Littleton
- Corey Liuget
- Roy Lopez
- Jammal Lord
- Wali Lundy

== M ==
- Elbert Mack
- Stacey Mack
- Anthony Maddox
- Jeff Maehl
- Ryan Malleck
- Ryan Mallett
- Alfred Malone
- Greg Mancz
- Danieal Manning
- Roy Manning
- Woody Marks
- Jacob Martin
- Keshawn Martin
- Nick Martin
- Steve Martin
- Terrance Martin
- Glenn Martinez
- Derrick Mason
- Shaq Mason
- Tyrann Mathieu
- Jerome Mathis
- Joe Mays
- Brice McCain
- A. J. McCarron
- Jimmy McClain
- Terrell McClain
- Dexter McCleon
- Stanley McClover
- Justin McCray
- Marlon McCree
- K. C. McDermott
- Sean McDermott
- Chris McKenzie
- Benardrick McKinney
- Steve McKinney
- Sherrick McManis
- Whitney Mercilus
- Kaevon Merriweather
- John Metchie III
- Anthony Miller
- Billy Miller
- Braxton Miller
- Lamar Miller
- Davis Mills
- Jalen Mills
- Barkevious Mingo
- Earl Mitchell
- Keith Mitchell
- Steven Mitchell
- Terrance Mitchell
- Joe Mixon
- Ryan Moats
- Mike Mohamed
- Antwaun Molden
- Quincy Monk
- A. J. Moore
- Chris Moore
- Corey Moore
- Rahim Moore
- Jimmy Moreland
- Vernand Morency
- Donovan Morgan
- Darryl Morris
- Jimmy Morrissey
- J. J. Moses
- Eric Moulds
- Keith Mumphery
- Frank Murphy
- Matt Murphy
- Eric Murray
- Chris Myers

== N ==
- Jesse Nading
- Haggai Ndubuisi
- Robert Nelson
- Steven Nelson
- Derek Newton
- Hardy Nickerson Jr.
- David Nixon
- Jaylin Noel
- Troy Nolan
- Moran Norris
- Nick Novak

== O ==
- Chris Ogbonnaya
- Dare Ogunbowale
- Adewale Ogunleye
- Frank Okam
- Ogbo Okoronkwo
- Amobi Okoye
- Jeff Okudah
- Charles Omenihu
- Dan Orlovsky
- Shantee Orr
- Brock Osweiler
- Chad Overhauser
- Jonathan Owens

== P ==
- Jeoffrey Pagan
- Jarrett Patterson
- Karl Paymah
- Seth Payne
- Antwan Peek
- Denzel Perryman
- Brian Peters
- Del'Shawn Phillips
- Scottie Phillips
- Ryan Pickett
- Dameon Pierce
- Kevin Pierre-Louis
- Jalen Pitre
- Bryan Pittman
- Chester Pitts
- Eddie Pleasant
- Chris Polk
- DaShon Polk
- Bernard Pollard
- DeVier Posey
- Jeff Posey
- Jerrell Powe
- Gimel President
- Jay Prosch
- C. J. Prosise
- MyCole Pruitt
- Jeb Putzier

== Q ==
- David Quessenberry
- Paul Quessenberry
- Scott Quessenberry
- Glover Quin
- Teagan Quitoriano
- Brent Qvale

== R ==
- Neil Rackers
- Dave Ragone
- Greg Randall
- Martinas Rankin
- Sheldon Rankins
- D. J. Reader
- Will Redmond
- Brooks Reed
- Ed Reed
- Jaylen Reed
- Jacques Reeves
- Jalen Reeves-Maybin
- John Reid
- Justin Reid
- Denzel Rice
- Hassan Ridgeway
- Victor Riley
- Derek Rivers
- Marcellus Rivers
- Andre Roberts
- Cam Robinson
- DelJuan Robinson
- Dunta Robinson
- Bradley Roby
- Amari Rodgers
- Justin Rogers (cornerback)
- Jumal Rolle
- Sage Rosenfels
- D'Angelo Ross
- Stanford Routt
- Brian Russell
- Rod Rutledge
- Barrett Ruud
- DeMeco Ryans

== S ==
- Ephraim Salaam
- Jaylen Samuels
- Lewis Sanders
- Myjai Sanders
- Cecil Sapp
- Ricky Sapp
- Eric Saubert
- Tom Savage
- Brennan Scarlett
- Max Scharping
- Ryan Schau
- Matt Schaub
- Mason Schreck
- Dalton Schultz
- Guss Scott
- Juice Scruggs
- Corey Sears
- Tim Settle
- Al-Hajj Shabazz
- David Sharpe
- Jamie Sharper
- Darryl Sharpton
- Edell Shepherd
- Malcolm Sheppard
- Cecil Shorts
- Jason Simmons
- John Simon
- Steven Sims
- Devin Singletary
- Dan Skipper
- Chad Slade
- Steve Slaton
- Jeremy Slechta
- Joey Slye
- Brad Smelley
- Antonio Smith
- Chris Smith
- D. J. Smith
- Irv Smith Jr.
- Jaylin Smith
- Robaire Smith
- Tremon Smith
- Vyncint Smith
- Wade Smith
- Sidy Sow
- Chad Spann
- Armegis Spearman
- Marcus Spears
- Ameer Speed
- E. J. Speed
- Charles Spencer
- Cameron Spikes
- Taylor Stallworth
- Chad Stanley
- Ed Stansbury
- Jawanza Starling
- Kendrick Starling
- Jordan Steckler
- Matt Stevens
- M. J. Stewart
- Devon Still
- Kenny Stills
- Derek Stingley Jr.
- Michael Stone
- Cade Stover
- Connor Strachan
- Jaelen Strong
- C. J. Stroud
- Kasey Studdard
- Xavier Suʻa-Filo
- Phillip Supernaw
- D. J. Swearinger

== T ==
- Jeff Tarpinian
- Teair Tart
- Ben Tate
- Chris Taylor
- Darrell Taylor
- J. J. Taylor
- Lane Taylor
- Tyrod Taylor
- Vincent Taylor
- Demaryius Thomas
- Joe Thomas
- Jordan Thomas
- Michael Thomas
- Tavierre Thomas
- Zachary Thomas
- Carlos Thompson
- Chaun Thompson
- Chris Thompson
- Jordan Todman
- Tommy Togiai
- Laken Tomlinson
- Cole Toner
- Henry To'oTo'o
- Derrick Townsel
- Tommy Townsend
- Justin Tuggle
- Laremy Tunsil
- Matt Turk
- Ezekiel Turner
- Mike Tyson

== V ==
- Eddie Vanderdoes
- Darrick Vaughn
- Jordan Veasy
- Lawrence Vickers
- Josh Victorian

== W ==
- Todd Wade
- Darius Walker
- DeMarcus Walker
- Gary Walker
- Josh Walker
- Ramon Walker
- Jamar Wall
- K'Von Wallace
- Garret Wallow
- Kevin Walter
- Seth Wand
- Derrick Ward
- Jimmie Ward
- Kahale Warring
- Nate Washington
- Todd Washington
- Carlos Watkins
- Deshaun Watson
- Josh Watson
- Justin Watson
- J. J. Watt
- Jared Wayne
- Fred Weary
- Anthony Weaver
- Rashad Weaver
- Joe Webb
- Kayvon Webster
- Brandon Weeden
- Jon Weeks
- Jonathan Wells
- Chris White
- Cody White
- DeAndrew White
- Devin White
- Zach Wiegert
- Vince Wilfork
- Domanick Williams
- Harry Williams
- Kevin Williams
- Marcus Williams
- Mario Williams
- Torri Williams
- Wendall Williams
- Xavier Williams
- Eric Wilson
- Eugene Wilson
- Eric Winston
- Kailee Wong
- Cierre Wood
- Jackson Woodard
- Robert Woods
- Chandler Worthy
- Kenny Wright
- Matthew Wright
- Shareece Wright
- Dexter Wynn

== Y ==
- T. J. Yates
- Russ Yeast
- Isaac Yiadom
- Ryan Young

== Z ==
- Ty Zentner
- Jeff Zgonina
