= 2002 Houston Texans season =

Inaugural season for the Texans

- Texans inaugural season logo
- Owner: Bob McNair
- General manager: Charley Casserly
- Head coach: Dom Capers
- Home stadium: Reliant Stadium

Results
- Record: 4–12
- Division place: 4th AFC South
- Playoffs: Did not qualify
- Pro Bowlers: 2: DE Gary Walker; CB Aaron Glenn

The 2002 season was the Houston Texans' debut season in the National Football League and the first NFL season for the city of Houston since the Oilers moved to Tennessee in 1997 and became the Titans 2 years later in 1999. Their coaching staff was headed by Dom Capers, who previously coached the expansion Carolina Panthers when they debuted in 1995. The divisional realignment also placed the Texans and Titans in the same division.

The Texans won their inaugural regular season game against the Dallas Cowboys 19–10 on Sunday Night Football. The Texans finished their debut season with a 4–12 record.

Due to being an expansion franchise, the Texans were given the first overall pick in the 2002 NFL draft. Houston used the selection on Fresno State quarterback David Carr. Carr finished the season with 2,592 passing yards, setting the franchise record for most passing yards by a rookie in a single season. Carr's record would not be broken until 2021, when Davis Mills finished that season with 2,664 passing yards (a number since surpassed by C. J. Stroud's 4,108 in 2023).

== NFL returns to Houston ==
In June 1997, Bob McNair and Chuck Watson's plans for a National Hockey League expansion team fell apart due to the lack of an arena in the Houston area. Afterward, the Houston Oilers moved to Nashville to become the Tennessee Titans. The discussion eventually began to create a new NFL expansion team, with the 31st being awarded to the reformed Cleveland Browns. Houston and Los Angeles were the two finalists, and on October 6, 1999, the league's owners voted unanimously to award Houston the 32nd franchise. In 2000, the new team, tentatively known as "Houston NFL 2002", decided on five potential team names: Apollos, Bobcats, Stallions, Texans and Wildcatters. This shortlist was eventually reduced to Apollos, Stallions and Texans. On September 6, the team name was officially revealed as the Houston Texans.

On January 19, 2000, the team hired former Washington Redskins general manager Charley Casserly to serve in the same position. In the search for a head coach, Miami coach Butch Davis was involved in discussions with McNair, but elected to stay with the university. In January 2001, the Texans hired Jacksonville Jaguars defensive coordinator Dom Capers as head coach; Capers had previously worked with the expansion Carolina Panthers as their HC. On January 20, Indianapolis Colts defensive coordinator Vic Fangio joined the staff in the same role, followed by former Cleveland Browns head coach Chris Palmer as offensive coordinator on February 3, 2001.

== Offseason ==
=== Free agency ===
On November 5, 2001, the Texans held workouts for defensive backs at the Reliant Astrodome. On December 29, the team signed ten players: running back Michael Basnight, safety Leomont Evans, tackles Robert Hicks and Jerry Wisne, defensive tackle Jason Nikolao, quarterback Mike Quinn, fullback Matt Snider, cornerback Jason Suttle, linebacker Casey Tisdale and safety Kevin Williams. On March 6, 2002, Colts offensive lineman Steve McKinney became the first unrestricted free agent to be signed by the Texans.

=== Expansion draft ===
To fill the Texans roster, the NFL held an expansion draft on February 18. The team was permitted to select 42 players from the other 31 teams, each of which allowed five players to be drafted. Houston were required to select 30 players or spend 38 percent ($27.24 million) of the $71.7 million salary cap.

The first player that the Texans selected was Jacksonville Jaguars offensive tackle Tony Boselli; however, the five-time Pro Bowler had been suffering from shoulder injuries during the 2001 season and never played a snap for the Texans. Houston also selected 18 more players.

On February 26, quarterback Danny Wuerffel was traded to the Washington Redskins for defensive tackle Jerry DeLoach. The Texans had intended to draft DeLoach, but the Redskins replaced him with Matt Campbell.

Round	Player	Position	Team
1	Tony Boselli^	Offensive tackle	Jacksonville Jaguars
2	Ryan Young^	Offensive tackle	New York Jets
3	Aaron Glenn^	Cornerback	New York Jets
4	Gary Walker^	Defensive tackle	Jacksonville Jaguars
5	Jamie Sharper^	Linebacker	Baltimore Ravens
6	Jermaine Lewis^	Wide receiver	Baltimore Ravens
7	Marcus Coleman^	Defensive back	New York Jets
8	Seth Payne^	Defensive tackle	Jacksonville Jaguars
9	Matt Campbell	Offensive guard	Washington Redskins
10	Matt Stevens^	Safety	New England Patriots
11	Jeremy McKinney^	Offensive guard	Cleveland Browns
12	Ryan Schau^	Offensive guard	Philadelphia Eagles
13	Charlie Rogers	Running back	Seattle Seahawks
14	Sean McDermott^	Tight end	Tampa Bay Buccaneers
15	Jabari Issa^	Defensive end	Arizona Cardinals
16	Avion Black^	Wide receiver	Buffalo Bills
17	Danny Wuerffel	Quarterback	Chicago Bears
18	Brian Allen	Linebacker	St. Louis Rams
19	Johnny Huggins	Tight end	Dallas Cowboys

^ Made roster.

=== NFL draft ===
2002 Houston Texans draft
Round	Pick	Player	Position	College	Notes
1	1	David Carr	QB	Fresno State	
2	33	Jabar Gaffney	WR	Florida	
2	50	Chester Pitts	OT	San Diego State	Extra selection
3	66	Fred Weary	OG	Tennessee	
3	83	Charles Hill	DT	Maryland	Extra selection
4	99	Jonathan Wells	RB	Ohio State	
5	136	Jarrod Baxter	FB	New Mexico	
5	153	Ramon Walker	S	Pittsburgh	Extra selection
6	173	Demarcus Faggins	CB	Kansas State	
6	190	Howard Green	DT	LSU	Extra selection
7	229	Greg White	DE	Minnesota	Extra selection
7	261	Ahmad Miller	DT	UNLV	Extra selection
Made roster

=== Undrafted free agents ===
2002 undrafted free agents of note
Player	Position	College
Larry Austin	Cornerback	Virginia Tech
Tony Donald	Linebacker	Western Colorado
Delvon Flowers	Running back	Arizona State
Kenny Harney	Linebacker	South Carolina
Atnaf Harris	Wide receiver	Cal State Northridge
Jelani Hawkins	Tackle	San Jose State
Rashod Kent	Tight end	Rutgers
Joey Knapp	Tight end	UTEP
Robert Mackey	Linebacker	Winston-Salem State
John Miller	Tackle	Duke
Jimmy McClain	Linebacker	Troy State
John Minardi	Wide receiver	Colorado
Eric Parker	Wide receiver	Tennessee
Josh Phillips	Safety	Yale
Ed Stansbury	Running back	UCLA
Aaron Thompson	Linebacker	Maryland
Terrell Washington	Linebacker	Illinois

== Staff ==
2002 Houston Texans staff
Front office: Founder, chairman and chief executive officer – Bob McNair; Senior vice president and general manager – Charley Casserly; Associate director of pro scouting – Bobby Grier; Associate director of pro scouting – Miller McCalmon; Coordinator of college scouting – Mike Maccagnan; Head coaches: Head coach – Dom Capers; Offensive coaches: Offensive coordinator – Chris Palmer; Running backs – Chick Harris; Wide receivers – Kippy Brown; Tight ends – Greg Roman; Offensive line – Tony Marciano; Assistant offensive line – Steve Marshall	Defensive coaches: Defensive coordinator – Vic Fangio; Defensive line – Todd Grantham; Linebackers – Reggie Herring; Defensive backs (secondary) – Jon Hoke; Assistant defensive backs (secondary) – Brian Stewart; Defensive quality control – Jedd Fisch; Special teams coaches: Special teams – Joe Marciano; Special teams assistant – Eric Sutulovich; Strength and conditioning: Strength and conditioning – Dan Riley; Assistant strength and conditioning – Ray Wright

== Roster ==
2002 Houston Texans roster
Quarterbacks (QB): 12 Tony Banks; 8 David Carr; 11 Mike Quinn; Running backs (RB): 20 James Allen; 47 Jarrod Baxter FB; 44 Moran Norris FB; 32 Jonathan Wells; Wide receivers (WR): 88 Avion Black; 85 Corey Bradford; 87 JaJuan Dawson; 86 Jabar Gaffney; 81 Atnaf Harris; 84 Jermaine Lewis; 83 Frank Murphy; Tight ends (TE): 89 Jabari Holloway; 82 Billy Miller	Offensive linemen (OL): 67 Milford Brown G; 72 Barry Hall G/T; 75 Jimmy Herndon T; 76 Steve McKinney C; 69 Chester Pitts T; 78 Cameron Spikes G; 60 Tarlos Thomas T; 61 Fred Weary G; 74 Ryan Young T; Defensive linemen (DL): 95 Jerry DeLoach DE; 93 Erik Flowers DE; 97 Howard Green NT; 94 Charles Hill NT; 91 Seth Payne NT; 92 Corey Sears DE; 96 Gary Walker DE; 90 Shawn Worthen NT	Linebackers (LB): 54 Troy Evans OLB; 56 Jay Foreman ILB; 51 Jimmy McClain ILB; 59 Keith Mitchell OLB; 98 Jeff Posey OLB; 55 Jamie Sharper ILB; 52 Kailee Wong OLB; Defensive backs (DB): 33 Jason Bell CB; 24 Eric Brown SS; 42 Marcus Coleman CB; 38 DeMarcus Faggins CB; 31 Aaron Glenn CB; 34 Kyries Hebert SS; 30 Jason Simmons CB/S; 26 Matt Stevens FS; 23 Kevin Williams FS; 43 Kenny Wright CB; Special teams (ST): 3 Kris Brown K; 80 Sean McDermott LS; 7 Chad Stanley P	Practice squad: -- McAllister Collins C; -- Jelani Hawkins T; -- Rashod Kent TE; Reserve: 71 Tony Boselli T (IR); 28 Pat Dennis CB (IR); 35 Leomont Evans S (IR); 70 DeMingo Graham G (Susp.); -- Trevor Insley WR (IR); 18 Dwaune Jones WR (IR); 58 Jason Lamar LB (IR); 62 Chris Lorenti C (IR); -- Mike Newell C (IR); 83 Rod Rutledge TE (IR); 65 Ryan Schau G (IR); 41 Ramon Walker S (IR); Rookies in italics 53 active, 12 reserve, 3 practice squad

== Preseason ==
Week	Date	Opponent	Result	Record	Venue	Recap
HOF	August 5	vs. New York Giants	L 17–34	0–1	Fawcett Stadium (Canton)	Recap
1	August 10	at New Orleans Saints	W 13–10	1–1	Louisiana Superdome	Recap
2	August 17	at Kansas City Chiefs	L 9–19	1–2	Arrowhead Stadium	Recap
3	August 24	Miami Dolphins	L 3–24	1–3	Reliant Stadium	Recap
4	August 30	Tampa Bay Buccaneers	L 13–17	1–4	Reliant Stadium	Recap

== Regular season ==
=== Schedule ===
Week	Date	Opponent	Result	Record	Venue	Recap
1	September 8	Dallas Cowboys	**W** 19–10	1–0	Reliant Stadium	Recap
2	September 15	at San Diego Chargers	**L** 3–24	1–1	Qualcomm Stadium	Recap
3	September 22	**Indianapolis Colts**	**L** 3–23	1–2	Reliant Stadium	Recap
4	September 29	at Philadelphia Eagles	**L** 17–35	1–3	Veterans Stadium	Recap
5	Bye					
6	October 13	Buffalo Bills	**L** 24–31	1–4	Reliant Stadium	Recap
7	October 20	at Cleveland Browns	**L** 17–34	1–5	Cleveland Browns Stadium	Recap
8	October 27	at **Jacksonville Jaguars**	**W** 21–19	2–5	Alltel Stadium	Recap
9	November 3	Cincinnati Bengals	**L** 3–38	2–6	Reliant Stadium	Recap
10	November 10	at **Tennessee Titans**	**L** 10–17	2–7	The Coliseum	Recap
11	November 17	**Jacksonville Jaguars**	**L** 21–24	2–8	Reliant Stadium	Recap
12	November 24	New York Giants	**W** 16–14	3–8	Reliant Stadium	Recap
13	December 1	at **Indianapolis Colts**	**L** 3–19	3–9	RCA Dome	Recap
14	December 8	at Pittsburgh Steelers	**W** 24–6	4–9	Heinz Field	Recap
15	December 15	Baltimore Ravens	**L** 19–23	4–10	Reliant Stadium	Recap
16	December 22	at Washington Redskins	**L** 10–26	4–11	FedExField	Recap
17	December 29	**Tennessee Titans**	**L** 3–13	4–12	Reliant Stadium	Recap

Note: Intra-division opponents are in bold text.

=== Game summaries ===
==== Week 1: vs. Dallas Cowboys ====
Week 1: Dallas Cowboys at Houston Texans – Game summary

Quarter	1	2	3	4	Total
Cowboys	0	3	7	0	**10**
**Texans**	7	3	0	9	**19**

at Reliant Stadium, Houston, Texas

- Date: September 8, 2002
- Game time: 7:30 p.m. CST
- Game weather: Played indoors (retractable roof closed)
- Game attendance: 69,604
- Referee: Bill Carollo
- TV announcers (ESPN): Mike Patrick, Joe Theismann, Paul Maguire and Suzy Kolber
- Recap

Game information

**First quarter**

- HOU – Billy Miller 19-yard pass from David Carr (Kris Brown kick), 14:43. Texans 7–0. **Drive: 3 plays, 64 yards, 0:13.**

**Second quarter**

- HOU – Kris Brown 42-yard field goal, 13:22. Texans 10–0. **Drive: 4 plays, 2 yards.**
- DAL – Billy Cundiff 33-yard field goal, 1:05. Texans 10–3. **Drive: 6 plays, 48 yards, 0:32.**

**Third quarter**

- DAL – Michael Wiley 46-yard run (Billy Cundiff kick), 7:13. Tied 10–10. **Drive: 4 plays, 84 yards.**

**Fourth quarter**

- HOU – Corey Bradford 65-yard pass from David Carr (Kris Brown kick), 13:15. Texans 17–10. **Drive: 3 plays, 74 yards, 0:25.**
- HOU – Quincy Carter sacked in the end zone for a safety, 2:47. Texans 19–10.

**Top passers**

- DAL – Quincy Carter – 13/30, 130 yards, INT
- HOU – David Carr – 10/22, 145 yards, 2 TD, INT

**Top rushers**

- DAL – Emmitt Smith – 17 rushes, 67 yards
- HOU – James Allen – 19 rushes, 56 yards

**Top receivers**

- DAL – Joey Galloway – 6 receptions, 69 yards
- HOU – Corey Bradford – 4 receptions, 99 yards, TD

==== Week 2: at San Diego Chargers ====
Week 2: Houston Texans (1–0) at San Diego Chargers (1–0) – Game summary

Quarter	1	2	3	4	Total
Texans	0	3	0	0	**3**
**Chargers**	14	3	0	7	**24**

at Qualcomm Stadium, San Diego, California

- Date: September 15, 2002
- Game time: 3:15 p.m. CST
- Game weather: 74° (Sunny)
- Game attendance: 56,098
- Referee: Mike Carey
- TV announcers (CBS): Craig Bolerjack, Craig James and Scott Kaplan
- Box score, Game Book

Game information

**First quarter**

- SD – Curtis Conway 35-yard pass from Drew Brees (Steve Christie kick), 11:55. Chargers 7–0. **Drive: 10 plays, 78 yards, 3:37.**
- SD – Curtis Conway 3-yard run (Steve Christie kick), 2:52. Chargers 14–0. **Drive: 3 plays, 6 yards, 0:33.**

**Second quarter**

- HOU – Kris Brown 45-yard field goal, 9:31. Chargers 14–3. **Drive: 4 plays, 8 yards, 1:45.**
- SD – Steve Christie 36-yard field goal, 0:07. Chargers 17–3. **Drive: 6 plays, 37 yards, 0:28.**

**Third quarter**

- No scoring plays.

**Fourth quarter**

- SD – Raylee Johnson fumble recovery in the end zone (Steve Christie kick), 11:49. Chargers 24–3.

**Top passers**

- HOU – David Carr – 6/25, 87 yards, 2 INT
- SD – Drew Brees – 15/28, 163 yards, TD, INT

**Top rushers**

- HOU – James Allen – 13 rushes, 51 yards
- SD – LaDainian Tomlinson – 27 rushes, 84 yards

**Top receivers**

- HOU – Jabar Gaffney – 2 receptions, 37 yards
- SD – Curtis Conway – 5 receptions, 113 yards, TD

==== Week 3: vs. Indianapolis Colts ====
Week 3: Indianapolis Colts at Houston Texans – Game summary

Quarter	1	2	3	4	Total
**Colts**	7	6	0	10	**23**
Texans	0	0	3	0	**3**

at Reliant Stadium, Houston, Texas

- Date: September 22, 2002
- Game time: 12:00 p.m. CST
- Game weather: Roof open 81° Sunny
- Game attendance: 69,204
- Referee: Tony Corrente
- TV announcers (CBS): Gus Johnson and Brent Jones
- Recap

Game information

**First quarter**

- IND – Qadry Ismail 42-yard pass from Peyton Manning (Mike Vanderjagt kick), 2:40. Colts 7–0. **Drive: 7 plays, 80 yards, 3:25.**

**Second quarter**

- IND – Mike Vanderjagt 26-yard field goal, 12:59. Colts 10–0. **Drive: 6 plays, 33 yards, 10:59.**
- IND – Mike Vanderjagt 39-yard field goal, 1:38. Colts 13–0. **Drive: 8 plays, 46 yards, 2:34.**

**Third quarter**

- HOU – Kris Brown 24-yard field goal, 4:55. Colts 13–3. **Drive: 12 plays, 55 yards, 5:22.**

**Fourth quarter**

- IND – Reggie Wayne 43-yard pass from Peyton Manning (Mike Vanderjagt kick), 4:06. Colts 20–3. **Drive: 8 plays, 69 yards, 3:30.**
- IND – Mike Vanderjagt 37-yard field goal, 1:15. Colts 23–3. **Drive: 4 plays, 3 yards, 2:03.**

**Top passers**

- IND – Peyton Manning – 21/28, 272 yards, 2 TD
- HOU – David Carr – 12/22, 99 yards, INT

**Top rushers**

- IND – Edgerrin James – 25 rushes, 88 yards
- HOU – Jonathan Wells – 14 rushes, 93 yards

**Top receivers**

- IND – Marvin Harrison – 8 receptions, 110 yards
- HOU – JaJuan Dawson – 3 receptions, 32 yards

==== Week 4: at Philadelphia Eagles ====
Week 4: Houston Texans at Philadelphia Eagles – Game summary

Quarter	1	2	3	4	Total
Texans	7	0	10	0	**17**
**Eagles**	3	17	8	7	**35**

at Veterans Stadium, Philadelphia, Pennsylvania

- Date: September 29, 2002
- Game time: 12:00 p.m. CST
- Game weather: 72° (Sunny, partly cloudy)
- Game attendance: 64,867
- Referee: Johnny Grier
- TV announcers (CBS): Don Criqui and Steve Tasker
- Recap

Game information

**First quarter**

- HOU – Corey Bradford 23-yard pass from David Carr (Kris Brown kick), 10:18. Texans 7–0. **Drive: 6 plays, 69 yards, 2:10.**
- PHI – David Akers 25-yard field goal, 3:56. Texans 7–3. **Drive: 13 plays, 72 yards, 5:23.**

**Second quarter**

- PHI – Duce Staley 1-yard run (David Akers kick), 13:31. Eagles 10–7. **Drive: 10 plays, 42 yards, 4:19.**
- PHI – Duce Staley 1-yard run (David Akers kick), 5:18. Eagles 17–7. **Drive: 8 plays, 64 yards, 4:08.**
- PHI – David Akers 41-yard field goal, 2:46. Eagles 20–7. **Drive: 4 plays, 7 yards, 0:15.**

**Third quarter**

- PHI – Brian Dawkins 57-yard pass from Brian Mitchell (McNabb pass to Lewis), 11:43. Eagles 28–7. **Drive: 8 plays, 88 yards, 3:52.**
- HOU – Corey Bradford 29-yard pass from David Carr (Kris Brown kick), 9:16. Eagles 28–14. **Drive: 5 plays, 60 yards, 2:12.**
- HOU – Kris Brown 48-yard field goal, 2:37. Eagles 28–17. **Drive: 7 plays, 24 yards, 2:33.**

**Fourth quarter**

- PHI – James Thrash 38-yard pass from Donovan McNabb (David Akers kick), 5:15. Eagles 35–17. **Drive: 4 plays, 57 yards, 0:53.**

**Top passers**

- HOU – David Carr – 16/29, 188 yards, 2 TD, 2 INT
- PHI – Donovan McNabb – 24/42, 259 yards, TD, INT

**Top rushers**

- HOU – James Allen – 14 rushes, 41 yards
- PHI – Duce Staley – 12 rushes, 33 yards, 2 TD

**Top receivers**

- HOU – Corey Bradford – 7 receptions, 97 yards, 2 TD
- PHI – Todd Pinkston – 6 receptions, 70 yards

==== Week 6: vs. Buffalo Bills ====
Week 6: Buffalo Bills (2-3) at Houston Texans (1-3) – Game summary

Quarter	1	2	3	4	Total
**Bills**	3	7	7	14	**31**
Texans	3	14	0	7	**24**

at Reliant Stadium, Houston, Texas

- Date: October 13, 2002
- Game time: 12:00 pm CST
- Game weather: None (indoor stadium)
- Game attendance: 70,120
- Referee: Ed Hochuli
- TV announcers (CBS): Don Criqui and Steve Tasker
- Recap

Game information

**First quarter**

- HOU – Kris Brown 26-yard field goal, 10:26. Texans 3–0. **Drive: 5 plays, 82 yards, 2:19.**
- BUF – Mike Hollis 33-yard field goal, 5:00. Tied 3–3. **Drive: 13 plays, 66 yards, 5:26.**

**Second quarter**

- HOU – Jabar Gaffney 26-yard pass from David Carr (Kris Brown kick), 10:31. Texans 10–3. **Drive: 9 plays, 70 yards, 4:34.**
- HOU – David Carr 17-yard run (Kris Brown kick), 5:04. Texans 17–3. **Drive: 7 plays, 63 yards, 4:04.**
- BUF – Travis Henry 1-yard run (Mike Hollis kick), 0:54. Texans 17–10. **Drive: 10 plays, 85 yards, 4:10.**

**Third quarter**

- BUF – Travis Henry 23-yard run (Mike Hollis kick), 6:32. Tied 17–17. **Drive: 11 plays, 95 yards, 5:10.**

**Fourth quarter**

- HOU – Billy Miller 5-yard pass from James Allen (Kris Brown kick), 14:10. Texans 24–17. **Drive: 2 plays, 8 yards, 0:24.**
- BUF – Eric Moulds 23-yard pass from Drew Bledsoe (Mike Hollis kick), 10:39. Tied 24–24. **Drive: 7 plays, 55 yards, 3:31.**
- BUF – Peerless Price 26-yard pass from Drew Bledsoe (Mike Hollis kick), 3:55. Bills 31–24. **Drive: 9 plays, 63 yards, 4:30.**

**Top passers**

- BUF – Drew Bledsoe – 19/33, 254 yards, 2 TD
- HOU – David Carr – 12/23, 218 yards, TD

**Top rushers**

- BUF – Travis Henry – 28 rushes, 159 yards, 2 TD
- HOU – Jonathan Wells – 12 rushes, 70 yards

**Top receivers**

- BUF – Peerless Price – 8 receptions, 121 yards, TD
- HOU – Corey Bradford – 5 receptions, 126 yards

==== Week 7: at Cleveland Browns ====
Week 7: Houston Texans at Cleveland Browns – Game summary

Quarter	1	2	3	4	Total
Texans	0	7	10	0	**17**
**Browns**	0	7	17	10	**34**

at Cleveland Browns Stadium, Cleveland, Ohio

- Date: October 20, 2002
- Game time: 3:05 p.m. CST
- Game weather: 52°
- Game attendance: 73,248
- Referee: Gerald Austin
- TV announcers (CBS): Gus Johnson and Brent Jones
- Recap

Game information

**First quarter**

- No scoring plays.

**Second quarter**

- CLE – William Green 1-yard run (Phil Dawson kick), 14:23. Browns 7–0. **Drive: 5 plays, 13 yards, 3:28.**
- HOU – Corey Bradford 37-yard pass from David Carr (Kris Brown kick), 12:41. Tied 7–7. **Drive: 4 plays, 62 yards, 0:37.**

**Third quarter**

- CLE – Phil Dawson 36-yard field goal, 10:30. Browns 10–7. **Drive: 7 plays, 45 yards, 2:20.**
- HOU – Corey Bradford 39-yard pass from Jabar Gaffney (Kris Brown kick), 9:03. Texans 14–10. **Drive: 5 plays, 70 yards, 0:37.**
- CLE – André Davis 95-yard kick return (Phil Dawson kick), 8:31. Browns 17–14.
- HOU – Kris Brown 47-yard field goal, 5:48. Tied 17–17. **Drive: 8 plays, 35 yards, 1:59.**
- CLE – Quincy Morgan 25-yard pass from Tim Couch (Phil Dawson kick), 3:22. Browns 24–17. **Drive: 6 plays, 60 yards, 2:14.**

**Fourth quarter**

- CLE – Phil Dawson 44-yard field goal, 5:46. Browns 27–17. **Drive: 9 plays, 31 yards, 3:57.**
- CLE – Jamel White 2-yard run (Phil Dawson kick), 2:00. Browns 34–17. **Drive: 2 plays, 4 yards, 0:35.**

**Top passers**

- HOU – David Carr – 22/36, 267 yards, TD
- CLE – Tim Couch – 21/31, 148 yards, TD

**Top rushers**

- HOU – James Allen – 5 rushes, 61 yards
- CLE – Jamel White – 12 rushes, 65 yards, TD

**Top receivers**

- HOU – Billy Miller – 6 receptions, 78 yards
- CLE – Quincy Morgan – 7 receptions, 81 yards, TD

==== Week 8: at Jacksonville Jaguars ====
Week 8: Houston Texans at Jacksonville Jaguars – Game summary

Quarter	1	2	3	4	Total
**Texans**	0	7	3	11	**21**
Jaguars	0	9	3	7	**19**

at Alltel Stadium, Jacksonville, Florida

- Date: October 27, 2002
- Game time: 3:15 p.m. CST
- Game attendance: 53,721
- Referee: Ron Blum
- TV announcers (CBS): Ian Eagle and Solomon Wilcots
- Recap

Game information

**First quarter**

- No scoring plays

**Second quarter**

- JAX – Jimmy Smith 25-yard pass from Mark Brunell (Tim Seder kick), 12:11. Jaguars 7–0. **Drive: 7 plays, 74 yards, 2:39.**
- HOU – Jonathan Wells 3-yard run (Kris Brown kick), 8:31. Tied 7–7. **Drive: 4 plays, 44 yards, 2:08.**
- JAX – Chad Stanley tackled in end zone, 5:15. Jaguars 9–7.

**Third quarter**

- HOU – Kris Brown 43-yard field goal, 11:55. Texans 10–9. **Drive: 6 plays, 46 yards, 3:39.**
- JAX – Tim Seder 34-yard field goal, 6:31. Jaguars 12–10. **Drive: 4 plays, 7 yards, 0:43.**

**Fourth quarter**

- HOU – Billy Miller 1-yard pass from David Carr (Carr pass to Gaffney), 18–12. **Drive: 10 plays, 80 yards, 4:12.**
- JAX – Stacey Mack 2-yard run (Tim Seder kick), 7:58. Jaguars 19–18. **Drive: 7 plays, 70 yards, 3:22.**
- HOU – Kris Brown 45-yard field goal, 2:24. Texans 21–19. **Drive: 4 plays, 50 yards, 0:28.**

**Top passers**

- HOU – David Carr – 11/18, 184 yards, TD
- JAX – Mark Brunell – 16/34, 202 yards, TD

**Top rushers**

- HOU – James Allen – 10 rushes, 40 yards
- JAX – Fred Taylor – 25 rushes, 85 yards

**Top receivers**

- HOU – Billy Miller – 3 receptions, 78 yards, TD
- JAX – Jimmy Smith – 4 receptions, 80 yards, TD

==== Week 9: vs. Cincinnati Bengals ====
Week 9: Cincinnati Bengals at Houston Texans – Game summary

Quarter	1	2	3	4	Total
**Bengals**	10	14	0	14	**38**
Texans	3	0	0	0	**3**

at Reliant Stadium, Houston, Texas

- Date: November 3, 2002
- Game time: 12:00 p.m. CST
- Game attendance: 69,827
- Referee: Larry Nemmers
- TV announcers (CBS): Don Criqui and Steve Tasker
- Recap

Game information

**First quarter**

- HOU − Kris Brown 23-yard field goal, 10:58. Texans 3–0. **Drive: 8 plays, 66 yards, 3:55.**
- CIN – Neil Rackers 25-yard field goal, 5:51. Tied 3–3. **Drive: 11 plays, 68 yards, 4:16.**
- CIN – Artrell Hawkins 102-yard interception return (Neil Rackers kick), 0:00. Bengals 10–3.

**Second quarter**

- CIN – Michael Westbrook 26-yard pass from Jon Kitna (Neil Rackers kick), 6:00. Bengals 17–3. **Drive: 10 plays, 78 yards, 5:29.**
- CIN – Peter Warrick 33-yard pass from Jon Kitna (Neil Rackers kick), 0:42. Bengals 24–3. **Drive: 7 plays, 72 yards, 0:07.**

**Third quarter**

- No scoring plays

**Fourth quarter**

- CIN – Michael Westbrook 12-yard pass from Jon Kitna (Neil Rackers kick), 11:28. Bengals 31–3. **Drive: 13 plays, 98 yards, 16:59.**
- CIN – Chad Johnson 10-yard pass from Jon Kitna (Neil Rackers kick), 6:01. Bengals 38–3. **Drive: 7 plays, 59 yards, 3:38.**

**Top passers**

- CIN – Jon Kitna – 22/27, 263 yards, 4 TD
- HOU – David Carr – 18/32, 199 yards, 2 INT

**Top rushers**

- CIN – Corey Dillon – 22 rushes, 92 yards
- HOU – Jonathan Wells – 12 rushes, 44 yards

**Top receivers**

- CIN – Peter Warrick – 7 receptions, 86 yards, TD
- HOU – Corey Bradford – 5 receptions, 53 yards

==== Week 10: at Tennessee Titans ====
Week 10: Houston Texans at Tennessee Titans – Game summary

Quarter	1	2	3	4	Total
Texans	0	3	0	7	**10**
**Titans**	7	3	7	0	**17**

at LP Field, Nashville, Tennessee

- Date: November 10, 2002
- Game time: 12:00 p.m. CST
- Game attendance: 68,804
- Referee: Bill Leavy
- TV announcers (CBS): Don Criqui and Steve Tasker
- Recap

Game information

**First quarter**

- TEN – Derrick Mason 13-yard pass from Steve McNair (Joe Nedney kick), 3:47. Titans 7–0. **Drive: 14 plays, 94 yards, 5:41.**

**Second quarter**

- TEN – Joe Nedney 24-yard field goal, 7:54. Titans 10–0. **Drive: 4 plays, 6 yards, 0:36.**
- HOU – Kris Brown 51-yard field goal, 1:11. Titans 10–3. **Drive: 12 plays, 41 yards, 5:06.**

**Third quarter**

- TEN – Shad Meier 17-yard pass from Steve McNair (Joe Nedney kick), 10:52. Titans 17–3. **Drive: 7 plays, 66 yards, 4:06.**

**Fourth quarter**

- HOU – Jarrod Baxter 10-yard pass from David Carr (Kris Brown kick), 3:10. Titans 17–10. **Drive: 10 plays, 73 yards, 1:41.**

**Top passers**

- HOU – David Carr – 19/34, 182 yards, TD, 2 INT
- TEN – Steve McNair – 10/21, 109 yards, 2 TD, 2 INT

**Top rushers**

- HOU – Jonathan Wells – 18 rushes, 41 yards
- TEN – Eddie George – 25 rushes, 86 yards

**Top receivers**

- HOU – JaJuan Dawson – 4 receptions, 75 yards
- TEN – Derrick Mason – 4 receptions, 47 yards, TD

==== Week 11: vs. Jacksonville Jaguars ====
Week 11: Jacksonville Jaguars at Houston Texans – Game summary

Quarter	1	2	3	4	Total
**Jaguars**	7	10	7	0	**24**
Texans	0	7	7	7	**21**

at Reliant Stadium, Houston, Texas

- Date: November 17, 2002
- Game time: 12:00 p.m. CST
- Game attendance: 69,711
- Referee: Dick Hantak
- TV announcers (CBS): Don Criqui and Steve Tasker
- Recap

Game information

**First quarter**

- JAX – Stacey Mack 1-yard run (Tim Seder kick), 1:19. Jaguars 7–0. **Drive: 4 plays, 2 yards, 0:45.**

**Second quarter**

- JAX – Kyle Brady 2-yard pass from Mark Brunell (Tim Seder kick), 10:20. Jaguars 14–0. **Drive: 6 plays, 96 yards, 1:44.**
- HOU – Corey Bradford 52-yard pass from David Carr (Kris Brown kick), 3:56. Jaguars 14–7. **Drive: 5 plays, 72 yards, 2:37.**
- JAX – Tim Seder 22-yard field goal, 0:00. Jaguars 17–7. **Drive: 6 plays, 26 yards, 1:55.**

**Third quarter**

- JAX – Jimmy Smith 13-yard pass from Mark Brunell (Tim Seder kick), 12:50. Jaguars 24–7. **Drive: 2 plays, 27 yards, 0:15.**
- HOU – David Carr 2-yard run (Kris Brown kick), 1:25. Jaguars 24–14. **Drive: 9 plays, 83 yards, 4:12.**

**Fourth quarter**

- HOU – David Carr 14-yard run (Kris Brown kick), 2:04. Jaguars 24–21. **Drive: 13 plays, 79 yards, 5:14.**

**Top passers**

- JAX – Mark Brunell – 15/25, 224 yards, 2 TD, INT
- HOU – David Carr – 22/30, 228 yards, TD, INT

**Top rushers**

- JAX – Fred Taylor – 13 rushes, 56 yards
- HOU – David Carr – 7 rushes, 33 yards, 2 TD

**Top receivers**

- JAX – Jimmy Smith – 6 receptions, 70 yards, TD
- HOU – Corey Bradford – 5 receptions, 73 yards, TD

==== Week 12: vs. New York Giants ====
Week 12: New York Giants at Houston Texans – Game summary

Quarter	1	2	3	4	Total
Giants	0	7	0	7	**14**
**Texans**	0	5	8	3	**16**

at Reliant Stadium, Houston, Texas

- Date: November 24, 2002
- Game time: 3:15 p.m. CST
- Game attendance: 70,054
- Referee: Terry McAulay
- TV announcers (Fox): Sam Rosen, Bill Maas and Matt Sampsell
- Recap

Game information

**First quarter**

- No scoring plays

**Second quarter**

- HOU – Kris Brown 40-yard field goal, 12:38. Texans 3–0. **Drive: 9 plays, 53 yards, 15:40.**
- NYG – Tiki Barber 2-yard run (Matt Bryant kick), 3:45. Giants 7–3. **Drive: 5 plays, 86 yards, 2:22.**
- HOU – Matt Allen tackled in end zone, 0:26. Giants 7–5.

**Third quarter**

- HOU – Jonathan Wells 1-yard run (David Carr pass to James Allen), 6:57. Texans 13–7. **Drive: 7 plays, 34 yards, 3:36.**

**Fourth quarter**

- NYG – Amani Toomer 31-yard pass from Kerry Collins (Matt Bryant kick), 13:18. Giants 14–13. **Drive: 6 plays, 61 yards, 12:02.**
- HOU – Kris Brown 50-yard field goal, 6:57. Texans 16–14. **Drive: 11 plays, 41 yards, 5:57.**

**Top passers**

- NYG – Kerry Collins – 18/41, 214 yards, TD, 2 INT
- HOU – David Carr – 10/23, 103 yards

**Top rushers**

- NYG – Tiki Barber – 20 rushes, 147 yards, TD
- HOU – Jonathan Wells – 24 rushes, 68 yards, TD

**Top receivers**

- NYG – Amani Toomer – 8 receptions, 113 yards, TD
- HOU – Billy Miller – 4 receptions, 70 yards

The Giants entered the game at 6–4 looking for an easy victory over the expansion Texans. The first quarter was scoreless with miscues from both teams. Houston received the opening kickoff, but went three-and-out, punting the ball to end the drive. On the second play of the following drive, New York running back Tiki Barber fumbled the ball at the Giants 27-yard line with the ball being recovered by Houston linebacker Jamie Sharper. On the next drive, Texans' running back James Allen fumbled the ball and it was recovered at the New York 30-yard line by linebacker Dhani Jones for the Giants. The two teams would trade punts with the first points being scored by Houston kicker Kris Brown on a 40-yard field goal in the second quarter. The Giants would respond a few drives later with Barber scoring on a 1-yard touchdown run. The game's next scoring play would come late in the second quarter. New York long snapper Bob Jones fumbled the snap with the ball being recovered by punter Matt Allen, who was tackled in his own end zone for a safety with the Texans trailing 7–5 at halftime.

Houston's first touchdown of the game came in the 3rd quarter, with a 1-yard run from Jonathan Wells. The Texans went for two, with Allen catching a pass from David Carr to put Houston up 13–7 with 6:57 left in the 3rd quarter. The Giants' following drive ended with Matt Bryant missing a 33-yard field goal. New York would score on its next possession with a 31-yard pass from Kerry Collins to receiver Amani Toomer to the Giants up 14–13 with 13:18 left in the game. Houston responded on the next drive with a 50-yard field goal to take a 16–14 lead with 6:57 left. The Giants had three drives to respond, but Collins was picked off twice on back-to-back possessions with the last play of the game being a failed Hail Mary to give the Texans a 16–14 upset victory.

To this day, this remains the last time the Texans defeated the Giants.

==== Week 13: at Indianapolis Colts ====
Week 13: Houston Texans at Indianapolis Colts – Game summary

Quarter	1	2	3	4	Total
Texans	0	0	0	3	**3**
**Colts**	10	3	0	6	**19**

at RCA Dome, Indianapolis, Indiana

- Date: December 1, 2002
- Game time: 3:05 p.m. CST
- Game attendance: 56,820
- Referee: Johnny Grier
- TV announcers (CBS): Ian Eagle and Solomon Wilcots
- Recap

Game information

**First quarter**

- IND – Mike Vanderjagt 31-yard field goal, 10:00. Colts 3–0. **Drive: 4 plays, 3 yards, 1:56.**
- IND – Marcus Pollard 16-yard pass from Peyton Manning (Mike Vanderjagt kick), 8:55. Colts 10–0. **Drive: 1 play, 16 yards, 0:08.**

**Second quarter**

- IND – Mike Vanderjagt 46-yard field goal, 12:30. Colts 13–0. **Drive: 5 plays, 29 yards, 0:50.**

**Third quarter**

- No scoring plays

**Fourth quarter**

- IND – James Mungro 1-yard run (kick failed), 8:38. Colts 19–0. **Drive: 9 plays, 55 yards, 3:51.**
- HOU – Kris Brown 34-yard field goal, 3:55. Colts 19–3. **Drive: 6 plays, 4 yards, 0:53.**

**Top passers**

- HOU – David Carr – 20/35, 137 yards
- IND – Peyton Manning – 15/28, 190 yards, TD

**Top rushers**

- HOU – James Allen – 16 rushes, 64 yards
- IND – Edgerrin James – 20 rushes, 65 yards

**Top receivers**

- HOU – James Allen – 10 receptions, 49 yards
- IND – Marvin Harrison – 9 receptions, 101 yards

==== Week 14: at Pittsburgh Steelers ====
Week 14: Houston Texans at Pittsburgh Steelers – Game summary

Quarter	1	2	3	4	Total
**Texans**	14	0	0	10	**24**
Steelers	0	3	3	0	**6**

at Heinz Field, Pittsburgh, Pennsylvania

- Date: December 8, 2002
- Game time: 12:00 p.m. CST
- Game attendance: 58,551
- Referee: Bob McElwee
- TV announcers (CBS): Ian Eagle and Solomon Wilcots
- Recap

Game information

**First quarter**

- HOU – Kenny Wright 40-yard fumble return (Kris Brown kick), 6:15. Texans 7–0.
- HOU – Aaron Glenn 70-yard interception return (Kris Brown kick), 2:30. Texans 14–0.

**Second quarter**

- PIT – Jeff Reed 40-yard field goal, 0:25. Texans 14–3. **Drive: 10 plays, 57 yards, 2:28.**

**Third quarter**

- PIT – Jeff Reed 31-yard field goal, 9:45. Texans 14–6. **Drive: 10 plays, 51 yards, 5:08.**

**Fourth quarter**

- HOU – Kris Brown 43-yard field goal, 3:40. Texans 17–6. **Drive: 4 plays, −5 yards, 0:17.**
- HOU – Aaron Glenn 65-yard interception return, 2:21. Texans 24–6.

**Top passers**

- HOU – David Carr – 3/10, 33 yards
- PIT – Tommy Maddox – 30/57, 325 yards, 2 INT

**Top rushers**

- HOU – James Allen – 13 rushes, 19 yards
- PIT – Amos Zereoue – 11 rushes, 69 yards

**Top receivers**

- HOU – Billy Miller – 3 receptions, 33 yards
- PIT – Antwaan Randle El – 8 receptions, 88 yards

The Texans had one of the worst offensive performances ever in an NFL game, only having 47 total yards of offense while the Steelers had 422 yards. The Texans' defense forced five turnovers and scored three touchdowns. Pittsburgh quarterback Tommy Maddox threw two interceptions, both of which were returned for touchdowns by Houston cornerback Aaron Glenn; Maddox also lost a fumble that was recovered by Texans cornerback Kenny Wright for a touchdown.

==== Week 15: vs. Baltimore Ravens ====
Week 15: Baltimore Ravens at Houston Texans – Game summary

Quarter	1	2	3	4	Total
**Ravens**	3	10	7	3	**23**
Texans	0	7	7	5	**19**

at Reliant Stadium, Houston, Texas

- Date: December 15, 2002
- Game time: 12:00 p.m. CST
- Game attendance: 70,108
- Referee: Bernie Kukar
- TV announcers (CBS): Bill Macatee and Craig James
- Recap

Game information

**First quarter**

- BAL – Matt Stover 22-yard field goal, 7:30. Ravens 3–0. **Drive: 4 plays, 8 yards, 0:50.**

**Second quarter**

- HOU – Jonathan Wells 1-yard run (Kris Brown kick), 13:45. Texans 7–3. **Drive: 14 plays, 91 yards, 18:27.**
- BAL – Matt Stover 22-yard field goal, 12:00. Texans 7–6. **Drive: 9 plays, 42 yards, 0:43.**
- BAL – Travis Taylor 26-yard pass from Jeff Blake (Matt Stover kick), 2:00. Ravens 13–7. **Drive: 7 plays, 97 yards, 5:00.**

**Third quarter**

- BAL – Chester Taylor 11-yard pass from Jeff Blake (Matt Stover kick), 7:30. Ravens 20–7. **Drive: 11 plays, 84 yards, 4:00.**
- HOU – Avion Black 76-yard punt return (Kris Brown kick), 0:59. Ravens 20–14.

**Fourth quarter**

- BAL – Matt Stover 47-yard field goal, 9:00. Ravens 23–14. **Drive: 11 plays, 57 yards, 4:00.**
- HOU – Kris Brown 41-yard field goal, 3:40. Ravens 23–17. **Drive: 11 plays, 57 yards, 2:21.**
- HOU – Team safety, 2:28. Ravens 23–19.

**Top passers**

- BAL – Jeff Blake – 18/30, 228 yards, 2 TD
- HOU – David Carr – 19/34, 196 yards, 2 INT

**Top rushers**

- BAL – Jamal Lewis – 20 rushes, 49 yards
- HOU – Jonathan Wells – 14 rushes, 48 yards, TD

**Top receivers**

- BAL – Travis Taylor – 5 receptions, 96 yards, TD
- HOU – Billy Miller – 8 receptions, 77 yards

==== Week 16: at Washington Redskins ====
Week 16: Houston Texans at Washington Redskins – Game summary

Quarter	1	2	3	4	Total
Texans	3	0	0	7	**10**
**Redskins**	7	9	0	10	**26**

at FedExField, Landover, Maryland

- Date: December 22, 2002
- Game time: 12:00 p.m. CST
- Game attendance: 70,291
- Referee: Jeff Triplette
- TV announcers (CBS): Don Criqui and Steve Tasker
- Recap

Game information

**First quarter**

- HOU – Kris Brown 47-yard field goal, 7:42. Texans 3–0. **Drive: 6 plays, 10 yards, 2:06.**
- WSH – Rock Cartwright 12-yard pass from Patrick Ramsey (José Cortez kick), 3:33. Redskins 7–3. **Drive: 7 plays, 73 yards, 2:29.**

**Second quarter**

- WSH – Houston penalty in end zone, 14:05. Redskins 9–3.
- WSH – Derrius Thompson 13-yard pass from Patrick Ramsey (José Cortez kick), 1:15. Redskins 16–3. **Drive: 7 plays, 80 yards, 1:57.**

**Third quarter**

- No scoring plays

**Fourth quarter**

- WSH – Ladell Betts 3-yard run (José Cortez kick), 14:30. Redskins 23–3. **Drive: 9 plays, 54 yards, 12:19.**
- HOU – Kevin Williams blocked punt recovery, 9:46. Redskins 23–10.
- WSH – José Cortez 23-yard field goal, 2:54. Redskins 26–10. **Drive: 11 plays, 69 yards, 5:53.**

**Top passers**

- HOU – David Carr – 12/31, 112 yards, INT
- WSH – Patrick Ramsey – 14/31, 190 yards, 2 TD

**Top rushers**

- HOU – Jonathan Wells – 15 rushes, 33 yards
- WSH – Ladell Betts – 20 rushes, 116 yards, TD

**Top receivers**

- HOU – Corey Bradford – 5 receptions, 43 yards
- WSH – Derrius Thompson – 5 receptions, 73 yards, TD

==== Week 17: vs. Tennessee Titans ====
Week 17: Tennessee Titans at Houston Texans – Game summary

Quarter	1	2	3	4	Total
**Titans**	3	3	0	7	**13**
Texans	0	0	3	0	**3**

at Reliant Stadium, Houston, Texas

- Date: December 29, 2002
- Game time: 12:00 p.m. CST
- Game attendance: 70,694
- Referee: Walt Coleman
- TV announcers (CBS): Ian Eagle and Solomon Wilcots
- Recap

Game information

**First quarter**

- TEN – Joe Nedney 28-yard field goal, 4:01. Titans 3–0. **Drive: 7 plays, 59 yards, 3:34.**

**Second quarter**

- TEN – Joe Nedney 26-yard field goal, 2:56. Titans 6–0. **Drive: 5 plays, 14 yards, 1:48.**

**Third quarter**

- HOU – Kris Brown 42-yard field goal, 1:19. Titans 6–3. **Drive: 3 plays, 60 yards, 0:13.**

**Fourth quarter**

- TEN – Eddie George 5-yard run (Joe Nedney kick), 5:24. Titans 13–3. **Drive: 8 plays, 57 yards, 4:09.**

**Top passers**

- TEN – Steve McNair – 8/22, 148 yards
- HOU – David Carr – 21/40, 214 yards, INT

**Top rushers**

- TEN – Eddie George – 25 rushes, 102 yards, TD
- HOU – Jonathan Allen – 6 rushes, 20 yards

**Top receivers**

- TEN – Drew Bennett – 2 receptions, 58 yards
- HOU – Jabar Gaffney – 6 receptions, 73 yards

This was the Titans' first game to be played in Houston since December 15, 1996 when the team was known as the Houston Oilers.

=== Standings ===
==== Division ====
AFC South
	W	L	T	PCT	DIV	CONF	PF	PA	STK
^{(2)} Tennessee Titans	11	5	0	.688	6–0	9–3	367	324	W5
^{(5)} Indianapolis Colts	10	6	0	.625	4–2	8–4	349	313	W1
Jacksonville Jaguars	6	10	0	.375	1–5	4–8	328	315	L2
Houston Texans	4	12	0	.250	1–5	2–10	213	356	L3

==== Conference ====
AFC
#	Team	Division	W	L	T	PCT	DIV	CONF	SOS	SOV
**Division leaders**
1 (Note: Oakland finished ahead of Tennessee based on head-to-head victory.)	Oakland Raiders	West	11	5	0	.688	4–2	9–3	.529	.531
2	Tennessee Titans	South	11	5	0	.688	6–0	9–3	.479	.474
3	Pittsburgh Steelers	North	10	5	1	.656	6–0	8–4	.486	.451
4 (Note: N.Y. Jets finished ahead of New England based on win percentage in common games (8–4 to 7–5) after both finished ahead of Miami based on division record (4–2 to 2–4).)	New York Jets	East	9	7	0	.563	4–2	6–6	.500	.500
**Wild Cards**
5	Indianapolis Colts	South	10	6	0	.625	4–2	8–4	.479	.400
6 (Note: Cleveland finished ahead of Denver and New England based on conference record (7–5 vs 5–7/6–6))	Cleveland Browns	North	9	7	0	.563	3–3	7–5	.486	.413
**Did not qualify for the postseason**
7 (Note: Denver finished ahead of New England based on head-to-head victory.)	Denver Broncos	West	9	7	0	.563	3–3	5–7	.527	.486
8 (Note: New England finished ahead of Miami based on division record (4–2 to 2–4).)	New England Patriots	East	9	7	0	.563	4–2	6–6	.525	.455
9	Miami Dolphins	East	9	7	0	.563	2–4	7–5	.508	.486
10 (Note: Buffalo finished ahead of San Diego based on head-to-head victory.)	Buffalo Bills	East	8	8	0	.500	2–4	5–7	.473	.352
11 (Note: San Diego finished ahead of Kansas City based on division record (3–3 to 2–4).)	San Diego Chargers	West	8	8	0	.500	3–3	6–6	.492	.453
12	Kansas City Chiefs	West	8	8	0	.500	2–4	6–6	.527	.516
13	Baltimore Ravens	North	7	9	0	.438	3–3	7–5	.506	.384
14	Jacksonville Jaguars	South	6	10	0	.375	1–5	4–8	.506	.438
15	Houston Texans	South	4	12	0	.250	1–5	2–10	.518	.492
16	Cincinnati Bengals	North	2	14	0	.125	0–6	1–11	.537	.406
**Tiebreakers** (Note: When breaking ties for three or more teams under the NFL's rules, they are first broken within divisions, then comparing only the highest ranked remaining team from each division.)

== Statistics ==
Despite being in their first season, Football Outsiders calculated that the Texans were, play-for-play, the least successful team in the NFL in 2002. FO also stated that the 2002 Texans had the worst offense and third-worst run offense they have ever tracked.

=== Team ===
Category	Total yards	Yards per game	NFL rank (out of 32)
Passing offense	2,225	139.1	32nd
Rushing offense	1,347	84.2	31st
Total offense	3,572	223.3	32nd
Passing defense	3,141	196.3	10th
Rushing defense	2,089	130.6	28th
Total defense	5,230	326.9	16th

=== Individual ===
Category	Player	Total
Offense
Passing yards	David Carr	2,592
Passing touchdowns	David Carr	9
Rushing yards	Jonathan Wells	529
Rushing touchdowns	Jonathan Wells; David Carr	3
Receiving yards	Corey Bradford	697
Receiving touchdowns	Corey Bradford	6
Defense
Tackles (Solo)	Jay Foreman	105
Sacks	Jeff Posey	8
Interceptions	Aaron Glenn	5
