= 2004 Houston Texans season =

3rd season in franchise history

- Owner: Bob McNair
- General manager: Charley Casserly
- Head coach: Dom Capers
- Home stadium: Reliant Stadium

Results
- Record: 7–9
- Division place: 3rd AFC South
- Playoffs: Did not qualify
- Pro Bowlers: WR Andre Johnson

The 2004 season was the Houston Texans' third in the National Football League, all of which they had spent under head coach Dom Capers. The team finished 7–9, two games better than the previous season, and came third in the AFC South, the first time they had not finished bottom. The Texans also earned their first victory over the Tennessee Titans, the franchise previously known as the Oilers, who had left Houston after the 1996 season.

Quarterback David Carr, who missed four games the previous season, started all 16 games in 2004. Carr finished 2004 as his best season with Houston, finishing 285-of-466 for 3,531 yards with 16 touchdowns and 14 interceptions. Carr's 466 attempts, 3,531 passing yards, and 16 passing touchdowns would all be career highs for him. Additionally, this was the first season Carr finished with more touchdowns than interceptions.

== Offseason ==
=== NFL draft ===
2004 Houston Texans draft
Round	Pick	Player	Position	College	Notes
1	10	Dunta Robinson	Cornerback	South Carolina	
1	27	Jason Babin *	Outside linebacker	Western Michigan	from Tennessee
4	122	Glenn Earl	Safety	Notre Dame	from Indianapolis
6	170	Vontez Duff	Cornerback	Notre Dame	
6	175	Jammal Lord	Running back	Nebraska	
6	200	Charlie Anderson	Linebacker	Mississippi	Compensatory selection
7	210	Raheem Orr	Linebacker	Rutgers	from Jacksonville
7	211	Sloan Thomas	Wide receiver	Texas	
7	248	B. J. Symons	Quarterback	Texas Tech	Compensatory selection
Made roster * Made at least one Pro Bowl during career

== Staff ==
2004 Houston Texans staff
Front office: Founder, chairman and chief executive officer – Bob McNair; Senior vice president and general manager – Charley Casserly; Associate director of pro scouting – Bobby Grier; Associate director of pro scouting – Miller McCalmon; Coordinator of college scouting – Mike Maccagnan; Head coaches: Head coach – Dom Capers; Offensive coaches: Offensive coordinator – Chris Palmer; Quarterbacks – Greg Roman; Running backs – Chick Harris; Wide receivers – Kippy Brown; Tight ends – Tony Marciano; Offensive line – Joe Pendry; Assistant offensive line – Steve Marshall	Defensive coaches: Defensive coordinator – Vic Fangio; Defensive line – Todd Grantham; Linebackers – Tom Olivadotti; Defensive backs (secondary) – Jon Hoke; Assistant defensive backs (secondary) – Tony Oden; Special teams coaches: Special teams – Joe Marciano; Special teams assistant – Eric Sutulovich; Strength and conditioning: Strength and conditioning – Dan Riley; Assistant strength and conditioning – Ray Wright

== Roster ==
2004 Houston Texans roster
Quarterbacks (QB): 12 Tony Banks; 8 David Carr; 4 Dave Ragone; Running backs (RB): 47 Jarrod Baxter FB; 37 Domanick Davis; 25 Tony Hollings; 44 Moran Norris FB; 32 Jonathan Wells; Wide receivers (WR): 88 Derick Armstrong; 85 Corey Bradford; 86 Jabar Gaffney; 80 Andre Johnson; 84 J. J. Moses; 17 Kendrick Starling; Tight ends (TE): 87 Mark Bruener; 82 Billy Miller; 81 Matt Murphy	Offensive linemen (OL): 67 Milford Brown G; 60 Brandon Evans G; 73 Garrick Jones; 76 Steve McKinney C; 69 Chester Pitts G; 68 Marcus Spears RT; 71 Todd Wade RT; 78 Seth Wand LT; 77 Todd Washington C; 70 Fred Weary G; Defensive linemen (DL): 95 Jerry DeLoach DE; 94 Junior Ioane NT; 91 Seth Payne NT; 92 Corey Sears DE; 99 Robaire Smith DE; 96 Gary Walker DE	Linebackers (LB): 58 D. D. Acholonu ILB; 50 Charlie Anderson OLB; 93 Jason Babin OLB; 57 Quincy Monk ILB; 53 Shantee Orr OLB; 51 DaShon Polk ILB; 55 Jamie Sharper ILB; 52 Kailee Wong OLB; Defensive backs (DB): 24 Eric Brown SS; 26 Glenn Earl SS; 38 Demarcus Faggins CB; 31 Aaron Glenn CB; 20 Jammal Lord FS; 29 Marlon McCree SS; 23 Dunta Robinson CB; 30 Jason Simmons S; 43 Kenny Wright CB; Special teams (ST): 3 Kris Brown K; 48 Bryan Pittman LS; 7 Chad Stanley P	Practice squad: 97 Jason Davis DE; -- Anthony Dunn OLB; -- Reese Hicks RT; -- Allen Suber WR; 19 Sloan Thomas WR; -- Renaldo Works RB; -- David Young S; Reserve: 27 Jason Anderson RB (IR); 33 Jason Bell CB (IR); -- Marcus Bell ILB (IR); 42 Marcus Coleman S (IR); 54 Troy Evans OLB (IR); 56 Jay Foreman OLB (IR); 83 Bennie Joppru TE (PUP); -- Dennis O'Sullivan C (IR); 98 Antwan Peek OLB (IR); 41 Ramon Walker S (PUP); 2 B. J. Symons QB (PUP); 72 Zach Wiegert G (IR); Rookies in italics 53 active, 12 reserve, 8 practice squad

== Preseason ==
Week	Date	Opponent	Result	Record	Venue	Recap
1	August 15	Dallas Cowboys	W 18–0	1–0	Reliant Stadium	Recap
2	August 22	at Pittsburgh Steelers	L 3–38	1–1	Heinz Field	Recap
3	August 28	at Denver Broncos	L 17–31	1–2	Invesco Field at Mile High	Recap
4	September 3	Tampa Bay Buccaneers	L 9–17	1–3	Reliant Stadium	Recap

== Regular season ==
=== Schedule ===
Week	Date	Opponent	Result	Record	Venue	Recap
1	September 12	San Diego Chargers	**L** 20–27	0–1	Reliant Stadium	Recap
2	September 19	at Detroit Lions	**L** 16–28	0–2	Ford Field	Recap
3	September 26	at Kansas City Chiefs	**W** 24–21	1–2	Arrowhead Stadium	Recap
4	October 3	Oakland Raiders	**W** 30–17	2–2	Reliant Stadium	Recap
5	October 10	Minnesota Vikings	**L** 28–34 (OT)	2–3	Reliant Stadium	Recap
6	October 17	at **Tennessee Titans**	**W** 20–10	3–3	The Coliseum	Recap
7	Bye					
8	October 31	**Jacksonville Jaguars**	**W** 20–6	4–3	Reliant Stadium	Recap
9	November 7	at Denver Broncos	**L** 13–31	4–4	Invesco Field at Mile High	Recap
10	November 14	at **Indianapolis Colts**	**L** 14–49	4–5	RCA Dome	Recap
11	November 21	Green Bay Packers	**L** 13–16	4–6	Reliant Stadium	Recap
12	November 28	**Tennessee Titans**	**W** 31–21	5–6	Reliant Stadium	Recap
13	December 5	at New York Jets	**L** 7–29	5–7	Giants Stadium	Recap
14	December 12	**Indianapolis Colts**	**L** 14–23	5–8	Reliant Stadium	Recap
15	December 19	at Chicago Bears	**W** 24–5	6–8	Soldier Field	Recap
16	December 26	at **Jacksonville Jaguars**	**W** 21–0	7–8	Alltel Stadium	Recap
17	January 2	Cleveland Browns	**L** 14–22	7–9	Reliant Stadium	Recap
Note: Intra-division opponents are in **bold** text.

=== Game summaries ===
==== Week 1: vs. San Diego Chargers ====
Week One: San Diego Chargers at Houston Texans – Game summary

Quarter	1	2	3	4	Total
**Chargers**	3	7	10	7	**27**
Texans	3	10	7	0	**20**

at Reliant Stadium, Houston, Texas

- Date: September 12
- Game time: 12:00 p.m. CDT
- Game weather: None (retractable roof closed)
- Game attendance: 70,255
- Referee: Bill Leavy
- TV announcers (CBS): Gus Johnson and Brent Jones
- Box score

Game information

**First quarter**

- HOU – Kris Brown 37-yard field goal, 11:49. Texans 3–0. **Drive: 8 plays, 58 yards, 3:00.**
- SD – Nate Kaeding 48-yard field goal, 6:35. Tied 3–3. **Drive: 9 plays, 48 yards, 5:03.**

**Second quarter**

- HOU – Kris Brown 20-yard field goal, 14:07. Texans 6–3. **Drive: 13 plays, 71 yards, 7:20.**
- SD – LaDainian Tomlinson 1-yard run (Nate Kaeding kick), 9:51. Chargers 10–6. **Drive: 5 plays, 45 yards, 2:22.**
- HOU – Domanick Williams 2-yard run (Kris Brown kick), 4:43. Texans 13–10. **Drive: 9 plays, 70 yards, 4:58.**

**Third quarter**

- SD – Reche Caldwell 36-yard pass from Drew Brees (Nate Kaeding kick), 9:12. Chargers 17–13. **Drive: 4 plays, 49 yards, 1:33.**
- HOU – Domanick Williams 1-yard run (Kris Brown kick), 4:36. Texans 20–17. **Drive: 8 plays, 52 yards, 4:22.**
- SD – Nate Kaeding 29-yard field goal, 0:00. Tied 20–20. **Drive: 9 plays, 59 yards, 4:27.**

**Fourth quarter**

- SD – Eric Parker 19-yard pass from Drew Brees (Nate Kaeding kick), 8:34. Chargers 27–20. **Drive: 7 plays, 75 yards, 5:11.**

**Top passers**

- SD – Drew Brees – 17/24, 209 yards, 2 TD
- HOU – David Carr – 19/25, 229 yards, 2 INT

**Top rushers**

- SD – LaDainian Tomlinson – 26 rushes, 121 yards, TD
- HOU – Domanick Williams – 21 rushes, 87 yards, 2 TD

**Top receivers**

- SD – Antonio Gates – 8 receptions, 123 yards
- HOU – Domanick Williams – 5 receptions, 70 yards

==== Week 2: at Detroit Lions ====
Week Two: Houston Texans at Detroit Lions – Game summary

Quarter	1	2	3	4	Total
Texans	0	3	7	6	**16**
**Lions**	0	7	14	7	**28**

at Ford Field, Detroit, Michigan

- Date: September 19
- Game time: 12:00 p.m. CDT / 1:00 p.m. EDT
- Game weather: None (played indoors)
- Game attendance: 61,465
- Referee: Jeff Triplette
- TV announcers (CBS): Bill Macatee, Steve Beuerlein
- Box score

Game information

**First quarter**

- No scoring plays

**Second quarter**

- DET – Cory Schlesinger 1-yard pass from Joey Harrington (Jason Hanson kick), 6:56. Lions 7–0. **Drive: 9 plays, 62 yards, 5:09.**
- HOU – Kris Brown 34-yard field goal, 1:06. Lions 7–3. **Drive: 10 plays, 66 yards, 5:05.**

**Third quarter**

- DET – Roy Williams 31-yard pass from Joey Harrington (Jason Hanson kick), 6:38. Lions 14–3. **Drive: 7 plays, 79 yards, 5:24.**
- HOU – Andre Johnson 54-yard pass from David Carr (Kris Brown kick), 2:31. Lions 14–10. **Drive: 6 plays, 83 yards, 3:43.**
- DET – Eddie Drummond 99-yard kickoff return (Jason Hanson kick), 2:16. Lions 21–10.

**Fourth quarter**

- HOU – Corey Bradford 27-yard pass from David Carr (pass failed), 12:20. Lions 21–16. **Drive: 11 plays, 80 yards, 7:39.**
- DET – Roy Williams 14-yard pass from Joey Harrington (Jason Hanson kick), 4:41. Lions 28–16. **Drive: 12 plays, 80 yards, 6:43.**

**Top passers**

- HOU – David Carr – 23/34, 313 yards, 2 TD, INT
- DET – Joey Harrington – 18/25, 176 yards, 3 TD, INT

**Top rushers**

- HOU – Domanick Williams – 25 rushes, 78 yards
- DET – Kevin Jones – 12 rushes, 57 yards

**Top receivers**

- HOU – Domanick Williams – 11 receptions, 95 yards
- DET – Roy Williams – 4 receptions, 73 yards, 2 TD

==== Week 3: at Kansas City Chiefs ====
Week Three: Houston Texans at Kansas City Chiefs – Game summary

Quarter	1	2	3	4	Total
**Texans**	0	6	8	10	**24**
Chiefs	7	0	7	7	**21**

at Arrowhead Stadium, Kansas City, Missouri

- Date: September 26
- Game time: 12:00 p.m. CDT
- Game weather: Cloudy, 71 °F (22 °C)
- Game attendance: 77,433
- Referee: Peter Morelli
- TV announcers (CBS): Kevin Harlan, Randy Cross, Marcus Allen
- Box score

Game information

**First quarter**

- KC – Tony Gonzalez 14-yard pass from Trent Green (Lawrence Tynes kick), 5:35. Chiefs 7–0. **Drive: 9 plays, 80 yards, 4:33.**

**Second quarter**

- HOU – Kris Brown 28-yard field goal, 6:15. Chiefs 7–3. **Drive: 9 plays, 88 yards, 5:14.**
- HOU – Kris Brown 49-yard field goal, 0:10. Chiefs 7–6. '**Drive: 10 plays, 64 yards, 1:37.**

**Third quarter**

- KC – Chris Horn 6-yard pass from Trent Green (Lawrence Tynes kick), 11:10. Chiefs 14–6. **Drive: 8 plays, 48 yards, 3:13.**
- HOU – Marcus Coleman 102-yard interception return (Jonathan Wells run), 3:51. Tied 14–14.

**Fourth quarter**

- KC – Jason Dunn 5-yard pass from Trent Green (Lawrence Tynes kick), 10:55. Chiefs 21–14. **Drive: 8 plays, 54 yards, 3:40.**
- HOU – Jabar Gaffney 9-yard pass from David Carr (Kris Brown kick), 5:20. Tied 21–21. **Drive: 10 plays, 68 yards, 5:11.**
- HOU – Kris Brown 49-yard field goal, 0:02. Texans 24–21. **Drive: 7 plays, 42 yards, 2:11.**

**Top passers**

- HOU – David Carr – 13/25, 233 yards, TD, INT
- KC – Trent Green – 21/30, 226 yards, 3 TD, INT

**Top rushers**

- HOU – Jonathan Wells – 10 rushes, 37 yards
- KC – Priest Holmes – 32 rushes, 134 yards

**Top receivers**

- HOU – Andre Johnson – 4 receptions, 96 yards
- KC – Tony Gonzalez – 8 receptions, 106 yards, TD

==== Week 4: vs. Oakland Raiders ====
Week Four: Oakland Raiders at Houston Texans – Game summary

Quarter	1	2	3	4	Total
Raiders	3	14	0	0	**17**
**Texans**	3	14	3	10	**30**

at Reliant Stadium, Houston, Texas

- Date: October 3
- Game time: 12:00 p.m. CDT
- Game attendance: 70,741
- Referee: Bill Vinovich
- TV announcers (CBS): Gus Johnson and Brent Jones
- Box score

Game information

**First quarter**

- HOU – Kris Brown 46-yard field goal, 3:09. Texans 3–0. **Drive: 9 plays, 55 yards, 4:16.**
- OAK – Sebastian Janikowski 50-yard field goal, 0:42. Tied 3–3. **Drive: 6 plays, 36 yards, 2:17.**

**Second quarter**

- HOU – Jamie Sharper 16-yard fumble return (Kris Brown kick), 11:41. Texans 10–3.
- OAK – Amos Zereoué 55-yard run (Sebastian Janikowski kick), 7:02. Tied 10–10. **Drive: 1 play, 55 yards, 0:15.**
- HOU – Jonathan Wells 1-yard run (Kris Brown kick), 3:25. Texans 17–10. **Drive: 6 plays, 75 yards, 3:20.**
- OAK – Amos Zereoué 3-yard run (Sebastian Janikowski kick), 0:47. Tied 17–17. **Drive: 9 plays, 61 yards, 2:27.**

**Third quarter**

- HOU – Kris Brown 21-yard field goal, 3:03. Texans 20–17. **Drive: 6 plays, 15 yards, 3:21.**

**Fourth quarter**

- HOU – Andre Johnson 15-yard pass from David Carr (Kris Brown kick), 14:48. Texans 27–17. **Drive: 4 plays, 30 yards, 0:33.**
- HOU – Kris Brown 44-yard field goal, 3:19. Texans 30–17. **Drive: 14 plays, 73 yards, 7:29.**

**Top passers**

- OAK – Kerry Collins – 21/38, 237 yards, 3 INT
- HOU – David Carr – 14/23, 228 yards, TD

**Top rushers**

- OAK – Amos Zereoué – 14 rushes, 117 yards, 2 TD
- HOU – Jonathan Wells – 26 rushes, 105 yards, TD

**Top receivers**

- OAK – Ronald Curry – 5 receptions, 69 yards
- HOU – Andre Johnson – 6 receptions, 115 yards, TD

==== Week 5: vs. Minnesota Vikings ====
Week Five: Minnesota Vikings at Houston Texans – Game summary

Quarter	1	2	3	4	OT	Total
**Vikings**	0	14	7	7	6	**34**
Texans	0	0	7	21	0	**28**

at Reliant Stadium, Houston, Texas

- Date: October 10
- Game time: 12:00 p.m. CDT
- Game weather: None (retractable roof closed)
- Game attendance: 70,718
- Referee: Ed Hochuli
- TV announcers (Fox): Curt Menefee, Tim Green
- Box score

Game information

**First quarter**

- No scoring plays

**Second quarter**

- MIN – Randy Moss 1-yard pass from Daunte Culpepper (Morten Andersen kick), 14:11. Vikings 7–0. **Drive: 12 plays, 80 yards, 6:40.**
- MIN – Nate Burleson 5-yard pass from Daunte Culpepper (Morten Andersen kick), 0:36. Vikings 14–0. **Drive: 11 plays, 80 yards, 2:23.**

**Third quarter**

- MIN – Marcus Robinson 10-yard pass from Daunte Culpepper (Morten Andersen kick), 11:50. Vikings 21–0. **Drive: 3 plays, 49 yards, 0:46.**
- HOU – Andre Johnson 2-yard pass from David Carr (Kris Brown kick), 6:52. Vikings 21–7. **Drive: 9 plays, 94 yards, 4:58.**

**Fourth quarter**

- HOU – Domanick Davis 1-yard run (Kris Brown kick), 11:31. Vikings 21–14. **Drive: 6 plays, 58 yards, 3:11.**
- MIN – Randy Moss 50-yard pass from Daunte Culpepper (Morten Andersen kick), 6:49. Vikings 28–14. **Drive: 3 plays, 59 yards, 0:59.**
- HOU – Derick Armstrong 11-yard pass from David Carr (Kris Brown kick), 3:11. Vikings 28–21. **Drive: 12 plays, 58 yards, 3:38.**
- HOU – Andre Johnson 22-yard pass from David Carr (Kris Brown kick), 1:53. Tied 28–28. **Drive: 3 plays, 42 yards, 0:28.**

**Overtime**

- MIN – Marcus Robinson 50-yard pass from Daunte Culpepper, 7:05. Vikings 34–28. **Drive: 6 plays, 81 yards, 2:30.**

**Top passers**

- MIN – Daunte Culpepper – 36/50, 396 yards, 5 TD
- HOU – David Carr – 27/42, 372 yards, 3 TD

**Top rushers**

- MIN – Mewelde Moore – 20 rushes, 92 yards
- HOU – Domanick Davis – 14 rushes, 31 yards, TD

**Top receivers**

- MIN – Marcus Robinson – 9 receptions, 150 yards, 2 TD
- HOU – Andre Johnson – 12 receptions, 170 yards, 2 TD

==== Week 6: at Tennessee Titans ====
Week Six: Houston Texans at Tennessee Titans – Game summary

Quarter	1	2	3	4	Total
**Texans**	3	10	0	7	**20**
Titans	0	10	0	0	**10**

at The Coliseum, Nashville, Tennessee

- Date: October 17
- Game time: 12:00 p.m. CDT
- Game weather: Cloudy, 60 °F (16 °C)
- Game attendance: 68,932
- Referee: Walt Coleman
- TV announcers (CBS): Ian Eagle, Solomon Wilcots
- Box score

Game information

**First quarter**

- HOU – Kris Brown 21-yard field goal, 9:42. Texans 3–0. **Drive: 8 plays, 69 yards, 5:18.**

**Second quarter**

- TEN – Drew Bennett 10-yard pass from Steve McNair (Gary Anderson kick), 12:49. Titans 7–3. **Drive: 5 plays, 32 yards, 2:01.**
- HOU – Jabar Gaffney 20-yard pass from David Carr (Kris Brown kick), 9:12. Texans 10–7. **Drive: 7 plays, 74 yards, 3:37.**
- TEN – Gary Anderson 40-yard field goal, 6:02. Tied 10–10. **Drive: 8 plays, 51 yards, 3:10.**
- HOU – Kris Brown 50-yard field goal, 2:38. Texans 13–10. **Drive: 6 plays, 41 yards, 3:24.**

**Third quarter**

- No scoring plays

**Fourth quarter**

- HOU – Jonathan Wells 4-yard run (Kris Brown kick), 4:42. Texans 20–10. **Drive: 9 plays, 65 yards, 4:43.**

**Top passers**

- HOU – David Carr – 16/26, 266 yards, TD, INT
- TEN – Steve McNair – 19/41, 210 yards, TD, 4 INT

**Top rushers**

- HOU – Jonathan Wells – 22 rushes, 73 yards, TD
- TEN – Chris Brown – 13 rushes, 52 yards

**Top receivers**

- HOU – Andre Johnson – 4 receptions, 66 yards
- TEN – Derrick Mason – 5 receptions, 74 yards

With the win, the Texans improved to 3–3. This was the Texans' first win over the Tennessee Titans, who previously played in Houston as the Oilers from 1960 to 1996.

==== Week 8: vs. Jacksonville Jaguars ====
Week Eight: Jacksonville Jaguars at Houston Texans – Game summary

Quarter	1	2	3	4	Total
Jaguars	0	3	0	3	**6**
**Texans**	7	3	0	10	**20**

at Reliant Stadium, Houston, Texas

- Date: October 31
- Game time: 12:00 p.m. CST
- Game attendance: 70,502
- Referee: Bill Leavy
- TV announcers (CBS): Ian Eagle, Solomon Wilcots
- Box score

Game information

**First quarter**

- HOU – Corey Bradford 15-yard pass from David Carr (Kris Brown kick), 3:20. Texans 7–0. **Drive: 8 plays, 40 yards, 4:50.**

**Second quarter**

- JAX – Josh Scobee 44-yard field goal, 6:33. Texans 7–3. **Drive: 12 plays, 54 yards, 5:37.**
- HOU – Kris Brown 38-yard field goal, 0:00. Texans 10–3. **Drive: 3 plays, 50 yards, 0:15.**

**Third quarter**

- No scoring plays

**Fourth quarter**

- HOU – Kris Brown 21-yard field goal, 6:45. Texans 13–3. **Drive: 12 plays, 54 yards, 5:27.**
- JAX – Josh Scobee 36-yard field goal, 3:52. Texans 13–6. **Drive: 10 plays, 65 yards, 2:45.**
- HOU – Demarcus Faggins 43-yard interception return (Kris Brown kick), 0:42. Texans 20–6.

**Top passers**

- JAX – Byron Leftwich – 25/40, 227 yards, 2 INT
- HOU – David Carr – 26/34, 276 yards, TD

**Top rushers**

- JAX – LaBrandon Toefield – 5 rushes, 22 yards
- HOU – Domanick Williams – 22 rushes, 56 yards

**Top receivers**

- JAX – Jimmy Smith – 9 receptions, 117 yards
- HOU – Jabar Gaffney – 5 receptions, 88 yards

==== Week 9: at Denver Broncos ====
Week Nine: Houston Texans at Denver Broncos – Game summary

Quarter	1	2	3	4	Total
Texans	0	7	0	6	**13**
**Broncos**	7	17	7	0	**31**

at Invesco Field at Mile High, Denver, Colorado

- Date: November 7
- Game time: 3:15 p.m. CST/2:15 p.m. MST
- Game weather: Sunny, 69 °F (21 °C)
- Game attendance: 74,292
- Referee: Jeff Triplette
- TV announcers (CBS): Kevin Harlan, Randy Cross
- Box score

==== Week 10: at Indianapolis Colts ====
Week Ten: Houston Texans at Indianapolis Colts – Game summary

Quarter	1	2	3	4	Total
Texans	0	0	7	7	**14**
**Colts**	7	14	21	7	**49**

at RCA Dome, Indianapolis, Indiana

- Date: November 14
- Game time: 12:00 p.m. CST/1:00 p.m. EST
- Game weather: None (played indoors)
- Game attendance: 56,511
- Referee: Bill Carollo
- TV announcers (CBS): Kevin Harlan, Randy Cross
- Box score

==== Week 11: vs. Green Bay Packers ====
Week Eleven: Green Bay Packers at Houston Texans – Game summary

Quarter	1	2	3	4	Total
**Packers**	0	3	0	13	**16**
Texans	0	13	0	0	**13**

at Reliant Stadium, Houston, Texas

- Date: November 21
- Game time: 7:30 p.m. CST
- Game weather: None (retractable roof closed)
- Game attendance: 70,769
- Referee: Peter Morelli
- TV announcers (ESPN): Mike Patrick, Joe Theismann, Paul Maguire, and Suzy Kolber
- Box score

==== Week 12: vs. Tennessee Titans ====
Week Twelve: Tennessee Titans at Houston Texans – Game summary

Quarter	1	2	3	4	Total
Titans	14	7	0	0	**21**
**Texans**	3	7	14	7	**31**

at Reliant Stadium, Houston, Texas

- Date: November 28
- Game time: 12:00 p.m. CST
- Game attendance: 70,721
- Referee: Larry Nemmers
- TV announcers (CBS): Gus Johnson, Brent Jones
- Box score

Game information

**First quarter**

- TEN – Erron Kinney 12-yard pass from Steve McNair (Gary Anderson kick), 10:13. Titans 7–0. **Drive: 8 plays, 77 yards, 4:47.**
- TEN – Erron Kinney 11-yard pass from Steve McNair (Gary Anderson kick), 5:44. Titans 14–0. **Drive: 6 plays, 42 yards, 3:37.**
- HOU – Kris Brown 29-yard field goal, 0:35. Titans 14–3. **Drive: 10 plays, 60 yards, 5:09.**

**Second quarter**

- TEN – Derrick Mason 4-yard pass from Steve McNair (Gary Anderson kick), 10:38. Titans 21–3. **Drive: 3 plays, 40 yards, 1:26.**
- HOU – Jonathan Wells 7-yard run (Kris Brown kick), 6:46. Titans 21–10. **Drive: 7 plays, 62 yards, 3:52.**

**Third quarter**

- HOU – Billy Miller 14-yard pass from David Carr (Kris Brown kick), 9:20. Titans 21–17. **Drive: 9 plays, 71 yards, 5:40.**
- HOU – Andre Johnson 11-yard pass from David Carr (Kris Brown kick), 2:35. Texans 24–21. **Drive: 4 plays, 27 yards, 1:58.**

**Fourth quarter**

- HOU – Domanick Williams 41-yard run (Kris Brown kick), 1:34. Texans 31–21. **Drive: 2 plays, 44 yards, 0:13.**

**Top passers**

- TEN – Steve McNair – 25/34, 227 yards, 3 TD, INT
- HOU – David Carr – 21/30, 201 yards, 2 TD, INT

**Top rushers**

- TEN – Antowain Smith – 21 rushes, 90 yards
- HOU – Domanick Williams – 16 rushes, 129 yards, TD

**Top receivers**

- TEN – Derrick Mason – 8 receptions, 87 yards, TD
- HOU – Domanick Williams – 7 receptions, 52 yards

With the win, the Texans improved to 5–6, snapped their three game losing streak, and swept the Titans for the first time in franchise history.

==== Week 13: at New York Jets ====
Week Thirteen: Houston Texans at New York Jets – Game summary

Quarter	1	2	3	4	Total
Texans	0	7	0	0	**7**
**Jets**	3	3	7	16	**29**

at Giants Stadium, East Rutherford, New Jersey

- Date: December 5
- Game time: 12:00 p.m. CST/1:00 p.m. EST
- Game weather: Cloudy, 56 °F (13 °C)
- Game attendance: 77,875
- Referee: Tom White
- TV announcers (CBS): Dick Enberg, Dan Dierdorf, Armen Keteyian
- Box score

==== Week 14: vs. Indianapolis Colts ====
Week Fourteen: Indianapolis Colts at Houston Texans – Game summary

Quarter	1	2	3	4	Total
**Colts**	14	0	3	6	**23**
Texans	0	7	7	0	**14**

at Reliant Stadium, Houston, Texas

- Date: December 12
- Game time: 12:00 p.m. CST
- Game attendance: 70,762
- Referee: Ed Hochuli
- TV announcers (CBS): Gus Johnson, Brent Jones
- Box score

With the loss to Indianapolis the Texans were eliminated from playoff contention at 5-8.

==== Week 15: at Chicago Bears ====
Week Fifteen: Houston Texans at Chicago Bears – Game summary

Quarter	1	2	3	4	Total
**Texans**	0	7	0	17	**24**
Bears	0	0	2	3	**5**

at Soldier Field, Chicago, Illinois

- Date: December 19
- Game time: 12:00 p.m. CST
- Game weather: Cloudy, 12 °F (−11 °C)
- Game attendance: 62,122
- Referee: Bill Vinovich
- TV announcers (CBS): Don Criqui, Steve Tasker
- Box score

==== Week 16: at Jacksonville Jaguars ====
Week Sixteen: Houston Texans at Jacksonville Jaguars – Game summary

Quarter	1	2	3	4	Total
**Texans**	7	7	0	7	**21**
Jaguars	0	0	0	0	**0**

at Alltel Stadium, Jacksonville, Florida

- Date: December 26
- Game time: 12:00 p.m. CST/1:00 p.m. EST
- Game weather: Clear, 40 °F (4 °C)
- Game attendance: 66,227
- Referee: Walt Coleman
- TV announcers (CBS): Ian Eagle, Solomon Wilcots
- Box score

Game information

**First quarter**

- HOU – Domanick Davis 1-yard run (Kris Brown kick), 8:33. Texans 7–0. **Drive: 10 plays, 65 yards, 6:27.**

**Second quarter**

- HOU – Andre Johnson 10-yard pass from David Carr (Kris Brown kick), 6:46. Texans 14–0. **Drive: 5 plays, 71 yards, 2:38.**

**Third quarter**

- No scoring plays.

**Fourth quarter**

- HOU – Antwan Peek 66-yard fumble return (Kris Brown kick), 3:11. Texans 21–0.

**Top passers**

- HOU – David Carr – 13/19, 131 yards, TD, 2 INT
- JAX – Byron Leftwich – 6/14, 35 yards, INT

**Top rushers**

- HOU – Domanick Davis – 31 rushes, 158 yards, TD
- JAX – Greg Jones – 9 rushes, 38 yards

**Top receivers**

- HOU – Andre Johnson – 4 receptions, 46 yards, TD
- JAX – Troy Edwards – 3 receptions, 24 yards

This was the first shutout win in Texans history.

==== Week 17: vs. Cleveland Browns ====
Week Seventeen: Cleveland Browns at Houston Texans – Game summary

Quarter	1	2	3	4	Total
**Browns**	3	6	7	6	**22**
Texans	7	0	0	7	**14**

at Reliant Stadium, Houston, Texas

- Date: January 2, 2005
- Game time: 12:00 p.m. CST
- Game weather: None (retractable roof closed)
- Game attendance: 70,724
- Referee: Gerry Austin
- TV announcers (CBS): Craig Bolerjack, Richard Baldinger
- Box score

Game information

**First quarter**

- CLE – Phil Dawson 45-yard field goal, 9:51. Browns 3–0. **Drive: 5 plays, 53 yards, 2:33.**
- HOU – Jonathan Wells 6-yard pass from David Carr (Kris Brown kick), 4:48. Texans 7–3. **Drive: 9 plays, 73 yards, 4:48.**

**Second quarter**

- CLE – Phil Dawson 22-yard field goal, 11:28. Texans 7–6. **Drive: 10 plays, 54 yards, 4:31.**
- CLE – Phil Dawson 29-yard field goal, 2:00. Browns 9–7. **Drive: 11 plays, 76 yards, 5:41.**

**Third quarter**

- CLE – Steve Heiden 9-yard pass from Kelly Holcomb (Phil Dawson kick), 5:24. Browns 16–7. **Drive: 11 plays, 80 yards, 6:56.**

**Fourth quarter**

- CLE – Phil Dawson 45-yard field goal, 14:09. Browns 19–7. **Drive: 4 plays, -3 yards, 1:24.**
- CLE – Phil Dawson 22-yard field goal, 4:01. Browns 22–7. **Drive: 9 plays, 49 yards, 4:46.**
- HOU – Domanick Williams 1-yard run (Kris Brown kick), 1:23. Browns 22–14. **Drive: 9 plays, 64 yards, 2:27.**

**Top passers**

- CLE – Kelly Holcomb – 20/29, 228 yards, TD, 2 INT
- HOU – David Carr – 15/25, 114 yards, TD

**Top rushers**

- CLE – Lee Suggs – 26 rushes, 131 yards
- HOU – Domanick Williams – 17 rushes, 103 yards, TD

**Top receivers**

- CLE – Antonio Bryant – 7 receptions, 87 yards
- HOU – Domanick Williams – 5 receptions, 42 yards

Looking to secure their first non-losing season, the 7–8 Texans hosted the 3–12 Browns in the regular season finale of the 2004 season. Despite only committing one turnover, Houston's offense struggled and only gained 238 yards of total offense compared to Cleveland's 364. The Texans scored a touchdown with 1:23 left to trail 14–22 and attempted an onside kick, but it was recovered by the Browns who would run out the clock to win the game.

=== Standings ===
==== Division ====
AFC South
	W	L	T	PCT	DIV	CONF	PF	PA	STK
^{(3)} Indianapolis Colts	12	4	0	.750	5–1	8–4	522	351	L1
Jacksonville Jaguars	9	7	0	.563	2–4	6–6	261	280	W1
Houston Texans	7	9	0	.438	4–2	6–6	309	339	L1
Tennessee Titans	5	11	0	.313	1–5	3–9	344	439	W1

==== Conference ====
AFC
#	Team	Division	W	L	T	PCT	DIV	CONF	SOS	SOV	STK
**Division leaders**
1	Pittsburgh Steelers	North	15	1	0	.938	5–1	11–1	.484	.479	W14
2	New England Patriots	East	14	2	0	.875	5–1	10–2	.492	.478	W2
3 (Note: Indianapolis clinched the AFC #3 seed instead of San Diego based upon head-to-head victory.)	Indianapolis Colts	South	12	4	0	.750	5–1	8–4	.500	.458	L1
4	San Diego Chargers	West	12	4	0	.750	5–1	9–3	.477	.411	W1
**Wild cards**
5 (Note: New York Jets clinched the AFC #5 seed instead of Denver based upon better record against common opponents (New York Jets were 5–0 to Denver’s 3–2 against San Diego, Cincinnati, Houston, and Miami).)	New York Jets	East	10	6	0	.625	3–3	7–5	.523	.406	L2
6	Denver Broncos	West	10	6	0	.625	3–3	7–5	.484	.450	W2
**Did not qualify for the postseason**
7 (Note: Jacksonville and Baltimore finished ahead of Buffalo because they each defeated Buffalo head-to-head.) (Note: Jacksonville finished ahead of Baltimore based upon better record against common opponents (Jacksonville were 3–2 against Baltimore’s 2–3 versus Pittsburgh, Indianapolis, Buffalo and Kansas City).)	Jacksonville Jaguars	South	9	7	0	.563	2–4	6–6	.527	.479	W1
8	Baltimore Ravens	North	9	7	0	.563	3–3	6–6	.551	.472	W1
9	Buffalo Bills	East	9	7	0	.563	3–3	5–7	.512	.382	L1
10	Cincinnati Bengals	North	8	8	0	.500	2–4	4–8	.543	.453	W2
11 (Note: Houston finished ahead of Kansas City based upon head-to-head victory.)	Houston Texans	South	7	9	0	.438	4–2	6–6	.504	.402	L1
12	Kansas City Chiefs	West	7	9	0	.438	3–3	6–6	.551	.509	L1
13 (Note: Oakland finished ahead of Tennessee based upon head-to-head victory.)	Oakland Raiders	West	5	11	0	.313	1–5	3–9	.570	.450	L2
14	Tennessee Titans	South	5	11	0	.313	1–5	3–9	.512	.463	W1
15 (Note: Miami finished ahead of Cleveland based upon head-to-head victory.)	Miami Dolphins	East	4	12	0	.250	1–5	2–10	.555	.438	L1
16	Cleveland Browns	North	4	12	0	.250	1–5	3–9	.590	.469	W1
**Tiebreakers** (Note: When breaking ties for three or more teams under the NFL's rules, they are first broken within divisions, then comparing only the highest-ranked remaining team from each division.)

== Statistics ==
=== Team ===
Category	Total yards	Yards per game	NFL rank (out of 32)
Passing offense	3,246	202.9	18th
Rushing offense	1,882	117.6	12th
Total offense	5,128	320.5	18th
Passing defense	3,615	225.9	24th
Rushing defense	1,843	115.2	13th
Total defense	5,458	341.1	23rd

=== Individual ===
Category	Player	Total
Offense
Passing yards	David Carr	3,531
Passing touchdowns	David Carr	16
Rushing yards	Domanick Williams	1,188
Rushing touchdowns	Domanick Williams	13
Receiving yards	Andre Johnson	1,142
Receiving touchdowns	Andre Johnson	6
Defense
Tackles (Solo)	Jamie Sharper	96
Sacks	Kailee Wong	5.5
Interceptions	Dunta Robinson	6
