= Jerry DeLoach =

American football player (born 1977)

No. 92, 95
- Position: Defensive end

Personal information
- Born: July 17, 1977 (age 49); Sacramento, California, U.S.
- Listed height: 6 ft 5 in (1.96 m)
- Listed weight: 325 lb (147 kg)

Career information
- High school: Valley (Sacramento)
- College: California
- NFL draft: 2000: undrafted

Career history
- Washington Redskins (2000–2001); Houston Texans (2002–2005); San Francisco 49ers (2006)*
- * Offseason or practice squad member only

Awards and highlights
- Second-team All-Pac-10 (1998)

Career NFL statistics
- Tackles: 132
- Sacks: 3
- Passes defended: 12
- Stats at Pro Football Reference

Jerry Andre DeLoach (born July 17, 1977) is an American former professional football player who was a defensive end in the National Football League (NFL). He played college football for the California Golden Bears. An undrafted player in the National Football League (NFL), DeLoach played for the Washington Redskins from 2000 to 2001 and Houston Texans from the team's first season in 2002 to 2005.

== Early life and college career ==
DeLoach was born and raised in Sacramento, California, where he graduated from Valley High School in 1995. At the University of California, Berkeley, DeLoach played at defensive end for the California Golden Bears from 1996 to 1999. In his first three seasons, DeLoach had 98 total tackles including 19 for loss totaling 80 yards, 6.5 sacks, and one interception. A second-team All-Pac-10 honoree in 1998, he played only three games in his senior season of 1999 due to neck and shoulder injuries. Invited to play in the East West Shrine game and the Senior bowl. Invited to the NFL combine.

== Professional career ==
Following the 2000 NFL draft, DeLoach signed with the Washington Redskins as an undrafted free agent on April 27, 2000. DeLoach was a member of the Washington practice squad during the 2000 regular season. In 2001, DeLoach played in 15 games with four starts for Washington, recording 11 total tackles including a sack, in addition to one pass deflected.

On March 4, 2002, the expansion Houston Texans acquired DeLoach in a trade with Washington in exchange for quarterback Danny Wuerffel, the first trade in the franchise's history. Houston had planned to select DeLoach in the expansion draft before he was pulled from the exemption list after his Washington teammate Matt Campbell was selected. He played in 58 games with 36 starts for Houston from 2002 to 2005, with 121 total tackles, including 2.0 sacks among 13 tackles for loss, and 11 passes deflected.

== NFL career statistics ==
Legend
**Bold**	Career high

Year	Team	Games		Tackles					Interceptions					Fumbles			
Year	Team	GP	GS	Cmb	Solo	Ast	Sck	TFL	Int	Yds	TD	Lng	PD	FF	FR	Yds	TD
2001	WAS	15	4	11	9	2	**1.0**	1	0	0	0	0	1	0	0	0	0
2002	HOU	**16**	**16**	32	24	8	**1.0**	4	0	0	0	0	3	0	0	0	0
2003	HOU	**16**	**16**	**51**	**37**	**14**	0.0	**5**	0	0	0	0	**6**	0	0	0	0
2004	HOU	15	3	25	17	8	0.0	3	0	0	0	0	2	0	0	0	0
2005	HOU	11	1	13	10	3	**1.0**	1	0	0	0	0	0	0	0	0	0
		73	40	132	97	35	3.0	14	0	0	0	0	12	0	0	0	0

== Filmography ==
Year	Film	Role	Notes
2001	House Party 4	cameo appearance	
