= Corey Bradford =

American football player (born 1975)

No. 17, 85
- Position: Wide receiver

Personal information
- Born: December 8, 1975 (age 50); Baton Rouge, Louisiana, U.S.
- Listed height: 6 ft 1 in (1.85 m)
- Listed weight: 201 lb (91 kg)

Career information
- High school: Clinton (Clinton, Louisiana)
- College: Hinds CC; Jackson State
- NFL draft: 1998: 5th round, 150th overall pick

Career history
- Green Bay Packers (1998–2001); Houston Texans (2002–2005); Detroit Lions (2006); Washington Redskins (2007)*
- * Offseason or practice squad member only

Career NFL statistics
- Receptions: 215
- Receiving yards: 3,346
- Receiving touchdowns: 25
- Stats at Pro Football Reference

Corey Lamon Bradford (born December 8, 1975) is an American former professional football player who was a wide receiver in the National Football League (NFL). He played for the Green Bay Packers, Houston Texans, and Detroit Lions. He played college football for the Jackson State Tigers.

== Early life ==
Bradford attended Clinton High School in Clinton, Louisiana, and was a four-year letterwinner in football, basketball, and track & field. In football, he won All-State honors at defensive back as a senior, and was the starting quarterback for two years. In basketball, he won All-District honors, and in track & field, he won the state long jump title as a junior.

== College career ==
Bradford attended Hinds Community College in Raymond, Mississippi, for two years and garnered two varsity letters in track and field.

Bradford attended Jackson State University, and played football his senior year. He was named the Southwestern Athletic Conference "Newcomer of the Year", and was a first-team All-SWAC selection. He finished his impressive season with 48 receptions for 937 yards (19.5 yards per rec. avg.)

== Professional career ==
Pre-draft measurables
Height	Weight	Arm length	Hand span	40-yard dash	10-yard split	20-yard split	20-yard shuttle	Three-cone drill	Vertical jump
6 ft 0 5/8 in (1.84 m)	197 lb (89 kg)	35 1/4 in (0.90 m)	9 3/8 in (0.24 m)	4.47 s	1.66 s	2.66 s	4.36 s	8.07 s	34.5 in (0.88 m)
All values from NFL Combine

Bradford was selected in the fifth round of the 1998 NFL draft by the Green Bay Packers. He played in Green Bay for four years before signing with the Houston Texans as a free agent in March 2002. On March 15, 2006, Bradford signed a four-year contract with the Detroit Lions, which included a $2 million signing bonus; he was released on September 27, 2006, and re-signed with the team on November 16, 2006. On July 26, 2007, he signed with the Redskins and was released on September 1, 2007. Bradford scored 25 receiving touchdowns in his career.

Bradford holds the record for the lowest career catch rate in NFL history (minimum 200 career receptions), catching only 45.7% of the passes that were intended for him.

== NFL career statistics ==
Year	Team	Games		Receiving				
Year	Team	GP	GS	Rec	Yds	Avg	Lng	TD
1998	GB	8	0	3	27	9.0	18	0
1999	GB	16	2	37	637	17.2	74	5
2000	GB	2	2	0	0	—	0	0
2001	GB	16	6	31	526	17.0	56	2
2002	HOU	16	16	45	697	15.5	81	6
2003	HOU	16	6	24	460	19.2	78	4
2004	HOU	15	10	27	399	14.8	47	3
2005	HOU	16	6	34	436	12.8	50	5
2006	DET	9	2	14	164	11.7	23	0
Career		114	50	215	3,346	15.6	81	25
