= Eric Brown (safety) =

American football player (born 1975)

No. 26, 24
- Position: Safety

Personal information
- Born: March 20, 1975 (age 51); San Antonio, Texas, U.S.
- Listed height: 6 ft 1 in (1.85 m)
- Listed weight: 210 lb (95 kg)

Career information
- High school: Judson (Converse, Texas)
- College: Mississippi State
- NFL draft: 1998: 2nd round, 61st overall pick

Career history
- Denver Broncos (1998–2001); Houston Texans (2002–2004); Washington Redskins (2005)*
- * Offseason or practice squad member only

Awards and highlights
- Super Bowl champion (XXXIII); Second-team All-SEC (1997)

Career NFL statistics
- Tackles: 457
- Interceptions: 9
- Sacks: 6.5
- Stats at Pro Football Reference

Eric Jon Brown (born March 20, 1975) is an American former professional football player who was a safety in the National Football League (NFL). He was selected by the Denver Broncos in the second round of the 1998 NFL draft. He played college football for the Mississippi State Bulldogs.

Brown also played for the Houston Texans. He won a Super Bowl championship with the Broncos in Super Bowl XXXIII over the Atlanta Falcons.

== NFL career statistics ==
Legend
	Won the Super Bowl
**Bold**	Career high

=== Regular season ===
Year	Team	Games		Tackles				Interceptions				Fumbles			
Year	Team	GP	GS	Comb	Solo	Ast	Sck	Int	Yds	TD	Lng	FF	FR	Yds	TD
1998	DEN	11	10	31	24	7	0.0	0	0	0	0	1	1	0	0
1999	DEN	10	10	75	61	14	1.5	1	**13**	0	**13**	0	1	0	0
2000	DEN	16	16	92	**78**	14	1.0	**3**	9	0	9	0	**3**	**8**	0
2001	DEN	16	16	77	64	13	**3.0**	2	0	0	0	1	1	0	0
2002	HOU	15	15	69	60	9	0.5	2	7	0	7	0	0	0	0
2003	HOU	16	16	**98**	75	**23**	0.5	1	5	0	5	**3**	0	0	0
2004	HOU	13	4	15	9	6	0.0	0	0	0	0	0	0	0	0
		97	87	457	371	86	6.5	9	34	0	13	5	6	8	0

=== Regular season ===
Year	Team	Games		Tackles				Interceptions				Fumbles			
Year	Team	GP	GS	Comb	Solo	Ast	Sck	Int	Yds	TD	Lng	FF	FR	Yds	TD
2000	DEN	1	1	5	4	1	0.0	0	0	0	0	0	0	0	0
		1	1	5	4	1	0.0	0	0	0	0	0	0	0	0
