= Gary Walker (defensive end) =

American football player (born 1973)

No. 96
- Position: Defensive lineman

Personal information
- Born: February 28, 1973 (age 53); Royston, Georgia, U.S.
- Listed height: 6 ft 3 in (1.91 m)
- Listed weight: 324 lb (147 kg)

Career information
- High school: Carnesville (GA) Franklin County
- College: Auburn
- NFL draft: 1995: 5th round, 159th overall pick
- Expansion draft: 2002: 1st round, 4th overall pick

Career history
- Houston / Tennessee Oilers (1995–1998); Jacksonville Jaguars (1999–2001); Houston Texans (2002–2005)

Awards and highlights
- All-Pro (2002); 2× Pro Bowl (2001, 2002); PFWA All-Rookie Team (1995); Second-team All-SEC (1994)

Career NFL statistics
- Tackles: 433
- Sacks: 46.5
- Forced fumbles: 9
- Fumble recoveries: 3
- Passes defended: 19
- Stats at Pro Football Reference

Gary Lamar Walker (born February 28, 1973) is an American former professional football player who was a defensive end for eleven seasons in the National Football League (NFL). He played college football for the Auburn Tigers, and was selected in the fifth round of the 1995 NFL draft by the Houston Oilers. He also played for the Tennessee Oilers, Jacksonville Jaguars, and Houston Texans.

== College career ==
He accumulated 148 tackles and 15 sacks in two seasons at Auburn University, earning second-team All-Southeastern Conference honors as a senior. Before Auburn, he attended Hinds Junior College.

== Professional career ==
Pre-draft measurables
Height	Weight	Arm length	Hand span	40-yard dash	10-yard split	20-yard split	20-yard shuttle	Vertical jump	Broad jump	Bench press
6 ft 1 3/4 in (1.87 m)	286 lb (130 kg)	33 1/8 in (0.84 m)	11 in (0.28 m)	5.10 s	1.79 s	2.95 s	4.72 s	27.0 in (0.69 m)	8 ft 5 in (2.57 m)	25 reps

He was drafted in the 1995 NFL draft by the Houston Oilers. Acquired by the Jacksonville Jaguars in 1999, he was an alternate selection to the 2001 Pro Bowl. Signed by the Houston Texans in 2002, he was selected to the Pro Bowl in that year, though he was subsequently plagued by injuries. Walker severed his triceps muscle during the 2005 season and was waived by the Texans in March 2006. He was the only Houston Oilers player to play for the Houston Texans.

=== NFL statistics ===
Year	Team	GP	COMB	TOTAL	AST	SACK	FF	FR
1995	HOU	15	31	21	10	2.5	1	0
1996	HOU	16	45	30	15	5.5	1	1
1997	TEN	15	43	30	13	7.0	1	0
1998	TEN	16	47	31	16	1.0	0	0
1999	JAX	16	54	46	8	10.0	0	0
2000	JAX	15	42	39	3	5.0	2	0
2001	JAX	16	43	35	8	7.5	1	1
2002	HOU	16	51	36	15	6.5	1	1
2003	HOU	4	13	7	6	0.0	0	0
2004	HOU	15	29	18	11	0.5	1	0
2005	HOU	11	29	19	10	1.0	1	0
Career		155	427	312	115	46.5	9	3

Key

- GP: games played
- COMB: combined tackles
- TOTAL: total tackles
- AST: assisted tackles
- SACK: sacks
- FF: forced fumbles
- FR: fumble recoveries

== Personal life ==
Walker's son Gary Jr. played college football for the Auburn Tigers and is now a graduate assistant for the program.
