= Quincy Monk =

American football player (1979–2015)

No. 93, 41, 57
- Position: Linebacker

Personal information
- Born: January 30, 1979; Jacksonville, North Carolina, U.S.
- Died: November 24, 2015 (aged 36); Raleigh, North Carolina, U.S.
- Listed height: 6 ft 3 in (1.91 m)
- Listed weight: 250 lb (113 kg)

Career information
- High school: White Oak (Jacksonville)
- College: North Carolina
- NFL draft: 2002: 7th round, 245th overall pick

Career history
- New York Giants (2002–2003); Houston Texans (2004)

Career NFL statistics
- Games played: 15
- Total tackles: 9
- Stats at Pro Football Reference

Quincy Omar Monk (January 30, 1979 – November 24, 2015) was an American professional football player who was a linebacker in the National Football League (NFL) for the New York Giants and Houston Texans. He was selected by the Giants in the seventh round of the 2002 NFL draft. He played college football for the North Carolina Tar Heels.

== Early life ==
Monk was born in Jacksonville, North Carolina. He attended White Oak High School where he played quarterback, safety and defensive end. At White Oak, he also played basketball, and was named All-Conference and All-Area in his junior and senior seasons.

== Professional career ==
=== New York Giants ===
The New York Giants selected Monk in the seventh round (246th overall) in the 2002 NFL draft. He was one of six players from North Carolina taken, which was then the highest since seven were taken in 1998. He signed a three-year $930,500 contract with the Giants on June 24. He recorded three tackles during his rookie season. In 2003, he recorded four tackles for the Giants. He was released as a final cut before the 2004 season on September 5. Throughout his career with New York, Monk was inactive in 19 games and played in 13.

=== Houston Texans ===
Monk signed with the Houston Texans on December 17, 2004 and played in two games for the team, recording two tackles. He was released on August 30, 2005.

=== NFL statistics ===
Year	Team	Games	Combined tackles	Tackles	Assisted tackles	Sacks	Forced fumbles	Fumble recoveries	Fumble return yards	Interceptions	Interception return yards	Yards per interception return	Longest interception return	Interceptions returned for touchdown	Passes defended
2002	NYG	9	3	2	1	0.0	0	0	0	0	0	0	0	0	0
2003	NYG	4	4	3	1	0.0	0	0	0	0	0	0	0	0	0
2004	HOU	2	2	2	0	0.0	0	0	0	0	0	0	0	0	0
Career		15	9	7	2	0.0	0	0	0	0	0	0	0	0	0

== Post-career ==
Monk was hired by Argentum Capital Management as a managing director. A few weeks later he was appointed to the University of North Carolina's Board of Visitors. He also held positions at Citigroup Smith Barney and Captrust following his playing days. He was employed as a senior recruiter at the Select Group in Raleigh, North Carolina.

Monk suffered a stroke in the summer of 2015. Doctors later discovered that he had duodenal cancer. He died on November 24, 2015 at the age of 36.
