= DeMingo Graham =

American football player (born 1973)

No. 71, 70
- Position: Guard

Personal information
- Born: September 10, 1973 (age 53); Newark, New Jersey, U.S.
- Listed height: 6 ft 3 in (1.91 m)
- Listed weight: 310 lb (141 kg)

Career information
- High school: Central (Newark)
- College: Hofstra
- NFL draft: 1998: undrafted

Career history
- San Diego Chargers (1998–2001); Houston Texans (2002); San Francisco 49ers (2003)*; Dallas Cowboys (2004)*
- * Offseason or practice squad member only

Career NFL statistics
- Games played: 60
- Games started: 38
- Fumble recoveries: 1
- Stats at Pro Football Reference

DeMingo Graham (born September 10, 1973) is an American former professional football player who was a guard in the National Football League (NFL). He played college football for the Hofstra Pride. Professionally, he played for four seasons in the NFL, first for the San Diego Chargers from 1998 to 2001. In 2002, Graham was on the inaugural roster of the newly formed Houston Texans.

== Early life and college career ==
Born and raised in Newark, New Jersey, Graham attended Central High School in Newark, where he earned all-state honors in football and also participated in track and wrestling. At Hofstra University, Graham was a four year starter at offensive guard for the Hofstra Pride football team from 1994 to 1997. In 1997, Graham was part of an offensive line that allowed 435.9 yards per game, and the team finished 9–3 with an appearance in the Division I-AA playoffs.

== Pro football career ==
Graham began his professional football career as an undrafted free agent with the San Diego Chargers in 1998. In his rookie year, Graham was on the active roster throughout the season but did not play in any games.

In 1999, Graham played in 16 games with 10 starts at right guard on a team that finished 8–8. Graham returned as right guard in 2000, playing 14 games with one start and seeing action on the field goal protection unit as well. The Chargers fell to 1–15 in 2000.

For the first time in his career, Graham was a full time starter in 2001, starting all 16 games at right guard for the Chargers. The offensive line helped rookie running back LaDainian Tomlinson rush for 1,236 yards, a record for a Chargers rookie.

On April 9, 2002, Graham signed as a free agent with the expansion Houston Texans. Moving to left guard, Graham played in 14 games with 11 starts on a 4–12 team.
