= Jason Anderson (American football) =

American football player (born 1980)

No. 27
- Position: Running back

Personal information
- Born: April 29, 1980 (age 46); Palmdale, California, U.S.
- Listed height: 6 ft 0 in (1.83 m)
- Listed weight: 205 lb (93 kg)

Career information
- High school: Palmdale
- College: South Dakota
- NFL draft: 2004: undrafted

Career history
- Houston Texans (2004–2005)

Career NFL statistics
- Games played: 1
- Rushing att-yards: 0
- Receptions-yards: 0
- Touchdowns: 0
- Stats at Pro Football Reference

Jason Maurice Anderson (born April 29, 1980) is an American former professional football player who was a running back for the Houston Texans of the National Football League (NFL). He played college football for the South Dakota Coyotes. He was with the Texans for two seasons (2004–2005) but only saw action in one game in 2005.
