= Kendrick Starling =

American gridiron football player (born 1979)

No. 17
- Position: Wide receiver

Personal information
- Born: December 27, 1979 (age 46); Marshall, Texas, U.S.
- Listed height: 6 ft 0 in (1.83 m)
- Listed weight: 193 lb (88 kg)

Career information
- High school: Marshall
- College: San Jose State
- NFL draft: 2004: undrafted

Career history
- Houston Texans (2004); Seattle Seahawks (2005)*; New Orleans Saints (2005)*; Houston Texans (2006)*; Rhein Fire (2006); Edmonton Eskimos (2007)*
- * Offseason or practice squad member only
- Stats at Pro Football Reference

Kendrick Ladell Starling (born December 27, 1979) is an American former professional football player who was a wide receiver in the National Football League (NFL). He played college football for the San Jose State Spartans.

== Early life ==
Starling was born and raised in Marshall, Texas. He graduated from Marshall High School in 1999 and played football and ran track in high school.

== College career ==
Starling began his collegiate career at Navarro College, a junior college in Corsicana, Texas. In his two seasons at Navarro, Starling was a two-time first-team All-NJCAA selection with 111 receptions for 2,305 yards and 26 touchdowns. After signing with Marshall University in 2001, Starling did not play a game for the Marshall Thundering Herd football team and transferred to San José State University in 2002.

College recruiting
Name	Hometown	School	Height	Weight	40^{‡}	Commit date
Kendrick Starling; WR	Marshall, TX	Navarro JC	6 ft 1 in (1.85 m)	180 lb (82 kg)	4.4	
Kendrick Starling; WR	Recruit ratings: Rivals: 247Sports:					
Overall recruit ranking: Rivals: 80 (school) 247Sports: 27 (Natl JUCO), 3 (WR), 1 (TX JUCO), 59 (school)
‡ Refers to 40-yard dash; Note: In many cases, Scout, Rivals, 247Sports, On3, and ESPN may conflict in their listings of height, weight and 40 time.; In these cases, the average was taken. ESPN grades are on a 100-point scale.; Sources: "2002 San Jose St. Football Commitment List". Rivals.; "2002 Team Ranking". Rivals.com.; "San Jose State 2002 Football Commits". 247Sports.

As a junior in 2002, Starling made 49 receptions for 603 yards and 5 touchdowns. He also rushed for 36 yards on 5 carries and returned 16 kickoffs for 294 yards. As a senior in 2003, Starling made 28 receptions for 295 yards and rushed 12 yards in 5 carries, including a touchdown. He also returned 20 kickoffs for 562 yards.

== Professional career ==
Pre-draft measurables
Height	Weight	Arm length	Hand span	40-yard dash	10-yard split	20-yard split	20-yard shuttle	Three-cone drill	Vertical jump	Broad jump
6 ft 1 in (1.85 m)	193 lb (88 kg)	31 1/2 in (0.80 m)	8 1/4 in (0.21 m)	4.32 s	1.53 s	2.63 s	3.88 s	6.89 s	33 1/2 in (0.85 m)	9 ft 11 in (3.02 m)
Results are from the NFL Scouting Combine.

Starling was signed as an undrafted free agent by the Texans in 2004. He played in eight games for the Texans in his rookie year. Mainly used on special teams, Starling returned one kickoff for 14 yards and made four tackles on special teams. From September 21 to November 17, he played on the practice squad.

The Seattle Seahawks signed Starling to the practice squad on September 4, 2005, and released Starling on September 20. Starling later signed with the New Orleans Saints and was assigned to practice squad before being waived on December 16, 2005.

Starling played for the Rhein Fire in Düsseldorf after being allocated by the Texans January 13, 2006. On January 28, 2006, he was selected by the Rhein Fire of NFL Europa in the fourth-round. With Rhein, Starling made 13 receptions for 320 yards and 3 touchdowns. The Texans waived Starling on August 28, 2006.

Starling signed with the Edmonton Eskimos of the Canadian Football League on May 24, 2007.

== Legal troubles ==
On October 6, 2021, the Marshall News Messenger reported that a Harrison County, Texas grand jury indicted Starling "for the offense of continuous sexual abuse of a child." Starling was arrested in February 2021 after surrendering himself to the Marshall Police Department.
