= Avion Black =

American football player (born 1977)

No. 89, 88
- Positions: Wide receiver, Return specialist

Personal information
- Born: April 24, 1977 (age 49); Nashville, Tennessee, U.S.
- Listed height: 5 ft 11 in (1.80 m)
- Listed weight: 185 lb (84 kg)

Career information
- High school: Maplewood Comprehensive (Nashville, Tennessee)
- College: Tennessee State (1996–1999)
- NFL draft: 2000: 4th round, 121st overall pick
- Expansion draft: 2002: 1st round, 16th overall pick

Career history
- Buffalo Bills (2000–2001); Houston Texans (2002); New York Giants (2004)*; Minnesota Vikings (2005)*
- * Offseason or practice squad member only

Career NFL statistics
- Games played: 27
- Games started: 0
- Receptions: 14
- Receiving yards: 142
- Touchdowns: 1
- Stats at Pro Football Reference

Avion Carlos Black (born April 24, 1977) is an American former professional football player who was a wide receiver and return specialist in the National Football League (NFL). Drafted by the Buffalo Bills fourth round of the 2000 NFL draft, Avion played two seasons in Buffalo (2000–2001) and one season with the Houston Texans (2002).

== Personal life ==
Avion is the elder of two children, born to Avion Carl Black and Dorothy Elizabeth Johns of Nashville, Tennessee. He has one sister, Carla Johns. Avion is married to the former Shakeyah Thompson. The couple have one son, AJ and one daughter, Kennedi.
