= Jeff Posey =

American football player (born 1975)

No. 96, 90, 58, 98
- Positions: Linebacker, defensive end

Personal information
- Born: August 14, 1975 (age 51); Bassfield, Mississippi, U.S.
- Listed height: 6 ft 4 in (1.93 m)
- Listed weight: 241 lb (109 kg)

Career information
- High school: Bassfield
- College: Southern Miss
- NFL draft: 1997: undrafted

Career history
- San Francisco 49ers (1997–2000); Philadelphia Eagles (2001)*; Carolina Panthers (2001); Jacksonville Jaguars (2001); Houston Texans (2002); Buffalo Bills (2003–2005); Washington Redskins (2006)
- * Offseason or practice squad member only

Career NFL statistics
- Tackles: 354
- Sacks: 20.5
- Forced fumbles: 8
- Fumble recoveries: 3
- Interceptions: 2
- Stats at Pro Football Reference

Jeffery Lavell Posey (born August 14, 1975) is an American former professional football player who was a linebacker in the National Football League (NFL). He was signed by the San Francisco 49ers as an undrafted free agent in 1998. He played college football for the Southern Miss Golden Eagles.

In addition to the 49ers, Posey played for the Carolina Panthers, Jacksonville Jaguars, Houston Texans, Buffalo Bills, and Washington Redskins in his career.
