= Kevin Williams (defensive back, born 1975) =

American football player (born 1975)

No. 23, 28, 38
- Positions: Cornerback, safety

Personal information
- Born: August 4, 1975 (age 51); Pine Bluff, Arkansas, U.S.
- Listed height: 6 ft 0 in (1.83 m)
- Listed weight: 192 lb (87 kg)

Career information
- High school: Pine Bluff (AR) Watson Chapel
- College: Oklahoma State
- NFL draft: 1998: 3rd round, 87th overall pick

Career history
- New York Jets (1998–2000); Miami Dolphins (2000); Philadelphia Eagles (2001)*; Houston Texans (2002)
- * Offseason or practice squad member only

Awards and highlights
- Third-team All-American (1997); First-team All-Big 12 (1997)

Career NFL statistics
- Tackles: 80
- Forced fumbles: 1
- Interceptions: 1
- Stats at Pro Football Reference

Kevin L. Williams (born August 4, 1975) is an American former professional football player who was a defensive back in the National Football League (NFL). He played four seasons for the New York Jets, Miami Dolphins, and Houston Texans.

== Professional career ==
Pre-draft measurables
Height	Weight	Arm length	Hand span	40-yard dash	10-yard split	20-yard split	20-yard shuttle
5 ft 11 1/4 in (1.81 m)	190 lb (86 kg)	32 1/2 in (0.83 m)	8 7/8 in (0.23 m)	4.52 s	1.55 s	2.62 s	3.98 s

=== New York Jets (1998–2000) ===
Williams was selected by the Pittsburgh Steelers but ended up with the New York Jets in the 1998 NFL draft due to a draft day trade. He was selected in the third round (87th overall).

==== 1998 ====
Williams played in 15 games and started in 6 for the Jets in his rookie season, playing free safety and kick returner. He recorded 32 tackles, one interception, and a forced fumble.

==== 1999 ====
Williams had a disappointing 1999 season, only appearing in 4 games. This season was notably the Jets' last season with Bill Parcells as head coach and the team promoted Bill Belichick, the defensive coordinator, to head coach. However, Belichick was uncomfortable with the recent change in ownership and resigned one day after being named head coach in an infamous press conference. In the press conference, Belichick lauded Williams, stating, "that kid has gone through so much and I was just kind of thinking to myself the commitment that Kevin has made just to live and [he represents] what it takes to win in this league..."

==== 2000 ====
Williams played in 9 games and started 7 in his 2000 season with the Jets. He amassed a career high in kick return yards (615) and returned a kick 97 yards for a touchdown.
