= Cameron Spikes =

American football player (born 1976)

No. 71, 73, 78, 76
- Position: Guard

Personal information
- Born: November 6, 1976 (age 50); Madisonville, Texas, U.S.
- Listed height: 6 ft 4 in (1.93 m)
- Listed weight: 325 lb (147 kg)

Career information
- High school: Bryan (TX)
- College: Texas A&M
- NFL draft: 1999: 5th round, 145th overall pick

Career history
- St. Louis Rams (1999–2001); Houston Texans (2002); Arizona Cardinals (2003–2004); Denver Broncos (2005)*; Oakland Raiders (2006)*
- * Offseason or practice squad member only

Awards and highlights
- Super Bowl champion (XXXIV)

Career NFL statistics
- Games played: 63
- Games started: 30
- Fumble recoveries: 1
- Stats at Pro Football Reference

Cameron Spikes (born November 6, 1976) is an American former professional football player who was a guard in the National Football League (NFL). He was selected by the St. Louis Rams in the fifth round of the 1999 NFL draft. He played college football for the Texas A&M Aggies.

== College career ==
At Texas A&M Spikes was a starting tackle in 1997 and moved to guard in 1998

== Professional career ==
=== Pre-draft ===
Pre-draft measurables
Height	Weight	40-yard dash	10-yard split	20-yard split	20-yard shuttle	Three-cone drill	Vertical jump	Broad jump	Bench press
6 ft 3 1/4 in (1.91 m)	314 lb (142 kg)	5.00 s	1.73 s	2.91 s	4.36 s	7.51 s	32 1/2 in (0.83 m)	9 ft 9 in (2.97 m)	23 reps
All from NFL Combine.

=== St. Louis Rams ===
The Rams selected Spikes in the fifth round of the 1999 NFL draft with the 145th overall pick. He played in 19 games for the Rams from 1999 to 2001.

=== Houston Texans ===
Spikes played 12 games with five starts for the Texans in 2002.

=== Arizona Cardinals ===
In 2003, Spikes won a starting job on the Arizona Cardinals, playing in and starting 16 games in 2003 and playing in 16 games (with 9 starts) in 2004.
