= Jason Lamar =

American football player (born 1978)

No. 58
- Position: Linebacker

Personal information
- Born: November 10, 1978 (age 47); Detroit, Michigan, U.S.
- Listed height: 6 ft 0 in (1.83 m)
- Listed weight: 228 lb (103 kg)

Career information
- High school: Ypsilanti (Ypsilanti, Michigan)
- College: Toledo
- NFL draft: 2000: undrafted

Career history
- San Francisco 49ers (2000)*; Hamilton Tiger-Cats (2001); Houston Texans (2002–2003); Edmonton Eskimos (2003–2004); Hamilton Tiger-Cats (2004); Montreal Alouettes (2004); Edmonton Eskimos (2005)
- * Offseason or practice squad member only

Awards and highlights
- Grey Cup champion (2003); CFL East All-Star (2001); 2× First-team All-MAC (1998, 1999)

Career NFL statistics
- Games: 5
- Tackles: 3
- Stats at Pro Football Reference

Jason James Lamar (born November 10, 1978) is an American former professional football player who was a linebacker for one season with the Houston Texans of the National Football League (NFL). He played college football for the Toledo Rockets. He was also a member of the Hamilton Tiger-Cats, Montreal Alouettes, and Edmonton Eskimos of the Canadian Football League (CFL).

== Early life and college ==
Jason James Lamar was born on November 10, 1978, in Detroit, Michigan. He attended Ypsilanti High School in Ypsilanti, Michigan.

At University of Toledo, he lettered for the Rockets from 1997 to 1999.

== Professional career ==
After spending the 2000 season with the San Francisco 49ers, Lamar signed with the Hamilton Tiger-Cats in May 2001. He was a CFL East Division All-Star in 2001.

Lamar was signed by the Houston Texans on January 22, 2002. He played in five games for the Texans in 2002. He was released by the Texans on August 31, 2003.

Lamar was signed by the Edmonton Eskimos in September 2003. The Eskimos won the 91st Grey Cup on November 16, 2003, against the Montreal Alouettes.

Lamar was traded to the Hamilton Tiger-Cats on April 20, 2004. He was released after arguing on the sidelines with head coach Greg Marshall.

Lamar played in two games for the Montreal Alouettes in 2004.

Lamar signed with the Edmonton Eskimos on May 10, 2005.
