= Rashod Kent =

American football player (born 1980)

No. 85, 88
- Position: Tight end

Personal information
- Born: June 7, 1980 (age 46); Fairmont, West Virginia, U.S.
- Listed height: 6 ft 6 in (1.98 m)
- Listed weight: 275 lb (125 kg)

Career information
- High school: Fairmont
- College: Rutgers (basketball)
- NFL draft: 2002: undrafted

Career history
- Houston Texans (2002–2003); → Scottish Claymores (2003); Oakland Raiders (2004)*
- * Offseason or practice squad member only

Awards and highlights
- Second-team All-Big East (2002)
- Stats at Pro Football Reference

Rashod D. Kent (born June 7, 1980) is an American former professional football tight end who played one season with the Houston Texans of the National Football League (NFL). He played college basketball at Rutgers University. He also played for the Scottish Claymores of NFL Europe.

== Early life ==
Rashod D. Kent was born on June 7, 1980, in Fairmont, West Virginia. He played high school basketball at Fairmont Senior High School in Fairmont. He also played football his freshman year.

== College career ==
Kent played college basketball for the Rutgers Scarlet Knights of Rutgers University from 1998 to 2002 as a forward. He played in 28 games, starting 22, as a freshman in 1998–99, averaging 8.8 points, 4.9 rebounds, and 1.6 steals per game. His 66.7% two-point field goal percentage was the highest in the Big East that season. Kent started all 31 games during the 1999–00 season, recording averages of 8.9 points, 6.9 rebounds, 1.6 assists, and 1.7 steals per game as the Scarlet Knights went 15–16. Kent appeared in 26 games, all starts, in 2000–01, averaging 9.8 points, 9.3 rebounds, 1.2 assists, and 1.3 steals per contest. He started all 31 games his senior year in 2001–02, averaging a double-double with 10.5 points, 10.2 rebounds, 1.6 assists, 1.9 steals, and 1.8 blocks per game. The Scarlet Knights finished the season with an 18–13 record and Kent earned second-team All-Big East honors.

== Professional career ==
After going undrafted in the 2002 NFL draft, Kent was signed by the Houston Texans on April 28, 2002. He was released in September 1, signed to the team's practice on September 3, released again on September 10, and signed to the practice squad again on October 4. He was moved to the practice squad's injured list on October 7, 2002. Kent re-signed with the Texans on January 2, 2003. He was allocated to NFL Europe to play for the Scottish Claymores in 2003. He played in all ten games, starting one, for the Claymores during the 2003 NFL Europe season, catching nine passes for 92 yards and one touchdown. Kent was released by the Texans on November 8, 2003, signed to the practice squad on November 12, and promoted to the active roster on December 9. Overall, he appeared in seven games, starting four, for the Texans during the 2003 NFL season and was targeted once. He became a free agent after the season and re-signed with the Texans on March 23, 2004. He was released by Houston for the final time on April 27, 2004.

Kent signed with the Oakland Raiders on August 3, 2004. He was released on August 9, 2004, after suffering an injury.

== Personal life ==
After his NFL career, he spent 27 months in prison for gun and drug charges and then an extra 12 months for violating his release conditions. He was released from prison for the final time in June 2015. He later started a nonprofit that delivers coats and Thanksgiving turkeys.
