= Jarrod Baxter =

American football player (born 1979)

No. 47, 44
- Position: Fullback

Personal information
- Born: March 9, 1979 (age 47); Dayton, Ohio, U.S.
- Listed height: 6 ft 1 in (1.85 m)
- Listed weight: 245 lb (111 kg)

Career information
- High school: Highland (Albuquerque, New Mexico)
- College: New Mexico
- NFL draft: 2002: 5th round, 136th overall pick

Career history
- Houston Texans (2002–2004); Arizona Cardinals (2005)

Career NFL statistics
- Rushing yards: 15
- Receiving yards: 40
- Touchdowns: 1
- Stats at Pro Football Reference

Jarrod Anthony Baxter (born March 9, 1979) is an American former professional football player who was a fullback in the National Football League (NFL) for the Houston Texans and Arizona Cardinals. He was selected by the Texans in the fifth round of the 2002 NFL draft after playing college football for the New Mexico Lobos.

== Early life ==
Baxter attended Highland High School in Albuquerque, New Mexico.

== College career ==
Baxter played college football for the New Mexico Lobos from 1998 to 2001. He rushed for 190 yards and no touchdowns in 1998, 446 yards and four touchdowns in 1999, 559 yards and four touchdowns in 2000, and 907 yards and 11 touchdowns in 2001. Overall, he rushed 463 times for 2,102 yards and 19 touchdowns while also catching 15 passes for 114 yards during his college career. Baxter earned honorable mention All-Mountain West honors in 2000 and 2001.

== Professional career ==
=== Houston Texans ===
Baxter was selected by the Houston Texans in the fifth round, with the 136th overall pick, of the 2002 NFL draft. He officially signed with the team on July 19, 2002. He played in 16 games, starting 10, in 2002, rushing seven times for 14 yards and catching five passes for 33 yards and one touchdown.

Baxter was placed on injured reserve on August 22, 2003. He appeared in eight games, starting one, for the Texans, during the 2004 season, rushing twice for one yard, recording one reception for three yards and making one solo tackle. He became a free agent after the 2004 season and re-signed with the Texans on March 9, 2005. Baxter was released on August 30, 2005.

=== Arizona Cardinals ===
Baxter signed with the Arizona Cardinals on October 11, 2005. He played in eight games, starting two, for the Cardinals in 2005, catching one pass for four yards and recording two solo tackles. He was waived on December 13, 2005.

== Coaching career ==
Baxter was previously the assistant head coach at Westside High School in Houston.
