= Fred Weary (offensive lineman) =

American football player (born 1977)

No. 61, 70
- Position: Guard

Personal information
- Born: September 30, 1977 (age 49); Montgomery, Alabama, U.S.
- Listed height: 6 ft 4 in (1.93 m)
- Listed weight: 305 lb (138 kg)

Career information
- High school: Robert E. Lee (Montgomery)
- College: Tennessee
- NFL draft: 2002: 3rd round, 66th overall pick

Career history
- Houston Texans (2002–2008); Cleveland Browns (2009)*
- * Offseason or practice squad member only

Awards and highlights
- BCS national champion (1998); Second-team All-American (2001); First-team All-SEC (2001)

Career NFL statistics
- Games played: 63
- Games started: 43
- Fumble recoveries: 2
- Stats at Pro Football Reference

Fred Edward Weary Jr. (born September 30, 1977) is an American former professional football player who was a guard in the National Football League (NFL). He was selected by the Houston Texans in the third round of the 2002 NFL draft. He played college football for the Tennessee Volunteers.

== Early life ==
Weary was a standout football player and wrestler at Robert E. Lee High School in Montgomery, Alabama. As a wrestler, he was a three-time Alabama state champion and Reno Tournament of Champions winner, a national level high school wrestling tournament.

== College career ==
He played college football at the University of Tennessee from 1997 to 2001.

== Professional career ==
=== Houston Texans ===
He was chosen in the 2002 NFL Draft by the Texans and started 12 of the 16 games he played in as a rookie.

He suffered a broken leg on December 2, 2007, in a game against the Tennessee Titans. In the 2008 preseason, he was placed on season-ending injured reserve. The Texans released him on October 14, 2008.

=== Cleveland Browns ===
Weary was signed by the Cleveland Browns on August 9, 2009. Within a few short weeks the Browns released him with an undisclosed injury settlement.
