= Kenny Wright =

American football player (born 1977)

No. 20, 43, 25
- Position: Cornerback

Personal information
- Born: September 14, 1977 (age 49); Ruston, Louisiana, U.S.
- Listed height: 6 ft 1 in (1.85 m)
- Listed weight: 205 lb (93 kg)

Career information
- High school: Ruston
- College: Northwestern State
- NFL draft: 1999: 4th round, 120th overall pick

Career history
- Minnesota Vikings (1999–2001); Houston Texans (2002–2004); Jacksonville Jaguars (2005); Washington Redskins (2006); Cleveland Browns (2007)

Career NFL statistics
- Total tackles: 364
- Sacks: 3
- Forced fumbles: 2
- Fumble recoveries: 2
- Interceptions: 7
- Defensive touchdowns: 1
- Stats at Pro Football Reference

Kenneth Dewayne Wright (born September 14, 1977) is an American former professional football player who was a cornerback in the National Football League (NFL). He played college football for the Northwestern State Demons and was selected by the Minnesota Vikings in the fourth round of the 1999 NFL draft.

Wright also played for the Houston Texans, Jacksonville Jaguars, Washington Redskins and Cleveland Browns.

== Early life ==
Wright was born in Ruston, Louisiana and attended Ruston High School.

== College career ==
Wright attended and played college football for three years at Northwestern State University after transferring from the University of Arkansas. He majored in Physical education.

== Professional career ==
=== Minnesota Vikings ===
Wright was selected in the fourth round (120th overall) in the 1999 NFL draft by the Minnesota Vikings. In his rookie season he played in all 16 games with 11 starts and finished the campaign with 80 tackles including a career-high 11 tackles at the New York Giants on December 26. In his second season with the Vikings, he again played in all 16 games and posted 47 tackles. In 2001, his final year for Minnesota, he played in 15 games and finished the season with 45 tackles.

=== Houston Texans ===
Wright began the year with the Vikings, but was waived on July 31, 2002. He was signed by the Houston Texans off waivers on August 1, 2002. In his first season with the Texans he played in all 16 games and finished the year with 34 tackles and one sack. In 2003, he played in 15 games and totaled 53 tackles and a career-high three interceptions. His third season with the Texans was less productive and he finished with only eight tackles.

=== Jacksonville Jaguars ===
Wright was signed by the Jacksonville Jaguars as an unrestricted free agent on March 31, 2005. He started in all 16 games and finished the season with 78 tackles and two interceptions.

=== Washington Redskins ===
Wright was signed by the Washington Redskins as an unrestricted free agent on April 3, 2006. He played in 16 games including nine starts, recording 43 tackles and one interception.

=== Cleveland Browns ===
The Cleveland Browns signed Wright as an unrestricted free agent on March 4, 2007, to a three-year deal. He was released on May 15, 2008.

== 2008 Arrests ==
On April 3, 2008, Kenny was arrested after a foot chase in Pearland, Texas. 1.875 ounces of marijuana was found in his car. It was later revealed that Wright was also arrested on March 1, 2008, for marijuana possession following a traffic stop. Additionally, Wright was suspended for one year by the NCAA while at Northwestern State for testing positive for marijuana during a random drug test. Subsequently, he declared for the 1999 NFL draft with one year of college eligibility remaining.
