= Corey Sears =

American football player (born 2002)

No. 95, 94, 92
- Position: Defensive end

Personal information
- Born: April 15, 1973 (age 53); San Antonio, Texas, U.S.
- Listed height: 6 ft 3 in (1.91 m)
- Listed weight: 314 lb (142 kg)

Career information
- High school: Judson (Converse, Texas)
- College: Mississippi State
- NFL draft: 1996: undrafted

Career history
- Baltimore Ravens (1996)*; St. Louis Rams (1998)*; San Francisco 49ers (1998)*; St. Louis Rams (1998); Arizona Cardinals (1999–2000); Houston Texans (2002–2004)
- * Offseason or practice squad member only

Career NFL statistics
- Tackles: 63
- Sacks: 2
- Stats at Pro Football Reference

Corey Alexander Sears (born April 15, 1973) is an American former professional football player who played defensive end for six seasons in the National Football League (NFL). He played for the St. Louis Rams in 1998, the Arizona Cardinals from 1999 to 2000, and the Houston Texans from 2002 to 2004. He signed with the Baltimore Ravens in 1996, but he did not play.
