= Milford Brown =

American football player (born 1980)

No. 67, 72, 64
- Position: Guard

Personal information
- Born: August 15, 1980 (age 46); Montgomery, Alabama, U.S.
- Listed height: 6 ft 4 in (1.93 m)
- Listed weight: 316 lb (143 kg)

Career information
- High school: Carver (Montgomery)
- College: East Mississippi CC (1999–2000); Florida State (2001)
- Supplemental draft: 2002: 6th round

Career history
- Houston Texans (2002–2005); Arizona Cardinals (2006); St. Louis Rams (2007); Carolina Panthers (2008)*; Jacksonville Jaguars (2008); Detroit Lions (2009)*
- * Offseason or practice squad member only

Awards and highlights
- 2× First-team JUCO All-American (1999–2000); JUCO Lineman of the Year (1999)

Career NFL statistics
- Games played: 53
- Games started: 47
- Stats at Pro Football Reference

Milford Wesley Brown Jr. (born August 15, 1980) is an American former professional football player who was a guard in the National Football League (NFL). He was selected by the Houston Texans in the sixth round of the 2002 Supplemental Draft. He played college football for the Florida State Seminoles after transferring from East Mississippi Community College.

Brown was also a member of the Arizona Cardinals, St. Louis Rams, Carolina Panthers, Jacksonville Jaguars and Detroit Lions.

== Early life ==
Brown played high school football at George Washington Carver High School in Montgomery, Alabama, earning second-team all-state honors.

He attended Alabama State University in 1997 but did not play football.

== College career ==
Brown first played college football at East Mississippi Community College from 1999 to 2000, garnering consensus first-team junior college All-America recognition both years. He was also named the top junior college lineman in the country in 1999.

Brown transferred to Florida State University to play for the Seminoles in 2001. He started all 12 games for the Seminoles in 2001, helping quarterback Chris Rix set the Atlantic Coast Conference single-season record for total yards. Brown attempted to return for another season in 2002. However, before the start of the 2002 season, the NCAA ruled that he had used all of his eligibility due to attending Alabama State in 1997.

== Professional career ==
On September 27, 2002, he was selected by the Houston Texans in the sixth round of the 2002 Supplemental Draft. He officially signed with the team on October 1, 2002. He played in three games, starting two, for the Texans in 2003. Brown was placed on injured reserve on December 27, 2003. He appeared in two games, both starts, in 2004. He became a free agent after the season and re-signed with the Texans on April 15, 2005. Brown played in 13 games, starting 12, in 2005. He became a free agent again after the season.

He signed with the Arizona Cardinals on March 13, 2006. Brown appeared in 13 games, starting 12, for the second consecutive year in 2006. He was released by the Cardinals on June 5, 2007.

Brown was signed by the St. Louis Rams on July 30, 2007. He appeared in a career-high 16 games, starting a career-high 15 games, for the Rams during the 2007 season. He became a free agent after the season.

He signed with the Carolina Panthers on March 28, 2008. He was released on August 30, 2008.

Brown was signed by the Jacksonville Jaguars on September 9, 2008, and played in six games, starting four, for the Jaguars in 2008. He was waived on November 24, 2008.

Brown signed with the Detroit Lions on August 13, 2009. He was released on September 5, 2009.
