= 2005 Houston Texans season =

4th season in franchise history

- Owner: Bob McNair
- General manager: Charley Casserly
- Head coach: Dom Capers
- Home stadium: Reliant Stadium

Results
- Record: 2–14
- Division place: 4th AFC South
- Playoffs: Did not qualify
- Pro Bowlers: WR Jerome Mathis

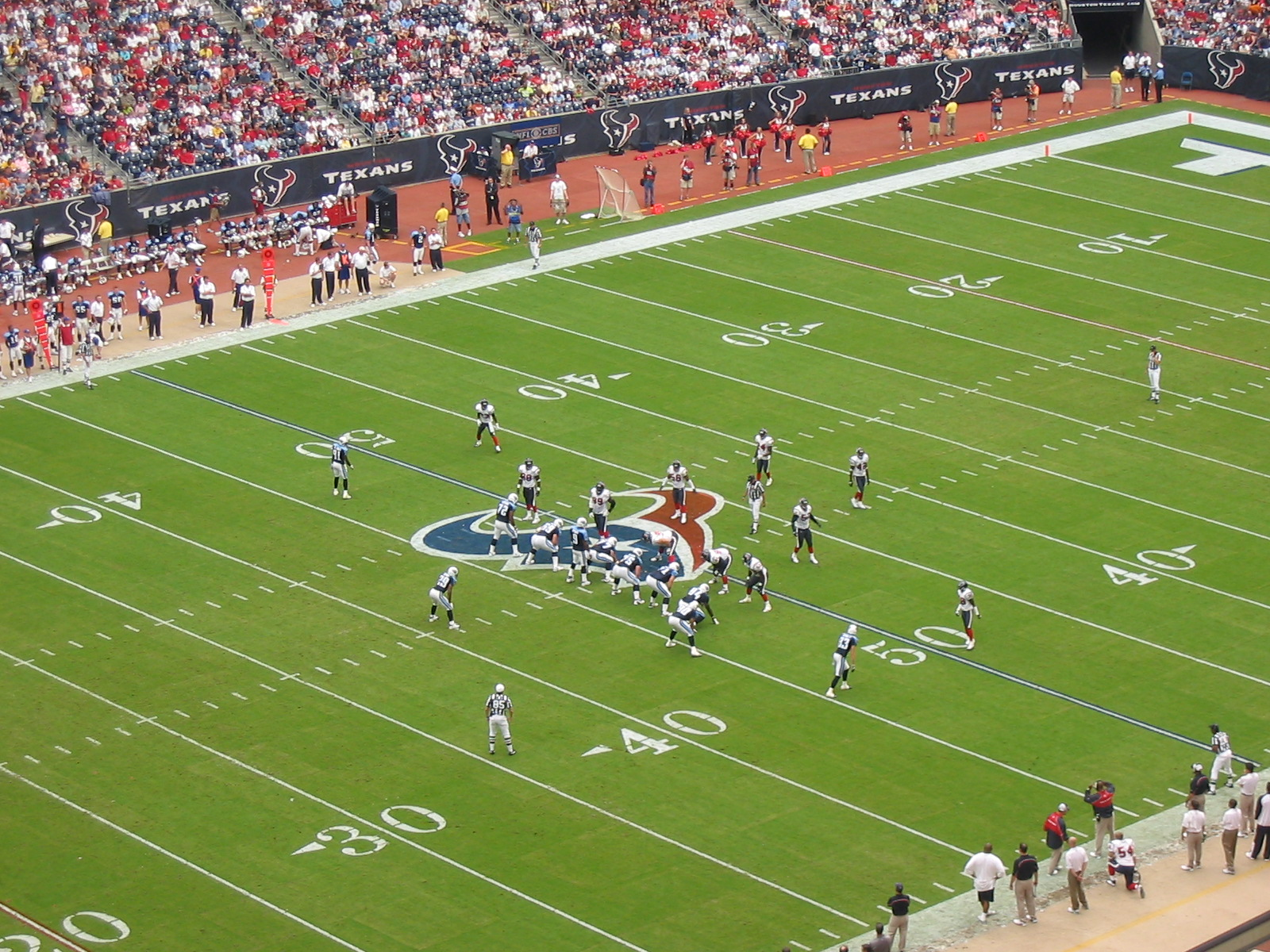
The Texans host the Tennessee Titans, October 9, 2005

The 2005 Houston Texans season was the franchise's 4th season in the National Football League and the 4th and final season under head coach Dom Capers. The Texans completed the season with the worst record in franchise history (a record that would later be matched in 2013). This led to the Texans obtaining the first selection in the NFL draft for the second time since the franchise formed in 2002. The team fired head coach Dom Capers after the season; he was replaced by Denver Broncos offensive coordinator Gary Kubiak, who would coach the team up until 2013. The Texans failed to win a division game, and went 0–8 on the road for the first, and so far, only time in franchise history.

== Offseason ==
=== NFL draft ===
2005 Houston Texans draft
Round	Pick	Player	Position	College	Notes
1	16	Travis Johnson	Defensive tackle	Florida State	
3	73	Vernand Morency	Running back	Oklahoma State	
4	114	Jerome Mathis *	Wide receiver	Hampton	
5	151	Drew Hodgdon	Center	Arizona State	
6	188	C. C. Brown	Safety	Louisiana–Lafayette	
7	227	Kenneth Pettway	Defensive end	Grambling State	
Made roster * Made at least one Pro Bowl during career

== Staff ==
2005 Houston Texans staff
Front office: Founder, chairman and chief executive officer – Bob McNair; Senior vice president and general manager – Charley Casserly; Associate director of pro scouting – Bobby Grier; Associate director of pro scouting – Miller McCalmon; Coordinator of college scouting – Mike Maccagnan; Head coaches: Head coach – Dom Capers; Offensive coaches: Offensive coordinator – Chris Palmer; Quarterbacks – Greg Roman; Running backs – Chick Harris; Wide receivers – Kippy Brown; Tight ends – Tony Marciano; Offensive coordinator/offensive line – Joe Pendry; Assistant offensive line – Steve Marshall	Defensive coaches: Defensive coordinator – Vic Fangio; Defensive line – Mike London; Linebackers – Tom Olivadotti; Defensive backs – Jon Hoke; Assistant defensive backs – Tony Oden; Defensive assistant – Robert Saleh; Special teams coaches: Special teams – Joe Marciano; Special teams assistant – Eric Sutulovich; Strength and conditioning: Strength and conditioning – Dan Riley; Assistant strength and conditioning – Ray Wright

== Roster ==
2005 Houston Texans roster
Quarterbacks (QB): 12 Tony Banks; 8 David Carr; 4 Dave Ragone; Running backs (RB): 27 Jason Anderson; 25 Tony Hollings; 34 Vernand Morency; 44 Moran Norris FB; Wide receivers (WR): 88 Derick Armstrong; 85 Corey Bradford; 86 Jabar Gaffney; 80 Andre Johnson; 13 Jerome Mathis; 11 Donovan Morgan; Tight ends (TE): 87 Mark Bruener; 81 Matt Murphy; 84 Marcellus Rivers	Offensive linemen (OL): 67 Milford Brown G; 76 Steve McKinney C; 69 Chester Pitts G; 68 Tyson Walter C/OT; 78 Seth Wand OT; 77 Todd Washington C; 70 Fred Weary G; 72 Zach Wiegert G/OT; Defensive linemen (DL): 90 Jason Davis DE; 95 Jerry DeLoach DE; 75 Travis Johnson DE; 97 Alfred Malone DE; 91 Seth Payne NT; 99 Robaire Smith DE	Linebackers (LB): 50 Charlie Anderson OLB; 93 Jason Babin OLB; 59 Frank Chamberlin ILB; 54 Troy Evans OLB; 56 Morlon Greenwood ILB; 53 Shantee Orr OLB; 98 Antwan Peek OLB; 55 Kenny Pettway OLB; 51 DaShon Polk ILB; Defensive backs (DB): 33 Jason Bell CB; 24 C. C. Brown S; 42 Marcus Coleman FS; 26 Glenn Earl SS; 38 Demarcus Faggins CB; 20 Jammal Lord FS; 28 Chris McKenzie CB; 23 Dunta Robinson CB; 21 Lewis Sanders CB; 30 Jason Simmons SS; 22 Ramon Walker SS; Special teams (ST): 3 Kris Brown K; 48 Bryan Pittman LS; 7 Chad Stanley P	Practice squad: -- Quinn Dorsey LB; -- Robert Douglas RB; 49 Aaron Halterman TE; -- Elliott Harris DE; -- Reese Hicks G; 73 Garrick Jones OT; -- Andre Torrey LB; Reserve: 31 Phillip Buchanon CB/PR (IR); 37 Domanick Davis RB (IR); 63 Drew Hodgdon C (IR); 94 Junior Ioane NT (IR); 83 Bennie Joppru TE (PUP); 71 Todd Wade OT (IR); 96 Gary Walker DE (IR); 32 Jonathan Wells FB (IR); 52 Kailee Wong ILB (IR); Rookies in italics 53 active, 9 reserve, 7 practice squad

== Preseason ==
Week	Date	Opponent	Result	Record	Venue	Recap
1	August 14	Denver Broncos	L 14–20	0–1	Reliant Stadium	Recap
2	August 21	Oakland Raiders	W 19–17	1–1	Reliant Stadium	Recap
3	August 28	at Dallas Cowboys	L 9–21	1–2	Texas Stadium	Recap
4	September 2	at Tampa Bay Buccaneers	L 14–38	1–3	Raymond James Stadium	Recap

== Regular season ==
=== Schedule ===
Week	Date	Opponent	Result	Record	Venue	Recap
1	September 11	at Buffalo Bills	**L** 7–22	0–1	Ralph Wilson Stadium	Recap
2	September 18	Pittsburgh Steelers	**L** 7–27	0–2	Reliant Stadium	Recap
3	Bye					
4	October 2	at Cincinnati Bengals	**L** 10–16	0–3	Paul Brown Stadium	Recap
5	October 9	**Tennessee Titans**	**L** 20–34	0–4	Reliant Stadium	Recap
6	October 16	at Seattle Seahawks	**L** 10–42	0–5	Qwest Field	Recap
7	October 23	**Indianapolis Colts**	**L** 20–38	0–6	Reliant Stadium	Recap
8	October 30	Cleveland Browns	**W** 19–16	1–6	Reliant Stadium	Recap
9	November 6	at **Jacksonville Jaguars**	**L** 14–21	1–7	Alltel Stadium	Recap
10	November 13	at **Indianapolis Colts**	**L** 17–31	1–8	RCA Dome	Recap
11	November 20	Kansas City Chiefs	**L** 17–45	1–9	Reliant Stadium	Recap
12	November 27	St. Louis Rams	**L** 27–33 (OT)	1–10	Reliant Stadium	Recap
13	December 4	at Baltimore Ravens	**L** 15–16	1–11	M&T Bank Stadium	Recap
14	December 11	at **Tennessee Titans**	**L** 10–13	1–12	The Coliseum	Recap
15	December 18	Arizona Cardinals	**W** 30–19	2–12	Reliant Stadium	Recap
16	December 24	**Jacksonville Jaguars**	**L** 20–38	2–13	Reliant Stadium	Recap
17	January 1	at San Francisco 49ers	**L** 17–20 (OT)	2–14	Monster Park	Recap

Note: Intra-division opponents are in bold text.

=== Game summaries ===
==== Week 1: at Buffalo Bills ====
Week One: Houston Texans at Buffalo Bills

Quarter	1	2	3	4	Total
Texans	0	7	0	0	**7**
**Bills**	6	13	0	3	**22**

at Ralph Wilson Stadium, Orchard Park, New York

- Date: September 11, 2005
- Game time: 1:00 p.m. EDT
- Game weather: Sunny, 76 °F (24 °C)
- Game attendance: 71,781
- Referee: Ron Winter
- TV announcers (CBS): Gus Johnson, Brent Jones
- Box Score

Game information

**First quarter**

- BUF – Rian Lindell 35-yard field goal, 9:24. Bills 3–0. **Drive: 10 plays, 65 yards, 5:36.**
- BUF – Rian Lindell 21-yard field goal, 1:43. Bills 6–0. **Drive: 9 plays, 63 yards, 5:45.**

**Second quarter**

- BUF – Rian Lindell 42-yard field goal, 13:57. Bills 9–0. **Drive: 4 plays, 9 yards, 1:09.**
- BUF – Rian Lindell 39-yard field goal, 11:07. Bills 12–0. **Drive: 4 plays, 6 yards, 2:34.**
- HOU – David Carr 1-yard run (Kris Brown kick). Bills 12–7. **Drive: 12 plays, 75 yards, 4:30.**
- BUF – Jason Peters 1-yard pass from J. P. Losman (Rian Lindell kick), 0:29. Bills 19–7. **Drive: 11 plays, 61 yards, 6:08.**

**Third quarter**

- No scoring

**Fourth quarter**

- BUF – Rian Lindell 31-yard field goal, 7:11. Bills 22–7. **Drive: 6 plays, 10 yards, 2:31.**

Top passers

- HOU – David Carr – 9/21, 70 yards, 3 INT
- BUF – J. P. Losman – 17/28, 170 yards, TD

Top rushers

- HOU – Domanick Williams – 17 rushes, 48 yards
- BUF – Willis McGahee – 22 rushes, 117 yards

Top receivers

- HOU – Mark Bruener – 1 reception, 19 yards
- BUF – Lee Evans – 3 receptions, 68 yards

==== Week 2: vs. Pittsburgh Steelers ====
Week Two: Pittsburgh Steelers at Houston Texans – Game summary

Quarter	1	2	3	4	Total
**Steelers**	10	10	7	0	**27**
Texans	0	0	7	0	**7**

at Reliant Stadium, Houston, Texas

- Date: September 18
- Game time: 12:00 p.m. CDT
- Game weather: Sunny, 95 °F (35 °C) (retractable roof open)
- Game attendance: 70,742
- Referee: Bill Vinovich
- TV announcers (CBS): Don Criqui and Steve Tasker
- Box score

Game information

**First quarter**

- PIT – Jeff Reed 37-yard field goal, 10:07. Steelers 3–0. **Drive: 11 plays, 61 yards, 4:49.**
- PIT – Hines Ward 16-yard pass from Ben Roethlisberger (Jeff Reed kick), 8:04. Steelers 10–0. **Drive: 2 plays, 22 yards, 0:28.**

**Second quarter**

- PIT – Hines Ward 14-yard pass from Ben Roethlisberger (Jeff Reed kick), 14:55. Steelers 17–0. **Drive: 9 plays, 92 yard, 4:21.**
- PIT – Jeff Reed 35-yard field goal, 3:58. Steelers 20–0. **Drive: 9 plays, 69 yards, 4:16.**

**Third quarter**

- HOU – Domanick Williams 3-yard pass from David Carr (Kris Brown kick), 7:05. Steelers 20–7. **Drive: 15 plays, 78 yards, 7:44.**
- PIT – Willie Parker 10-yard run (Jeff Reed kick), 3:51. Steelers 27–7. **Drive: 7 plays, 68 yards, 3:01.**

**Top passers**

- PIT – Ben Roethlisberger – 14/21, 254 yards, 2 TD
- HOU – David Carr – 16/26, 167 yards, TD

**Top rushers**

- PIT – Willie Parker – 25 rushes, 111 yards, TD
- HOU – Domanick Williams – 15 rushes, 59 yards

**Top receivers**

- PIT – Hines Ward – 6 receptions, 84 yards, 2 TD
- HOU – Corey Bradford – 2 receptions, 49 yards

==== Week 4: at Cincinnati Bengals ====
Week Four: Houston Texans at Cincinnati Bengals – Game summary

Quarter	1	2	3	4	Total
Texans	0	3	7	0	**10**
**Bengals**	3	7	0	6	**16**

at Paul Brown Stadium, Cincinnati, Ohio

- Date: October 2
- Game time: 12:00 p.m. CDT / 1:00 p.m. EDT
- Game weather: Cloudy, 79 °F (26 °C)
- Game attendance: 65,714
- Referee: Larry Nemmers
- TV announcers (CBS): Gus Johnson & Steve Tasker
- Box score

Game information

**First quarter**

- CIN – Shayne Graham 24-yard field goal, 4:35. Bengals 3–0. **Drive: 17 plays, 84 yards, 7:52.**

**Second quarter**

- HOU – Kris Brown 28-yard field goal, 13:31. Tied 3–3. **Drive: 12 plays, 43 yards, 9:06.**
- CIN – Jeremi Johnson 1-yard pass from Carson Palmer (Shayne Graham kick), 1:09. Bengals 10–3. **Drive: 11 plays, 85 yards, 3:53.**

**Third quarter**

- HOU – Moran Norris 4-yard pass from David Car (Kris Brown kick), 7:40. Tied 10–10. **Drive: 10 plays, 90 yards, 5:27.**

**Fourth quarter**

- CIN – Shayne Graham 27-yard field goal, 5:04. Bengals 13–10. **Drive: 14 plays, 60 yards, 7:31.**
- CIN – Shayne Graham 46-yard field goal, 1:10. Bengals 16–10. **Drive: 5 plays, 7 yards, 1:59.**

**Top passers**

- HOU – David Carr – 17/26, 174 yards, TD
- CIN – Carson Palmer – 25/34, 276 yards, TD

**Top rushers**

- HOU – Domanick Williams – 19 rushes, 81 yards
- CIN – Rudi Johnson – 19 rushes, 88 yards

**Top receivers**

- HOU – Jabar Gaffney – 6 receptions, 88 yards
- CIN – T. J. Houshmandzadeh – 8 receptions, 105 yards

==== Week 5: vs. Tennessee Titans ====
Week Five: Tennessee Titans at Houston Texans – Game summary

Quarter	1	2	3	4	Total
**Titans**	7	3	14	10	**34**
Texans	0	6	3	11	**20**

at Reliant Stadium, Houston, Texas

- Date: October 9
- Game time: 3:00 p.m. CDT
- Game attendance: 70,430
- Referee: Ed Hochuli
- TV announcers (CBS): Ian Eagle & Solomon Wilcots
- Box score

Game information

**First quarter**

- TEN – Ben Troupe 10-yard pass from Steve McNair (Rob Bironas kick), 5:54. Titans 7–0. **Drive: 16 plays, 70 yards, 8:51.**

**Second quarter**

- HOU – Kris Brown 32-yard field goal, 14:38. Titans 7–3. **Drive: 14 plays, 69 yards, 8:59.**
- HOU – Kris Brown 38-yard field goal, 7:09. Titans 7–6. **Drive: 11 plays, 54 yards, 5:34.**
- TEN – Rob Bironas 52-yard field goal, 2:20. Titans 10–6. **Drive: 10 plays, 47 yards, 4:36.**

**Third quarter**

- HOU – Kris Brown 43-yard field goal, 12:26. Titans 10–9. **Drive: 7 plays, 37 yards, 2:23.**
- TEN – Jarrett Payton 5-yard run (Rob Bironas kick), 6:06. Titans 17–9. **Drive: 7 plays, 76 yards, 2:53.**
- TEN – Drew Bennett 16-yard pass from Steve McNair (Rob Bironas kick), 2:16. Titans 24–9. **Drive: 5 plays, 58 yards, 2:14.**

**Fourth quarter**

- TEN – Rob Bironas 49-yard field goal, 14:06. Titans 27–9. **Drive: 5 plays, 6 yards, 1:37.**
- HOU – Kris Brown 47-yard field goal, 11:32. Titans 27–12. **Drive: 8 plays, 37 yards, 2:22.**
- TEN – Steve McNair 1-yard run (Rob Bironas kick), 7:45. Titans 34–12. **Drive: 9 plays, 23 yards, 3:30.**
- HOU – Corey Bradford 3-yard pass from David Carr (David Carr pass to Corey Bradford), 1:55. Titans 34–20. **Drive: 8 plays, 52 yards, 2:37.**

**Top passers**

- TEN – Steve McNair – 22/31, 220 yards, 2 TD
- HOU – David Carr – 18/27, 131 yards, TD, INT

**Top rushers**

- TEN – Chris Brown – 22 rushes, 78 yards
- HOU – Domanick Williams – 19 rushes, 130 yards

**Top receivers**

- TEN – Drew Bennett – 5 receptions, 99 yards, TD
- HOU – Domanick Williams – 8 receptions, 43 yards

==== Week 6: at Seattle Seahawks ====
Week Six: Houston Texans at Seattle Seahawks – Game summary

Quarter	1	2	3	4	Total
Texans	0	3	7	0	**10**
**Seahawks**	14	7	7	14	**42**

at Qwest Field, Seattle, Washington

- Date: October 16
- Game time: 7:30 p.m. CDT / 5:30 p.m. PDT
- Game weather: Overcast, 57 °F (14 °C)
- Game attendance: 66,196
- Referee: Scott Green
- TV announcers (ESPN): Mike Patrick, Joe Theismann, Paul Maguire, and Suzy Kolber
- Box score

Game information

**First quarter**

- SEA – Shaun Alexander 4-yard run (Josh Brown kick), 8:12. Seahawks 7–0. **Drive: 9 plays, 71 yards, 2:57.**
- SEA – Shaun Alexander 5-yard run (Josh Brown kick), 1:08. Seahawks 14–0. **Drive: 10 plays, 83 yards, 3:51.**

**Second quarter**

- HOU – Kris Brown 39-yard field goal, 7:50. Seahawks 14–3. **Drive: 16 plays, 59 yards, 6:52.**
- SEA – Joe Jurevicius 3-yard pass from Matt Hasselbeck (Josh Brown kick), 1:45. Seahawks 21–3. **Drive: 6 plays, 46 yards, 2:05.**

**Third quarter**

- SEA – Shaun Alexander 1-yard run (Josh Brown kick), 8:23. Seahawks 28–3. **Drive: 12 plays, 70 yards, 6:17.**
- HOU – Domanick Williams 27-yard pass from David Carr (Kris Brown kick), 3:35. Seahawks 28–10. **Drive: 10 plays, 65 yards, 4:34.**

**Fourth quarter**

- SEA – Shaun Alexander 23-yard run (Josh Brown kick), 13:17. Seahawks 35–10. **Drive: 10 plays, 76 yards, 5:18.**
- SEA – Maurice Morris 11-yard run (Josh Brown kick), 5:14. Seahawks 42–10. **Drive: 7 plays, 88 yards, 3:54.**

**Top passers**

- HOU – David Carr – 19/33, 179 yards, TD
- SEA – Matt Hasselbeck – 14/20, 168 yards, TD, INT

**Top rushers**

- HOU – Domanick Williams – 18 rushes, 40 yards
- SEA – Shaun Alexander – 22 rushes, 141 yards, 4 TD

**Top receivers**

- HOU – Jabar Gaffney – 10 receptions, 87 yards
- SEA – Peter Warrick – 3 receptions, 53 yards

==== Week 7: vs. Indianapolis Colts ====
Week Seven: Indianapolis Colts at Houston Texans – Game summary

Quarter	1	2	3	4	Total
**Colts**	7	7	10	14	**38**
Texans	0	14	0	6	**20**

at Reliant Stadium, Houston, Texas

- Date: October 23
- Game time: 12:00 p.m. CDT
- Game weather: None (retractable roof closed)
- Game attendance: 70,621
- Referee: Bill Carollo
- TV announcers (CBS): Don Criqui and Steve Beuerlein
- Box score

Game information

**First quarter**

- IND – Edgerrin James 1-yard run (Mike Vanderjagt kick), 3:42. Colts 7–0. **Drive: 11 plays, 88 yards, 6:22.**

**Second quarter**

- IND – Dallas Clark 31-yard pass from Peyton Manning (Mike Vanderjagt kick), 11:22. Colts 14–0. **Drive: 3 plays, 47 yards, 1:17.**
- HOU – Domanick Williams 8-yard run (Kris Brown kick), 3:15. Colts 14–7. **Drive: 15 plays, 79 yards, 7:52.**
- HOU – Jabar Gaffney 8-yard pass from David Carr (Kris Brown kick), 0:30. Tied 14–14. **Drive: 6 plays, 34 yards, 2:31.**

**Third quarter**

- IND – Edgerrin James 9-yard run (Mike Vanderjagt kick), 11:18. Colts 21–14. **Drive: 7 plays, 65 yards, 3:28.**
- IND – Mike Vanderjagt 36-yard field goal, 0:17. Colts 24–14. **Drive: 18 plays, 66 yards, 7:22.**

**Fourth quarter**

- IND – Marvin Harrison 7-yard pass from Peyton Manning (Mike Vanderjagt kick), 11:38. Colts 31–14. **Drive: 4 plays, 50 yards, 1:39.**
- IND – Montae Reagor 37-yard fumble return (Mike Vanderjagt kick), 8:07. Colts 38–14.
- HOU – Jerome Mathis 89-yard kickoff return (pass failed), 7:56. Colts 38–20.

**Top passers**

- IND – Peyton Manning – 21/27, 237 yards, 2 TD, INT
- HOU – David Carr – 6/9, 48 yards, TD, INT

**Top rushers**

- IND – Edgerrin James – 21 rushes, 139 yards, 2 TD
- HOU – Domanick Williams – 28 rushes, 98 yards, TD

**Top receivers**

- IND – Reggie Wayne – 9 receptions, 89 yards
- HOU – Jabar Gaffney – 4 receptions, 25 yards, TD

==== Week 8: vs. Cleveland Browns ====
Week Eight: Cleveland Browns at Houston Texans – Game summary

Quarter	1	2	3	4	Total
Browns	10	3	0	3	**16**
**Texans**	7	3	3	6	**19**

at Reliant Stadium, Houston, Texas

- Date: October 30
- Game time: 12:00 p.m. CST
- Game attendance: 70,064
- Referee: Bill Leavy
- TV announcers (CBS): Ian Eagle & Solomon Wilcots
- Box score

Game information

**First quarter**

- HOU – Jerome Mathis 34-yard pass from David Carr (Kris Brown kick), 10:55. Texans 7–0. **Drive: 5 plays, 60 yards, 2:27.**
- CLE – Aaron Shea 8-yard pass from Trent Dilfer (Phil Dawson kick), 5:05. Tied 7–7. **Drive: 10 plays, 69 yards, 5:36.**
- CLE – Phil Dawson 28-yard field goal, 0:05. Browns 10–7. **Drive: 9 plays, 44 yards, 4:07.**

**Second quarter**

- CLE – Phil Dawson 29-yard field goal, 4:14. Browns 13–7. **Drive: 5 plays, 55 yards, 1:33.**
- HOU – Kris Brown 38-yard field goal, 0:10. Browns 13–10. **Drive: 12 plays, 40 yards, 3:52.**

**Third quarter**

- HOU – Kris Brown 37-yard field goal, 3:48. Tied 13–13. **Drive: 13 plays, 53 yards, 7:15.**

**Fourth quarter**

- HOU – Kris Brown 35-yard field goal, 14:08. Texans 16–13. **Drive: 7 plays, 15 yards, 3:19.**
- CLE – Phil Dawson 37-yard field goal, 5:06. Tied 16–16. **Drive: 11 plays, 52 yards, 4:25.**
- HOU – Kris Brown 40-yard field goal, 2:45. Texans 19–16. **Drive: 5 plays, 13 yards, 2:06.**

**Top passers**

- CLE – Trent Dilfer – 12/25, 185 yards, TD
- HOU – David Carr – 10/20, 138 yards, TD, INT

**Top rushers**

- CLE – Reuben Droughns – 20 rushes, 99 yards
- HOU – Domanick Williams – 28 rushes, 91 yards

**Top receivers**

- CLE – Antonio Bryant – 4 receptions, 98 yards
- HOU – Jabar Gaffney – 5 receptions, 64 yards

==== Week 9: at Jacksonville Jaguars ====
Week Nine: Houston Texans at Jacksonville Jaguars – Game summary

Quarter	1	2	3	4	Total
Texans	0	7	7	0	**14**
**Jaguars**	0	0	7	14	**21**

at Alltel Stadium, Jacksonville, Florida

- Date: November 6
- Game time: 12:00 p.m. CST / 1:00 p.m. EST
- Game weather: Partly cloudy, 79 °F (26 °C)
- Game attendance: 64,613
- Referee: Gerry Austin
- TV announcers (CBS): Ian Eagle & Solomon Wilcots
- Box score

Game information

**First quarter**

- No scoring plays

**Second quarter**

- HOU – Corey Bradford 31-yard pass from David Carr (Kris Brown kick), 10:18. Texans 7–0. **Drive: 10 plays, 88 yards, 5:19.**

**Third quarter**

- JAX – Ernest Wilford 12-yard pass from Byron Leftwich (Josh Scobee kick), 8:46. Tied 7–7. **Drive: 4 plays, 29 yards, 1:27.**
- HOU – Jonathan Wells 7-yard run (Kris Brown kick), 1:19. Texans 14–7. **Drive: 13 plays, 84 yards, 7:27.**

**Fourth quarter**

- JAX – Byron Leftwich 8-yard run (Josh Scobee kick), 10:48. Tied 14–14. **Drive: 10 plays, 80 yards, 5:31.**
- JAX – Greg Jones 12-yard run (Josh Scobee kick), 2:53. Jaguars 21–14. **Drive: 9 plays, 82 yards, 4:50.**

**Top passers**

- HOU – David Carr – 22/30, 219 yards, TD
- JAX – Byron Leftwich – 19/25, 218 yards, TD

**Top rushers**

- HOU – Jonathan Wells – 13 rushes, 56 yards, TD
- JAX – Fred Taylor – 12 rushes, 48 yards

**Top receivers**

- HOU – Andre Johnson – 9 receptions, 91 yards
- JAX – Ernest Wilford – 4 receptions, 89 yards, TD

==== Week 10: at Indianapolis Colts ====
Week Ten: Houston Texans at Indianapolis Colts – Game summary

Quarter	1	2	3	4	Total
Texans	0	7	10	0	**17**
**Colts**	7	14	7	3	**31**

at RCA Dome, Indianapolis, Indiana

- Date: November 13
- Game time: 12:00 p.m. CST/1:00 p.m. EST
- Game weather: None (played indoors)
- Game attendance: 57,209
- Referee: Peter Morelli
- TV announcers (CBS): Gus Johnson and Steve Tasker
- Box score

Game information

**First quarter**

- IND – Dallas Clark 14-yard pass from Peyton Manning (Mike Vanderjagt kick), 4:29. Colts 7–0. **Drive: 10 plays, 70 yards, 4:48.**

**Second quarter**

- IND – Edgerrin James 5-yard run (Mike Vanderjagt kick), 11:14. Colts 14–0. **Drive: 13 plays, 86 yards, 8:17.**
- IND – Brandon Stokley 21-yard pass from Peyton Manning (Mike Vanderjagt kick), 5:36. Colts 21–0. **Drive: 9 plays, 71 yards, 4:25.**
- HOU – Jonathan Wells 14-yard run (Kris Brown kick), 1:53. Colts 21–7. **Drive: 8 plays, 38 yards, 3:31.**

**Third quarter**

- HOU – Jabar Gaffney 13-yard pass from David Carr (Kris Brown kick), 8:26. Colts 21–14. **Drive: 11 plays, 60 yards, 6:22.**
- IND – Marvin Harrison 30-yard pass from Peyton Manning (Mike Vanderjagt kick), 5:54. Colts 28–14. **Drive: 5 plays, 75 yards, 2:20.**
- HOU – Kris Brown 24-yard field goal, 0:59. Colts 28–17. **Drive: 10 plays, 26 yards, 4:44.**

**Fourth quarter**

- IND – Mike Vanderjagt 45-yard field goal, 11:30. Colts 31–17. **Drive: 12 plays, 40 yards, 4:29.**

**Top passers**

- HOU – David Carr – 16/25, 138 yards, TD
- IND – Peyton Manning – 26/35, 297 yards, 3 TD

**Top rushers**

- HOU – Jonathan Wells – 15 rushes, 58 yards, TD
- IND – Edgerrin James – 26 rushes, 122 yards, TD

**Top receivers**

- HOU – Andre Johnson – 4 receptions, 42 yards
- IND – Marvin Harrison – 7 receptions, 108 yards, TD

==== Week 11: vs. Kansas City Chiefs ====
Week Eleven: Kansas City Chiefs at Houston Texans – Game summary

Quarter	1	2	3	4	Total
**Chiefs**	10	21	0	14	**45**
Texans	7	0	10	0	**17**

at Reliant Stadium, Houston, Texas

- Date: November 20
- Game time: 7:30 p.m. CST
- Game weather: Clear, 58 °F (14 °C) (retractable roof open)
- Game attendance: 70,481
- Referee: Walt Coleman
- TV announcers (ESPN): Mike Patrick, Joe Theismann, Paul Maguire and Suzy Kolber
- Box score

Game information

**First quarter**

- KC – Lawrence Tynes 35-yard field goal, 9:32. Chiefs 3–0. **Drive: 7 plays, 52 yards, 3:55.**
- KC – Larry Johnson 23-yard run (Lawrence Tynes kick), 4:20. Chiefs 10–0. **Drive: 10 plays, 65 yards, 3:56.**
- HOU – Jerome Mathis 99-yard kickoff return (Kris Brown kick), 4:05. Chiefs 10–7.

**Second quarter**

- KC – Eddie Kennison 26-yard pass from Trent Green (Lawrence Tynes kick), 10:14. Chiefs 17–7. **Drive: 4 plays, 71 yards, 1:21.**
- KC – Larry Johnson 1-yard run (Lawrence Tynes kick), 6:23. Chiefs 24–7. **Drive: 5 plays, 43 yards, 2:08.**
- KC – Eric Warfield 57-yard interception return (Lawrence Tynes kick), 0:03. Chiefs 31–7.

**Third quarter**

- HOU – Domanick Williams 3-yard run (Kris Brown kick), 8:54. Chiefs 31–14. **Drive: 6 plays, 37 yards, 2:35.**
- HOU – Kris Brown 22-yard field goal, 0:42. Chiefs 31–17. **Drive: 10 plays, 72 yards, 4:40.**

**Fourth quarter**

- KC – Eddie Kennison 7-yard pass from Trent Green (Lawrence Tynes kick), 8:38. Chiefs 38–17. **Drive: 13 plays, 51 yards, 8:19.**
- KC – Samie Parker 6-yard pass from Trent Green (Lawrence Tynes kick), 4:35. Chiefs 45–17. **Drive: 8 plays, 33 yards, 3:04.**

**Top passers**

- KC – Trent Green – 19/29, 220 yards, 3 TD, INT
- HOU – David Carr – 19/36, 182 yards, INT

**Top rushers**

- KC – Larry Johnson – 36 rushes, 211 yards, 2 TD
- HOU – Domanick Williams – 13 rushes, 57 yards, TD

**Top receivers**

- KC – Tony Gonzalez – 9 receptions, 98 yards
- HOU – Domanick Williams – 3 receptions, 53 yards

==== Week 12: St. Louis Rams ====
Week Twelve: St. Louis Rams at Houston Texans – Game summary

Quarter	1	2	3	4	OT	Total
**Rams**	0	3	7	17	6	**33**
Texans	7	17	0	3	0	**27**

at Reliant Stadium, Houston, Texas

- Date: November 27
- Game time: 1:00 p.m. CST
- Game attendance: 70,010
- Referee: Ed Hochuli
- TV announcers (Fox): Curt Menefee & J.C. Pearson
- Box score

Game information

**First quarter**

- HOU – Andre Johnson 5-yard pass from David Carr (Kris Brown kick), 6:35. Texans 7–0. **Drive: 9 plays, 89 yards, 4:43.**

**Second quarter**

- HOU – Domanick Williams 30-yard pass from David Carr (Kris Brown kick), 11:33. Texans 14–0. **Drive: 11 plays, 67 yards, 9:33.**
- HOU – Kris Brown 39-yard field goal, 4:25. Texans 17–0. **Drive: 11 plays, 44 yards, 5:38.**
- STL – Jeff Wilkins 37-yard field goal, 0:58. Texans 17–3. **Drive: 10 plays, 61 yards, 3:27.**
- HOU – Corey Bradford 10-yard pass from David Carr (Kris Brown kick), 0:20. Texans 24–3. **Drive: 4 plays, 29 yards, 0:16.**

**Third quarter**

- STL – Torry Holt 19-yard pass from Ryan Fitzpatrick (Jeff Wilkins kick), 10:33. Texans 24–10. **Drive: 11 plays, 65 yards, 4:15.**

**Fourth quarter**

- STL – Steven Jackson 1-yard run (Jeff Wilkins kick), 6:37. Texans 24–17. **Drive: 16 plays, 77 yards, 7:21.**
- HOU – Kris Brown 35-yard field goal, 2:49. Texans 27–17. **Drive: 11 plays, 50 yards, 3:35.**
- STL – Isaac Bruce 43-yard pass from Ryan Fitzpatrick (Jeff Wilkins kick), 0:26. Texans 27–24. **Drive: 13 plays, 76 yards, 2:07.**
- STL – Jeff Wilkins 47-yard field goal, 0:04. Tied 27–27. **Drive: 3 plays, 19 yards, 0:14.**

**Overtime**

- STL – Kevin Curtis 56-yard pass from Ryan Fitzpatrick, 8:46. Rams 33–27. **Drive: 6 plays, 90 yards, 2:52.**

**Top passers**

- STL – Ryan Fitzpatrick – 19/30, 310 yards, 3 TD, INT
- HOU – David Carr – 25/34, 293 yards, 3 TD, INT

**Top rushers**

- STL – Steven Jackson – 25 rushes, 110 yards, TD
- HOU – Domanick Williams – 25 rushes, 78 yards

**Top receivers**

- STL – Torry Holt – 10 receptions, 130 yards, TD
- HOU – Andre Johnson – 12 receptions, 159 yards, TD

==== Week 13: at Baltimore Ravens ====
Week Thirteen: Houston Texans at Baltimore Ravens – Game summary

Quarter	1	2	3	4	Total
Texans	3	3	0	9	**15**
**Ravens**	0	7	0	9	**16**

at M&T Bank Stadium, Baltimore, Maryland

- Date: December 4
- Game time: 1:00 p.m. CST
- Game weather: Sunny, 47 °F (8 °C)
- Game attendance: 69,909
- Referee: Terry McAulay
- TV announcers (CBS): Ian Eagle & Solomon Wilcots
- Box score

Game information

**First quarter**

- HOU – Kris Brown 39-yard field goal, 3:43. Texans 3–0. **Drive: 6 plays, 12 yards, 2:01.**

**Second quarter**

- BAL – Kyle Boller 6-yard run (Matt Stover kick), 13:01. Ravens 7–3. **Drive: 12 plays, 83 yards, 5:42.**
- HOU – Kris Brown 26-yard field goal, 0:04. Ravens 7–6. **Drive: 16 plays, 88 yards, 4:38.**

**Third quarter**

- No scoring plays

**Fourth quarter**

- HOU – Kris Brown 22-yard field goal, 14:30. Texans 9–7. **Drive: 10 plays, 25 yards, 4:27.**
- BAL – Adalius Thomas 20-yard interception return (kick failed), 7:16. Ravens 13–9.
- HOU – Kris Brown 29-yard field goal, 3:31. Ravens 13–12. **Drive: 9 plays, 50 yards, 3:45.**
- HOU – Kris Brown 39-yard field goal, 1:08. Texans 15–13. **Drive: 4 plays, 8 yards, 1:34.**
- BAL – Matt Stover 38-yard field goal, 0:06. Ravens 16–15. **Drive: 8 plays, 67 yards, 1:02.**

**Top passers**

- HOU – David Carr – 17/37, 165 yards, INT
- BAL – Kyle Boller – 17/33, 198 yards

**Top rushers**

- HOU – Domanick Williams – 29 rushes, 155 yards
- BAL – Chester Taylor – 11 rushes, 40 yards

**Top receivers**

- HOU – Andre Johnson – 4 receptions, 70 yards
- BAL – Mark Clayton – 7 receptions, 86 yards

==== Week 14: at Tennessee Titans ====
Week Fourteen: Houston Texans at Tennessee Titans – Game summary

Quarter	1	2	3	4	Total
Texans	3	7	0	0	**10**
**Titans**	0	3	7	3	**13**

at The Coliseum

- Date: December 11
- Game time: 1:00 p.m. CST
- Game weather: Cloudy, 43 °F (6 °C)
- Game attendance: 69,149
- Referee: Bernie Kukar
- TV announcers (CBS): Craig Bolerjack & Rich Baldinger
- Box score

Game information

**First quarter**

- HOU – Kris Brown 30-yard field goal, 0:03. Texans 3–0. **Drive: 6 plays, 54 yards, 2:27.**

**Second quarter**

- TEN – Rob Bironas 23-yard field goal, 4:28. Tied 3–3. **Drive: 7 plays, 70 yards, 2:55.**
- HOU – Domanick Williams 3-yard pass from David Carr (Kris Brown kick), 0:19. Texans 10–3. **Drive: 9 plays, 72 yards, 1:26.**

**Third quarter**

- TEN – Adam Jones 52-yard punt return (Rob Bironas kick), 3:07. Tied 10–10.

**Fourth quarter**

- TEN – Rob Bironas 21-yard field goal, 0:10. Titans 13–10. **Drive: 10 plays, 70 yards, 3:37.**

**Top passers**

- HOU – David Carr – 17/26, 116 yards, TD
- TEN – Steve McNair – 18/30, 208 yards

**Top rushers**

- HOU – Domanick Williams – 22 rushes, 139 yards
- TEN – Chris Brown – 16 rushes, 53 yards

**Top receivers**

- HOU – Domanick Williams – 7 receptions, 50 yards, TD
- TEN – Chris Brown – 3 receptions, 54 yards

==== Week 15: vs. Arizona Cardinals ====
Week Fifteen: Arizona Cardinals at Houston Texans – Game summary

Quarter	1	2	3	4	Total
Cardinals	3	7	0	9	**19**
**Texans**	0	24	3	3	**30**

at Reliant Stadium, Houston, Texas

- Date: December 18
- Game time: 1:00 p.m. CST
- Game weather: None (retractable roof closed)
- Game attendance: 70,024
- Referee: Bill Vonovich
- TV announcers (Fox): Chris Myers, Terry Donahue & Kevin McCabe
- Box score

Game information

**First quarter**

- ARI – Neil Rackers 26-yard field goal, 3:43. Cardinals 3–0. **Drive: 12 plays, 42 yards, 6:44.**

**Second quarter**

- HOU – Jonathan Wells 7-yard run (Kris Brown kick), 14:23. Texans 7–3. **Drive: 9 plays, 46 yards, 10:52.**
- ARI – Anquan Boldin 20-yard pass from Kurt Warner (Neil Rackers kick), 10:16. Cardinals 10–7. **Drive: 7 plays, 81 yards, 3:54.**
- HOU – Vernand Morency 25-yard run (Kris Brown kick), 4:57. Texans 14–10. **Drive: 10 plays, 23 yards, 5:05.**
- HOU –Jonathan Wells 3-yard run (Kris Brown kick), 1:50. Texans 21–10. **Drive: 9 plays, 44 yards, 2:52.**
- HOU – Kris Brown 27-yard field goal, 0:08. Texans 24–10. **Drive: 8 plays, 29 yards, 1:06.**

**Third quarter**

- HOU – Kris Brown 41-yard field goal, 12:13. Texans 27–10. **Drive: 8 plays, 37 yards, 2:26.**

**Fourth quarter**

- ARI – Neil Rackers 42-yard field goal, 14:46. Texans 27–13. **Drive: 7 plays, 26 yards, 1:52.**
- ARI – Larry Fitzgerald 12-yard pass from John Navarre (kick failed), 5:32. Texans 27–19. **Drive: 7 plays, 58 yards, 3:10.**
- HOU – Kris Brown 26-yard field goal, 0:27. Texans 30–19. **Drive: 4 plays, 6 yards, 2:04.**

**Top passers**

- ARI – John Navarre – 14/24, 174 yards, TD, INT
- HOU – David Carr – 22/33, 150 yards, INT

**Top rushers**

- ARI – Marcel Shipp – 6 rushes, 28 yards
- HOU – Jonathan Wells – 28 rushes, 87 yards, 2 TD

**Top receivers**

- ARI – Anquan Boldin – 8 receptions, 134 yards, TD
- HOU – Andre Johnson – 7 receptions, 51 yards

==== Week 16: vs. Jacksonville Jaguars ====
Week Sixteen: Jacksonville Jaguars at Houston Texans – Game summary

Quarter	1	2	3	4	Total
**Jaguars**	7	3	7	21	**38**
Texans	3	10	0	7	**20**

at Reliant Stadium, Houston, Texas

- Date: December 24
- Game time: 1:00 p.m. CST
- Game attendance: 70,025
- Referee: Tony Corrente
- TV announcers (CBS): Bill Macatee & Rich Gannon
- Box score

Game information

**First quarter**

- JAX – LaBrandon Toefield 1-yard run (Josh Scobee kick), 6:02. Jaguars 7–0. **Drive: 13 plays, 64 yards, 6:53.**
- HOU – Kris Brown 37-yard field goal, 2:21. Jaguars 7–3. **Drive: 8 plays, 61 yards, 3:35.**

**Second quarter**

- HOU – Corey Bradford 50-yard pass from David Carr (Kris Brown kick), 11:43. Texans 10–7. **Drive: 7 plays, 69 yards, 2:17.**
- JAX – Josh Scobee 26-yard field goal, 4:35. Tied 10–10. **Drive: 15 plays, 74 yards, 6:57.**
- HOU – Kris Brown 53-yard field goal, 1:03. Texans 13–10. **Drive: 10 plays, 41 yards, 3:22.**

**Third quarter**

- JAX – LaBrandon Toefield 2-yard run (Josh Scobee kick), 4:03. Jaguars 17–13. **Drive: 8 plays, 63 yards, 3:24.**

**Fourth quarter**

- HOU – Andre Johnson 53-yard pass from David Carr (Kris Brown kick), 12:15. Texans 20–17. **Drive: 3 plays, 66 yards, 1:10.**
- JAX – Fred Taylor 15-yard run (Josh Scobee kick), 9:16. Jaguars 24–20. **Drive: 7 plays, 66 yards, 2:45.**
- JAX – Ernest Wilford 36-yard pass from David Garrard (Josh Scobee kick), 2:37. Jaguars 31–20. **Drive: 7 plays, 62 yards, 3:20.**
- JAX – LaBrandon Toefield 17-yard run (Josh Scobee kick), 1:51. Jaguars 38–20. **Drive: 2 plays, 21 yards, 0:12.**

**Top passers**

- JAX – David Garrard – 18/31, 292 yards, TD
- HOU – David Carr – 19/29, 295 yards, 2 TD, INT

**Top rushers**

- JAX – Fred Taylor – 22 rushes, 101 yards, TD
- HOU – Jonathan Wells – 21 rushes, 86 yards

**Top receivers**

- JAX – Ernest Wilford – 4 receptions, 118 yards, TD
- HOU – Andre Johnson – 7 receptions, 119 yards, TD

==== Week 17: at San Francisco 49ers ====
Week Seventeen: Houston Texans at San Francisco 49ers – Game summary

Quarter	1	2	3	4	OT	Total
Texans	10	0	7	0	0	**17**
**49ers**	0	7	10	0	3	**20**

at Monster Park, San Francisco, California

- Date: January 1, 2006
- Game time: 3:05 p.m. CST/1:05 p.m. PST
- Game weather: Cloudy, 59 °F (15 °C)
- Game attendance: 67,970
- Referee: Bill Leavy
- TV announcers (CBS): Bill Macatee and Rich Gannon
- Box score

Game information

**First quarter**

- HOU – Kris Brown 21-yard field goal, 9:14. Texans 3–0. **Drive: 6 plays, 18 yards, 1:47.**
- HOU – Vernand Morency 3-yard run (Kris Brown kick), 4:43. Texans 10–0. **Drive: 5 plays, 17 yards, 2:18.**

**Second quarter**

- SF – Brandon Lloyd 14-yard pass from Alex Smith (Joe Nedney kick), 0:18. Texans 10–7. **Drive: 15 plays, 76 yards, 7:34.**

**Third quarter**

- SF – Joe Nedney 42-yard field goal, 7:33. Tied 10–10. **Drive: 14 plays, 64 yards, 7:22.**
- HOU – Corey Bradford 25-yard pass from Tony Banks (Kris Brown kick), 5:50. Texans 17–10. **Drive: 4 plays, 62 yards, 1:29.**
- SF – Mike Adams 40-yard interception return (Joe Nedney kick), 0:10. Tied 17–17.

**Fourth quarter**

- No scoring plays

**Overtime**

- SF – Joe Nedney 33-yard field goal, 3:52. 49ers 20–17. **Drive: 3 plays, 6 yards, 1:18.**

**Top passers**

- HOU – Tony Banks – 14/25, 173 yards, TD, 2 INT
- SF – Alex Smith – 16/29, 159 yards, TD, INT

**Top rushers**

- HOU – Vernand Morency – 21 rushes, 83 yards, TD
- SF – Frank Gore – 25 rushes, 108 yards

**Top receivers**

- HOU – Corey Bradford – 2 receptions, 56 yards, TD
- SF – Arnaz Battle – 3 receptions, 52 yards

=== Standings ===
AFC South
	W	L	T	PCT	DIV	CONF	PF	PA	STK
^{(1)} Indianapolis Colts	14	2	0	.875	6–0	11–1	439	247	W1
^{(5)} Jacksonville Jaguars	12	4	0	.750	4–2	9–3	361	269	W3
Tennessee Titans	4	12	0	.250	2–4	3–9	299	421	L3
Houston Texans	2	14	0	.125	0–6	1–11	260	431	L2

== Statistics ==
=== Team ===
Category	Total yards	Yards per game	NFL rank (out of 32)
Passing offense	2,237	139.8	30th
Rushing offense	1,816	113.5	15th
Total offense	4,053	253.3	30th
Passing defense	3,521	220.1	24th
Rushing defense	2,303	143.9	32nd
Total defense	5,824	364.0	31st

=== Individual ===
Category	Player	Total
Offense
Passing yards	David Carr	2,488
Passing touchdowns	David Carr	14
Rushing yards	Domanick Williams	976
Rushing touchdowns	Jonathan Wells	4
Receiving yards	Andre Johnson	688
Receiving touchdowns	Corey Bradford	5
Defense
Tackles (Solo)	Morlon Greenwood	82
Sacks	Shantee Orr	7
Interceptions	Glenn Earl	2
