= Shantee Orr =

American football player (born 1981)

No. 53, 51
- Position: Linebacker

Personal information
- Born: May 28, 1981 (age 45); Detroit, Michigan, U.S.
- Listed height: 6 ft 1 in (1.85 m)
- Listed weight: 246 lb (112 kg)

Career information
- High school: Edwin Denby (Detroit)
- College: Michigan
- NFL draft: 2003: undrafted

Career history
- Green Bay Packers (2003)*; Houston Texans (2003–2007); Jacksonville Jaguars (2007); Cleveland Browns (2008)
- * Offseason or practice squad member only

Awards and highlights
- Second-team All-Big Ten (2001)

Career NFL statistics
- Total tackles: 113
- Sacks: 10.5
- Forced fumbles: 4
- Fumble recoveries: 3
- Pass deflections: 5
- Stats at Pro Football Reference

Shantee De'Shjuan Orr (born May 28, 1981) is an American former professional football player who was a linebacker in the National Football League (NFL). He played college football for the Michigan Wolverines and was signed by the Green Bay Packers as an undrafted free agent in 2003.

Orr was also a member of the Houston Texans, Jacksonville Jaguars and the Cleveland Browns.

== Early life ==
Orr graduated from Denby Technical & Prep. H.S. in June 1999. He was a member of the National Honors Society. In football, he earned All-State and USA Today Honorable Mention All-America Honors as a senior. He also ranked number one in state as a Linebacker. In his senior year he played linebacker, guard, quarterback, tight end and punter... He also lettered in baseball and track, winning All-City in the discuss and shot put during his senior campaign.

== College career ==
Orr played college football at the University of Michigan, and was a starter for three seasons starting 23 of 35 career games at defensive end. He finished his career with 79 tackles, 13 sacks, nine passes defended and three forced fumbles. As a redshirt junior, he registered 24 tackles and 6 sacks... He collected a career-high 35 tackles and 6 sacks as a redshirt sophomore... He also recorded 20 tackles and 1 sack in 2000 as a redshirt freshman in 1999. He majored in Movement Science and received his Bachelor’s degree in Kinesiology.

== Professional career ==
=== Green Bay Packers ===
After going undrafted in the 2003 NFL draft, Orr signed with the Green Bay Packers on May 2, 2003. On July 29, 2003, he was waived by the Packers.

=== Houston Texans ===
Orr was claimed by the Houston Texans on July 30, 2003. He appeared in six games that season and made his NFL debut at the Buffalo Bills on November 16 notching his first sack in the NFL. In 2004, Orr played in four games mainly on special teams. In 2005, A determined Orr battled his way into the starting lineup playing in all 16 games and starting 12 of them at OLB. He amassed 47 tackles and led the Houston Texans with seven and a half sacks. In one game vs. the Baltimore he set a team record of 3 sacks in one game. In 2006, Orr played in all 16 games starting 14 of the contests. He ended the year with 27 tackles and 1.5 sacks. In 2007, Orr began the 2007 season with the Houston Texans appearing in six games and starting one. He was waived on November 28.

=== Jacksonville Jaguars ===
Orr was signed Jacksonville Jaguars on December 12 and played in three games making three tackles; and contributed on special teams. He finished the 2007 season off by going to his first two playoff games.

=== Cleveland Browns ===
On March 21, Orr signed with the Cleveland Browns. He was released by the team on August 30 during final cuts. However, he was re-signed by the team on September 4 after linebacker Antwan Peek was injured in practice and placed on injured reserve. After his season in Cleveland, Orr retired after 6 years of professional football.

== NFL career statistics ==
Legend
**Bold**	Career high

Year	Team	Games		Tackles					Interceptions					Fumbles			
Year	Team	GP	GS	Cmb	Solo	Ast	Sck	TFL	Int	Yds	TD	Lng	PD	FF	FR	Yds	TD
2003	HOU	6	0	7	4	3	2.0	2	0	0	0	0	**2**	0	**1**	-1	0
2004	HOU	4	0	2	2	0	0.0	0	0	0	0	0	0	0	**1**	3	0
2005	HOU	**16**	**12**	**50**	**38**	**12**	**7.0**	**6**	0	0	0	0	**2**	**4**	0	0	0
2006	HOU	**16**	11	32	28	4	1.5	3	0	0	0	0	1	0	**1**	**19**	0
2007	HOU	5	2	8	6	2	0.0	2	0	0	0	0	0	0	0	0	0
2007	JAX	3	0	4	4	0	0.0	0	0	0	0	0	0	0	0	0	0
2008	CLE	15	0	10	8	2	0.0	0	0	0	0	0	0	0	0	0	0
		65	25	113	90	23	10.5	13	0	0	0	0	5	4	3	21	0
