= Drew Hodgdon =

American football player (born 1981)

No. 63, 55, 57
- Positions: Center, guard

Personal information
- Born: November 15, 1981 (age 44); Palo Alto, California, U.S.
- Listed height: 6 ft 3 in (1.91 m)
- Listed weight: 291 lb (132 kg)

Career information
- High school: Palo Alto (Palo Alto, California)
- College: Arizona State
- NFL draft: 2005: 5th round, 151st overall pick

Career history
- Houston Texans (2005–2007)

Career NFL statistics
- Games played: 14
- Games started: 8
- Stats at Pro Football Reference

Lincoln Andrew Hodgdon (born November 15, 1981) is an American former professional football player who was an offensive lineman for the Houston Texans of the National Football League (NFL). He played college football for the Arizona State Sun Devils.

== Early life ==
Hodgdon was born in Palo Alto, California. He attended Junípero Serra High School in San Mateo, before transferring and graduating from Palo Alto High School in 2000, where he excelled in football, wrestling and track and field.

== College career ==
He chose to attend Arizona State University. With the Sun Devils, he played in 45 career games with 34 starts at both center and guard.

== Professional career ==
He was selected by the Texans in the fifth round (151st overall) of the 2005 NFL draft. He saw action in four games during his rookie season, starting three, before being placed on the injured reserve list. He increased his playing time in his second season, when he saw action in eight games and started in five. He was released just before the 2007 season, but was re-signed on December 4, 2007. Some time after, he was released once more. He was a guest on a Houston radio station in November 2013, where he talked about football and cycling.
