= Chris McKenzie =

American gridiron football player (born 1982)

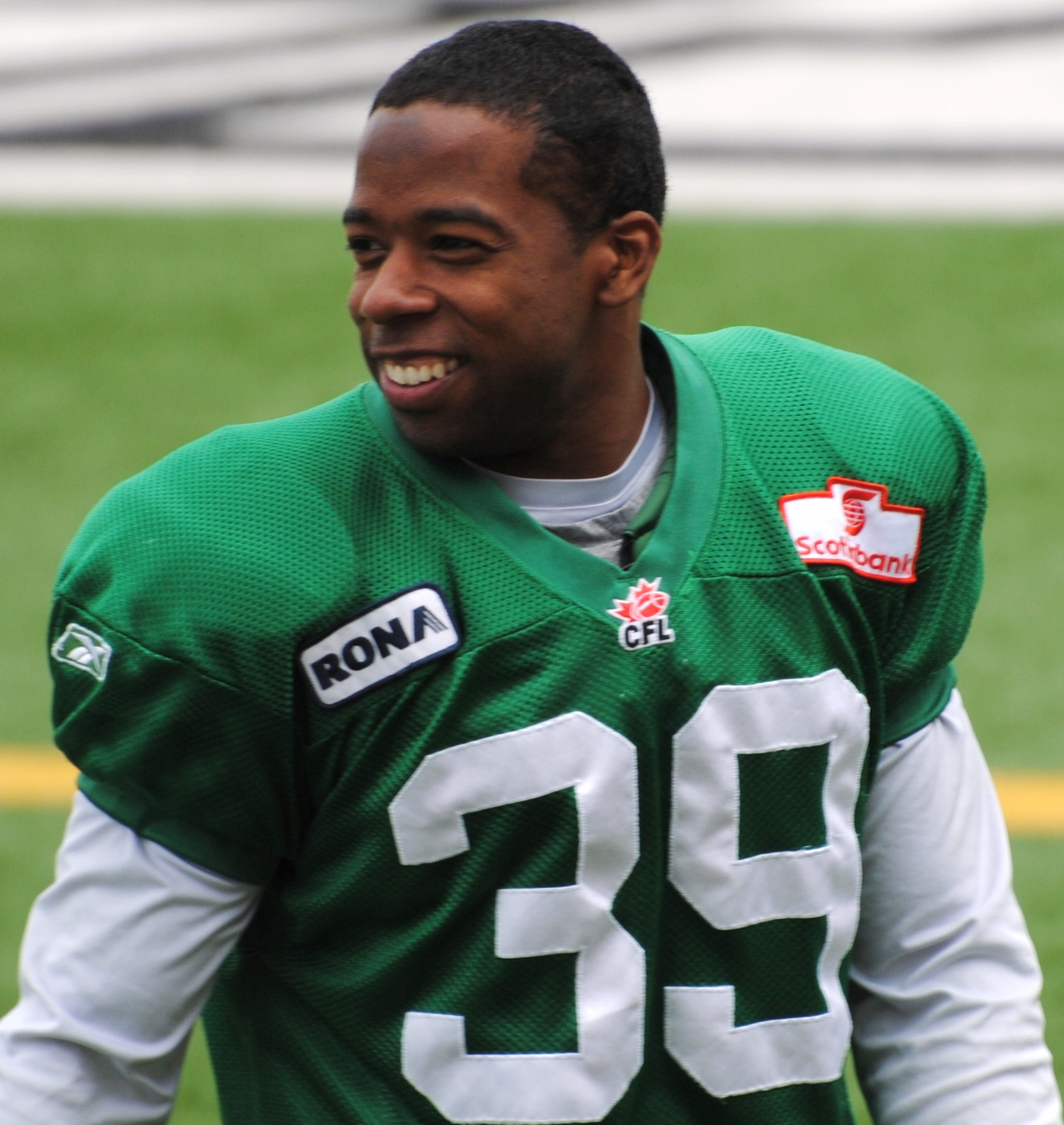

No. 39
- Position: Defensive back

Personal information
- Born: March 17, 1982 (age 44); New York, New York, U.S.
- Listed height: 5 ft 9 in (1.75 m)
- Listed weight: 180 lb (82 kg)

Career information
- College: Arizona State
- NFL draft: 2005: undrafted

Career history
- 2005–2006: Houston Texans
- 2007–2008: Arizona Rattlers
- 2009–2012: Saskatchewan Roughriders
- Stats at Pro Football Reference
- Stats at ArenaFan.com

Chris McKenzie (born March 17, 1982) is an American former professional football cornerback. He was signed as an undrafted free agent by the Houston Texans in 2005. He played college football for the Arizona State Sun Devils. Before joining the Sun Devils, McKenzie played at Glendale Community College.

== Football career ==
=== Amateur ===
After obtaining his high school equivalency, McKenzie began looking for a junior college where he could play football, eventually settling on Glendale Community College in Arizona. McKenzie played two seasons for the Gauchos, and finished his junior college career as the 46th best prospect in the country at his level. During his time at Glendale, McKenzie was named the team's Defensive MVP in his sophomore season, was named a first-team All-American by the National Junior College Athletic Association (NJCAA) and was listed as one of the top junior college prospects by SuperPrep Magazine and JC Gridwire.

McKenzie chose to attend Arizona State University after exhausting his junior college eligibility. He played two seasons for the Sun Devils, seeing action in all 24 games and starting 20. At both Glendale and Arizona State, McKenzie was considered one of the fastest players on the team.

On March 18, 2015, McKenzie signed a one-day contract with the Saskatchewan Roughriders and retired as a Rider, where he spent most of his professional career.
