= Jerome Mathis =

American football player (born 1983)

No. 13
- Position: Wide receiver

Personal information
- Born: July 26, 1983 (age 43); Petersburg, Virginia, U.S.
- Listed height: 5 ft 11 in (1.80 m)
- Listed weight: 184 lb (83 kg)

Career information
- High school: Petersburg
- College: Hampton
- NFL draft: 2005: 4th round, 114th overall pick

Career history
- Houston Texans (2005–2007); Washington Redskins (2008)*; Toronto Argonauts (2009); Hartford Colonials (2010)*; Pittsburgh Power (2011)
- * Offseason or practice squad member only

Awards and highlights
- First-team All-Pro (2005); Pro Bowl (2005); NFL Alumni Special Teams Player of the Year (2005); PFWA All-Rookie Team (2005)

Career NFL statistics
- Receptions: 6
- Receiving yards: 80
- Receiving touchdowns: 1
- Return yards: 2,122
- Return touchdowns: 3
- Stats at Pro Football Reference

Jerome Alvon Mathis (born July 26, 1983) is an American former professional football player who was a wide receiver and kick returner in the National Football League (NFL). He was selected by the Houston Texans in the fourth round of the 2005 NFL draft. He earned a Pro Bowl selection and was an All-Pro with the Texans in 2005. He also played in the Canadian Football League (NFL) and Arena Football League (AFL).

== Early life ==
Mathis attended Petersburg High School in Petersburg, where he was an all-state, all-district and all-metro wide receiver and kick returner.

=== Track and field ===
Mathis left high school as a six time state champion in track, winning the 2001 national indoor 200 meter title, and setting the 7th fastest time in the nation with 21.79 seconds, at the Nike Classic. He also set the joint 5th fastest 55 metres time in the nation that year with 6.29 seconds, faster than Tyson Gay, and the 2nd fastest 300 meter indoor time with 34.03 seconds.

Mathis also competed in the long jump, posting a personal best of 7.50 meters at Landover, Maryland in 2003.

Personal bests

Event	Time (seconds)	Venue	Date
60 meters	6.93	Landover, Idaho	January 4, 2003
100 meters	10.49	Orlando, Florida	May 8, 2003
200 meters	20.32	Gainesville, Florida	May 29, 2004
400 meters	46.06	University Park, Virginia	January 31, 2004

Event	Mark (meters)	Venue	Date
Long Jump	7.50	Landover, Maryland	February 22, 2003

== College career ==
Mathis holds the NCAA record for career kick return average, breaking the record set by John Taylor of Delaware State University, with an average of 26.6 yards per return. He also holds the NCAA record for career kickoff returns for a touchdown with six.

== Professional career ==
=== Pre-draft ===
Pre-draft measurables
Height	Weight	40-yard dash	10-yard split	20-yard split	Vertical jump	Broad jump
5 ft 11 1/4 in (1.81 m)	181 lb (82 kg)	4.26 s	1.56 s	2.56 s	35.5 in (0.90 m)	10 ft 3 in (3.12 m)
All values from NFL Combine

Mathis recorded the fourth fastest 40-yard dash time (4.26 seconds) ever at the NFL Combine, which was broken by Chris Johnson in 2008, John Ross in 2017, and Xavier Worthy in 2024. His time was tied by Dri Archer in 2014.

=== Houston Texans ===
In his rookie season with the Texans, he was selected to the Pro Bowl for the AFC to be their starter as a kick returner. He was one of three rookies (Shawne Merriman, linebacker, of the San Diego Chargers and Lofa Tatupu, linebacker, of the Seattle Seahawks, being the others) selected to be participants in the game.

Mathis fractured his left foot in January 2006 during the Pro Bowl, but it wasn't discovered until OTA's months later. He was expected to miss only four months, but instead missed six months. He returned to practice in November 2006 after missing the first nine games of the season. He was later placed on Injured Reserve. Mathis then played in only three games in 2007 even returning one kick for a touchdown before once again being place on Injured Reserve.

Mathis was a restricted free agent following the 2007 season; the Texans declined to offer him another contract.

=== Washington Redskins ===
On April 4, 2008, Mathis was signed by the Washington Redskins. He was waived by the team on May 15.

=== Toronto Argonauts ===
Mathis signed with the Toronto Argonauts of the Canadian Football League on May 11, 2009, and was hoped to replace the loss of Dominique Dorsey to the NFL as kick returner on special teams but was hampered by injuries and cut at the end of training camp. He was re-signed on September 17. On November 6, 2009, Mathis was released by the Argonauts.

=== Pittsburgh Power ===
Mathis signed with the Pittsburgh Power of the Arena Football League on January 4, 2011. Mathis had a career game on June 11, 2011, against the Tampa Bay Storm, setting new Power single-game franchise records for yards receiving (195), longest reception (46 yards), and longest kick return (57 yards). He also tied Mike Washington's single-game franchise record with 12 receptions and had the first kick return touchdown in Power history. Mathis played in 9 games for the Power, catching 30 passes for 418 yards and 7 touchdowns. He also returned 31 kickoffs for 688 yards and 1 touchdown.

=== NFL statistics ===
Career statistics			Receiving				
Year	Team	G	Rec	Yards	Y/R	TD	LNG
2005	Houston Texans	12	5	65	13.0	1	34
2006	Houston Texans	2	0	0	0	0	0
2007	Houston Texans	3	1	15	15.0	0	15
Total		17	6	80	13.3	1	34

Career statistics			Returning											
Year	Team	G	KR	Yards	Y/R	FC	TD	LNG	PR	Yards	Y/R	FC	TD	LNG
2005	Houston Texans	12	54	1,542	28.6	0	2	99	12	68	5.7	0	0	19
2006	Houston Texans	2	7	192	27.4	0	0	87	0	0	0	0	0	0
2007	Houston Texans	3	11	320	29.0	0	1	84	0	0	0	0	0	0
Total		17	72	2,154	28.5	0	3	99	12	68	5.7	0	0	19

== Legal troubles ==
In December 2007, Mathis was issued a misdemeanor citation for loose dogs after his neighbors complained that they were harassed by his escaped pit bulls. Mathis allowed the dogs to remain loose and kept unvaccinated animals. Officers captured one dog and three puppies near Mathis's Manvel home. No injuries were reported.

Mathis was arrested on February 19, 2008, following a domestic violence incident, but the charges were dropped.
