= Vernand Morency =

American football player (born 1980)

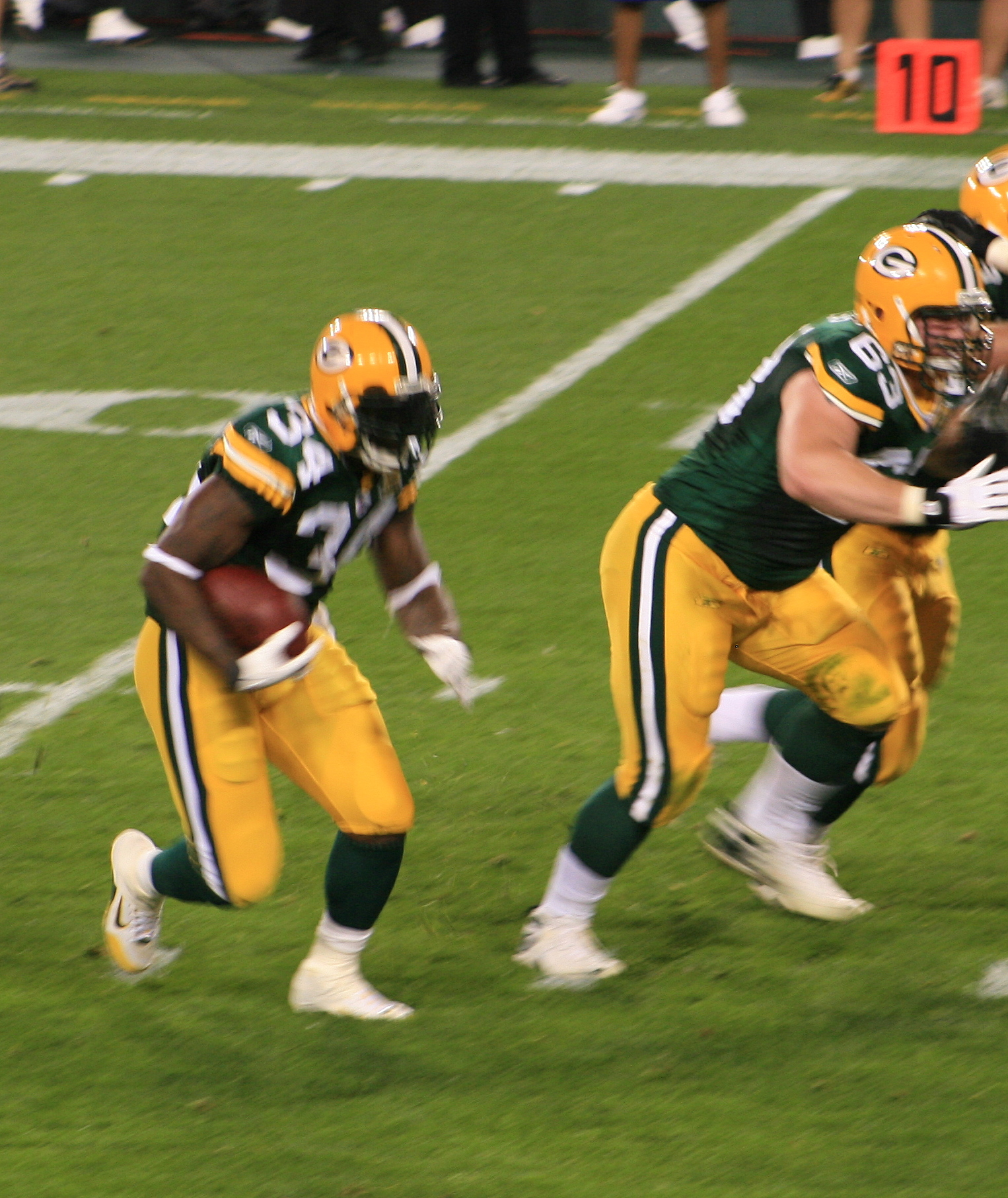
- Morency with the Green Bay Packers in 2007

No. 34
- Position: Running back

Personal information
- Born: February 4, 1980 (age 46); Miami, Florida, U.S.
- Listed height: 5 ft 10 in (1.78 m)
- Listed weight: 212 lb (96 kg)

Career information
- High school: Miami Northwestern
- College: Oklahoma State (2002–2004)
- NFL draft: 2005: 3rd round, 73rd overall pick

Career history
- Houston Texans (2005–2006); Green Bay Packers (2006–2007)

Awards and highlights
- Second-team All-Big 12 (2004)

Career NFL statistics
- Rushing attempts: 171
- Rushing yards: 726
- Receptions: 57
- Receiving yards: 404
- Return yards: 1,107
- Total touchdowns: 4
- Stats at Pro Football Reference

Vernand Morency (born February 4, 1980) is an American former professional football player who was a running back in the National Football League (NFL). He played college football for the Oklahoma State Cowboys and was selected by the Houston Texans in the third round of the 2005 NFL draft. He also played for the Green Bay Packers.

== Early life ==
Vernand Morency grew up in Miami, Florida to immigrants from Haiti.

While attending Northwestern High School in Miami, Florida, Morency was a four-year letterman in baseball and a two-year letterman in football, and won All-America honors in both sports. As a senior football running back, he gained over 1,500 all-purpose yards and scored 15 touchdowns.

== Professional baseball career ==
Morency was a 14th round pick (420th overall) of the Colorado Rockies in 1998. He spent four seasons as a center fielder in the Rockies’ minor league system before enrolling at Oklahoma State in 2002.

== College football career ==
Morency attended Oklahoma State University and finished his career with 451 rushing attempts for 2,661 yards (5.9 yards per rush attempt avg.), 23 touchdowns, 11 receptions for 119 yards (10.8 yards per rec. avg.), and returned ten kickoffs for 224 yards (22.4 yards per kick ret. avg.). Morency's junior season in 2004 was his breakout season. In 2004, he rushed for 1,474 yards and 12 touchdowns. He also had one receiving touchdown. Morency was the recipient of the prestigious Thurman Thomas Award for being the most outstanding offensive player in the 2004 season. He decided to forgo his senior year at OSU and declared for the NFL draft on January 3, 2005.

== Professional football career ==
=== Houston Texans ===
Morency was selected in the third round of the 2005 NFL draft by the Houston Texans with the 73rd overall pick. He was the second-string running back behind Domanick Davis for the team in 2005, rushing 46 times for 184 yards and 2 touchdowns. He also returned 20 kicks for 437 yards and caught 10 passes for 87 yards.

=== Green Bay Packers ===
After the first week of the 2006 NFL season, Morency was traded to the Green Bay Packers for running back Samkon Gado. He spent the 2006 season as the Packers' short yardage back, playing behind Ahman Green. Morency's best game of the 2006 season came against the Arizona Cardinals, where he rushed for 101 yards. On April 4, 2008, the Packers re-signed him to a one-year, $927,000 contract. On August 30, 2008, he was released from the Packers.

== Career stats ==
=== Regular season ===
	Year	Rushing							Receiving				
Team	Year	Games	GS	Att	Yds	Avg	Lg	TD	Rec	Yds	Avg	Lg	Td
Hou	2005	12	1	46	184	4.0	25	2	10	87	8.7	16	0
GB	2006	14	2	96	434	4.5	39	2	17	118	6.9	29	0
	Career	26	3	142	618	4.4	39	4	27	205	7.6	29	0

== Personal life ==
Morency worked in his family real estate business from the age of five. In 2006–2007, he was part of a syndicate group led by T Boone Pickens to develop the Boone Pickens Stadium at his alma mater, Oklahoma State University. In 2007 and 2008, Morency was twice competitively selected to participate in the NFL Business Management and Entrepreneurship Program at the University of Pennsylvania's Wharton School.

Morency invests, owns and manages properties across the country and is involved in several different non-profit initiatives, including work with Wisconsin governor Jim Doyle and his Wisconsin Covenant initiative promising all eighth-graders affordable higher education upon academic success.

== Infamous Signature ==
Morency has achieved internet fame in the sports card collecting community for what is widely considered the lowest effort or "worst" autograph in sports card history.

Instead of writing out his name, the former NFL running back signed his 2005 rookie cards with a single, literal checkmark (✓).

Ironically, because the signature is so notoriously bad, it has become a popular joke item. Enthusiasts frequently seek out his 2005 rookie cards from brands like Upper Deck and Playoff Donruss just to own a piece of trading card infamy.
