= 2006 Pro Bowl =

National Football League all-star game

2006 NFL Pro Bowl
AFC	NFC
17	23
Head coach: Mike Shanahan (Denver Broncos)	Head coach: John Fox (Carolina Panthers)
	1	2	3	4	Total
AFC	7	3	0	7	17
NFC	0	10	7	6	23
- Date: February 12, 2006
- Stadium: Aloha Stadium; Honolulu, Hawaii
- MVP: Derrick Brooks (Tampa Bay Buccaneers)
- Referee: Gerald Austin
- Attendance: 50,190

Ceremonies
- National anthem: JoJo
- Coin toss: Governor of Hawaii Linda Lingle
- Halftime show: Backstreet Boys

TV in the United States
- Network: ESPN
- Announcers: Mike Patrick, Joe Theismann, Paul Maguire, Suzy Kolber, and Michele Tafoya

The 2006 Pro Bowl was the National Football League's all-star game for the 2005 season. The game was played on February 12, 2006, at Aloha Stadium in Honolulu, Hawaii. It marked the 27th consecutive time that the National Football League's all-star game was held in Honolulu. The NFC all-stars won by the score of 23 to 17.

== Game summary ==
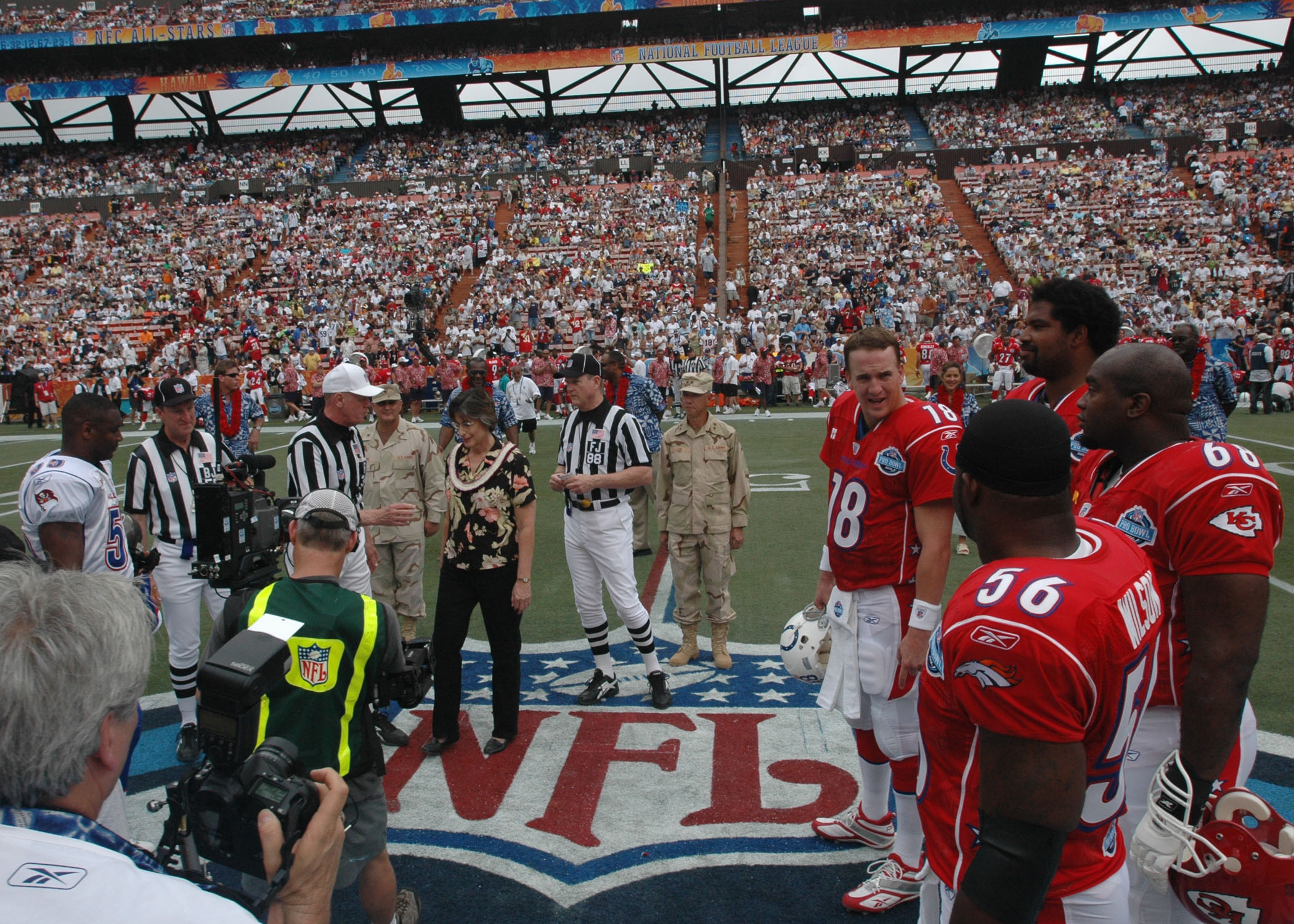
The coin toss before the game with Derrick Brooks (left) representing the NFC and Peyton Manning, Al Wilson, Jonathan Ogden and Will Shields representing the AFC

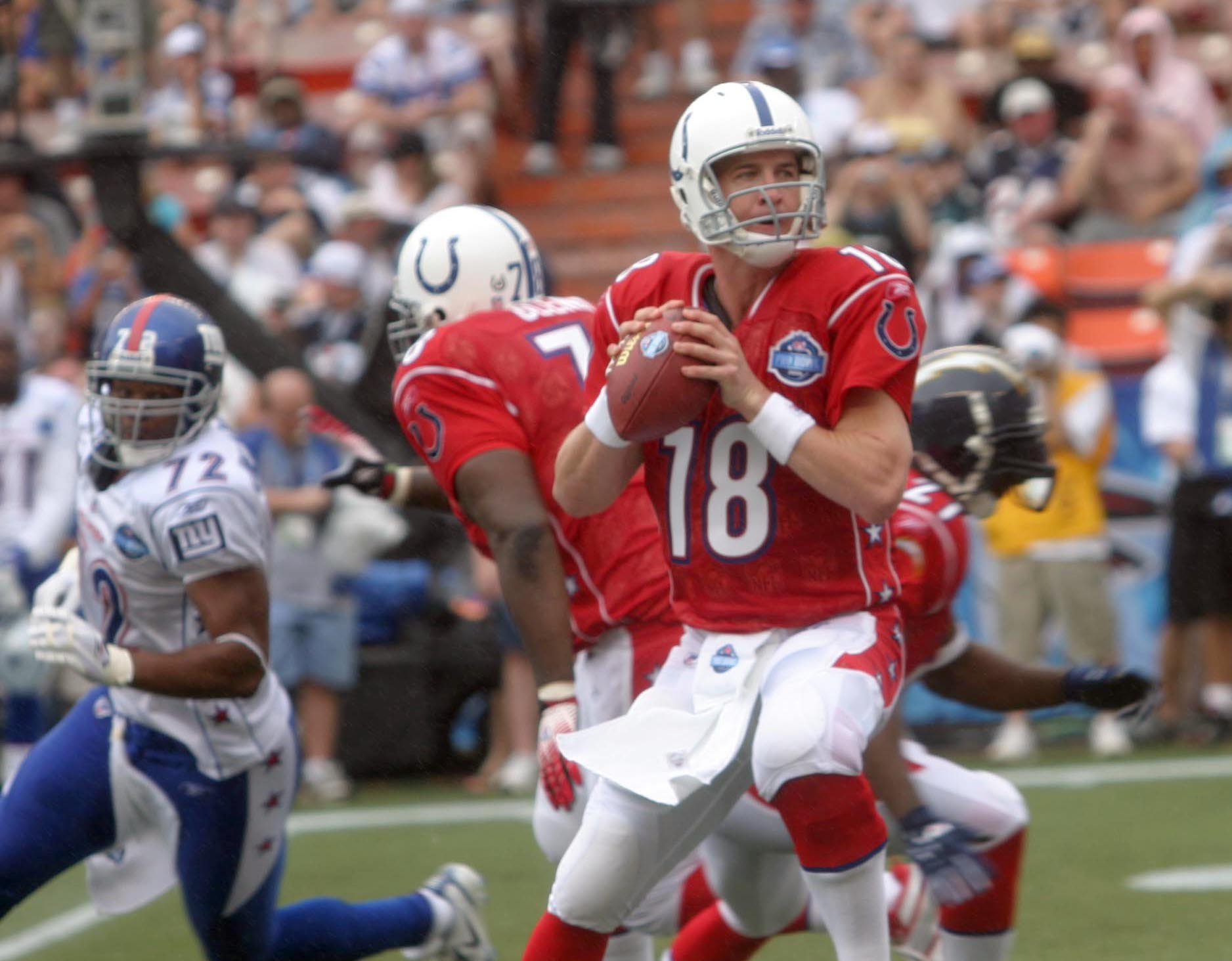
AFC quarterback Peyton Manning was intercepted 3 times in the first half.

The start of the game was interrupted by a surprise rainstorm that lasted through the first quarter, although it ended midway through the second. Both teams' first possessions were punted away, and each of their second drives ended in interceptions; the Chicago Bears' Nathan Vasher intercepted Peyton Manning, then John Lynch picked off Matt Hasselbeck. The AFC scored first on their next drive, culminating with a 16-yard touchdown pass from Manning to Chris Chambers. After the teams traded punts, Michael Vick took over for the NFC in the second quarter, and led the team to the AFC 15-yard line, where Neil Rackers kicked a 32-yarder to make it 7–3. Manning led the AFC right back down the field, and Shayne Graham's 31-yard field goal increased the AFC's lead.

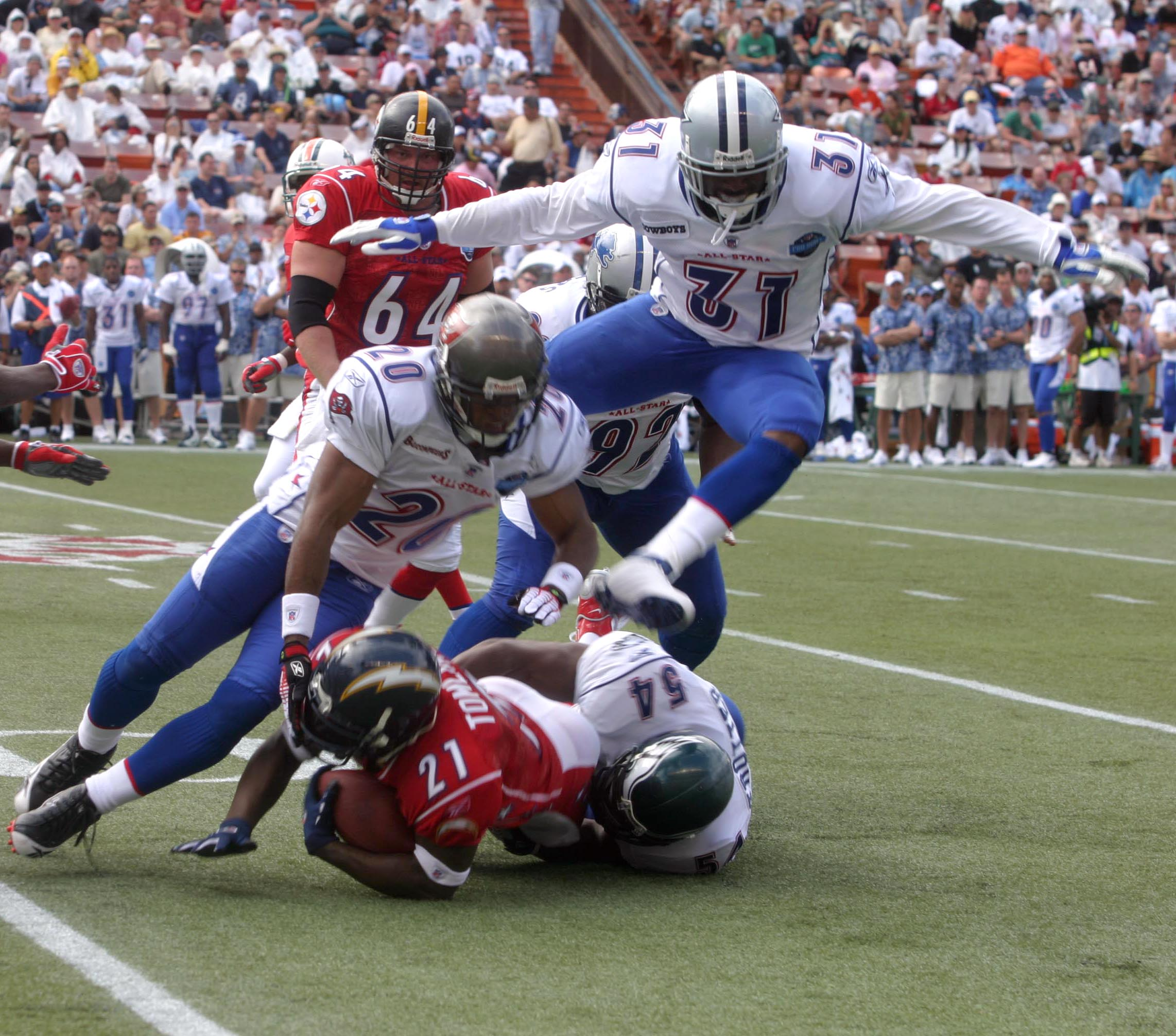
Jeremiah Trotter tackles LaDainian Tomlinson during the game.

On the NFC's next drive, Champ Bailey intercepted Vick for the AFC's second turnover (both interceptions came off passes intended for Steve Smith). However, the NFC's defense responded with another interception; this time, Darren Sharper returned the interception 35 yards to the AFC's 32-yard line. The NFC was forced to punt it away on their next drive, however there was some controversy on the return. Jerome Mathis was set to receive the punt deep in the AFC's zone, and when the kick from Josh Bidwell came near him, he opted not to touch it. However, it glanced off his leg and rolled into the end zone, where the NFC recovered it, seemingly for a touchdown. However, the officials did not see the ball hit Mathis, and since there is no instant replay in a Pro Bowl game, NFC coach John Fox could not challenge the call. The AFC took over on their own 20, but soon afterward the NFC defense came up with another interception. Roy Williams intercepted a Manning pass and returned it 11 yards before handing it off to the Atlanta Falcons' DeAngelo Hall, who took it 57 yards to the AFC's 20. Michael Vick hit tight end Alge Crumpler with a 14-yard touchdown pass with 8 seconds left in the half to tie the score at 10–10.

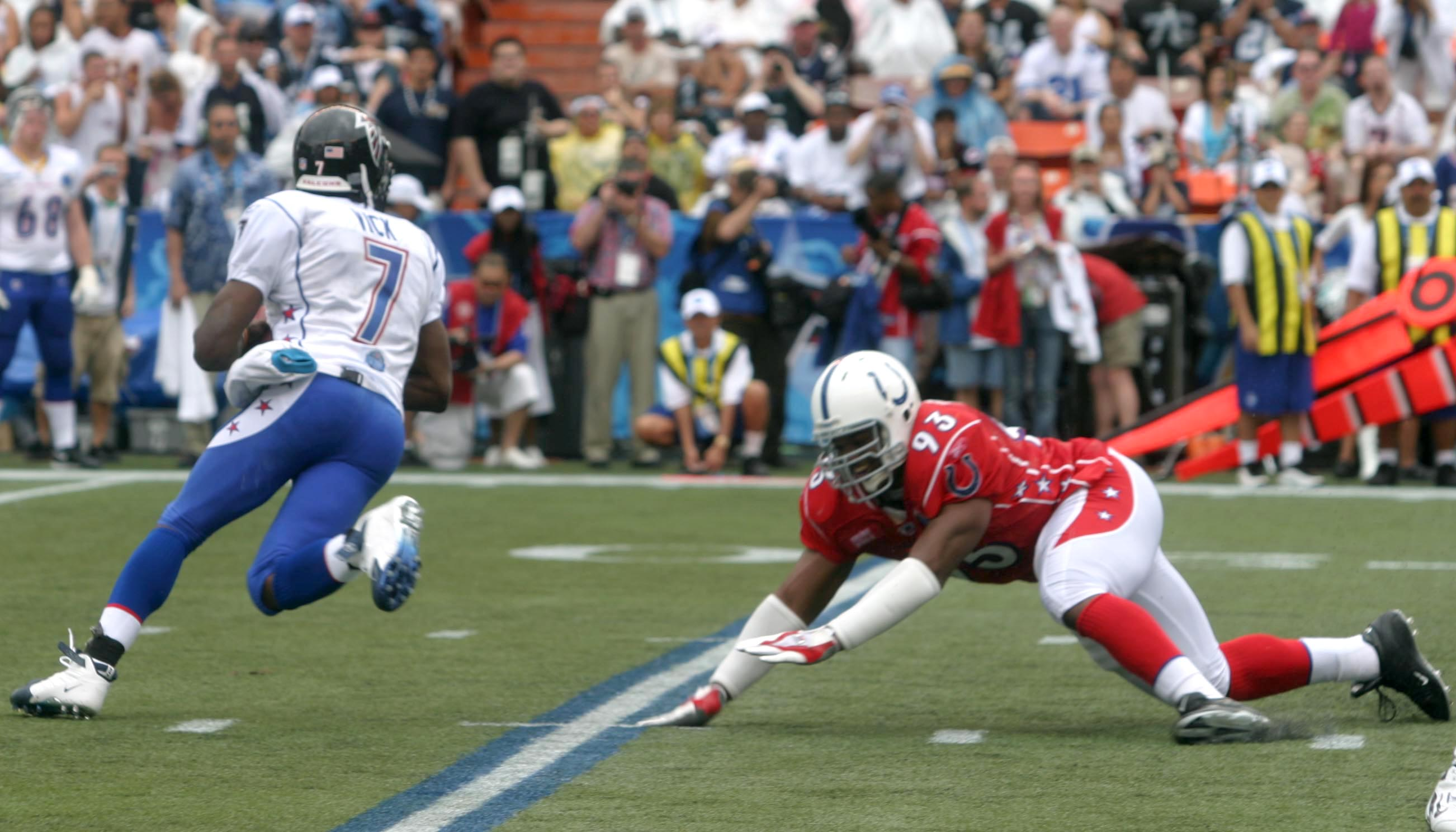
NFC quarterback Michael Vick scrambles past Dwight Freeney.

Jake Delhomme of the Carolina Panthers took over at quarterback at the start of the third quarter, and hit Steve Smith, with three straight passes. The Carolina Panthers provided the NFC's team with their coaching staff, and with the Panthers' quarterback and wide receiver running the offense, the NFC moved quickly down the field. The drive stalled at midfield, and the NFC punted it away. After the AFC's drive, led by Chiefs' quarterback Trent Green, ended in a punt, Delhomme once again moved the NFC downfield before being sacked by Casey Hampton, forcing a fumble that was recovered by the AFC's Marcus Stroud. The NFC's defense once again responded, and on the third play of the drive, Derrick Brooks returned an interception 59 yards for a touchdown that gave the NFC the lead at 17–10. After the AFC punted away their next drive, Santana Moss fumbled the ball away in AFC territory. Green led the AFC down the field again, thanks in large part to a 20-yard run by his Chiefs teammate, Larry Johnson. Green tied the game at 17–17 with a one-yard quarterback sneak. Matt Hasselbeck took over for the NFC again, and led the team on a scoring drive, ending with a 22-yard field goal by Rackers that gave the NFC the lead again. Steve McNair came in for a play at AFC quarterback, and got hit and fumbled the ball. After the NFC punted the ball away, McNair came back and got sacked, giving the NFC the ball on their own 18-yard line. Following the fumble, the AFC switched to a shotgun formation. After another Rackers field goal, the AFC took over on their own 26 with 1:10 left. McNair brought the AFC to midfield, but could not get them the touchdown they needed, and the game ended on a sack by the New York Giants' Michael Strahan. Brooks was given the Most Valuable Player award.

=== Scoring summary ===
- AFC – TD Chris Chambers 16 yd. pass from Peyton Manning (Shayne Graham kick) – 5:09 1st
- NFC – FG Neil Rackers 32 yd. – 7:45 2nd
- AFC – FG Shayne Graham 31 yd. – 3:22 2nd
- NFC – TD Alge Crumpler 14 yd. pass from Michael Vick (Rackers kick) – 0:08 2nd
- NFC – TD Derrick Brooks 59 yd. interception return (Rackers kick) – 5:01 3rd
- AFC – TD Trent Green 1 yd. run (Graham kick) – 12:47 4th
- NFC – FG Neil Rackers 22 yd. – 6:29 4th
- NFC – FG Neil Rackers 20 yd. – 1:10 4th

== AFC roster ==
=== Offense ===
Position	Starter(s)	Reserve(s)	Alternate(s)
Quarterback	18 Peyton Manning, Indianapolis	12 Tom Brady, New England^{[b]} 9 Carson Palmer, Cincinnati^{[b]}	16 Jake Plummer, Denver^{[a]}^{[b]} 10 Trent Green, Kansas City^{[a]} 9 Steve McNair, Tennessee^{[a]}
Running back	32 Edgerrin James, Indianapolis	27 Larry Johnson, Kansas City; 21 LaDainian Tomlinson, San Diego	
Fullback	41 Lorenzo Neal, San Diego		
Wide receiver	88 Marvin Harrison, Indianapolis; 85 Chad Johnson, Cincinnati	84 Chris Chambers, Miami; 80 Rod Smith, Denver	
Tight end	85 Antonio Gates, San Diego	88 Tony Gonzalez, Kansas City	
Offensive tackle	71 Willie Anderson, Cincinnati; 77 Willie Roaf, Kansas City^{[b]}	78 Tarik Glenn, Indianapolis^{[c]}	75 Jonathan Ogden, Baltimore^{[a]}
Offensive guard	66 Alan Faneca, Pittsburgh; 68 Will Shields, Kansas City	54 Brian Waters, Kansas City	
Center	63 Jeff Saturday, Indianapolis	64 Jeff Hartings, Pittsburgh	

=== Defense ===
Position	Starter(s)	Reserve(s)	Alternate(s)
Defensive end	93 Dwight Freeney, Indianapolis; 99 Jason Taylor, Miami^{[b]}	56 Derrick Burgess, Oakland^{[c]}	93 Kyle Vanden Bosch, Tennessee^{[a]}
Defensive tackle	99 Marcus Stroud, Jacksonville; 76 Jamal Williams, San Diego	93 Richard Seymour, New England^{[b]}	98 Casey Hampton, Pittsburgh^{[a]}
Outside linebacker	59 Cato June, Indianapolis; 56 Shawne Merriman, San Diego	55 Joey Porter, Pittsburgh	
Inside linebacker	56 Al Wilson, Denver	54 Zach Thomas, Miami^{[b]}	51 Jonathan Vilma, N.Y. Jets^{[a]}
Cornerback	24 Champ Bailey, Denver; 24 Deltha O'Neal, Cincinnati	24 Ty Law, N.Y. Jets	
Free safety	21 Bob Sanders, Indianapolis	47 John Lynch, Denver	
Strong safety	43 Troy Polamalu, Pittsburgh		

=== Special teams ===
Position:	Player:
Punter	8 Brian Moorman, Buffalo
Placekicker	17 Shayne Graham, Cincinnati
Kick returner	13 Jerome Mathis, Houston
Special teamer	31 Hanik Milligan, San Diego
Long snapper	54 Mike Schneck, Buffalo^{[d]}

== NFC roster ==
=== Offense ===
Position	Starter(s)	Reserve(s)	Alternate(s)
Quarterback	8 Matt Hasselbeck, Seattle	17 Jake Delhomme, Carolina; 7 Michael Vick, Atlanta	
Running back	37 Shaun Alexander, Seattle	21 Tiki Barber, N.Y. Giants; 28 Warrick Dunn, Atlanta	
Fullback	38 Mack Strong, Seattle		
Wide receiver	89 Santana Moss, Washington; 89 Steve Smith, Carolina	11 Larry Fitzgerald, Arizona; 81 Torry Holt, St. Louis	
Tight end	83 Alge Crumpler, Atlanta	80 Jeremy Shockey, N.Y. Giants^{[b]}	82 Jason Witten, Dallas^{[a]}
Offensive tackle	71 Walter Jones, Seattle; 76 Orlando Pace, St. Louis	60 Chris Samuels, Washington	
Offensive guard	73 Larry Allen, Dallas; 76 Steve Hutchinson, Seattle	68 Mike Wahle, Carolina	
Center	57 Olin Kreutz, Chicago^{[b]}	65 LeCharles Bentley, New Orleans^{[c]}	61 Robbie Tobeck, Seattle^{[a]}

=== Defense ===
Position	Starter(s)	Reserve(s)	Alternate(s)
Defensive end	90 Julius Peppers, Carolina; 92 Michael Strahan, N.Y. Giants	72 Osi Umenyiora, N.Y. Giants	
Defensive tackle	92 Shaun Rogers, Detroit; 91 Tommie Harris, Chicago	75 Rod Coleman, Atlanta^{[b]}	97 La'Roi Glover, Dallas^{[a]}
Outside linebacker	56 Keith Brooking, Atlanta; 55 Derrick Brooks, Tampa Bay	55 Lance Briggs, Chicago	
Inside linebacker	54 Brian Urlacher, Chicago^{[b]}	54 Jeremiah Trotter, Philadelphia^{[c]}	51 Lofa Tatupu, Seattle^{[a]}
Cornerback	20 Ronde Barber, Tampa Bay; 21 DeAngelo Hall, Atlanta	31 Nathan Vasher, Chicago	
Free safety	42 Darren Sharper, Minnesota		
Strong safety	31 Roy Williams, Dallas	30 Mike Brown, Chicago^{[b]}	20 Brian Dawkins, Philadelphia^{[a]}

=== Special teams ===
Position:	Player:
Punter	9 Josh Bidwell, Tampa Bay
Placekicker	1 Neil Rackers, Arizona
Kick returner	18 Koren Robinson, Minnesota
Special teamer	85 David Tyree, N.Y. Giants
Long snapper	88 Mike Bartrum, Philadelphia^{[d]}

Notes:

^{a} Replacement selection due to injury or vacancy
^{b} Injured player; selected but did not play
^{c} Replacement starter; selected as reserve
^{d} "Need player"; named by coach

== Number of selections per team ==
AFC team	Selections	NFC team	Selections
Kansas City Chiefs	6	Green Bay Packers	0
Baltimore Ravens	1	St. Louis Rams	2
Tennessee Titans	2	Dallas Cowboys	4
Indianapolis Colts	7	Seattle Seahawks	7
Miami Dolphins	3	Carolina Panthers	4
Denver Broncos	5	Minnesota Vikings	2
New England Patriots	2	Tampa Bay Buccaneers	3
Pittsburgh Steelers	5	Chicago Bears	6
Buffalo Bills	2	Philadelphia Eagles	3
Cincinnati Bengals	5	San Francisco 49ers	0
New York Jets	2	Washington Redskins	2
Jacksonville Jaguars	1	Atlanta Falcons	6
Cleveland Browns	0	New Orleans Saints	1
Houston Texans	1	New York Giants	5
Oakland Raiders	1	Arizona Cardinals	2
San Diego Chargers	6	Detroit Lions	1

== Officials ==
- Referee: Gerald Austin
- Umpire: Steve Wilson
- Head Linesman: John Schleyer
- Line Judge: Carl Johnson
- Field Judge: Scott Steenson
- Side Judge: Laird Hayes
- Back Judge: Phil Luckett

== Fan balloting ==
On December 19, 2005, the NFL announced that fans had cast more than 70.5 million votes via the Internet and the Sprint Wireless telephone service, bettering by more than 16% the 61 million votes cast for the 2005 Pro Bowl. Of the top ten vote-getters, all were offensive players and seven, including four of the top five, hailed from the AFC. Colts quarterback Peyton Manning led all players, garnering 1,184,142 votes, a new single-player record, and narrowly edging out Seahawks running back Shaun Alexander (1,110,575 votes) and Chargers running back LaDainian Tomlinson (1,044,360 votes).

On the defensive side, AFC players filled six of the top ten spots, though Bears middle linebacker Brian Urlacher led all defenders, earning 420,983 votes; Broncos cornerback Champ Bailey (379,477 votes), Colts defensive end Dwight Freeney (374,289 votes), and Bengals cornerback Deltha O'Neal (373,918 votes) paced the AFC.

Among NFL rookies, Buccaneers running back Carnell Williams was the leading vote-getter, receiving 219,736 votes to surpass Steelers tight end Heath Miller (217,928 votes). Cowboys outside linebacker DeMarcus Ware (104,592 votes), Vikings punter Chris Kluwe (100,555 votes), and Bengals inside linebacker Odell Thurman (88,715 votes) rounded out the top five.

The top vote-getter at each position (as on the official NFL ballot), irrespective of conference:

Offense

Player	Team	Position	Fan votes
Peyton Manning	Indianapolis Colts	Quarterback	1,184,142
Shaun Alexander	Seattle Seahawks	Running Back	1,110,575
Chris Cooley	Washington Redskins	Fullback	422,314
Chad Johnson	Cincinnati Bengals	Wide receiver	987,650
Antonio Gates	San Diego Chargers	Tight end	941,846
Jeff Saturday	Indianapolis Colts	Center	234,847
Larry Allen	Dallas Cowboys	Guard	248,561
Orlando Pace	Saint Louis Rams	Tackle	185,095

Defense

Player	Team	Position	Fan votes
Dwight Freeney	Indianapolis Colts	Defensive end	374,289
Rod Coleman	Atlanta Falcons	Interior lineman (Defensive tackle)	307,839
Demorrio Williams	Atlanta Falcons	Outside linebacker	244,419
Brian Urlacher	Chicago Bears	Inside linebacker (Middle linebacker)	420,983
Champ Bailey	Denver Broncos	Cornerback	379,477
Brian Dawkins	Philadelphia Eagles	Free safety	193,166
Troy Polamalu	Pittsburgh Steelers	Strong safety	270,348

Special teams

Player	Team	Position	Fan votes
Neil Rackers	Arizona Cardinals	Placekicker	533,004
Josh Bidwell	Tampa Bay Buccaneers	Punter	236,305
Dante Hall	Kansas City Chiefs	Kick returner	269,541
Robert Mathis	Indianapolis Colts	Special teams	130,890

Notably, four players—Cooley, Williams, Hall, and Robert Mathis—finished first in the balloting for their respective positions among fans but failed to secure a starting or reserve spot for the game.

== Entertainment ==
JoJo performed the national anthem. Musical group Backstreet Boys performed during halftime alongside "200 hula dancers, drummers and fire knife dancers and 400 youth performers."

== Stats ==
- Most players selected from one team was seven, tied between the AFC's Indianapolis Colts and NFC's Seattle Seahawks (a Super Bowl XL contender).
- Most starters selected from one team:
  - AFC: Indianapolis Colts, 7 (all of the players selected)
  - NFC: Seattle Seahawks (Super Bowl XL contender), 5
- First-time selections was big: a total of 36 were in the Pro Bowl; 20 were starters. Here's the count for first-time selections:
  - AFC: 16 (11 starters)
  - NFC: 20 (9 starters)
    - Of interesting note, all four special team players (punter, kicker, kick returner, and special-team player) for both conferences were first-time selections.

== Sources ==
- "Defense leads NFC to 23–17 Pro Bowl win". NFL.com wire reports. February 12, 2006.
- "NFL Gamebook – 2006 Pro Bowl" (PDF). NFL.com. February 12, 2006.
