= 2005 NFL season =

American football season

Regular season
- Duration: September 8, 2005 – January 1, 2006

Playoffs
- Start date: January 7, 2006
- AFC Champions: Pittsburgh Steelers
- NFC Champions: Seattle Seahawks

Super Bowl XL
- Date: February 5, 2006
- Site: Ford Field, Detroit, Michigan
- Champions: Pittsburgh Steelers

Pro Bowl
- Date: February 12, 2006
- Site: Aloha Stadium

AFC teams: West, North, South, East
NFC teams: West, North, South, East

The 2005 NFL season was the 86th regular season of the National Football League (NFL).

Regular season play was held from September 8, 2005, to January 1, 2006. The regular season also saw the first ever regular season game played outside the United States, as well as the New Orleans Saints being forced to play elsewhere due to damage to the Superdome and the entire New Orleans area by Hurricane Katrina.

The playoffs began on January 7. The New England Patriots' streak of 10 consecutive playoff wins and chance at a third straight Super Bowl title was ended in the Divisional Playoff Round by the Denver Broncos, and eventually the NFL title was won by the Pittsburgh Steelers, who defeated the Seattle Seahawks 21–10 in Super Bowl XL at Ford Field in Detroit, Michigan on February 5 for their fifth Super Bowl win. This also marked the first time that a sixth-seeded team, who by the nature of their seeding would play every game on the road, would advance to and win the Super Bowl.

The season formally concluded with the Pro Bowl, the league's all-star game, at Aloha Stadium in Honolulu, Hawaii on February 12.

This was also the final full season for Paul Tagliabue as commissioner.

== Draft ==
The 2005 NFL draft was held from April 23 to 24, 2005, at New York City's Jacob K. Javits Convention Center. With the first pick, the San Francisco 49ers selected quarterback Alex Smith from the University of Utah.

== Rule changes ==
- The "horse-collar tackle", in which a defender grabs inside the back or side of an opponent's shoulder pads and pulls that player down, is prohibited. Named the "Roy Williams Rule" after the Dallas Cowboys safety whose horse collar tackles during the 2004 season caused serious injuries to several players.
- Peel-back blocks (in which an offensive player blocks a defender who is moving back toward the direction of his own end zone) below the waist and from the back are now illegal.
- Unnecessary roughness would be called for blocks away from the play on punters or kickers, similar to the same protection quarterbacks have after interceptions.
- When time is stopped by officials prior to the snap for any reason while time is in, the play clock resumes with the same amount of time that remained on it – with a minimum of 10 seconds. Previously, the play-clock would be reset to 25 seconds.
- During field goal and extra point attempts, the defensive team will be penalized for unsportsmanlike conduct if it calls consecutive timeouts in an attempt to "ice" the kicker. Previously, the second timeout request was only denied by officials, and thus could be used to distract the kickers.
- Players cannot run, dive into, cut, or throw their bodies against or on an opponent who is out of the play or should not have reasonably anticipated such contact.
- If the defensive team commits a dead ball foul following the end of the half, the offensive team may choose to extend the period for one more play. Previously, the half automatically ended without the defensive team being penalized.
- The prohibition on offensive players pushing other offensive players was removed, allowing plays such as the "Bush Push" (later renamed the "Tush Push" popularized by the Philadelphia Eagles years later).
- During a punt, if the kicking team illegally touches the ball inside the 5-yard line, the receiving team has the option of either treating the result as a touchback or replaying the down with a 5-yard penalty against the kicking team. Previously, the receiving team's only options were either the latter or taking over possession at the spot of the foul. This change prevents an ineligible player from keeping a kick from entering the end zone and becoming a touchback.
- If the kicking team commits a penalty, the receiving team can have the option of adding the penalty yardage to the return or taking a penalty and forcing the kicking team to rekick the ball. Previously they could take the latter or decline the penalty.
- If a team calls for an instant replay challenge after it has used all its challenges or is out of timeouts, it will be assessed an unsportsmanlike conduct penalty. The penalty will also be assessed if a team calls for a challenge inside of two minutes of either half or overtime, when only the replay assistant can initiate reviews. Previously, the request was only denied by the Referee. This change was made to prevent head coaches from constantly stopping the game for any reason, including to just argue with the Referee.
- Teams are only able to request an instant replay challenge by tossing their red flag to get the attention of officials. The league decided to do away with the electronic pager/vibrating alert system used by head coaches because practically all of them always used their red flags instead of their pagers anyway. (However, the replay assistant will still use the pagers to notify the officials of a replay request.)

== Officiating changes ==
Umpire Butch Hannah suffered back to back injuries early in the 2005 season. First in a matchup against the Tampa Bay Buccaneers and the New York Jets cornerback Ronde Barber got into a heated altercation with Jets center Kevin Mawae. As Hannah stepped in to break up the scuffle, Barber swung his arm and inadvertently punched Hannah directly in the right eye, sending the official sprawling to the turf. Hannah managed to stay in that game, and Barber was later fined $30,000 by the NFL for the accidental hit. The following week during a matchup with the Cleveland Browns and Baltimore Ravens Hannah suffered a separate, legitimate injury when he sprained a knee ligament, forcing him to miss three to four weeks of action. Eventually sitting out the remainder of the season to recover, a rotation of other NFL umpires from other officiating crews took over Hannah’s spot for Walt Anderson’s crew.

== Notable retirements ==
- Emmitt Smith
- Jerry Rice
- Ted Johnson
- Tim Brown
- Rich Gannon
- Derrick Alexander
- Donnie Abraham
- Aeneas Williams
- Garrison Hearst
- Brock Marion
- Brian Mitchell
- Rob Konrad
- Tyrone Wheatley
- Doug Pederson
- Kevin Hardy
- Otis Smith
- Morris Lewis
- Marvin Jones
- Alex Sulfsted
- Mikhael Ricks
- Gary Anderson
- Richmond Webb
- Wade Richey
- Vick King
- Freddie Jones

== 2005 deaths ==
- Steve Belichick former fullback and father of Patriots and Browns head coach Bill Belichick
- Wellington Mara Owner of the New York Giants
- Bob Tisch Owner of the New York Giants
- Hank Stram former head coach of the Kansas City Chiefs

== Regular season ==
=== First regular season game played outside the United States ===
The 2005 season also featured the first ever regular season game played outside the United States when the San Francisco 49ers–Arizona Cardinals game was played at Estadio Azteca in Mexico City on October 2 (the Cardinals won 31–14). The game drew an NFL regular season record of 103,467 paid fans. It was a home game for the Cardinals, mostly because the team rarely sold out at their then-home field, Sun Devil Stadium in Tempe, Arizona. This season was the last year that the Cardinals played at Sun Devil Stadium; the team then moved to their new Cardinals Stadium in nearby Glendale.

=== Effect of the 2005 Atlantic hurricane season ===
==== Effect of Hurricane Katrina ====
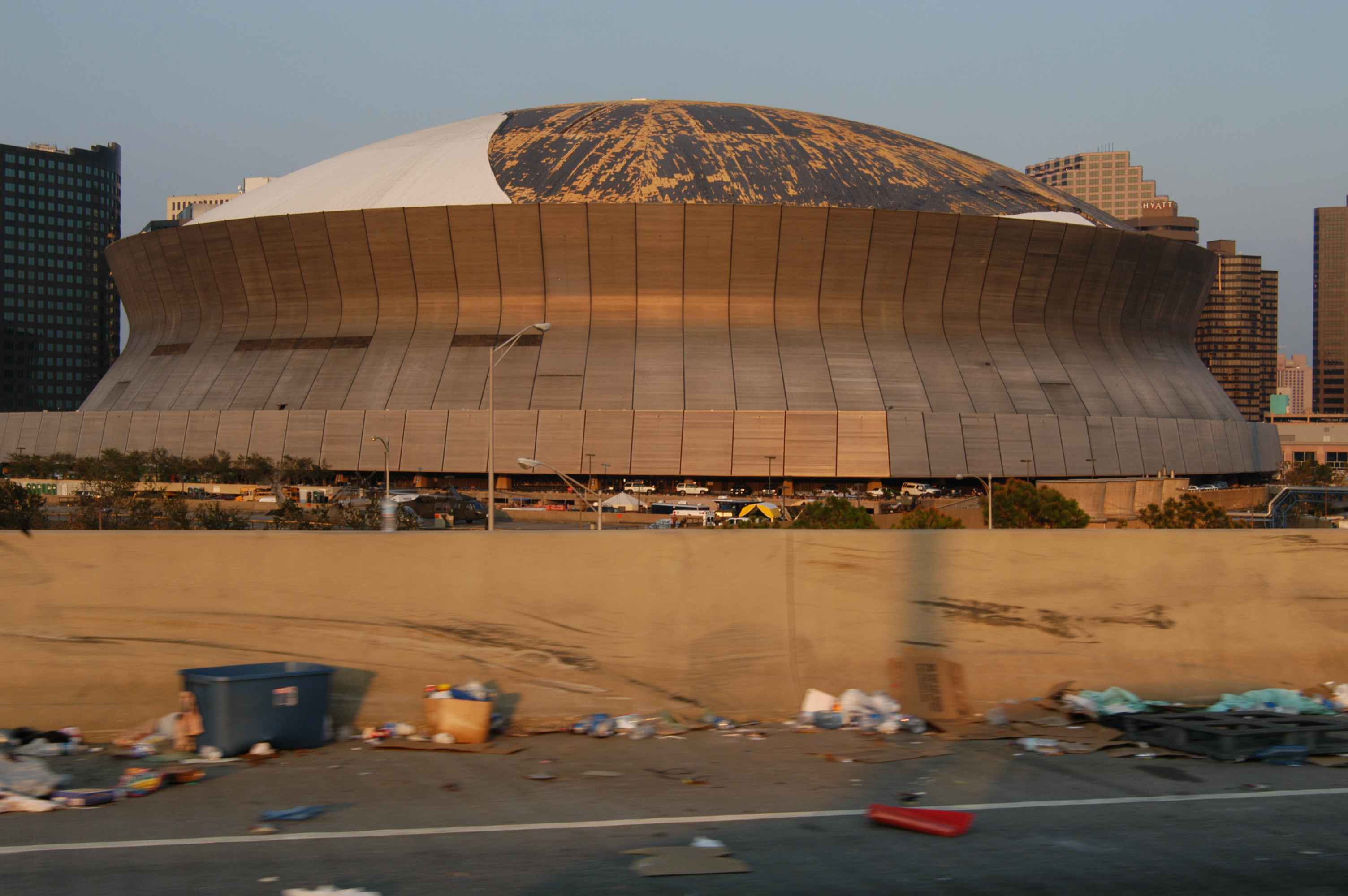
The Louisiana Superdome did not host the New Orleans Saints during the 2005 season, due in part to damage seen here.

Due to the damage caused by Hurricane Katrina to the Louisiana Superdome and the greater New Orleans area, the New Orleans Saints' entire 2005 home schedule was played at different venues while the Saints set up temporary operations in San Antonio, Texas. The Saints' first home game scheduled for September 18 against New York Giants was moved to September 19 at Giants Stadium. The impromptu "Monday Night doubleheader" with the game already scheduled (Washington at Dallas) was a success, and was made an annual part of the schedule from 2006 through 2020.

The NFL designated its second weekend, September 18 and 19, as "Hurricane Relief Weekend', with fund raising collections at all of the league's games. The Saints' remaining home games were split between the Alamodome in San Antonio and Louisiana State University's Tiger Stadium in Baton Rouge, Louisiana. Being forced to travel to 13 of their 16 games (only three of their games were actually played in the same city where they practiced) and practice in substandard facilities and conditions in San Antonio, the Saints finished 3–13, their worst season since 1999.

The last time an NFL franchise had to play at an alternate site was in 2002, when the Chicago Bears played home games in Champaign, Illinois, 120 miles (200 km) away, due to the reconstruction of Soldier Field. The last NFL team to abandon their home city during a season was the 1952 Dallas Texans, whose franchise was returned to the league after drawing several poor crowds at the Cotton Bowl. They played their final "home" game in Akron, Ohio.

==== Effect of Hurricane Wilma ====
The October 23 game between the Kansas City Chiefs and Miami Dolphins at Dolphins Stadium was rescheduled to Friday, October 21 at 7:00 pm EDT to beat Hurricane Wilma's arrival to the Miami, Florida area. The game remained on CBS, but only aired in the primary and secondary markets of Kansas City and Miami. The Chiefs won the game, 30–20, and became the first visiting team to travel and play on the same day. Since the game was planned for Sunday afternoon, it is one of the few times in history that the Dolphins wore their white jerseys in a home game played at night.

== Regular season standings ==
=== Division ===
AFC East
	W	L	T	PCT	DIV	CONF	PF	PA	STK
^{(4)} New England Patriots	10	6	0	.625	5–1	7–5	379	338	L1
Miami Dolphins	9	7	0	.563	3–3	7–5	318	317	W6
Buffalo Bills	5	11	0	.313	2–4	5–7	271	367	L1
New York Jets	4	12	0	.250	2–4	3–9	240	355	W1

AFC North
	W	L	T	PCT	DIV	CONF	PF	PA	STK
^{(3)} Cincinnati Bengals	11	5	0	.688	5–1	7–5	421	350	L2
^{(6)} Pittsburgh Steelers	11	5	0	.688	4–2	7–5	389	258	W4
Baltimore Ravens	6	10	0	.375	2–4	4–8	265	299	L1
Cleveland Browns	6	10	0	.375	1–5	4–8	232	301	W1

AFC South
	W	L	T	PCT	DIV	CONF	PF	PA	STK
^{(1)} Indianapolis Colts	14	2	0	.875	6–0	11–1	439	247	W1
^{(5)} Jacksonville Jaguars	12	4	0	.750	4–2	9–3	361	269	W3
Tennessee Titans	4	12	0	.250	2–4	3–9	299	421	L3
Houston Texans	2	14	0	.125	0–6	1–11	260	431	L2

AFC West
	W	L	T	PCT	DIV	CONF	PF	PA	STK
^{(2)} Denver Broncos	13	3	0	.813	5–1	10–2	395	258	W4
Kansas City Chiefs	10	6	0	.625	4–2	9–3	403	325	W2
San Diego Chargers	9	7	0	.563	3–3	7–5	418	312	L2
Oakland Raiders	4	12	0	.250	0–6	2–10	290	383	L6

NFC East
	W	L	T	PCT	DIV	CONF	PF	PA	STK
^{(4)} New York Giants	11	5	0	.688	4–2	8–4	422	314	W1
^{(6)} Washington Redskins	10	6	0	.625	5–1	10–2	359	293	W5
Dallas Cowboys	9	7	0	.563	3–3	7–5	325	308	L1
Philadelphia Eagles	6	10	0	.375	0–6	3–9	310	388	L2

NFC North
	W	L	T	PCT	DIV	CONF	PF	PA	STK
^{(2)} Chicago Bears	11	5	0	.688	5–1	10–2	260	202	L1
Minnesota Vikings	9	7	0	.563	5–1	8–4	306	344	W1
Detroit Lions	5	11	0	.313	1–5	3–9	254	345	L1
Green Bay Packers	4	12	0	.250	1–5	4–8	298	344	W1

NFC South
	W	L	T	PCT	DIV	CONF	PF	PA	STK
^{(3)} Tampa Bay Buccaneers	11	5	0	.688	5–1	9–3	300	274	W2
^{(5)} Carolina Panthers	11	5	0	.688	4–2	8–4	391	259	W1
Atlanta Falcons	8	8	0	.500	2–4	5–7	351	341	L3
New Orleans Saints	3	13	0	.188	1–5	1–11	235	398	L5

NFC West
	W	L	T	PCT	DIV	CONF	PF	PA	STK
^{(1)} Seattle Seahawks	13	3	0	.813	6–0	10–2	452	271	L1
St. Louis Rams	6	10	0	.375	1–5	3–9	363	429	W1
Arizona Cardinals	5	11	0	.313	3–3	4–8	311	387	L1
San Francisco 49ers	4	12	0	.250	2–4	3–9	239	428	W2

=== Conference ===
AFC
#	Team	Division	W	L	T	PCT	DIV	CONF	SOS	SOV	STK
Division leaders
1	Indianapolis Colts	South	14	2	0	.875	6–0	11–1	.457	.424	W1
2	Denver Broncos	West	13	3	0	.813	5–1	10–2	.500	.471	W4
3 (Note: Cincinnati clinched the AFC North and #3 seed over Pittsburgh based on division record.)	Cincinnati Bengals	North	11	5	0	.688	5–1	7–5	.477	.398	L2
4	New England Patriots	East	10	6	0	.625	5–1	7–5	.508	.400	L1
Wild cards
5	Jacksonville Jaguars	South	12	4	0	.750	4–2	9–3	.465	.375	W3
6	Pittsburgh Steelers	North	11	5	0	.688	4–2	7–5	.492	.415	W4
Did not qualify for the postseason
7	Kansas City Chiefs	West	10	6	0	.625	4–2	9–3	.504	.475	W2
8 (Note: Miami finished ahead of San Diego based on head-to-head victory.)	Miami Dolphins	East	9	7	0	.563	3–3	7–5	.457	.438	W6
9	San Diego Chargers	West	9	7	0	.563	3–3	7–5	.559	.500	L2
10 (Note: Baltimore finished ahead of Cleveland based on division record.)	Baltimore Ravens	North	6	10	0	.375	2–4	4–8	.523	.375	L1
11	Cleveland Browns	North	6	10	0	.375	1–5	4–8	.508	.396	W1
12	Buffalo Bills	East	5	11	0	.313	2–4	5–7	.500	.450	L1
13 (Note: NY Jets finished ahead of Tennessee based on common record. (2–4 vs. 1–5 against: Miami, Jacksonville, Baltimore, Atlanta, and Oakland). Conference tie break was initially used to eliminate Oakland (see below).)	New York Jets	East	4	12	0	.250	2–4	3–9	.527	.453	W1
14 (Note: Oakland finished ahead of Tennessee based on head-to-head victory.) (Note: While conference record initially eliminated Oakland in the three-way tie with NY Jets, Tennessee, and Oakland, once the NY Jets were ranked above both Tennessee and Oakland, the tiebreaking procedure restarts with the remaining teams, resulting in Oakland ranking above Tennessee.)	Oakland Raiders	West	4	12	0	.250	0–6	2–10	.539	.438	L6
15	Tennessee Titans	South	4	12	0	.250	2–4	3–9	.512	.219	L3
16	Houston Texans	South	2	14	0	.125	0–6	1–11	.535	.344	L2
Tiebreakers (Note: When breaking ties for three or more teams under the NFL's rules, they are first broken within divisions, then comparing only the highest ranked remaining team from each division.)

NFC
#	Team	Division	W	L	T	PCT	DIV	CONF	SOS	SOV	STK
Division leaders
1	Seattle Seahawks	West	13	3	0	.813	6–0	10–2	.430	.404	L1
2 (Note: Chicago clinched the #2 seed over Tampa Bay and NY Giants based on conference record. Division tie break was initially used to eliminate Carolina (see below).)	Chicago Bears	North	11	5	0	.688	5–1	10–2	.457	.398	L1
3 (Note: Tampa Bay clinched the NFC South over Carolina based on division record.) (Note: Tampa Bay finished ahead of NY Giants based on conference record, claiming the #3 seed.)	Tampa Bay Buccaneers	South	11	5	0	.688	5–1	9–3	.449	.426	W2
4	New York Giants	East	11	5	0	.688	4–2	8–4	.492	.432	W1
Wild cards
5	Carolina Panthers	South	11	5	0	.688	4–2	8–4	.449	.409	W1
6	Washington Redskins	East	10	6	0	.625	5–1	10–2	.539	.500	W5
Did not qualify for the postseason
7 (Note: Minnesota finished ahead of Dallas based on conference record.)	Minnesota Vikings	North	9	7	0	.563	5–1	8–4	.484	.382	W1
8	Dallas Cowboys	East	9	7	0	.563	3–3	7–5	.523	.465	L1
9	Atlanta Falcons	South	8	8	0	.500	2–4	5–7	.492	.344	L3
10 (Note: Philadelphia finished ahead of St. Louis based on head-to-head victory.)	Philadelphia Eagles	East	6	10	0	.375	0–6	3–9	.531	.385	L2
11	St. Louis Rams	West	6	10	0	.375	1–5	3–9	.484	.365	W1
12 (Note: Detroit finished ahead of Arizona based on head-to-head victory.)	Detroit Lions	North	5	11	0	.313	1–5	3–9	.504	.300	L1
13	Arizona Cardinals	West	5	11	0	.313	3–3	4–8	.508	.300	L1
14 (Note: Green Bay finished ahead of San Francisco based on conference record.)	Green Bay Packers	North	4	12	0	.250	1–5	4–8	.531	.453	W1
15	San Francisco 49ers	West	4	12	0	.250	2–4	3–9	.539	.391	W2
16	New Orleans Saints	South	3	13	0	.188	1–5	1–11	.523	.417	L5
Tiebreakers (Note: When breaking ties for three or more teams under the NFL's rules, they are first broken within divisions, then comparing only the highest-ranked remaining team from each division.)

== Playoffs ==
Within each conference, the four division winners and the top two non-division winners with the best overall regular season records) qualified for the playoffs. The four division winners are seeded 1–4 based on their overall won-lost-tied record, and the wild card teams are seeded 5–6. The NFL does not use a fixed bracket playoff system, and there are no restrictions regarding teams from the same division matching up in any round. In the first round, dubbed the wild-card playoffs or wild-card weekend, the third-seeded division winner hosts the sixth-seed wild card, and the fourth seed hosts the fifth. The 1 and 2 seeds from each conference received a first-round bye. In the second round, the divisional playoffs, the number 1 seed hosts the worst-surviving seed from the first round (seed 4, 5, or 6), while the number 2 seed will play the other team (seed 3, 4, or 5). The two surviving teams from each conference's divisional playoff games met in the respective AFC and NFC Conference Championship games, hosted by the higher seed. Although the Super Bowl, the championship round of the playoffs, is played at a neutral site, the designated home team is based on an annual rotation by conference.

Playoff seeds
Seed	AFC	NFC
1	Indianapolis Colts (South winner)	Seattle Seahawks (West winner)
2	Denver Broncos (West winner)	Chicago Bears (North winner)
3	Cincinnati Bengals (North winner)	Tampa Bay Buccaneers (South winner)
4	New England Patriots (East winner)	New York Giants (East winner)
5	Jacksonville Jaguars (wild card)	Carolina Panthers (wild card)
6	Pittsburgh Steelers (wild card)	Washington Redskins (wild card)

=== Bracket ===
Jan 8 – Giants Stadium	Jan 15 – Soldier Field
5	Carolina	23
5	Carolina	29
4	NY Giants	0	Jan 22 – Qwest Field
2	Chicago	21
NFC
Jan 7 – Raymond James Stadium	5	Carolina	14
Jan 14 – Qwest Field
1	Seattle	34
6	Washington	17	NFC Championship
6	Washington	10
3	Tampa Bay	10	Feb 5 – Ford Field
1	Seattle	20
Wild-card round
Divisional round
Jan 8 – Paul Brown Stadium	N1	Seattle	10
Jan 15 – RCA Dome
A6	Pittsburgh	21
6	Pittsburgh	31	Super Bowl XL
6	Pittsburgh	21
3	Cincinnati	17	Jan 22 – Invesco Field at Mile High
1	Indianapolis	18
AFC
Jan 7 – Gillette Stadium	6	Pittsburgh	34
Jan 14 – Invesco Field at Mile High
2	Denver	17
5	Jacksonville	3	AFC Championship
4	New England	13
4	New England	28
2	Denver	27

== Milestones ==
The following teams and players set all-time NFL records during the season:

Record	Player/team	Date/opponent	Previous record holder
Longest return of a missed field goal/ longest play in NFL history	Nathan Vasher, Chicago (108 yards)	November 13, vs. San Francisco	Chris McAlister, Baltimore vs. Denver, September 30, 2002 (107 yards)
Most consecutive games played, career	Jeff Feagles, New York Giants	November 27, at Seattle	Jim Marshall, 1960–1979 (282)
Most touchdowns, season	Shaun Alexander, Seattle (28)	January 1, at Green Bay	Priest Holmes, Kansas City, 2003 (27)
Most field goals, season	Neil Rackers, Arizona (40)	January 1, at Indianapolis	Tied by 2 players (39)
Most field goals by a team, season	Arizona (43)	January 1, at Indianapolis	Tied by 2 teams (39)

== Statistical leaders ==
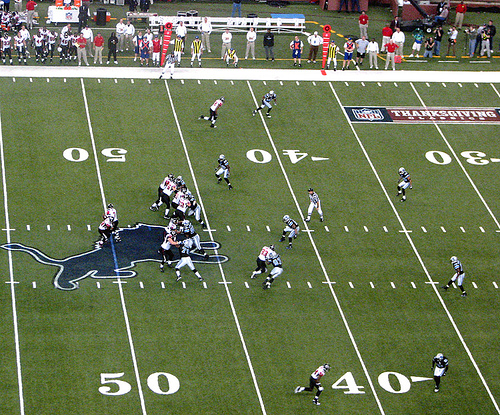
Atlanta at Detroit on Thanksgiving, November 24, 2005

=== Team ===
Points scored	Seattle Seahawks (452)
Total yards gained	Kansas City Chiefs (6,192)
Yards rushing	Atlanta Falcons (2,546)
Yards passing	Arizona Cardinals (4,437)
Fewest points allowed	Chicago Bears (202)
Fewest total yards allowed	Tampa Bay Buccaneers (4,444)
Fewest rushing yards allowed	San Diego Chargers (1,349)
Fewest passing yards allowed	Green Bay Packers (2,680)

=== Individual ===
Scoring	Shaun Alexander, Seattle (168 points)
Touchdowns	Shaun Alexander, Seattle (28 TDs) *
Most field goals made	Neil Rackers, Arizona (40 FGs) *
Rushing yards	Shaun Alexander, Seattle (1,880 yards)
Rushing touchdowns	Shaun Alexander, Seattle (27 TDs) *
Passer rating	Peyton Manning, Indianapolis (104.1 rating)
Passing touchdowns	Carson Palmer, Cincinnati (32 TDs)
Passing yards	Tom Brady, New England (4,110 yards)
Receptions	Larry Fitzgerald, Arizona and Steve Smith, Carolina (103 catches)
Receiving yards	Steve Smith, Carolina (1,563 yards)
Receiving touchdowns	Steve Smith, Carolina, and Marvin Harrison, Indianapolis (12 TDs)
Punt returns	Reno Mahe, Philadelphia (12.8 average yards)
Kickoff returns	Terrence McGee, Buffalo (30.2 average yards)
Interceptions	Ty Law, New York Jets and Deltha O'Neal, Cincinnati (10)
Punting	Brian Moorman, Buffalo and Shane Lechler, Oakland (45.7 average yards)
Sacks	Derrick Burgess, Oakland (16)
* – Denotes new league record.

== Awards ==
Most Valuable Player	Shaun Alexander, running back, Seattle
Coach of the Year	Lovie Smith, Chicago
Offensive Player of the Year	Shaun Alexander, running back, Seattle
Defensive Player of the Year	Brian Urlacher, linebacker, Chicago
Offensive Rookie of the Year	Carnell Williams, running back, Tampa Bay
Defensive Rookie of the Year	Shawne Merriman, linebacker, San Diego
NFL Comeback Player of the Year	Tedy Bruschi, linebacker, New England; Steve Smith, wide receiver, Carolina (tie)
Walter Payton NFL Man of the Year	Peyton Manning, quarterback, Indianapolis
Super Bowl Most Valuable Player	Hines Ward, wide receiver, Pittsburgh

=== Team superlatives ===
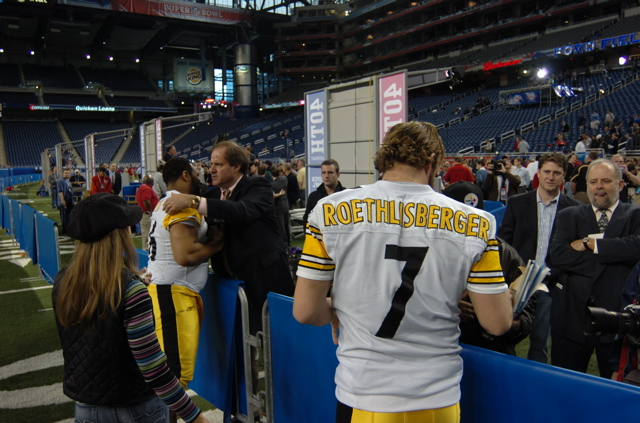
Pittsburgh Super Bowl winners Ben Roethlisberger and Jerome Bettis with sportscaster Chris Berman at Super Bowl XL media day

==== Offense ====
- Most points scored: Seattle, 452
- Fewest points scored: Cleveland, 232
- Most total offensive yards: Kansas City, 6,192
- Fewest total offensive yards: San Francisco, 3,587
- Most total passing yards: Arizona, 4,437
- Fewest total passing yards: San Francisco, 1,898
- Most rushing yards: Atlanta, 2,546
- Fewest rushing yards: Arizona, 1,138

==== Defense ====
- Fewest points allowed: Chicago, 202
- Most points allowed: Houston, 431
- Fewest total yards allowed: Tampa Bay, 4,444
- Most total yards allowed: San Francisco, 6,259
- Fewest passing yards allowed: Green Bay, 2,680
- Most passing yards allowed: San Francisco, 4,427
- Fewest rushing yards allowed: San Diego, 1,349
- Most rushing yards allowed: Houston, 2,303

All-Pro Team

Offense
Quarterback	Peyton Manning, Indianapolis
Running back	Shaun Alexander, Seattle; Tiki Barber, N.Y. Giants
Fullback	Mack Strong, Seattle
Wide receiver	Steve Smith, Carolina; Chad Johnson, Cincinnati
Tight end	Antonio Gates, San Diego
Offensive tackle	Walter Jones, Seattle; Willie Anderson, Cincinnati
Offensive guard	Steve Hutchinson, Seattle; Brian Waters, Kansas City; Alan Faneca, Pittsburgh
Center	Jeff Saturday, Indianapolis

Defense
Defensive end	Dwight Freeney, Indianapolis; Osi Umenyiora, N.Y. Giants
Defensive tackle	Jamal Williams, San Diego; Richard Seymour, New England
Outside linebacker	Lance Briggs, Chicago; Derrick Brooks, Tampa Bay
Inside linebacker	Brian Urlacher, Chicago; Al Wilson, Denver
Cornerback	Champ Bailey, Denver; Ronde Barber, Tampa Bay
Safety	Bob Sanders, Indianapolis; Troy Polamalu, Pittsburgh

Special teams
Kicker	Neil Rackers, Arizona
Punter	Brian Moorman, Buffalo
Kick returner	Jerome Mathis, Houston

== Head coach/front office changes ==
Head coach

Team	Departing coach	Interim coach	Incoming coach	Reason for leaving	Notes
Cleveland Browns	Butch Davis	Terry Robiskie	Romeo Crennel	Resigned	Butch Davis resigned on November 30th, 2004, after a 3–8 start. Then-offensive coordinator Terry Robiskie led the team to a 1–4 record during his interim stint. Although Cleveland hired Patriots defensive coordinator Romeo Crennel as their new head coach, Robiskie was retained, as the wide receivers coach.
Miami Dolphins	Dave Wannstedt	Jim Bates	Nick Saban	Resigned	Wannstedt resigned as head coach midway through the 2004 season, with the Dolphins' record standing at 1–8. Bates took the underachieving Dolphins and went 3-4 (including a Monday Night victory over the eventual Super Bowl champion New England Patriots). Saban accepted the Dolphins head coaching job on December 25, 2004, just before week 16.
San Francisco 49ers	Dennis Erickson		Mike Nolan	Fired	Erickson was fired with three years remaining on his contract. Nolan also serves as his own general manager.

Front office

Team	2004 office holder	2005 replacement	Reason for leaving	Notes
Cleveland Browns	Butch Davis	Phil Savage	Fired	Former Head Coach Butch Davis also had de facto general manager duties. The team hired Savage, the Baltimore Ravens director of player personnel, to replace him.
Miami Dolphins	Rick Spielman	Randy Mueller	Fired	New head coach Nick Saban has the final say on all roster moves. Spielman resigned on June 4, 2005, due to conflicts with Saban.
San Francisco 49ers	Terry Donahue	Mike Nolan	Fired	Donahue was fired along with head coach Dennis Erickson. New head coach Mike Nolan also serves as his own general manager.
Seattle Seahawks	Bob Ferguson	Tim Ruskell	Resigned	Ferguson resigned on February 22, 2005, as part of an executive house-cleaning following the dismissal of team president Bob Whitsitt.
Green Bay Packers	Mike Sherman	Ted Thompson	Replaced	The Packers hired Seahawks vice president of football operations Ted Thompson to take over Mike Sherman's general manager duties. Sherman remains the Packers' head coach.

== Stadiums ==
The New Orleans Saints played in Baton Rouge's Tiger Stadium for four games and in San Antonio's Alamodome for three games due to Louisiana Superdome damaged by Hurricane Katrina. Tiger Stadium's goalposts did not conform to NFL standards due to (a) two supports instead of one and (b) white paint instead of gold. The NFL granted the Saints dispensation to keep LSU's goalposts in place for their games.

In addition, with the RCA and Edward Jones domes both removing their AstroTurf surfaces in favor of the newer next-generation FieldTurf surface, the old first-generation AstroTurf surface ceased to be used in the NFL.

Pro Player Stadium was renamed Dolphins Stadium. Pro Player's parent Fruit of the Loom had filed for Chapter 11 bankruptcy protection back in 1999, and the Pro Player label was discontinued, but that stadium name was kept for several more years.

== New uniforms ==
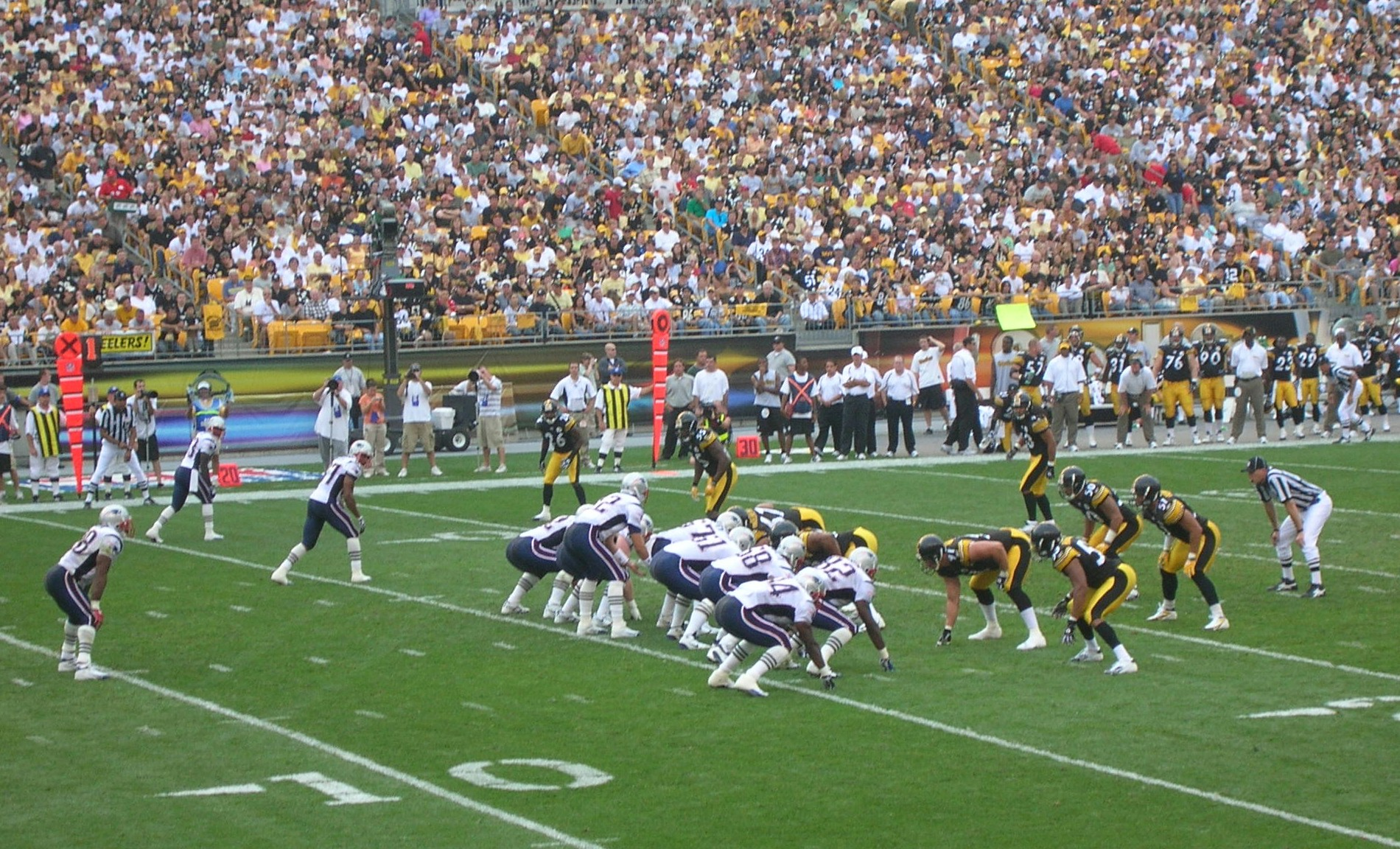
Defending champions the New England Patriots at the eventual Super Bowl winners the Pittsburgh Steelers, September 25

- The Arizona Cardinals unveiled a new uniform design featuring trim lines to the outside shoulders, sleeves, and sides of the jerseys and pants. The cardinal helmet logo was also redesigned to be more aggressive.
- The Buffalo Bills added a third alternative uniform: their 1960s throwbacks with the white helmets and red standing bison logo.
- The Detroit Lions added black third alternate uniforms at the urging of president Matt Millen, a former Raider.
- The New York Giants changed their white jerseys to mimic the team's design used in the 1950s. When they last made major changes in 2000, the Giants only modified their blue jerseys to the 1950s look while keeping many of the 1980s elements on their white jerseys, such as the 1980s blue collars instead of the 1950s white collars and red shoulder stripe design.
- The St. Louis Rams began wearing navy pants with their white jerseys for selected games.

== Television ==
This was the eighth and final year under the league's broadcast contracts with ABC, CBS, Fox, and ESPN to televise Monday Night Football, the AFC package, the NFC package, and Sunday Night Football, respectively.

While CBS and Fox renewed their television contracts to the AFC and the NFC packages, respectively, 2005 marked the final season that ABC held the exclusive rights to televise Monday Night Football. When the television contracts were renewed, the rights to broadcast MNF were awarded to Disney-owned corporate sibling ESPN. NBC then won the rights to televise Sunday Night Football, marking the first time that NBC broadcast NFL games since Super Bowl XXXII in 1998. While the NFL had indicated that it wanted SNF to become the new night for its marquee game, ABC declined to renew, citing that it had lost millions of dollars on the MNF despite generating high ratings, and ABC wanted to continue airing the television series Desperate Housewives on Sunday nights. ABC would not air an NFL game again until they began simulcasting ESPN's Wild Card playoff game in January 2016.

Cris Collinsworth left Fox to sit out the 2005 season before joining NBC as a studio analyst the following year, leaving Fox's lead broadcasting team of Joe Buck and Troy Aikman in a two-man booth. It would also be Curt Menefee’s last season as a full time play by play announcer at FOX, before he became apart of the FOX NFL Sunday pregame show team, and occasionally would do play by play for games late in the season.

Former MVP Quarterback Rich Gannon joined the NFL on CBS as a color commentator following his retirement from the Oakland Raiders after a severe neck injury being on the #7 broadcast team. CBS also saw color commentator broadcasting changes in season as former 49ers tight end Brent Jones left the network following week 3 to pursue his business career after working with Gus Johnson since 1999, and Steve Tasker became Johnson’s partner again for the first time since 1998. With Tasker leaving Don Criqui to replace Jones after week 3, Steve Beuerlein became Criqui’s partner by week 6 as well as Criqui’s last season having a full time play by play role before being reduced to a part time role the following year. Verne Lundquist would call his final NFL game at CBS week 1 doing the Broncos Dolphins matchup.
