= 2006 AFC Divisional playoff game (New England–San Diego) =

Notable football game between the New England Patriots and San Diego Chargers

2006 New England Patriots-San Diego Chargers AFC Divisional playoff game
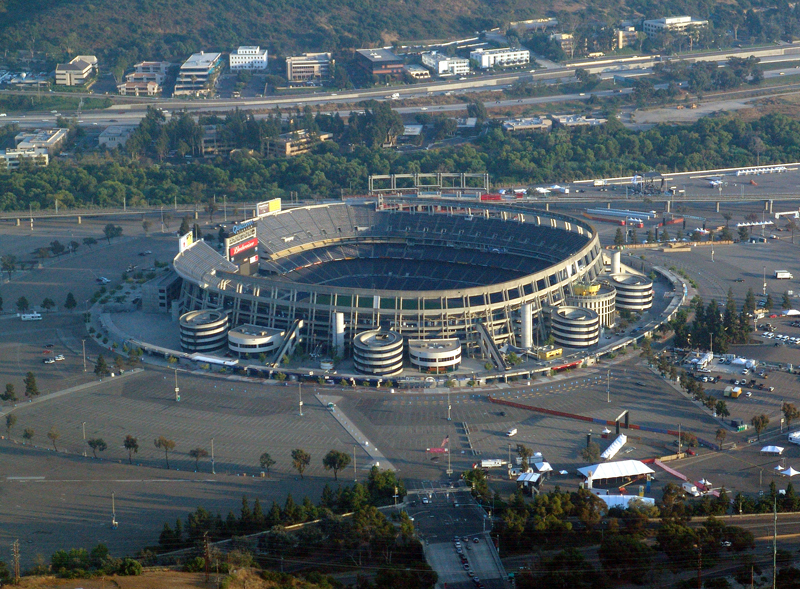
- Qualcomm Stadium, the site of the game.
| New England Patriots (4) (12–4) | San Diego Chargers (1) (14–2) |
|---|---|
| 24 | 21 |
| Head coach: Bill Belichick | Head coach: Marty Schottenheimer |
| | 1 | 2 | 3 | 4 | Total |
|---|---|---|---|---|---|
| NE | 3 | 7 | 3 | 11 | 24 |
| SD | 0 | 14 | 0 | 7 | 21 |
- Date: January 14, 2007
- Stadium: Qualcomm Stadium; San Diego, California
- Favorite: Chargers by 5
- Referee: Tony Corrente
- Attendance: 68,810

TV in the United States
- Network: CBS
- Announcers: Jim Nantz and Phil Simms

On January 14, 2007, the New England Patriots and the San Diego Chargers played an AFC Divisional Playoff game at Qualcomm Stadium in San Diego, California. The top-seed Chargers, owners of the NFL's best record outright for the first time ever, surrendered a fourth-quarter lead to the underdog Patriots and were eliminated in their playoff opener.

The game is remembered for a play that occurred midway through the 4th quarter. On 4th and 5 with 6:25 remaining and the Chargers leading 21–13, Patriots quarterback Tom Brady was intercepted at the Chargers' 30-yard line by safety Marlon McCree, only for McCree to be stripped of the ball shortly thereafter by wide receiver Troy Brown. Fellow wide receiver Reche Caldwell recovered the fumble, securing a new set of downs for the Patriots. The Patriots' reborn drive would end in a touchdown and ensuing two-point conversion, and the Patriots went on to win 24–21 after Chargers kicker Nate Kaeding missed a last-second 54-yard field goal.

== Background ==
The Patriots entered the playoffs as the No. 4 seed with a 12–4 record, while the Chargers entered the playoffs as the No. 1 seed with a 14–2 record.

The Patriots, coming off a relatively disappointing 2005 campaign after winning three of the previous four Super Bowls, entered as the fourth seed after clinching the AFC East, their third consecutive division title and fifth in six years. In the Wild Card round, they defeated the division rival New York Jets to advance to the AFC Divisional Playoff round.

The Chargers entered the playoffs as the No. 1 seed after clinching the AFC West division, earning a first round bye and home-field advantage throughout the AFC playoffs. Their 14–2 record was both a franchise-best and the best in the NFL. They went a perfect 8–0 at home and entered the playoffs riding a ten-game winning streak. They had 11 Pro Bowlers and six All-Pros, headlined by running back LaDainian Tomlinson, who posted one of the greatest seasons by a running back in NFL history, with 2,323 yards from scrimmage and 31 touchdowns (28 rushing, 3 receiving). Tomlinson's achievements resulted in him being named MVP by a significant margin, securing 44 of the AP's 50 first-place votes. Taking into account all of the Chargers' team achievements, many pegged them as the favorites to win the Super Bowl.

This was the second playoff meeting between the Chargers and Patriots, with the Chargers winning the only prior meeting in the 1963 AFL Championship Game 51–10.

== Game summary ==
New England Patriots vs. San Diego Chargers – Game summary

| Quarter | 1 | 2 | 3 | 4 | Total |
|---|---|---|---|---|---|
| Patriots | 3 | 7 | 3 | 11 | 24 |
| Chargers | 0 | 14 | 0 | 7 | 21 |

at Qualcomm Stadium, San Diego, California

- Game time: 4:30 p.m. EST/1:30 p.m. PST
- Game weather: 53 °F (12 °C), clear
- Game attendance: 68,810
- Referee: Tony Corrente
- TV announcers (CBS): Jim Nantz (play-by-play) and Phil Simms (color commentator)

Game information

1st Quarter

- NE – Stephen Gostkowski 50-yard field goal, 0:40. Patriots 3–0. Drive: 9 plays, 33 yards, 4:35.

2nd Quarter

- SD – LaDainian Tomlinson 2-yard run (Nate Kaeding kick), 7:19. Chargers 7–3. Drive: 9 plays, 48 yards, 4:31.
- SD – Michael Turner 6-yard run (Nate Kaeding kick), 2:04. Chargers 14–3. Drive: 4 plays, 77 yards, 2:23.
- NE – Jabar Gaffney 6-yard pass from Tom Brady (Stephen Gostkowski kick), 0:08. Chargers 14–10. Drive: 11 plays, 72 yards, 1:56.

3rd Quarter

- NE – Stephen Gostkowski 34-yard field goal, 2:11. Chargers 14–13. Drive: 7 plays, 15 yards, 3:09.

4th Quarter

- SD – LaDainian Tomlinson 3-yard run (Nate Kaeding kick), 8:35. Chargers 21–13. Drive: 9 plays, 83 yards, 4:44.
- NE – Reche Caldwell 4-yard pass from Tom Brady (Kevin Faulk run), 4:36. Tied 21–21. Drive: 5 plays, 32 yards, 1:40.
- NE – Stephen Gostkowski 31-yard field goal, 1:10. Patriots 24–21. Drive: 8 plays, 72 yards, 2:16.

The New England Patriots faced the San Diego Chargers, who were unbeaten at home in the regular season. The Chargers' roster included league MVP running back LaDainian Tomlinson, who broke several league records, nine Pro Bowlers, and five All-Pro players. However, four Chargers turnovers, three of which were converted into Patriots scoring drives, helped lead to a Chargers loss. San Diego lost despite outgaining the Patriots in rushing yards, 148–51 and total yards, 352–327, while also intercepting three passes from Tom Brady.

In the first quarter, after San Diego coach Marty Schottenheimer opted to go for it on fourth and 11 instead of attempting a 47-yard field goal, quarterback Philip Rivers lost a fumble while being sacked by Mike Vrabel, setting up Stephen Gostkowski's 51-yard field goal with 40 seconds left in the quarter. In the second quarter, Chargers receiver Eric Parker's 13-yard punt return set up a 48-yard scoring drive that ended with Tomlinson's 2-yard touchdown run, giving his team a 7–3 lead. Then, on the Patriots' next drive, linebacker Donnie Edwards intercepted a pass from Brady and returned it to the 41-yard line. But the Chargers ended up punting after Rivers was sacked on third down by defensive back Artrell Hawkins. Later in the quarter, Tomlinson rushed twice for 13 yards and took a screen pass 58 yards to the Patriots' 6-yard line, setting up a 6-yard touchdown run by Michael Turner with 2:04 left in the half. New England responded with a 72-yard scoring drive, with receiver Jabar Gaffney catching four passes for 46 yards, including a 7-yard touchdown reception with six seconds left in the half, cutting their deficit to 14–10.

In the second half, Brady threw his second interception of the game. But once again, the Chargers were forced to punt after Rivers was sacked on third down. Mike Scifres' 36-yard punt pinned New England back at their own 2-yard line, and San Diego subsequently forced a punt, but Parker muffed the kick and New England's David Thomas recovered the fumble at the Chargers' 31-yard line. New England's drive seemed to stall after Brady fumbled on third and 13. Patriots' tackle Matt Light recovered it and Chargers defensive back Drayton Florence drew a 15-yard unsportsmanlike conduct penalty for taunting Patriots tight end Daniel Graham. The drive continued and Gostkowski eventually kicked a 34-yard field goal to cut their deficit to 14–13. Then, on San Diego's next drive, linebacker Rosevelt Colvin intercepted a pass from Rivers at the New England 36-yard line. The Patriots then drove to the Chargers 41-yard line, but were halted there and had to punt. After the punt, Rivers completed two passes to tight end Antonio Gates for 31 yards and a 31-yard pass to Vincent Jackson, setting up Tomlinson's second rushing touchdown to give the Chargers an 8-point lead, 21–13.

New England responded by driving to San Diego's 41-yard line, setting up with what has been remembered as the decisive play of the game.

== The play ==
Facing a 4th and 5 with 6:25 remaining, Brady's pass was intercepted by Marlon McCree, but Troy Brown stripped the ball, and receiver Reche Caldwell recovered it. Schottenheimer unsuccessfully challenged the play and lost a timeout. Chargers players Lorenzo Neal and Nick Hardwick have stated that when McCree intercepted the ball, everyone on the Chargers' sideline yelled "Get down!" Discussing the momentum shift caused by the rapid back-and-forth change of possession, Brown stated that he was thinking "Yep, we're in business" when Caldwell came up with the ball.

Four plays later, Brady threw a 4-yard touchdown pass to Caldwell. On the next play, running back Kevin Faulk took a direct snap and scored the two-point conversion, tying the game. Then, after forcing a punt, Brady completed a 19-yard pass to Graham. Two plays later, Caldwell caught a 49-yard strike down the right sideline to set up Gostkowski's third field goal to give them a 24–21 lead with only 1:10 left in the fourth quarter. With no timeouts left, San Diego drove to the Patriots 36-yard line on their final possession, but Nate Kaeding's 54-yard field goal attempt fell short with three seconds remaining in the game.

== Aftermath ==
Immediately after Kaeding's miss, several Patriots players ran onto the field in celebration. A few Patriots turned toward the San Diego sideline and taunted them with celebrations. Linebacker Rosevelt Colvin clutched his throat as if choking himself. Defensive tackle Vince Wilfork did a mocking version of Merriman's “Lights Out” dance, the one in which the Chargers star linebacker reached up and toggled the light-switch tattoo on his forearm. Tomlinson particularly took offense with the mocking of the dance, stating "They showed no class at all. Absolutely no class. And maybe that comes from the head coach," said Tomlinson. Rivers was also furious, running over to a celebrating Ellis Hobbs and calling him "the sorriest cornerback in the league." The controversial celebration was a response to remarks made by Schottenheimer after the Chargers snapped the Patriots 21-game home winning streak in 2005 where he noted "I'll have to be honest. During the course of the week, I wondered, 'Is there a breaking point, where all of a sudden you can't find enough fingers to plug the dike?'," referencing the injuries the Patriots faced early in the 2005 season.

One month later, Schottenheimer was fired by San Diego, ending his 21-year coaching career. His 14–2 season with the Chargers was his best regular season record ever, and he is the only coach in NFL history to be fired after racking up 14 wins.

The Patriots would go on to lose the AFC Championship game 38–34 to the Indianapolis Colts, who went on to win Super Bowl XLI over the Chicago Bears.

The Patriots and Chargers would meet again in the AFC Championship Game the following season. With Rivers and Tomlinson playing through a torn ACL and sprained MCL respectively, the Patriots would once again defeat the Chargers 21–12, extending their quest for a 19–0 season, which would come to an end at the hands of the New York Giants in Super Bowl XLII.

The Chargers would leave San Diego after the 2016 season, moving to Los Angeles. Taking into consideration the quality of the team and the remaining opponents the Chargers would've had to face, many Chargers fans believe the 2006 team was the franchise's best chance to bring San Diego a Super Bowl championship. Had the Chargers beaten the Patriots, they would've hosted the eventual Super Bowl champion Colts, who they eliminated from the playoffs the following two seasons (the former victory coming despite the Chargers losing Rivers and Tomlinson to injury during the game) and a Bears team that was soundly defeated by the aforementioned Colts in the Super Bowl. Some have even gone as far to say that a championship would've kept the franchise from relocating.

== Starting lineups ==
| New England | Position | | San Diego |
|---|---|---|---|
Offense
| Tom Brady | QB | | Philip Rivers |
| Kevin Faulk | RB | | LaDainian Tomlinson |
| Jabar Gaffney | WR | | Eric Parker |
| Reche Caldwell | WR | | Vincent Jackson |
| Ben Watson | TE | | Antonio Gates |
| David Thomas | TE | | Brandon Manumaleuna |
| Matt Light | LT | | Marcus McNeill |
| Logan Mankins | LG | | Kris Dielman |
| Dan Koppen | C | | Nick Hardwick |
| Steve Neal | RG | | Mike Goff |
| Nick Kaczur | RT | | Shane Olivea |
Defense
| Ty Warren | LDE | | Luis Castillo |
| Vince Wilfork | NT | DT | Jamal Williams |
| Richard Seymour | RDE | | Igor Olshansky |
| Tully Banta-Cain | OLB | | Shawne Merriman |
| Rosevelt Colvin | OLB | | Shaun Phillips |
| Tedy Bruschi | ILB | | Randall Godfrey |
| Mike Vrabel | ILB | | Donnie Edwards |
| Asante Samuel | LCB | | Quentin Jammer |
| Ellis Hobbs | RCB | | Drayton Florence |
| James Sanders | SS | | Terrence Kiel |
| Artrell Hawkins | FS | | Marlon McCree |
Special teams
| Stephen Gostkowski | K | | Nate Kaeding |
| Todd Sauerbrun | P | | Mike Scifres |

== Officials ==
- Referee: Tony Corrente
- Umpire: Carl Paganelli
- Head linesman: Paul Weidner
- Line judge: Mark Steinkerchner
- Back judge: Steve Freeman
- Side judge: Michael Banks
- Field judge: Boris Cheek
