= Troy Brown =

American football player and coach (born 1971)

Personal information
- Born: July 2, 1971 (age 55); Barnwell, South Carolina, U.S.
- Listed height: 5 ft 10 in (1.78 m)
- Listed weight: 196 lb (89 kg)

Career information
- Position: Wide receiver (No. 80, 86)
- High school: Blackville–Hilda (Blackville, South Carolina)
- College: Lees–McRae (1989–1990); Marshall (1991–1992)
- NFL draft: 1993: 8th round, 198th overall pick

Career history

Playing
- New England Patriots (1993–2007)

Coaching
- New England Patriots (2020) Running backs coach & kick returners coach; New England Patriots (2021–2023) Wide receivers coach & kick returners coach; New England Patriots (2024) Skill development / Kick & punt returners coach; New York Giants (2025) Offensive assistant

Awards and highlights
- 3× Super Bowl champion (XXXVI, XXXVIII, XXXIX); Pro Bowl (2001); New England Patriots All-2000s Team; New England Patriots 50th Anniversary Team; New England Patriots All-Dynasty Team; New England Patriots Hall of Fame

Career NFL statistics
- Receptions: 557
- Receiving yards: 6,366
- Receiving touchdowns: 31
- Return yards: 4,487
- Return touchdowns: 3
- Interceptions: 3
- Stats at Pro Football Reference
- College Football Hall of Fame

Troy Fitzgerald Brown (born July 2, 1971) is an American professional football coach and former player who most recently served as an offensive assistant for the New York Giants of the National Football League (NFL). He played as a wide receiver and return specialist for 15 seasons in the NFL, spending his entire career with the Patriots. Brown played college football for the Marshall Thundering Herd and was selected by the Patriots in the eighth round of the 1993 NFL draft. During his New England tenure, he was selected to the Pro Bowl in 2001 and was a member of the franchise's first three Super Bowl-winning teams. In 2020, Brown rejoined the Patriots as an offensive assistant. He was inducted to the College Football Hall of Fame in 2010. Brown also was inducted to the Patriots Hall of Fame in 2012.

== Early life ==
Brown attended Blackville–Hilda High School in Blackville, South Carolina. He was discouraged from playing football, as he was thought to be too small, starting at the size of 5'6", 135 lbs. Still, he lettered in football and track and field. His high school football team won a state championship in 1988 with a 14–1 record.

== College career ==
Brown attended Lees–McRae College before it became a 4-year college, from 1989–1990. He then played for Marshall University from 1991–1992, where he was a standout wide receiver, punt returner, and kickoff returner, leading the Division I-AA in both kickoff and punt return average in 1991, a year in which he and quarterback Todd Donnan tied a record by combining for a 99-yard pass play against Virginia Military Institute. The following year, Marshall claimed its first national championship with Brown as its primary wide receiver and returner. In the championship game, Brown sealed the win by intercepting a Hail Mary Youngstown State pass in the final seconds of the game.

His career kickoff return average (29.69 yards per return) still stands as an NCAA record, as do his four kickoff returns for touchdowns. He scored one touchdown for every eight times he touched the football.

In 2006, Brown was given a distinguished alumni award by his alma mater, Marshall.

== Professional career ==
Brown was drafted by the Patriots out of Marshall in the eighth round of the 1993 NFL draft (198th overall). He was waived as a final cut in the 1994 pre-season by head coach Bill Parcells but was re-signed on October 19, 1994. It wasn't until the 1995 season that he started seeing time as a wide receiver, recording 14 catches for 159 yards. The next season in 1996, when the New England Patriots reached the Super Bowl, he recorded 21 catches for 222 yards. In 1997, he recorded 41 catches for 607 yards and 6 touchdowns despite being behind both Terry Glenn and Shawn Jefferson on the depth chart at receiver as well as competing with Ben Coates and Vincent Brisby for catches. In 1998, he resumed his duties as a punt returner.

His first year as a starter was 2000, when he recorded 83 catches for 944 yards and 4 touchdowns. In 2001 he, alongside Tom Brady, led the Patriots to their first ever Super Bowl championship, recording 101 catches during the season for 1,199 yards and 5 touchdowns, setting the franchise record for receptions and earning his first and only trip to the Pro Bowl. He also returned 29 punts for 413 yards and 2 touchdowns, giving him a league-leading 14.2 yards per return average. During the AFC Championship Game at Heinz Field against the Pittsburgh Steelers in the playoffs that season, Brown returned a crucial punt for a touchdown which provided the winning margin, adding to the two he returned for touchdowns during the regular season. He also scooped up a blocked field goal attempt in that game, and made a lateral pass to teammate Antwan Harris, which completed a second special teams touchdown. In 2002, he recorded 97 receptions for 890 yards and 3 touchdowns. In 2003, he had 40 catches for 472 yards, helping his team back to Super Bowl XXXVIII.

In 2004, he had only 17 receptions, but contributed in what was originally an emergency role on defense, ranking second on the team in interceptions with three. He was topped in this category only by Eugene Wilson. Further demonstrating his versatility, during the 2006 preseason he lined up as an emergency quarterback; when questioned as to why Brown had appeared there, the head coach of the Patriots, Bill Belichick, joked that he had lined Brown up there "to develop his legend".

Brown was released by the Patriots on March 1, 2005, for salary cap reasons, but he signed a new contract with them on May 23, 2005. He signed despite a better financial deal from the New Orleans Saints. In the 2005 season, he recorded 39 receptions for 466 yards.

On July 17, 2007, Brown reached an agreement with the New England Patriots for a 15th season, making him the second longest-playing Patriot at the time behind Steve Grogan; both have since been surpassed by Tom Brady. On July 28, he was placed on the physically unable to perform (PUP) list, but was activated on November 27.

In addition to playing offense and defense with success, Brown is the Patriots' all-time leading punt returner with 252 returns for 2,625 yards and 3 touchdowns. He is third all-time in Patriots history in receptions (557) and third all-time in receiving yards (6,366). He still holds the Super Bowl record for most punt returns in a career with 8.

Brown is the only player in NFL history with at least 550 receptions, 250 punt returns, and an interception.

=== 2006 AFC divisional playoffs ===
A memorable moment for Brown came in a 2006 AFC Divisional Playoff game, when the Patriots met the favored San Diego Chargers. With 5 minutes left in the game, the Patriots were down 21–13 and facing 4th and 5. Tom Brady threw his third interception of the game, to the Chargers' Marlon McCree. Brown, making what teammate Tedy Bruschi described as a "quick mental switch" from offensive to defensive player, instinctively ripped the ball out of McCree's grasp. The fumble was subsequently recovered by the Patriots Reche Caldwell, giving them a new set of downs. New England went on to tie the score with a touchdown and a two-point conversion, and then won the game on a 31-yard field goal. Brown also caught 5 passes for 39 yards in the game.

=== Legacy ===
Brown is a fan favorite among many Patriots fans due to his style of play and years of dedication to his team. His punt return in the 2001 AFC Championship along with numerous big plays throughout his Patriots career culminated in his induction into the Patriots Hall of Fame at Patriots Place.

=== Retirement ===
On March 13, 2008, The Boston Globe reported that the Patriots would not offer Brown a contract for the 2008 season. On September 25, 2008, Brown officially retired from professional football during a press conference alongside Patriots owner Robert Kraft and head coach Bill Belichick. He finished his playing career as the all-time leader for the New England Patriots in receptions with 557.

On June 4, 2012, it was announced that Brown was elected to the Patriots Hall of Fame by fan vote, beating out former head coach Bill Parcells and safety Fred Marion.

== Coaching career ==
=== New England Patriots ===
At the beginning of the 2019 NFL season, he began coaching in an unofficial capacity with the New England Patriots, assisting wide receivers coach Joe Judge, who was often busy with his other role as special teams coordinator. In addition in 2016 he was a part of the Bill Walsh Minority Coaching Fellowship working with the Patriots.

In 2020 it was officially announced that Brown was on the Patriots coaching staff. He would be serving as the teams running backs/kick returners coach.

In 2021, Brown was announced as the wide receivers/kick returners coach.

In 2024, Brown was moved to a skills development role.

=== New York Giants ===
In 2025, Brown was hired by the New York Giants as an offensive assistant.

== NFL career statistics ==
Legend
| | Super Bowl champion |
| | Led the league |
| **Bold** | Career high |

=== Regular season ===
| Year | Team | Games | | Receiving | | | | | Returning | | | | |
| Year | Team | GP | GS | Rec | Yds | Avg | Lng | TD | Ret | Yds | Avg | Lng | TD |
|---|---|---|---|---|---|---|---|---|---|---|---|---|---|
| 1993 | NE | 12 | 0 | 2 | 22 | 11.0 | 14 | 0 | 40 | 467 | 11.7 | 29 | 0 |
| 1994 | NE | 9 | 0 | 0 | 0 | 10.0 | 0 | 0 | 25 | 216 | 8.6 | 78 | 1 |
| 1995 | NE | **16** | 0 | 14 | 159 | 11.4 | 31 | 0 | 31 | 672 | 21.7 | 38 | 0 |
| 1996 | NE | **16** | 0 | 21 | 222 | 10.6 | 38 | 0 | 29 | 634 | **21.9** | 51 | 0 |
| 1997 | NE | **16** | 6 | 41 | 607 | 14.8 | 67 | **6** | – | – | – | – | – |
| 1998 | NE | 10 | 0 | 23 | 346 | **15.0** | 52 | 1 | 17 | 225 | 13.2 | 39 | 0 |
| 1999 | NE | 13 | 1 | 36 | 471 | 13.1 | 37 | 1 | **46** | **676** | 14.7 | 54 | 0 |
| 2000 | NE | **16** | **15** | 83 | 944 | 11.4 | 44 | 4 | 41 | 519 | 12.7 | 66 | 1 |
| 2001 | NE | **16** | 13 | **101** | **1,199** | 11.9 | 60 | 5 | 30 | 426 | 14.2 | **85** | **2** |
| 2002 | NE | 14 | 13 | 97 | 890 | 9.2 | 38 | 3 | 24 | 175 | 7.3 | 27 | 0 |
| 2003 | NE | 12 | 10 | 40 | 472 | 11.8 | **82** | 4 | 29 | 293 | 10.1 | 23 | 0 |
| 2004 | NE | 12 | 0 | 17 | 184 | 10.8 | 22 | 1 | 12 | 83 | 6.9 | 23 | 0 |
| 2005 | NE | 13 | 3 | 39 | 466 | 11.9 | 71 | 2 | 7 | 30 | 4.6 | 7 | 0 |
| 2006 | NE | **16** | 9 | 43 | 384 | 8.9 | 23 | 4 | 2 | 16 | 8.0 | 12 | 0 |
| 2007 | NE | 1 | 0 | Did not record any stats | | | | | | | | | |
| Career | | 192 | 70 | 557 | 6,366 | 11.4 | 82 | 31 | 339 | 4,487 | 13.2 | 85 | 4 |

=== Postseason ===
| Year | Team | Games | | Receiving | | | | | Returning | | | | |
| Year | Team | GP | GS | Rec | Yds | Avg | Lng | TD | Ret | Yds | Avg | Lng | TD |
|---|---|---|---|---|---|---|---|---|---|---|---|---|---|
| 1994 | NE | 1 | 0 | 0 | 0 | 10.0 | 0 | 0 | 2 | 5 | 2.5 | 5 | 0 |
| 1996 | NE | 2 | 0 | 0 | 0 | 0.0 | 0 | 0 | 2 | 54 | **27.0** | 29 | 0 |
| 1997 | NE | 2 | 0 | 3 | 38 | 12.7 | 24 | **1** | 1 | 0 | 0.0 | 0 | 0 |
| 1998 | NE | 1 | 0 | 4 | 46 | 11.5 | 21 | 0 | 4 | 27 | 6.8 | 17 | 0 |
| 2001 | NE | **3** | **3** | **18** | **253** | 14.1 | 29 | 0 | **10** | **148** | 14.8 | **55** | **1** |
| 2003 | NE | **3** | 2 | 17 | 175 | 10.3 | 18 | 0 | 7 | 81 | 11.6 | 28 | 0 |
| 2004 | NE | **3** | 1 | 5 | 41 | 8.2 | 12 | 0 | 7 | 46 | 6.6 | 20 | 0 |
| 2005 | NE | 2 | 1 | 2 | 44 | **22.0** | **33** | **1** | 1 | 0 | 0.0 | 0 | 0 |
| 2006 | NE | **3** | 1 | 9 | 97 | 10.8 | 27 | 0 | 4 | 39 | 9.8 | 16 | 0 |
| Career | | 20 | 8 | 58 | 694 | 12.0 | 33 | 2 | 38 | 400 | 10.5 | 55 | 1 |

== Post-playing career ==
=== Entertainment ===
Since 2008, Brown has been a football analyst with NBC Sports Boston. Brown, along with teammate Tom Brady, played himself on the Family Guy episode "Patriot Games". He also had a cameo in the 2012 film The Three Stooges, alongside Jerod Mayo.

=== Business ===
Brown is an investor in and spokesman for the Narragansett Brewing Company.

== Personal life ==
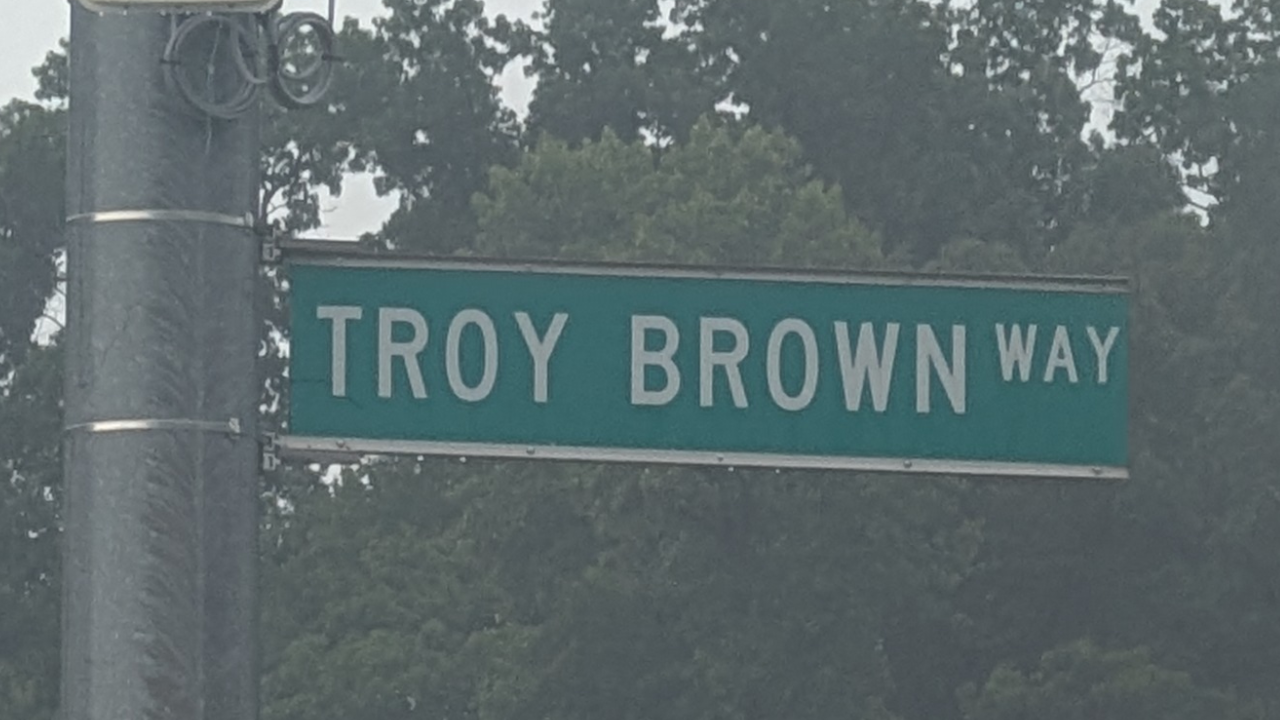
Troy Brown Way street sign in 2026.

Brown currently resides in Huntington, West Virginia, where a portion of West Virginia Route 10 was designated Troy Brown Way.

Brown and his ex-wife Kimberly (who works as a chemist for the United States Army Corps of Engineers), have two sons. He works with various charities through the Troy Brown Fantasy Football Camp. He also worked with the Bartrum Brown Football Camp from 2001 through 2011.
