= 2006–07 NFL playoffs =

American football tournament

- Dates: January 6 – February 4, 2007
- Season: 2006
- Teams: 12
- Games played: 11
- Super Bowl XLI site: Dolphin Stadium; Miami Gardens, Florida
- Defending champions: Pittsburgh Steelers (did not qualify)
- Champion: Indianapolis Colts (4th title)
- Runner-up: Chicago Bears
- Conference runners-up: New England Patriots; New Orleans Saints
NFL playoffs
← 2005–06	2007–08 →

The National Football League playoffs for the 2006 season began on January 6, 2007. The postseason tournament concluded with the Indianapolis Colts defeating the Chicago Bears in Super Bowl XLI, 29–17, on February 4, at Dolphin Stadium in Miami Gardens, Florida.

== Participants ==
Within each conference, the four division winners and the top two non-division winners with the best overall regular season records) qualified for the playoffs. The four division winners are seeded 1–4 based on their overall won-lost-tied record, and the wild card teams are seeded 5–6. The NFL does not use a fixed bracket playoff system, and there are no restrictions regarding teams from the same division matching up in any round. In the first round, dubbed the wild-card playoffs or wild-card weekend, the third-seeded division winner hosts the sixth-seed wild card, and the fourth seed hosts the fifth. The 1 and 2 seeds from each conference received a first-round bye. In the second round, the divisional playoffs, the number 1 seed hosts the worst-surviving seed from the first round (seed 4, 5, or 6), while the number 2 seed will play the other team (seed 3, 4, or 5). The two surviving teams from each conference's divisional playoff games met in the respective AFC and NFC Conference Championship games, hosted by the higher seed. Although the Super Bowl, the championship round of the playoffs, is played at a neutral site, the designated home team is based on an annual rotation by conference.

Playoff seeds
Seed	AFC	NFC
1	San Diego Chargers (West winner)	Chicago Bears (North winner)
2	Baltimore Ravens (North winner)	New Orleans Saints (South winner)
3	Indianapolis Colts (South winner)	Philadelphia Eagles (East winner)
4	New England Patriots (East winner)	Seattle Seahawks (West winner)
5	New York Jets (wild card)	Dallas Cowboys (wild card)
6	Kansas City Chiefs (wild card)	New York Giants (wild card)

== Bracket ==
Jan 7 – Gillette Stadium	Jan 14 – Qualcomm Stadium
5	NY Jets	16
4	New England	24
4	New England	37	Jan 21 – RCA Dome
1	San Diego	21
AFC
Jan 6 – RCA Dome	4	New England	34
Jan 13 – M&T Bank Stadium
3	Indianapolis	38
6	Kansas City	8	AFC Championship
3	Indianapolis	15
3	Indianapolis	23	Feb 4 – Dolphin Stadium
2	Baltimore	6
Wild-card round
Divisional round
Jan 7 – Lincoln Financial Field	A3	Indianapolis	29
Jan 13 – Louisiana Superdome
N1	Chicago	17
6	NY Giants	20	Super Bowl XLI
3	Philadelphia	24
3	Philadelphia	23	Jan 21 – Soldier Field
2	New Orleans	27
NFC
Jan 6 – Qwest Field	2	New Orleans	14
Jan 14 – Soldier Field
1	Chicago	39
5	Dallas	20	NFC Championship
4	Seattle	24
4	Seattle	21
1	Chicago	27*

* Indicates overtime victory

== Schedule ==
Under the new U.S. television broadcast contracts that took effect starting this season, NBC replaced ABC as the network televising the first two Wild Card playoff games. Fox then televised the rest of the NFC games. CBS broadcast the rest of the AFC playoff games and Super Bowl XLI.

Round	Away team	Score	Home team	Date	Kickoff (ET / UTC−5)	TV
Wild-card round	Kansas City Chiefs	8–23	Indianapolis Colts	January 6, 2007	4:30 p.m.	CBS
Wild-card round	Dallas Cowboys	20–21	Seattle Seahawks	January 6, 2007	8:00 p.m.	NBC
Wild-card round	New York Jets	16–37	New England Patriots	January 7, 2007	1:00 p.m.	CBS
Wild-card round	New York Giants	20–23	Philadelphia Eagles	January 7, 2007	4:30 p.m.	Fox
Divisional round	Indianapolis Colts	15–6	Baltimore Ravens	January 13, 2007	4:30 p.m.	CBS
Divisional round	Philadelphia Eagles	24–27	New Orleans Saints	January 13, 2007	8:00 p.m.	Fox
Divisional round	Seattle Seahawks	24–27 (OT)	Chicago Bears	January 14, 2007	1:00 p.m.	Fox
Divisional round	New England Patriots	24–21	San Diego Chargers	January 14, 2007	4:30 p.m.	CBS
Conference championships	New Orleans Saints	14–39	Chicago Bears	January 21, 2007	3:00 p.m.	Fox
Conference championships	New England Patriots	34–38	Indianapolis Colts	January 21, 2007	6:30 p.m.	CBS
Super Bowl XLI Dolphin Stadium Miami Gardens, Florida	Indianapolis Colts	29–17	Chicago Bears	February 4, 2007	6:30 p.m.	CBS

== Wild-card round ==
=== Saturday, January 6, 2007 ===
==== AFC: Indianapolis Colts 23, Kansas City Chiefs 8 ====
Kansas City Chiefs vs. Indianapolis Colts – Game summary

Quarter	1	2	3	4	Total
Chiefs	0	0	8	0	8
Colts	6	3	7	7	23

at RCA Dome, Indianapolis, Indiana

- Game time: 4:30 p.m. EST
- Game weather: Played indoors, domed stadium
- Game attendance: 57,310
- Referee: Jeff Triplette
- TV announcers (NBC): Tom Hammond (play-by-play), Cris Collinsworth (color commentator), and Bob Neumeier (sideline reporter)

Game information

1st Quarter

- IND – Adam Vinatieri 48-yard field goal, 8:41. Colts 3–0. Drive: 10 plays, 39 yards, 4:51.
- IND – Adam Vinatieri 19-yard field goal, 2:09. Colts 6–0. Drive: 10 plays, 68 yards, 4:57.

2nd Quarter

- IND – Adam Vinatieri 50-yard field goal, 0:00. Colts 9–0. Drive: 6 plays, 33 yards, 0:50.

3rd Quarter

- IND – Joseph Addai 6-yard run (Vinatieri kick), 4:14. Colts 16–0. Drive: 12 plays, 89 yards, 6:56.
- KC – Tony Gonzalez 6-yard pass from Trent Green (Kris Wilson pass from Trent Green), 0:08. Colts 16–8. Drive: 8 plays, 60 yards, 4:06.

4th Quarter

- IND – Reggie Wayne 5-yard pass from Peyton Manning (Adam Vinatieri kick), 10:16. Colts 23–8. Drive: 9 plays, 71 yards, 4:52.

Top passers

- KC – Trent Green – 14/24, 107 yards, TD, 2 INT
- IND – Peyton Manning – 30/38, 268 yards, TD, 3 INT

Top rushers

- KC – Larry Johnson – 13 rushes, 32 yards
- IND – Joseph Addai – 25 rushes, 122 yards, TD

Top receivers

- KC – Kris Wilson – 2 receptions, 29 yards
- IND – Dallas Clark – 9 receptions, 103 yards

Despite quarterback Peyton Manning's three interceptions, the Indianapolis Colts out-gained the Kansas City Chiefs in total yards, 435–126, and first downs, 23–8. Indianapolis's defense forced three turnovers, four sacks, and prevented Kansas City from gaining a single first down until late in the third quarter. The game was never in question despite Manning's turnovers as Indianapolis dominated Kansas City from start to finish to earn a trip to Baltimore.

The Colts opened up the scoring on their first drive of the game with Adam Vinatieri's 48-yard field goal. The next time they had the ball, they drove 68 yards to the Kansas City 2-yard line, but had to settle for another Vinatieri field goal to give them a 6–0 lead. After another Kansas City punt, Chiefs cornerback Ty Law intercepted a pass from Manning and returned it 43 yards to the Colts 9-yard line. But Kansas City failed to get the ball into the end zone with three rushing attempts and came up empty when Lawrence Tynes' 23-yard field goal attempt hit the left upright. After another interception thrown by Manning and another Kansas City punt, the Colts increased their lead to 9–0 by driving 33 yards and scoring on Vinatieri's 50-yard field goal on the last play of the first half. The Chiefs ended the half with 16 total yards and no first downs. This was the first time in the modern era (post AFL–NFL merger) and the first time since 1960 that an NFL team had been held without an offensive first down in the first half of a playoff game.

On the Colts' opening possession of the second half, Manning threw his third interception of the game (and his second to Law), but the Chiefs could not take advantage of the turnover and had to punt. Indianapolis then drove 89 yards in 12 plays and scored with Joseph Addai's 6-yard touchdown run, giving them a 16–0 lead.

Kansas City got their first first down of the game on their ensuing possession, driving 60 yards in eight plays. Trent Green finished the drive with a 6-yard touchdown pass to tight end Tony Gonzalez, and then completed a pass to tight end Kris Wilson for a successful two-point conversion to cut their deficit to within one touchdown, 16–8. However, the Colts increased their lead to 23–8 on a 71-yard, 9-play drive ending with Reggie Wayne's 5-yard touchdown reception. Indianapolis's defense forced three turnovers on the Chiefs' last three drives to clinch the victory.

This was the third postseason meeting between the Chiefs and Colts, with Indianapolis winning both times in Kansas City, the most recent being 38–31 in the 2003 AFC Divisional playoffs.

Previous playoff games
Indianapolis leads 2–0 in all-time playoff games

1996

Indianapolis Colts 10 @ Kansas City Chiefs 7

1995 AFC Divisional playoffs

2003

Indianapolis Colts 38 @ Kansas City Chiefs 31

2003 AFC Divisional playoffs

==== NFC: Seattle Seahawks 21, Dallas Cowboys 20 ====
Dallas Cowboys vs. Seattle Seahawks – Game summary

Quarter	1	2	3	4	Total
Cowboys	3	7	7	3	20
Seahawks	3	3	7	8	21

at Qwest Field, Seattle, Washington

- Game time: 8:00 p.m. EST/5:00 p.m. PST
- Game weather: 44 °F (7 °C), overcast
- Game attendance: 68,058
- Referee: Walt Anderson
- TV announcers (NBC): Al Michaels (play-by-play), John Madden (color commentator), and Andrea Kremer (sideline reporter)

Game information

1st Quarter

- SEA – Josh Brown 23-yard field goal, 11:13. Seahawks 3–0. Drive: 9 plays, 55 yards, 3:47.
- DAL – Martín Gramática 50-yard field goal, 4:50. Tied 3–3. Drive: 5 plays, 11 yards, 2:21.

2nd Quarter

- SEA – Josh Brown 30-yard field goal, 8:28. Seahawks 6–3. Drive: 13 plays, 54 yards, 5:14.
- DAL – Patrick Crayton 13-yard pass from Tony Romo (Martin Gramática kick), 0:11. Cowboys 10–6. Drive: 10 plays, 76 yards, 5:03.

3rd Quarter

- SEA – Jerramy Stevens 15-yard pass from Matt Hasselbeck (Brown kick), 6:08. Seahawks 13–10. Drive: 12 plays, 62 yards, 6:45.
- DAL – Miles Austin 93-yard kickoff return (Martin Gramática kick), 5:57. Cowboys 17–13.

4th Quarter

- DAL – Martín Gramática 29-yard field goal, 10:15. Cowboys 20–13. Drive: 8 plays, 46 yards, 4:26.
- SEA – Safety, Terry Glenn fumbled out of own end zone, 6:32. Cowboys 20–15.
- SEA – Jerramy Stevens 37-yard pass from Matt Hasselbeck (2-point try failed), 4:24. Seahawks 21–20. Drive: 4 plays, 50 yards, 2:08.

Top passers

- DAL – Tony Romo – 17/29, 189 yards, TD
- SEA – Matt Hasselbeck – 18/36, 240 yards, 2 TD, 2 INT

Top rushers

- DAL – Julius Jones – 22 rushes, 112 yards
- SEA – Shaun Alexander – 24 rushes, 69 yards

Top receivers

- DAL – Jason Witten – 3 receptions, 57 yards
- SEA – Bobby Engram – 4 receptions, 88 yards

Dallas Cowboys' quarterback Tony Romo, a four-year veteran who earned the starting job and made the Pro Bowl for the first time in his career during the regular season, botched the hold on a potential game-winning field goal with 1:19 left in the fourth quarter, allowing the Seattle Seahawks to escape with a victory.

Taking advantage of Dallas kicker Martín Gramática's opening kickoff, which went out-of-bounds and gave Seattle the ball at their own 40, the Seahawks marched down the field on their opening drive and scored with Josh Brown's 23-yard field goal. Dallas was forced to punt on their ensuing possession, but Cowboys cornerback Anthony Henry intercepted Seattle's next pass and returned it to the Seahawks 43-yard line, setting up Gramatica's 50-yard field goal to tie the game.

Early in the second quarter, Seattle drove 54 yards and retook the lead with Brown's second field goal of the game. After an exchange of punts, the Cowboys took the lead. Aided by Jason Witten's 32-yard reception, Dallas drove 76 yards in ten plays and scored on Romo's 12-yard touchdown pass to Patrick Crayton with only 11 seconds left in the half, giving the Cowboys a 10–6 lead. In the third quarter, Seattle drove 62 yards in 12 plays, featuring two fourth-down conversions by running back Shaun Alexander, and scored with Matt Hasselbeck's 15-yard touchdown pass to Jerramy Stevens, giving them a 13–10 lead. However, Dallas promptly took the lead right back after Miles Austin returned the ensuing kickoff 93 yards for a touchdown.

Early in the final quarter, Dallas safety Roy Williams intercepted a pass from Hasselbeck at the Cowboys 43-yard line. Eight plays later, Gramatica kicked a 29-yard field goal to increase his team's lead to 20–13. On Seattle's ensuing drive, a pass interference penalty on Dallas's Terence Newman gave them a first down on the 1-yard line. But Seattle failed to get into the end zone with their next four plays, turning the ball over on downs at the 2-yard line. On the first Dallas play after the turnover, Cowboys receiver Terry Glenn caught a short pass, but then lost a fumble. The ball was recovered by Seattle in the end zone for a touchdown, but after a Dallas challenge the referee ruled the play a safety, cutting the score to 20–15 and giving the ball back to the Seahawks at around the 50-yard line after the ensuing free kick and return. Four plays later, Hasselbeck's 37-yard touchdown pass to Stevens gave Seattle a 21–20 lead. The Seahawks attempted a two-point conversion to give themselves a three-point lead, but Hasselbeck's pass failed.

Dallas took the ensuing kickoff and marched down to the Seahawks' 8-yard line. On third down and 7 from there, Witten caught a pass that was initially ruled a first down on the 1-yard line, but after an instant-replay challenge, officials ruled Witten had been tackled at the 2-yard line, bringing up fourth down. With 1:19 left in the game, Gramatica lined up to attempt a 19-yard field goal, but Romo dropped the ball while setting it up for a hold. Romo picked up the fumble and ran with it, trying for either a touchdown or a first down, but he was tackled at the 2-yard line by safety Jordan Babineaux, turning the ball over on downs and allowing Seattle to run the clock down to eight seconds before punting back to Dallas. On the last play of the game, Romo's Hail Mary pass fell incomplete in the end zone.

"I know how hard everyone in that locker room worked to get themselves in position to win that game today and for it to end like that, and for me to be the cause is very tough to swallow right now", Romo said after the game. "I take responsibility for messing up at the end there. That's my fault. I cost the Dallas Cowboys a playoff win, and it's going to sit with me a long time. I don't know if I have ever felt this low."

This was the final game in the Hall of Fame coaching career of Bill Parcells, who resigned his position with the Cowboys two weeks later. Parcells would later take a front office position with the Miami Dolphins but never returned to the sidelines.

This was the first postseason meeting between the Cowboys and Seahawks.

=== Sunday, January 7, 2007 ===
==== AFC: New England Patriots 37, New York Jets 16 ====
New York Jets vs. New England Patriots – Game summary

Quarter	1	2	3	4	Total
Jets	3	7	3	3	16
Patriots	7	10	6	14	37

at Gillette Stadium, Foxborough, Massachusetts

- Game time: 1:00 p.m. EST
- Game weather: 50 °F (10 °C), sunny
- Game attendance: 68,756
- Referee: Bill Vinovich
- TV announcers (CBS): Jim Nantz (play-by-play) and Phil Simms (color commentator)

Game information

1st Quarter

- NE – Corey Dillon 11-yard run (Stephen Gostkowski kick), 11:53. Patriots 7–0. Drive: 10 plays, 65 yards, 3:07.
- NYJ – Mike Nugent 28-yard field goal, 2:36. Patriots 7–3. Drive: 4 plays, 5 yards, 1:30.

2nd Quarter

- NYJ – Jerricho Cotchery 77-yard pass from Chad Pennington (Mike Nugent kick), 14:45. Jets 10–7. Drive: 3 plays, 80 yards, 0:17.
- NE – Stephen Gostkowski 20-yard field goal, 10:57. Tied 10–10. Drive: 10 plays, 56 yards, 3:48.
- NE – Daniel Graham 1-yard pass from Tom Brady (Stephen Gostkowski kick), 0:11. Patriots 17–10. Drive: 15 plays, 80 yards, 6:54.

3rd Quarter

- NYJ – Mike Nugent 21-yard field goal, 8:19. Patriots 17–13. Drive: 13 plays, 73 yards, 6:41.
- NE – Stephen Gostkowski 40-yard field goal, 4:22. Patriots 20–13. Drive: 8 plays, 52 yards, 3:57.
- NE – Stephen Gostkowski 28-yard field goal, 0:04. Patriots 23–13. Drive: 4 plays, 5 yards, 1:39.

4th Quarter

- NYJ – Mike Nugent 37-yard field goal, 11:39. Patriots 23–16. Drive: 8 plays, 61 yards, 3:25.
- NE – Kevin Faulk 7-yard pass from Tom Brady (Stephen Gostkowski kick), 5:16. Patriots 30–16. Drive: 13 plays, 63 yards, 6:23.
- NE – Asante Samuel 36-yard interception return (Stephen Gostkowski kick), 4:54. Patriots 37–16.

Top passers

- NYJ – Chad Pennington – 23/40, 300 yards, TD, INT
- NE – Tom Brady – 22/34, 212 yards, 2 TD

Top rushers

- NYJ – Leon Washington – 11 rushes, 50 yards
- NE – Laurence Maroney – 18 rushes, 69 yards

Top receivers

- NYJ – Jerricho Cotchery – 4 receptions, 100 yards, TD
- NE – Jabar Gaffney – 8 receptions, 104 yards

Tom Brady completed 22 out of 34 passes for 212 yards and two touchdowns, while New England Patriots running backs Corey Dillon, Laurence Maroney, and Kevin Faulk combined for 145 rushing yards in a win over the New York Jets. Receiver Jabar Gaffney, who caught only 11 passes during the season, finished his first career playoff game with eight catches for 104 yards.

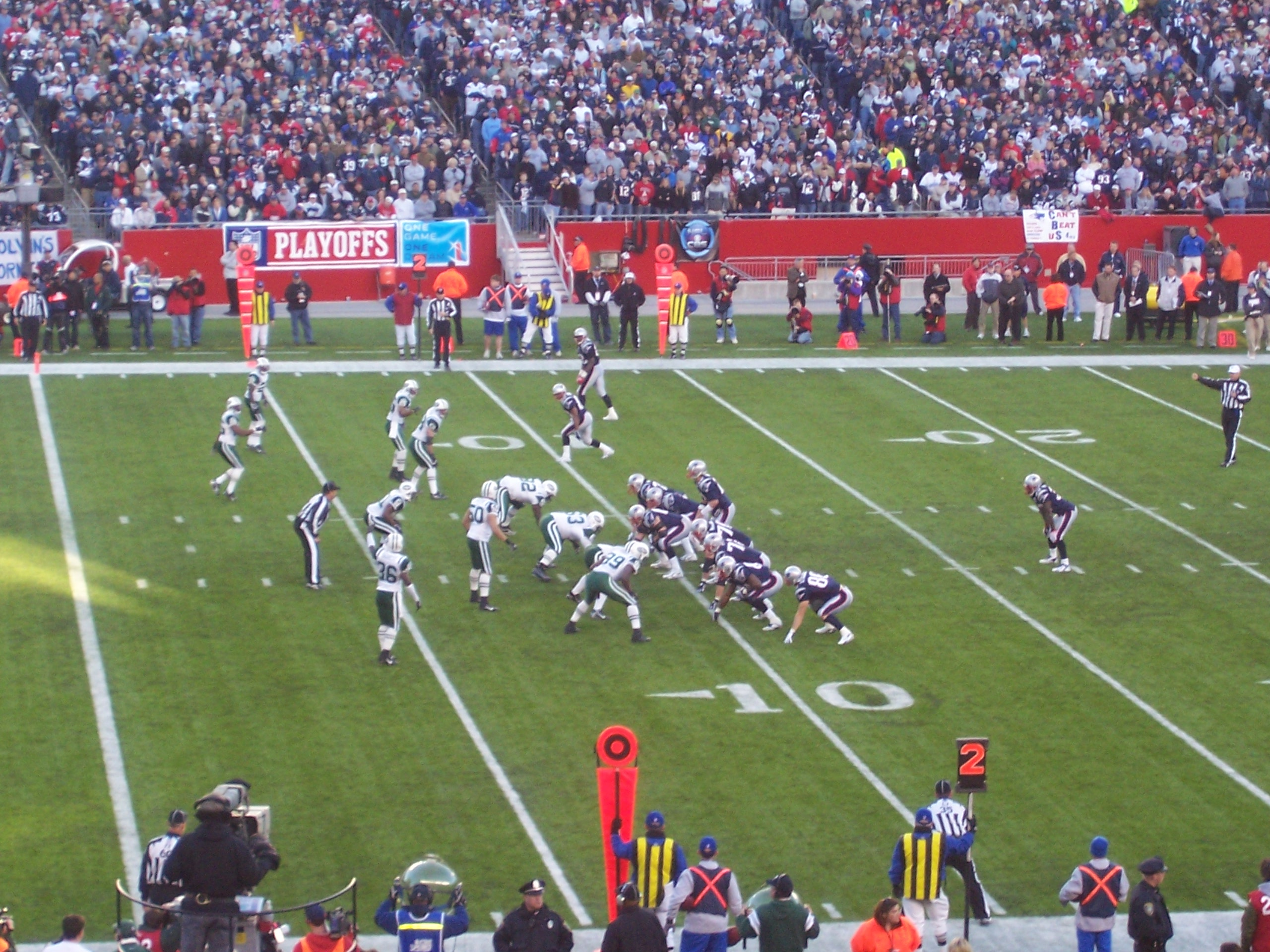
New England vs. New York Jets in the wild card playoff game

New England took the opening kickoff and drove down the field, with Gaffney catching three passes for 34 yards on a 65 yard-drive that ended with Dillon's 11-yard touchdown run. Later in the quarter, Hank Poteat recovered a fumble from Dillon on the Patriots 15-yard line, setting up Mike Nugent's 28-yard field goal to cut their deficit to 7–3. On their first possession of the second quarter, the Jets took a 10–7 lead after receiver Jerricho Cotchery (who finished with 100 receiving yards and 19 rushing yards) caught a pass from Chad Pennington and took it 77 yards for a touchdown. However, New England countered with Stephen Gostkowski's 20-yard field goal on their next drive to tie the game. Then, after forcing the Jets to punt, the Patriots marched to New York's 1-yard line. On third down with 11 seconds remaining in the half and no timeouts left, Brady took the snap, faked a handoff to Dillon, and then hit tight end Daniel Graham in the back of the end zone for a touchdown to give them a 17–10 halftime lead.

Nugent kicked a field goal on the Jets' opening drive of the second half, but New England responded with another field goal from Gostkowski to retake their 7-point lead. On the Jets' ensuing possession, linebacker Rosevelt Colvin deflected a lateral from Pennington behind the line of scrimmage. Most of the players on both teams (including Colvin) thought the lateral was an incomplete forward pass and the play was over, but New England's Vince Wilfork realized the play was still ongoing and recovered the fumble. After picking up the ball, Wilfork ran 31 yards to the Jets 15-yard line before being tackled by Cotchery, setting up Gostkowski's third field goal to make the score 23–13.

Early in the fourth quarter, Nugent kicked his third field goal to cut New York's deficit back to within a touchdown, 23–16. However, the Patriots responded with a 13-play, 63-yard drive that took 6:23 off the clock and ended with Brady's 7-yard touchdown pass to Faulk. Then on the first play of the Jets' ensuing drive, Asante Samuel put the game away by intercepting Pennington's pass and returning it 36 yards for a touchdown.

This was the Patriots' most recent win in the wild-card round until the 2025–26 playoffs.

This was the second postseason meeting between the Jets and Patriots, with New England winning the prior meeting 26–14 in the 1985 AFC Wild Card playoffs.

Previous playoff games
New England leads 1–0 in all-time playoff games

1985

New England Patriots 26 @ New York Jets 14

1985 AFC Wild Card playoffs

==== NFC: Philadelphia Eagles 23, New York Giants 20 ====
New York Giants vs. Philadelphia Eagles – Game summary

Quarter	1	2	3	4	Total
Giants	7	3	0	10	20
Eagles	0	17	3	3	23

at Lincoln Financial Field, Philadelphia, Pennsylvania

- Game time: 4:30 p.m. EST
- Game weather: 52 °F (11 °C), mostly cloudy
- Game attendance: 69,064
- Referee: Pete Morelli
- TV announcers (Fox): Joe Buck (play-by-play), Troy Aikman (color commentator), Pam Oliver, and Chris Myers (sideline reporters)

Game information

1st Quarter

- NYG – Plaxico Burress 17-yard pass from Eli Manning (Jay Feely kick), 11:44. Giants 7–0. Drive: 7 plays, 67 yards, 3:16.

2nd Quarter

- PHI – Brian Westbrook 49-yard run (David Akers kick), 14:11. Tied 7–7. Drive: 7 plays, 84 yards, 2:47.
- PHI – David Akers 19-yard field goal, 9:34. Eagles 10–7. Drive: 7 plays, 36 yards, 2:59.
- NYG – Jay Feely 20-yard field goal, 4:45. Tied 10–10. Drive: 11 plays, 78 yards, 4:49.
- PHI – Donté Stallworth 28-yard pass from Jeff Garcia (David Akers kick), 1:01. Eagles 17–10. Drive: 10 plays, 80 yards, 3:44.

3rd Quarter

- PHI – David Akers 48-yard field goal, 2:37. Eagles 20–10. Drive: 10 plays, 45 yards, 4:35.

4th Quarter

- NYG – Jay Feely 24-yard field goal, 14:49. Eagles 20–13. Drive: 7 plays, 65 yards, 2:47.
- NYG – Plaxico Burress 11-yard pass from Eli Manning (Jay Feely kick), 5:04. Tied 20–20. Drive: 13 plays, 80 yards, 7:09.
- PHI – David Akers 38-yard field goal, 0:00. Eagles 23–20. Drive: 10 plays, 46 yards, 4:57.

Top passers

- NYG – Eli Manning – 16/27, 161 yards, 2 TD, INT
- PHI – Jeff Garcia – 17/31, 153 yards, TD

Top rushers

- NYG – Tiki Barber – 26 rushes, 137 yards
- PHI – Brian Westbrook – 20 rushes, 141 yards, TD

Top receivers

- NYG – Plaxico Burress – 5 receptions, 89 yards, 2 TD
- PHI – Reggie Brown – 7 receptions, 73 yards

Philadelphia built up a 20–10 fourth quarter lead and thwarted a late Giants comeback attempt, winning on a 38-yard field goal by David Akers on the last play of the game.

New York took the opening kickoff and scored quickly, driving 67 yards in seven plays and scoring with Eli Manning's 17-yard touchdown pass to Plaxico Burress only 3:12 into the game. All of the remaining drives of the first quarter ended in punts, but early in the second quarter, Eagles running back Brian Westbrook's 49-yard touchdown run tied the game at seven. Two plays after the ensuing kickoff, Philadelphia cornerback Sheldon Brown intercepted a pass from Manning and returned it to the Giants 37-yard line, setting up a 19-yard field goal by Akers to take a 10–7 lead. On New York's ensuing possession, a 41-yard run by halfback Tiki Barber sparked a 78-yard drive capped by Jay Feely's 20-yard field goal to tie the game with 4:45 left in the half. Philadelphia responded, with quarterback Jeff Garcia leading the Eagles down the field 80 yards in ten plays and finishing it off with a 28-yard touchdown pass to Donté Stallworth, giving his team a 17–10 halftime lead.

Two penalties by the Eagles in the second half allowed the Giants to stay close. Late in the third quarter, an illegal block-in-the-back by rookie Tank Daniels nullified Westbrook's second touchdown of the game, which came on a 65-yard punt return. The Eagles still managed to score on their drive with a 48-yard field goal by Akers, increasing their lead to 20–10. The second penalty, a 47-yard pass interference call against Brown, came on the Giants' next possession giving the Giants offense the ball at the Philadelphia 14. The Eagles' defense dug in and forced the Giants to settle for Feely's second field goal of the game from 24 yards out, leaving the Giants down only one touchdown early in the fourth quarter.

Later in the quarter, the Giants drove to the Eagles 23-yard line. Two false starts and a holding penalty pushed them back to the 43, but Manning overcame the situation by completing three passes to Burress; the first went for 18 yards and the second for 14 and a first down, before the third, an 11-yard strike, found Burress in the end zone for his second touchdown of the game that tied the score with 5:04 to play. Philadelphia responded by driving 46 yards in ten plays, including a first down rush by Westbrook, allowing the Eagles to take the clock all the way down to three seconds before calling on Akers to kick a 38-yard field goal as time expired.

In the final game of his career, Barber rushed for a career postseason high 137 yards and caught two passes for 15 yards. Westbrook rushed for 141 yards and a touchdown and caught two passes for 12 yards.

This was the third postseason meeting between the Giants and Eagles. New York won both prior meetings, with the most recent coming in the 2000 NFC Divisional playoffs and ended with a 20–10 final.

Previous playoff games
New York leads 2–0 in all-time playoff games

1981

New York Giants 27 @ Philadelphia Eagles 21

1981 NFC Wild Card playoffs

2000

Philadelphia Eagles 10 @ New York Giants 20

2000 NFC Divisional playoffs

== Divisional round ==
=== Saturday, January 13, 2007 ===
==== AFC: Indianapolis Colts 15, Baltimore Ravens 6 ====
Indianapolis Colts vs. Baltimore Ravens – Game summary

Quarter	1	2	3	4	Total
Colts	6	3	3	3	15
Ravens	0	3	0	3	6

at M&T Bank Stadium, Baltimore, Maryland

- Game time: 4:30 p.m. EST
- Game weather: 63 °F (17 °C), light rain, cloudy
- Game attendance: 71,962
- Referee: Bill Leavy
- TV announcers (CBS): Greg Gumbel (play-by-play) and Dan Dierdorf (color commentator)

Game information

1st Quarter

- IND – Adam Vinatieri 23-yard field goal, 8:04. Colts 3–0. Drive: 11 plays, 49 yards, 4:43.
- IND – Adam Vinatieri 42-yard field goal, 5:36. Colts 6–0. Drive: 4 plays, 8 yards, 1:38.

2nd Quarter

- BAL – Matt Stover 40-yard field goal, 14:56. Colts 6–3. Drive: 5 plays, 19 yards, 2:15.
- IND – Adam Vinatieri 51-yard field goal, 3:15. Colts 9–3. Drive: 13 plays, 65 yards, 6:00.

3rd Quarter

- IND – Adam Vinatieri 48-yard field goal, 10:57. Colts 12–3. Drive: 9 plays, 54 yards, 4:03.

4th Quarter

- BAL – Matt Stover 51-yard field goal, 13:03. Colts 12–6. Drive: 11 plays, 62 yards, 7:46.
- IND – Adam Vinatieri 35-yard field goal, 0:23. Colts 15–6. Drive: 13 plays, 47 yards, 7:16.

Top passers

- IND – Peyton Manning – 15/30, 170 yards, 2 INT
- BAL – Steve McNair – 18/29, 173 yards, 2 INT

Top rushers

- IND – Dominic Rhodes – 14 rushes, 56 yards
- BAL – Jamal Lewis – 13 rushes, 53 yards

Top receivers

- IND – Reggie Wayne – 5 receptions, 51 yards
- BAL – Mark Clayton – 6 receptions, 73 yards

Adam Vinatieri's five field goals boosted the Colts to victory over the Ravens in the first NFL playoff game without a touchdown since the 1979 NFC Championship Game.

Indianapolis forced the Ravens to punt on their opening possession, and Terrence Wilkins gave them good field position with a 21-yard return to their 46-yard line. The Colts subsequently drove to Baltimore's 5-yard line where Vinatieri kicked a field goal to give them a 3–0 lead. On the second play of the Ravens' next drive, Indianapolis linebacker Gary Brackett recovered a fumble from tight end Todd Heap at the Baltimore 31-yard line, setting up another Vinatieri field goal to make the score 6–0.

Later in the quarter, Cory Ross' 18-yard punt return gave the Ravens a first down on the Colts' 42-yard line. Six plays later, Matt Stover kicked a 40-yard field goal on the first play of the second quarter to cut their deficit to 6–3. Two plays after the ensuing kickoff, Baltimore safety Ed Reed intercepted a pass from Peyton Manning at the Ravens' 45-yard line. Baltimore subsequently moved to the ball to the Colts' 4-yard line, but then gave it back when Steve McNair's third-down pass was intercepted by Antoine Bethea. Following the turnover, the Colts marched 63 yards in 13 plays and scored with Vinatieri's third field goal, which hit the cross bar and bounced through the uprights, to give them a 9–3 halftime lead.

Indianapolis took the second half kickoff and drove 54 yards, featuring a 27-yard catch by tight end Dallas Clark. Vinatieri finished the drive with a 48-yard field goal to increase their lead to 12–3. After an exchange of punts, the Ravens cut the score to 12–6 by driving 62 yards and scoring on a 51-yard field goal from Stover. Then, on the third play of the Colts' ensuing possession, Reed recorded his second interception from Manning, giving his team a first down on their 39-yard line. However, just like his previous pick, the Ravens could not take advantage of the turnover. Five plays later, McNair's pass was intercepted by Nick Harper.

After each team punted once, the Colts put the game away with a 47-yard drive that took 7:16 off the clock and included three successful third down conversions. Vinatieri finished the drive with his fifth field goal, giving Indianapolis a 15–6 lead with only 23 seconds left in regulation. Colts defensive end Robert Mathis then sealed the victory by forcing and recovering a fumble from McNair on the Ravens' final play.

The game had added significance to many Baltimore fans, due to the circumstances of the Colts' departure from Baltimore 23 years earlier. The Indianapolis Colts advanced to their second AFC Championship Game in four years. It was the third consecutive playoff defeat for the Ravens.

This was the first postseason meeting between the Colts and Ravens.

==== NFC: New Orleans Saints 27, Philadelphia Eagles 24 ====
Philadelphia Eagles vs. New Orleans Saints – Game summary

Quarter	1	2	3	4	Total
Eagles	0	14	7	3	24
Saints	3	10	14	0	27

at Louisiana Superdome, New Orleans, Louisiana

- Game time: 8:00 p.m. EST/7:00 p.m. CST
- Game weather: Played indoors, domed stadium
- Game attendance: 70,001
- Referee: Mike Carey
- TV announcers (Fox): Dick Stockton (play-by-play), Daryl Johnston (color commentator), and Tony Siragusa (sideline reporter)

Game information

1st Quarter

- NO – John Carney 33-yard field goal, 9:24. Saints 3–0. Drive: 5 plays, 35 yards, 2:05.

2nd Quarter

- NO – John Carney 23-yard field goal, 14:46. Saints 6–0. Drive: 6 plays, 59 yards, 1:33.
- PHI – Donté Stallworth 75-yard pass from Jeff Garcia (David Akers kick), 13:38. Eagles 7–6. Drive: 3 plays, 76 yards, 1:08.
- NO – Reggie Bush 4-yard run (John Carney kick), 5:19. Saints 13–7. Drive: 14 plays, 78 yards, 8:19.
- PHI – Brian Westbrook 1-yard run (David Akers kick), 0:50. Eagles 14–13. Drive: 11 plays, 80 yards, 4:29.

3rd Quarter

- PHI – Brian Westbrook 62-yard run (David Akers kick), 13:25. Eagles 21–13. Drive: 3 plays, 80 yards, 1:35.
- NO – Deuce McAllister 5-yard run (John Carney kick), 9:36. Eagles 21–20. Drive: 7 plays, 63 yards, 3:49.
- NO – Deuce McAllister 11-yard pass from Drew Brees (John Carney kick), 1:05. Saints 27–21. Drive: 9 plays, 84 yards, 6:21.

4th Quarter

- PHI – David Akers 24-yard field goal, 11:08. Saints 27–24. Drive: 9 plays, 64 yards, 4:50.

Top passers

- PHI – Jeff Garcia – 15/30, 240 yards, TD
- NO – Drew Brees – 20/32, 243 yards, TD

Top rushers

- PHI – Brian Westbrook – 26 rushes, 116 yards, 2 TD
- NO – Deuce McAllister – 21 rushes, 143 yards, TD

Top receivers

- PHI – Donte' Stallworth – 3 receptions, 100 yards, TD
- NO – Billy Miller – 4 receptions, 64 yards

The Saints gained 208 rushing yards and 435 total yards, both postseason franchise records, along with 158 return yards on special teams en route to a 27–24 victory over the Eagles, allowing them to advance to the conference championship game for the first time in the team's 40-year history.

In the first quarter, a 28-yard run from New Orleans' Deuce McAllister set up a 33-yard field goal from John Carney to open up the scoring. Later in the quarter, two big plays from the Saints, a 25-yard run by Reggie Bush and a 35-yard reception by Devery Henderson, set up Carney's second field goal 15 seconds into the second quarter, making the score 6–0.

Three plays after the kickoff, Eagles quarterback Jeff Garcia threw a 75-yard touchdown pass to Donté Stallworth to give his team a 7–6 lead. The Saints responded with a 78-yard drive, scoring on a 5-yard touchdown run by Bush to retake the lead at 13–7. However, the Eagles stormed right back, driving 80 yards in 11 plays. On third down and goal, running back Brian Westbrook took a handoff and jumped over top of the defensive line and fell into the end zone for a touchdown, giving them a 14–13 lead with 50 seconds left in the half. New Orleans returner Michael Lewis returned the kickoff 25 yards to their 35-yard line. With two seconds left, quarterback Drew Brees threw a Hail Mary pass to the end zone. Wide receiver Marques Colston initially caught the ball, but it squirted out of his arms as he fell to the ground, and was ruled an incompletion.

Philadelphia took the second-half kickoff and scored in just three plays with a 62-yard touchdown romp from Westbrook, increasing their lead to 21–13. However, Lewis returned their kickoff 36 yards to the 37-yard line, where the Saints drove 63 yards in 8 plays, the longest a 29-yard completion from Brees to tight end Billy Miller. McAllister finished the possession with a 5-yard touchdown run, making the score 21–20. Then after forcing a punt, New Orleans drove to the Eagles' 29-yard line. After two penalties (a holding call against the Saints and an illegal contact call against the Eagles), McAllister rushed for 25 yards and followed it up with an 11-yard touchdown reception, giving the Saints a 27–21 lead.

With less than a minute left in the third quarter, Philadelphia safety Reno Mahe's 25-yard punt return sparked a 9-play, 66-yard drive featuring a 24-yard completion from Garcia to Reggie Brown. David Akers completed the drive with a 24-yard field goal, cutting their deficit to three points with 11:07 left on the clock. After an exchange of punts, the Saints drove from their 29 to the Eagles 35-yard line with 3:24 left in the game. New Orleans was in great position to take more time off the clock and increase their lead, but Bush fumbled a high pitch from Brees and Philadelphia's Darren Howard recovered the ball, giving his team a chance to drive for a tying field goal. However, the Eagles were unable to get a first down. They appeared to convert a fourth and 10 to Hank Baskett, but the loud crowd noise had muted the whistles of a false start by guard Scott Young, originally a backup to injured starter Shawn Andrews. After that, they chose to punt the ball back with 1:57 left. The Saints then clinched the victory by keeping possession of the ball for the rest of the game.

This was the second postseason meeting between the Eagles and Saints. Philadelphia won the only prior meeting 36–20 in the 1992 NFC Wild Card playoffs.

=== Sunday, January 14, 2007 ===
==== NFC: Chicago Bears 27, Seattle Seahawks 24 (OT) ====
Seattle Seahawks vs. Chicago Bears – Game summary

Quarter	1	2	3	4	OT	Total
Seahawks	0	14	10	0	0	24
Bears	7	14	0	3	3	27

at Soldier Field, Chicago, Illinois

- Game time: 1:00 p.m. EST/12:00 p.m. CST
- Game weather: 32 °F (0 °C), cloudy
- Game attendance: 62,184
- Referee: Gerald Austin
- TV announcers (Fox): Joe Buck (play-by-play), Troy Aikman (color commentator), Pam Oliver, and Chris Myers (sideline reporters)

Game information

1st Quarter

- CHI – Thomas Jones 9-yard run (Robbie Gould kick), 8:35. Bears 7–0. Drive: 12 plays, 80 yards, 6:25.

2nd Quarter

- SEA – Nate Burleson 16-yard pass from Matt Hasselbeck (Josh Brown kick), 14:54. Tied 7–7. Drive: 9 plays, 71 yards, 3:54.
- CHI – Bernard Berrian 68-yard pass from Rex Grossman (Robbie Gould kick), 14:36. Bears 14–7. Drive: 1 play, 68 yards, 0:18.
- SEA – Shaun Alexander 4-yard run (Josh Brown kick), 2:29. Tied 14–14. Drive: 5 plays, 26 yards, 1:50.
- CHI – Thomas Jones 7-yard run (Robbie Gould kick), 0:48. Bears 21–14. Drive: 7 plays, 57 yards, 1:41.

3rd Quarter

- SEA – Josh Brown 40-yard field goal, 9:56. Bears 21–17. Drive: 9 plays, 49 yards, 4:59.
- SEA – Shaun Alexander 13-yard run (Josh Brown kick), 4:57. Seahawks 24–21. Drive: 7 plays, 51 yards, 2:25.

4th Quarter

- CHI – Robbie Gould 41-yard field goal, 4:24. Tied 24–24. Drive: 12 plays, 48 yards, 5:51.

Overtime

- CHI – Robbie Gould 49-yard field goal, 10:02. Bears 27–24. Drive: 7 plays, 34 yards, 2:49.

Top passers

- SEA – Matt Hasselbeck – 18/33, 195 yards, TD, INT
- CHI – Rex Grossman – 21/38, 282 yards, TD, INT

Top rushers

- SEA – Shaun Alexander – 26 rushes, 108 yards, 2 TD
- CHI – Thomas Jones – 21 rushes, 66 yards, 2 TD

Top receivers

- SEA – Darrell Jackson – 4 receptions, 49 yards
- CHI – Bernard Berrian – 5 receptions, 105 yards, TD

Robbie Gould's 49-yard field goal in overtime propelled the Bears over the Seahawks and to their first NFC Championship Game since the 1988 season. This was also their first playoff win since 1994.

Chicago started the game with a 12-play, 70-yard possession, featuring a 37-yard completion from Rex Grossman to Rashied Davis. Running back Thomas Jones capped off the drive with a 9-yard touchdown run. Seahawks receiver Nate Burleson gave his team great field position with a 41-yard kickoff return to the 47-yard line, but the Bears forced Seattle to punt after three plays. Then, after forcing Chicago to punt, Seattle quarterback Matt Hasselbeck tied the score with a 16-yard touchdown pass to Burleson on the first play of the second quarter. However, Grossman threw a 68-yard touchdown pass to Bernard Berrian on the first play after the ensuing kickoff, giving his team a 14–7 lead.

Later in the quarter, Grossman lost a fumble while being sacked by Julian Peterson, and Seattle's Chuck Darby recovered the ball at the Bears' 26-yard line. Seahawks running back Shaun Alexander subsequently took the ball into the end zone with four running plays, the last one a 4-yard touchdown run to tie the game. Seattle decided to squib kick the ensuing kickoff to prevent a long return, but Bears tight end Gabe Reid gave Chicago good field position with a 20-yard return to the 43-yard line. After the two-minute warning, Grossman completed a 21-yard pass to Muhsin Muhammad and followed it up with an 18-yard completion to Rashied Davis, advancing the ball to the 7-yard line. Following a timeout, Jones scored his second rushing touchdown, giving the Bears a 21–14 halftime lead.

On the opening drive of the third quarter, Josh Brown's 54-yard field goal cut the Seahawks deficit to 21–17. Then, after the Bears were forced to punt, receiver Deion Branch caught two passes for 33 yards on a 7-play, 51-yard drive that ended with Alexander's second touchdown on a 13-yard run, making the score 24–21. Chicago responded by advancing the ball to the Seahawks 10-yard line, but cornerback Pete Hunter ended the drive by intercepting a pass intended for Muhammad. However, Ricky Manning intercepted Hasselbeck's next pass and returned it to the 32-yard line. Chicago ended up getting pushed back to the 36 and decided to punt rather than risk a 54-yard field goal attempt.

In the fourth quarter, Chicago lost a scoring opportunity when Devin Hester's 63-yard punt return touchdown was nullified by an illegal block penalty on Manning. Instead, they ended up driving 48 yards and scoring with Gould's 41-yard field goal to tie the game. Seattle responded with a drive to Chicago's 46-yard line, but turned the ball over on downs when Alexander was tackled for a 1-yard loss by Lance Briggs on fourth and 1 with under two minutes left in regulation. However, Chicago was unable to get a first down and had to punt. Seattle then drove to the Bears 45-yard line, but Tank Johnson sacked Hasselbeck for a 9-yard loss with less than 30 seconds left in regulation, and the game ended up going into overtime.

Seattle won the coin toss, but had to punt after three plays. On the punt, Chicago defender Israel Idonije broke through the offensive line and attempted to block the kick. He didn't quite make it there in time, but he forced Ryan Plackemeier to rush his punt, which ended up going just 18 yards to the Chicago 36-yard line. Two plays later, a 30-yard reception by Davis set up Gould's game-winning 49-yard field goal.

The game was later featured in an episode of NFL Greatest Games called "A Wild One In The Windy City!".

This was the first postseason meeting between the Seahawks and Bears.

==== AFC: New England Patriots 24, San Diego Chargers 21 ====
New England Patriots vs. San Diego Chargers – Game summary

Quarter	1	2	3	4	Total
Patriots	3	7	3	11	24
Chargers	0	14	0	7	21

at Qualcomm Stadium, San Diego, California

- Game time: 4:30 p.m. EST/1:30 p.m. PST
- Game weather: 53 °F (12 °C), clear
- Game attendance: 68,810
- Referee: Tony Corrente
- TV announcers (CBS): Jim Nantz (play-by-play) and Phil Simms (color commentator)

Game information

1st Quarter

- NE – Stephen Gostkowski 50-yard field goal, 0:40. Patriots 3–0. Drive: 9 plays, 33 yards, 4:35.

2nd Quarter

- SD – LaDainian Tomlinson 2-yard run (Nate Kaeding kick), 7:19. Chargers 7–3. Drive: 9 plays, 48 yards, 4:31.
- SD – Michael Turner 6-yard run (Nate Kaeding kick), 2:04. Chargers 14–3. Drive: 4 plays, 77 yards, 2:23.
- NE – Jabar Gaffney 6-yard pass from Tom Brady (Stephen Gostkowski kick), 0:08. Chargers 14–10. Drive: 11 plays, 72 yards, 1:56.

3rd Quarter

- NE – Stephen Gostkowski 34-yard field goal, 2:11. Chargers 14–13. Drive: 7 plays, 15 yards, 3:09.

4th Quarter

- SD – LaDainian Tomlinson 3-yard run (Nate Kaeding kick), 8:35. Chargers 21–13. Drive: 9 plays, 83 yards, 4:44.
- NE – Reche Caldwell 4-yard pass from Tom Brady (Kevin Faulk run), 4:36. Tied 21–21. Drive: 5 plays, 32 yards, 1:40.
- NE – Stephen Gostkowski 31-yard field goal, 1:10. Patriots 24–21. Drive: 8 plays, 72 yards, 2:16.

Top passers

- NE – Tom Brady – 27/51, 280 yards, 2 TD, 3 INT
- SD – Philip Rivers – 14/32, 230 yards, INT

Top rushers

- NE – Kevin Faulk – 6 rushes, 25 yards
- SD – LaDainian Tomlinson – 23 rushes, 123 yards, 2 TD

Top receivers

- NE – Jabar Gaffney – 10 receptions, 103 yards, TD
- SD – LaDainian Tomlinson – 2 receptions, 64 yards

In the final game of the divisional playoffs, the New England Patriots faced the San Diego Chargers, who were unbeaten at home in the regular season. The Chargers' roster included league MVP running back LaDainian Tomlinson, who broke several league records, nine Pro Bowlers, and five All-Pro players. However, four Chargers turnovers, three of which were converted into Patriots scoring drives, helped lead to a Chargers loss. San Diego lost despite outgaining the Patriots in rushing yards, 148–51 and total yards, 352–327, while also intercepting three passes from Tom Brady.

In the first quarter, after San Diego coach Marty Schottenheimer opted to go for it on fourth and 11 instead of attempting a 47-yard field goal, quarterback Philip Rivers lost a fumble while being sacked by Mike Vrabel, setting up Stephen Gostkowski's 51-yard field goal with 40 seconds left in the quarter. In the second quarter, Chargers receiver Eric Parker's 13-yard punt return set up a 48-yard scoring drive that ended with Tomlinson's 2-yard touchdown run, giving his team a 7–3 lead. Then, on the Patriots' next drive, linebacker Donnie Edwards intercepted a pass from Brady and returned it to the 41-yard line. But the Chargers ended up punting after Rivers was sacked on third down by Artrell Hawkins. Later in the quarter, Tomlinson rushed twice for 13 yards and took a screen pass 58 yards to the Patriots' 6-yard line, setting up a 6-yard touchdown run by Michael Turner with 2:04 left in the half. New England responded with a 72-yard scoring drive, with receiver Jabar Gaffney catching four passes for 46 yards, including a 7-yard touchdown reception with six seconds left in the half, cutting their deficit to 14–10.

In the second half, Brady threw his second interception of the game. But once again, the Chargers were forced to punt after Rivers was sacked on third down. Mike Scifres' 36-yard punt pinned New England back at their own 2-yard line, and San Diego subsequently forced a punt, but Parker muffed the kick and New England's David Thomas recovered the fumble at the Chargers' 31-yard line. New England's drive seemed to stall after Brady fumbled on third and 13. Patriots' offensive tackle Matt Light recovered it and Chargers safety Drayton Florence drew a 15-yard unsportsmanlike conduct penalty for taunting Patriots tight end Daniel Graham. The drive continued and Gostkowski eventually kicked a 34-yard field goal to cut their deficit to 14–13. Then, on San Diego's next drive, linebacker Rosevelt Colvin intercepted a pass from Rivers at the New England 36-yard line. The Patriots then drove to the Chargers 41-yard line, but were halted there and had to punt. After the punt, Rivers completed two passes to tight end Antonio Gates for 31 yards and a 31-yard pass to Vincent Jackson, setting up Tomlinson's second rushing touchdown to give the Chargers an 8-point lead, 21–13.

New England responded by driving to San Diego's 41-yard line. On a fourth-down conversion attempt, Brady's pass was intercepted by Marlon McCree, but Troy Brown stripped the ball, and receiver Reche Caldwell recovered it. Schottenheimer unsuccessfully challenged the play and lost a timeout. Four plays later, Brady threw a 4-yard touchdown pass to Caldwell. On the next play, running back Kevin Faulk took a direct snap and scored the two-point conversion, tying the game. Then, after forcing a punt, Brady completed a 19-yard pass to Graham. Two plays later, Caldwell caught a 49-yard strike down the right sideline to set up Gostkowski's third field goal to give them a 24–21 lead with only 1:10 left in the fourth quarter. With no timeouts left, San Diego drove to the Patriots 36-yard line on their final possession, but Nate Kaeding's 53-yard field goal attempt fell short with three seconds remaining in the game.

One month later, Schottenheimer was fired by San Diego, ending his 21-year coaching career. His 14–2 season with the Chargers was his best regular season record ever, and he is the only coach in NFL history to be fired after racking up 14 wins.

This was the Patriots last road playoff victory until the 2018 AFC Championship Game in Kansas City.

This was the second postseason meeting between the Patriots and Chargers, with San Diego winning the prior meeting 51–10 in the 1963 AFL Championship Game.

== Conference championships ==
=== Sunday, January 21, 2007 ===
==== NFC: Chicago Bears 39, New Orleans Saints 14 ====
New Orleans Saints vs. Chicago Bears – Game summary

Quarter	1	2	3	4	Total
Saints	0	7	7	0	14
Bears	3	13	2	21	39

at Soldier Field, Chicago, Illinois

- Game time: 3:00 p.m. EST/2:00 p.m. CST
- Game weather: 28 °F (−2 °C), cloudy
- Game attendance: 61,817
- Referee: Terry McAulay
- TV announcers (Fox): Joe Buck (play-by-play), Troy Aikman (color commentator), Pam Oliver, and Chris Myers (sideline reporters)

Game information

1st Quarter

- CHI – Robbie Gould 19-yard field goal, 0:41. Bears 3–0. Drive: 11 plays, 35 yards, 4:44.

2nd Quarter

- CHI – Robbie Gould 43-yard field goal, 13:40. Bears 6–0. Drive: 4 plays, 5 yards, 1:53.
- CHI – Robbie Gould 24-yard field goal, 8:52. Bears 9–0. Drive: 8 plays, 43 yards, 3:25.
- CHI – Thomas Jones 2-yard run (Robbie Gould kick), 1:56. Bears 16–0. Drive: 8 plays, 69 yards, 3:55.
- NO – Marques Colston 13-yard pass from Drew Brees (John Carney kick), 0:46. Bears 16–7. Drive: 8 plays, 73 yards, 1:10.

3rd Quarter

- NO – Reggie Bush 88-yard pass from Drew Brees (John Carney kick), 12:20. Bears 16–14. Drive: 2 plays, 93 yards, 0:53.
- CHI – Intentional grounding penalty on Drew Brees enforced in end zone for safety, 5:27. Bears 18–14.

4th Quarter

- CHI – Bernard Berrian 33-yard pass from Rex Grossman (Robbie Gould kick), 14:23. Bears 25–14. Drive: 5 plays, 85 yards, 2:24.
- CHI – Cedric Benson 12-yard run (Robbie Gould kick), 11:37. Bears 32–14. Drive: 4 plays, 26 yards, 2:04.
- CHI – Thomas Jones 15-yard run (Robbie Gould kick), 4:19. Bears 39–14. Drive: 5 plays, 30 yards, 3:02.

Top passers

- NO – Drew Brees – 27/49, 354 yards, 2 TD, INT
- CHI – Rex Grossman – 11/26, 144 yards, TD

Top rushers

- NO – Reggie Bush – 4 rushes, 19 yards
- CHI – Thomas Jones – 19 rushes, 123 yards, 2 TD

Top receivers

- NO – Reggie Bush – 7 receptions, 132 yards, TD
- CHI – Bernard Berrian – 5 receptions, 85 yards, TD

Although the Saints outgained the Bears in total yards, 375–335, their four turnovers (three fumbles and one interception) contributed to a Bears victory.

On the opening drive of the game, Saints receiver Devery Henderson caught a 40-yard pass at the Bears' 32-yard line. But three plays later, Bears defensive end Israel Idonije sacked quarterback Drew Brees on the 36-yard line, and the Saints decided to punt rather than attempt a 54-yard field goal.

With 5:28 remaining in the first quarter, Bears cornerback Nathan Vasher recovered a fumble from Marques Colston and returned it 14 yards to the Saints' 36-yard line. Several plays later, Robbie Gould kicked a 19-yard field goal to give the Bears a 3–0 lead. Then, Chicago's Danieal Manning recovered a fumble from Michael Lewis on the ensuing kickoff, setting up Gould's second field goal to increase the lead to 6–0. New Orleans was forced to punt on their next possession, and Devin Hester gave his team good field position with a 10-yard return to the Saints' 49-yard line. Two plays later, tight end Desmond Clark's 30-yard reception moved the ball to the 19. Once again, New Orleans kept Chicago's offense out of the end zone, but Gould kicked his third field goal to give the Bears a 9–0 lead. Then, after forcing another punt, Chicago stormed down the field on a drive in which running back Thomas Jones carried the ball on eight consecutive plays, gaining 69 yards and finishing it off with a 2-yard touchdown run. This time, New Orleans managed to respond, with Brees completing five passes for 73 yards on their ensuing possession, the last one a 13-yard touchdown pass to Colston, to cut their deficit to 16–7 by halftime.

Two plays after forcing a punt from Chicago on the opening drive of the second half, running back Reggie Bush caught a pass from Brees and took it 88 yards for a touchdown to cut the deficit to two points. Then after forcing another punt, New Orleans drove to the Bears' 29-yard line. But this time, they failed to score, as Brees threw three incompletions and Billy Cundiff missed a 47-yard field goal attempt.

After the ensuing kickoff, Brad Maynard's 51-yard punt gave the Saints the ball at their own 5-yard line. Two plays later, Brees committed an intentional grounding penalty in the end zone, resulting in a safety. Two possessions later, Chicago stormed 85 yards in five plays, with quarterback Rex Grossman completing four consecutive passes for 73 yards, the last one a 33-yard touchdown pass to Bernard Berrian, increasing their lead to 25–14.

The next time the Bears had the ball, they scored another touchdown with a 12-yard run by Cedric Benson on a drive that was set up after Brees lost a fumble while being sacked by Adewale Ogunleye. Then, on New Orleans' next drive, Brees was intercepted by Vasher. After the ensuing possession, Maynard's 46-yard punt pinned the Saints at their own 8-yard line, and the Saints could only reach their own 30 before turning the ball over on downs. Five plays later, Jones closed out the scoring with a 15-yard touchdown run, making the final score 39–14.

In addition, Bush became the fifth Heisman Trophy winner to play in a conference championship game the year after winning the trophy. Mike Garrett, who also went to the University of Southern California, did so with the Chiefs in 1966 (playing in the AFL Championship Game to advance to Super Bowl I), Tony Dorsett did with the Cowboys in 1977, Earl Campbell did with the Houston Oilers in 1978 and Ron Dayne did with the Giants in 2000. Campbell and Bush are the only two of those to not advance to the Super Bowl in that season

This was the second postseason meeting between the Saints and Bears. Chicago won the previous meeting 16–6 in the 1990 NFC Wild Card playoffs.

==== AFC: Indianapolis Colts 38, New England Patriots 34 ====
New England Patriots vs. Indianapolis Colts – Game summary

Quarter	1	2	3	4	Total
Patriots	7	14	7	6	34
Colts	3	3	15	17	38

at RCA Dome, Indianapolis, Indiana

- Game time: 6:30 p.m. EST
- Game weather: Played indoors, domed stadium
- Game attendance: 57,433
- Referee: Bill Carollo
- TV announcers (CBS): Jim Nantz (play-by-play), Phil Simms (color commentator), Steve Tasker, and Solomon Wilcots (sideline reporters)

Game information

1st Quarter

- NE – Logan Mankins fumble recovery in end zone for touchdown (Stephen Gostkowski kick), 7:24. Patriots 7–0. Drive: 8 plays, 75 yards, 3:36.
- IND – Adam Vinatieri 42-yard field goal, 0:48. Patriots 7–3. Drive: 14 plays, 56 yards, 6:30.

2nd Quarter

- NE – Corey Dillon 7-yard run (Stephen Gostkowski kick), 10:18. Patriots 14–3. Drive: 11 plays, 72 yards, 5:30.
- NE – Asante Samuel 39-yard interception return (Stephen Gostkowski kick), 9:25. Patriots 21–3.
- IND – Adam Vinatieri 26-yard field goal, 0:07. Patriots 21–6. Drive: 15 plays, 80 yards, 2:59.

3rd Quarter

- IND – Peyton Manning 1-yard run (Adam Vinatieri kick), 8:13. Patriots 21–13. Drive: 14 plays, 76 yards, 6:47.
- IND – Dan Klecko 1-yard pass from Manning (Marvin Harrison pass from Peyton Manning), 4:00. Tied 21–21. Drive: 6 plays, 76 yards, 2:50.
- NE – Jabar Gaffney 6-yard pass from Tom Brady (Stephen Gostkowski kick), 1:25. Patriots 28–21. Drive: 5 plays, 21 yards, 1:25.

4th Quarter

- IND – Jeff Saturday fumble recovery in end zone for touchdown (Adam Vinatieri kick), 13:24. Tied 28–28. Drive: 7 plays, 67 yards, 3:01.
- NE – Stephen Gostkowski 28-yard field goal, 7:45. Patriots 31–28. Drive: 6 plays, 33 yards, 2:44.
- IND – Adam Vinatieri 36-yard field goal, 5:35. Tied 31–31. Drive: 5 plays, 59 yards, 2:11.
- NE – Stephen Gostkowski 43-yard field goal, 3:53. Patriots 34–31. Drive: 5 plays, 29 yards, 1:42.
- IND – Joseph Addai 3-yard run (Adam Vinatieri kick), 1:00. Colts 38–34. Drive: 7 plays, 80 yards, 1:17.

Top passers

- NE – Tom Brady – 21/34, 232 yards, TD, INT
- IND – Peyton Manning – 27/47, 349 yards, TD, INT

Top rushers

- NE – Corey Dillon – 7 rushes, 48 yards, TD
- IND – Dominic Rhodes – 14 rushes, 69 yards

Top receivers

- NE – Benjamin Watson – 5 receptions, 48 yards
- IND – Dallas Clark – 6 receptions, 137 yards

The Colts gained 455 offensive yards, 32 first downs, and managed to overcome a 21–3 deficit to the Patriots to earn their first trip to the Super Bowl since the 1970 NFL season. Their 18-point comeback was the largest ever in an NFL conference championship game (since tied by the Cincinnati Bengals in the 2021 AFC Championship game), and tied the record for the fourth largest NFL postseason comeback. The Colts' win came after the Patriots had eliminated the Colts from the playoffs twice in the previous three seasons.

Midway through the first quarter, the Patriots drove 71 yards to the Colts' 4-yard line, featuring a 35-yard run by Corey Dillon. On third down, running back Laurence Maroney fumbled a handoff, but the ball rolled into the end zone where Patriots guard Logan Mankins recovered it for a touchdown. The Colts responded by driving 56 yards and scoring with Adam Vinatieri's 42-yard field goal to cut their deficit to 7–3. On their ensuing drive, the Patriots drove to a fourth down on the Colts' 34-yard line. Rather than attempt a 52-yard field goal, New England decided to go for it and Tom Brady completed a 27-yard pass to Troy Brown. On the next play, Dillon scored on a 7-yard touchdown run. Then, two plays after the ensuing kickoff, cornerback Asante Samuel intercepted a pass from Peyton Manning and returned it 39 yards for a touchdown, giving New England a 21–3 lead. Later in the quarter, Indianapolis drove 80 yards in 15 plays, with Vinatieri finishing the drive with a 26-yard field goal, cutting the score to 21–6 with 11 seconds left in the half.

On the opening drive of the second half, the Colts drove 79 yards in 15 plays and scored with a 1-yard run by Manning. Then, after forcing a punt, a 25-yard reception by Dallas Clark and a 19-yard run by Dominic Rhodes moved the ball to the Patriots' 32-yard line. Following a pass interference penalty on Ellis Hobbs in the end zone, Manning threw a 1-yard touchdown pass to defensive tackle Dan Klecko, who had lined up at the fullback position on the play. Then, receiver Marvin Harrison caught a 2-point conversion pass to tie the game at 21.

Hobbs returned the ensuing kickoff 80 yards to the Colts' 21-yard line. Four plays later, Brady threw a 6-yard touchdown pass to receiver Jabar Gaffney, who made a leaping catch in the back of the end zone. Although he landed out of bounds, officials ruled that he was pushed out while in the air, and the Patriots took a 28–21 lead. Rhodes started out the Colts' next drive with two receptions for 23 yards and a 9-yard run. Then, Clark caught a 23-yard pass at the 9-yard line. Three plays later, Rhodes fumbled the ball at the 1-yard line, but Colts center Jeff Saturday recovered it in the end zone for a touchdown to tie the game. Mankins and Saturday's touchdowns marked the first time in NFL playoff history in which more than one offensive lineman scored a touchdown in the same game.

After an exchange of punts, New England kicker Stephen Gostkowski made a 28-yard field goal to give them a three-point lead. The Colts responded with a 36-yard field goal by Vinatieri, set up by Clark's 52-yard reception, to tie the game at 31. Hobbs returned Vinatieri's kickoff 41 yards to the Patriots' 46-yard line. Then, Brady completed a 25-yard pass to tight end Daniel Graham. Indianapolis managed to halt the drive at their 25-yard line, but Gostkowski kicked a 43-yard field goal to give the Patriots a 34–31 lead with 3:49 left in the game. New England's defense subsequently forced a punt, but the Patriots ended up punting back to the Colts after running only a minute off the clock.

Manning started off the drive with three nonconsecutive completions for 58 yards, with a roughing-the-passer penalty on the third play adding another 12, moving the ball 70 yards in a span of 19 seconds and bringing up a first down at the Patriots' 11-yard line. Three plays later, Joseph Addai's 3-yard touchdown run gave the Colts their first lead of the game with only one minute remaining. Brady responded by leading his team to the Colts' 45-yard line. But cornerback Marlin Jackson intercepted Brady's next pass with 17 seconds left, ending the game, and sending the Colts to their third Super Bowl in team history (first as the Indianapolis Colts).

The Colts were the first #3 seed since the NFL expanded the playoffs in 1990 to host a conference championship game and the first overall since the Washington Redskins did so in 1987. It was also the first time since said season where a team hosted a championship game after playing a road game in the divisional round, and was also the first conference championship game in which neither team had the first round bye and had to play three rounds to get to the Super Bowl.

Hobbs set a Patriots franchise record with 220 kickoff return yards, the second highest total in NFL postseason history.

The game was featured as one of the NFL's Greatest Games as Peyton's Revenge. For the Patriots, it was their last road playoff loss until the 2013 AFC Championship Game at Denver (whom Manning had joined after leaving Indianapolis).

This was the third postseason meeting between the Patriots and Colts. New England won the previous two meetings in consecutive years, with New England's most recent victory by a score of 20–3 in the 2004 AFC Divisional playoffs.

== Super Bowl XLI: Indianapolis Colts 29, Chicago Bears 17 ==
Super Bowl XLI – Indianapolis Colts vs. Chicago Bears – Game summary

Quarter	1	2	3	4	Total
Colts (AFC)	6	10	6	7	29
Bears (NFC)	14	0	3	0	17

at Dolphin Stadium, Miami Gardens, Florida

- Date: February 4, 2007
- Game time: 6:25 p.m. EST
- Game weather: 67 °F (19 °C), rainy
- Game attendance: 74,512
- Referee: Tony Corrente
- TV announcers (CBS): Jim Nantz (play-by-play), Phil Simms (color commentator), Steve Tasker, and Solomon Wilcots (sideline reporters)
- Recap

Game information

First quarter

- CHI – Devin Hester 92-yard kickoff return (Robbie Gould kick), 14:46. Bears 7–0. Drive: 0 plays, 0 yards, 0:14.
- IND – Reggie Wayne 53-yard pass from Peyton Manning (Adam Vinatieri kick failed), 6:50. Bears 7–6. Drive: 9 plays, 80 yards, 4:30.
- CHI – Muhsin Muhammad 4-yard pass from Rex Grossman (Robbie Gould kick), 4:34. Bears 14–6. Drive: 4 plays, 57 yards, 2:00.

Second quarter

- IND – Adam Vinatieri 29-yard field goal, 11:17. Bears 14–9. Drive: 8 plays, 47 yards, 3:52.
- IND – Dominic Rhodes 1-yard run (Adam Vinatieri kick), 6:09. Colts 16–14. Drive: 7 plays, 58 yards, 3:08.

Third quarter

- IND – Adam Vinatieri 24-yard field goal, 7:26. Colts 19–14. Drive: 13 plays, 56 yards, 7:34.
- IND – Adam Vinatieri 20-yard field goal, 3:16. Colts 22–14. Drive: 6 plays, 62 yards, 2:07.
- CHI – Robbie Gould 44-yard field goal, 1:14. Colts 22–17. Drive: 6 plays, 14 yards, 2:02.

Fourth quarter

- IND – Kelvin Hayden 56-yard interception return (Adam Vinatieri kick), 11:44. Colts 29–17.

Top passers

- IND – Peyton Manning – 25/38, 247 yards, TD, INT
- CHI – Rex Grossman – 20/28, 165 yards, TD, 2 INT

Top rushers

- IND – Dominic Rhodes – 21 rushes, 113 yards, TD
- CHI – Thomas Jones – 15 rushes, 112 yards

Top receivers

- IND – Joseph Addai – 10 receptions, 66 yards
- CHI – Desmond Clark – 6 receptions, 64 yards

This was the first Super Bowl meeting between the Colts and Bears.

== Sources ==
- "Colts turn up the 'D' in 23–8 wild-card win". NFL.com wire reports. January 6, 2007.
- "NFL Gamebook – KC @ IND" (PDF). NFL.com. January 6, 2007.
- "Fumbles help Seahawks fend off Cowboys". NFL.com wire reports. January 6, 2007.
- "NFL Gamebook – DAL @ SEA" (PDF). NFL.com. January 6, 2007.
- "Pats dominate fourth quarter, top Jets 37–16". NFL.com wire reports. January 7, 2007.
- "NFL Gamebook – NYJ @ NE" (PDF). NFL.com. January 7, 2007.
- "Akers boots Eagles to victory over Giants". NFL.com wire reports. January 7, 2007.
- "NFL Gamebook – NYG @ PHI" (PDF). NFL.com. January 7, 2007.
- "Vinatieri boots Colts into AFC title game". NFL.com wire reports. January 13, 2007.
- "NFL Gamebook – IND @ BAL" (PDF). NFL.com. January 13, 2007.
- "Spirited Saints rally past Eagles 27–24". NFL.com wire reports. January 13, 2007.
- "NFL Gamebook – PHI @ NO" (PDF). NFL.com. January 13, 2007.
- "Gould's OT heroics lifts Chicago past Seattle". NFL.com wire reports. January 14, 2007.
- "NFL Gamebook – SEA @ CHI" (PDF). NFL.com. January 14, 2007.
- "Brady leads Pats' rally, knocks out Bolts". NFL.com wire reports. January 14, 2007.
- "NFL Gamebook – NE @ SD" (PDF). NFL.com. January 14, 2007.
- "'D' Bears head to Super Bowl XLI, win 39–14". NFL.com wire reports. January 21, 2007.
- "NFL Gamebook – NO @ CHI" (PDF). NFL.com. January 21, 2007.
- "Manning, Colts break through to Super Bowl". NFL.com wire reports. January 21, 2007.
- "NFL Gamebook – NE @ IND" (PDF). NFL.com. January 21, 2007.
