= Marlon McCree =

American football player and coach (born 1977)

No. 32, 29, 27, 20
- Position: Safety

Personal information
- Born: March 17, 1977 (age 49); Orlando, Florida, U.S.
- Listed height: 5 ft 11 in (1.80 m)
- Listed weight: 202 lb (92 kg)

Career information
- High school: Atlantic (Port Orange, Florida)
- College: Kentucky (1997–2000)
- NFL draft: 2001: 7th round, 233rd overall pick

Career history

Playing
- Jacksonville Jaguars (2001−2003); Houston Texans (2003−2004); Carolina Panthers (2005); San Diego Chargers (2006−2007); Denver Broncos (2008); Jacksonville Jaguars (2009)*
- * Offseason or practice squad member only

Coaching
- Jacksonville Jaguars (2012) Assistant defensive backs coach

Career NFL statistics
- Total tackles: 451
- Sacks: 3
- Forced fumbles: 3
- Fumble recoveries: 5
- Interceptions: 16
- Defensive touchdowns: 2
- Stats at Pro Football Reference

Marlon Tarron McCree (born March 17, 1977) is an American former professional football player who was a safety in the National Football League (NFL). He played college football for the Kentucky Wildcats and was selected by the Jacksonville Jaguars in the seventh round of the 2001 NFL draft.

McCree also played for the Houston Texans, Carolina Panthers, San Diego Chargers, and Denver Broncos. He served as an assistant defensive backs coach for the Jaguars in 2012.

== Early life ==
Marl Tarron McCree grew up in inner-city Orlando during the 1980s and 1990s. His brother, Cameron, died of leukemia at this time. McCree attended Atlantic High School in Port Orange, Florida, where he was a letterman in football, basketball, and track. A first-team, all-state member in his senior season, McCree was Atlantic's first Division I-A signee. He was first-team all-state in Class AAAA as chosen by the Florida Sportswriters Association. He was the winner of the 1995 Volusia County Helmet Award for the top defensive back in the county and the team's Most Valuable Player. McCree was also County Player of the Week seven times during his senior season as chosen by the Volusia County Quarterback Club. He served as a two-year starter as strong safety and linebacker and was chosen all-county both years. His senior campaign featured 110 tackles, eight sacks, 11 caused fumbles, six fumbles recovered, four blocked kicks, a punt return for a 69-yard touchdown and a kickoff return for an 80-yard touchdown. McCree received five scholarship offers coming out of Atlantic High School: Boston College, Kansas State, University of Kentucky, Indiana State and UCF, ultimately choosing Kentucky. He was coached by Kevin Sullivan. He was also a two-year letterman in basketball and track.

== College career ==
McCree was a four-year letterman (1997–2000) at the University of Kentucky. A three-year starter, he arrived at Kentucky as a strong safety, but moved to linebacker midway through his redshirt freshman season. McCree's career totals included 219 tackles (46 for loss), 14.5 quarterback sacks, two interceptions, three caused fumbles and six fumble recoveries. He also led the Wildcats to two bowl appearances (1998 Outback Bowl, 1999 Music City Bowl). McCree graduated with a degree in finance.

== Professional career ==
=== 2001 NFL draft ===
McCree was selected in the 7th round 233rd overall of the 2001 NFL draft by the Jacksonville Jaguars.

Pre-draft measurables
Height	Weight	40-yard dash	10-yard split	20-yard split	20-yard shuttle	Three-cone drill	Vertical jump	Broad jump	Bench press	Wonderlic
5 ft 10 1/2 in (1.79 m)	197 lb (89 kg)	4.62 s	1.62 s	2.69 s	4.14 s	7.36 s	38 in (0.97 m)	9 ft 9 in (2.97 m)	10 reps	16
All values from NFL Combine.

=== Jacksonville Jaguars (first stint) ===
McCree received significant playing time during his first two seasons, playing in all but three games, and making six interceptions in 2002.

=== Houston Texans ===
McCree was waived by the Jaguars in 2003 and was picked up by the Houston Texans. On December 21, 2003, he scored his first career touchdown, a 95-yard interception return off of the Tennessee Titans' Steve McNair.

=== Carolina Panthers ===
McCree was claimed off waivers by the Carolina Panthers prior to the 2005 NFL season, where he served as the starting free safety. McCree recorded three interceptions in the regular season, but truly made his mark in the first playoff game of his career.

On January 8, 2006, McCree played smothering defense in Carolina's first-round game against the New York Giants. His second interception of the game of New York's Eli Manning preserved a 20–0 lead, and effectively put the Panthers ahead for good. Carolina won, 23–0.

=== San Diego Chargers ===
On March 11, 2006, the San Diego Chargers signed McCree to a five-year deal through 2010.

McCree's tenure with the Chargers was defined by losing a fumble. During a playoff game against the New England Patriots on January 14, 2007, McCree had a critical fourth quarter interception with the Chargers leading, 21–13. However, while tackling McCree following the interception, Patriots wide receiver Troy Brown stripped the ball away from him that Reche Caldwell would recover for the Patriots. San Diego's defense was unable to stop New England on the drive that followed, and the Patriots scored a touchdown and a two-point conversion to tie the game at 21. The Patriots eventually won, 24–21.

In the following season, on January 13, 2008, late in the fourth quarter of a playoff game against the Indianapolis Colts, Peyton Manning was driving Indy toward what appeared to be a go-ahead score. But on third down and five, McCree knocked Indianapolis wide receiver Reggie Wayne out of the game and forcing the Colts to use their final timeout. Jim McCabe of the Boston Globe described this as "textbook precision with a playoff game hinging on his split-second thinking".

McCree and the Chargers advanced to the AFC Championship game, where they would lose a rematch with the Patriots.

On February 28, 2008, the Chargers released McCree to allow more playing time for the younger safety, Eric Weddle.

=== Denver Broncos ===
On March 8, 2008, McCree was signed by the Denver Broncos.

=== Jacksonville Jaguars (second stint) ===
McCree re-signed with the Jacksonville Jaguars on June 3, 2009. He was released on September 5, 2009.

== NFL career statistics ==
Legend
	Led the league
**Bold**	Career high

=== Regular season ===
Year	Team	Games		Tackles					Interceptions					Fumbles			
Year	Team	GP	GS	Cmb	Solo	Ast	Sck	TFL	Int	Yds	TD	Lng	PD	FF	FR	Yds	TD
2001	JAX	13	11	48	35	13	**1.0**	2	1	10	0	10	3	**2**	**2**	2	0
2002	JAX	**16**	**16**	71	56	15	**1.0**	**3**	**6**	**129**	0	53	**11**	0	0	0	0
2003	JAX	2	0	5	4	1	0.0	1	0	0	0	0	0	0	0	0	0
2003	HOU	13	11	52	35	**17**	0.0	0	1	95	**1**	**95**	4	0	0	0	0
2004	HOU	**16**	1	32	30	2	0.0	0	1	24	0	24	3	0	0	0	0
2005	CAR	**16**	15	**88**	**74**	14	0.0	2	3	73	0	46	10	0	1	4	0
2006	SDG	14	14	59	42	**17**	**1.0**	**3**	1	0	0	0	5	0	1	**79**	**1**
2007	SDG	**16**	**16**	67	50	**17**	0.0	0	3	20	0	19	6	1	1	2	0
2008	DEN	8	7	29	23	6	0.0	1	0	0	0	0	2	0	0	0	0
		114	91	451	349	102	3.0	12	16	351	1	95	44	3	5	87	1

=== Playoffs ===
Year	Team	Games		Tackles					Interceptions					Fumbles			
Year	Team	GP	GS	Cmb	Solo	Ast	Sck	TFL	Int	Yds	TD	Lng	PD	FF	FR	Yds	TD
2005	CAR	**3**	**3**	**14**	**11**	**3**	0.0	**1**	**2**	-9	0	**1**	**3**	0	0	0	0
2006	SDG	1	1	4	2	2	0.0	**1**	1	**1**	0	**1**	1	0	0	0	0
2007	SDG	**3**	**3**	12	9	**3**	0.0	**1**	0	0	0	0	1	0	**1**	0	0
		7	7	30	22	8	0.0	3	3	-8	0	1	5	0	1	0	0

== Post-playing career ==
On January 17, 2012, McCree reached a deal with the Jacksonville Jaguars to return to the team as an assistant coach.

McCree was a 2015 Florida Athletic Coaches Association Hall of Fame inductee.
