= Jabar Gaffney =

American football player (born 1980)

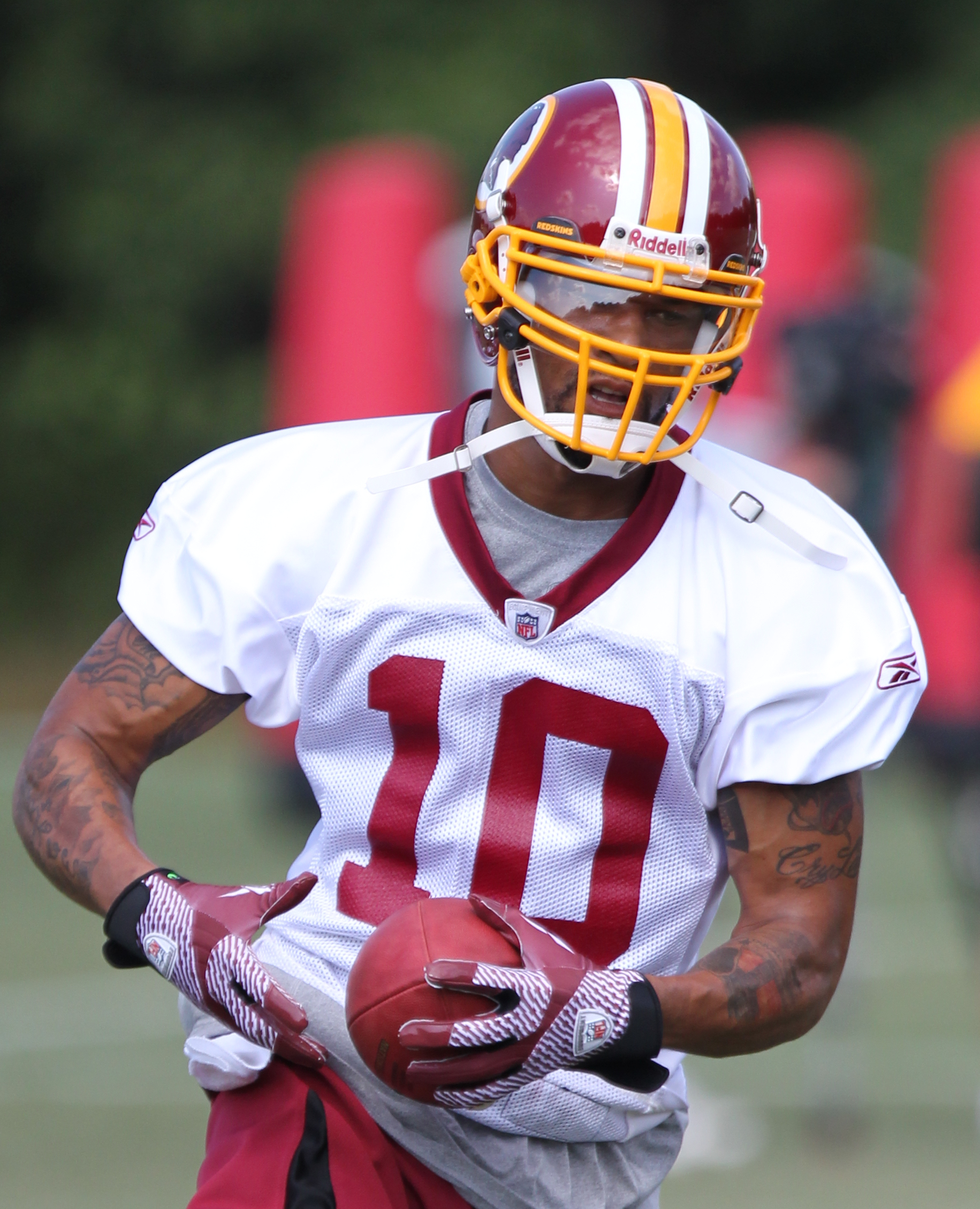
- Gaffney with the Washington Redskins in 2011

No. 86, 10
- Position: Wide receiver

Personal information
- Born: December 1, 1980 (age 45); San Antonio, Texas, U.S.
- Listed height: 6 ft 2 in (1.88 m)
- Listed weight: 200 lb (91 kg)

Career information
- High school: William M. Raines (Jacksonville, Florida)
- College: Florida (1999–2001)
- NFL draft: 2002: 2nd round, 33rd overall pick

Career history
- Houston Texans (2002–2005); Philadelphia Eagles (2006)*; New England Patriots (2006–2008); Denver Broncos (2009–2010); Washington Redskins (2011); New England Patriots (2012)*; Miami Dolphins (2012)
- * Offseason or practice squad member only

Awards and highlights
- Paul Warfield Award (2001); Unanimous All-American (2001); Third-team All-American (2000); 2× First-team All-SEC (2000, 2001); SEC Freshman of the Year (2000)

Career NFL statistics
- Receptions: 447
- Receiving yards: 5,690
- Receiving touchdowns: 24
- Stats at Pro Football Reference

Derrick Jabar Gaffney (born December 1, 1980) is an American former professional football player who was a wide receiver in the National Football League (NFL). He played college football for the Florida Gators, earning unanimous All-American honors in 2001. He was selected by the Houston Texans in the second round of the 2002 NFL draft, and also played in the NFL for the New England Patriots, Denver Broncos, Washington Redskins, and Miami Dolphins.

== Early life ==
Gaffney was born in San Antonio, Texas. He attended William M. Raines High School in Jacksonville, Florida, and was a letterman for the Raines Vikings high school football team. In football, he was a two-year starter as a wide receiver, and as a junior in 1997, he caught the game-winning, fourth-quarter touchdown pass in the state championship game.

== College career ==
Gaffney accepted an athletic scholarship to attend the University of Florida in Gainesville, Florida, where he played for coach Steve Spurrier's Florida Gators football team in 2000 and 2001. The Gators coaching staff decided to redshirt him as a true freshman in 1999. Gaffney became a prolific pass-catcher as a first-year starter for the Gators in 2000, and made the game-winning touchdown catch with fourteen seconds remaining to defeat the Tennessee Volunteers 27–23—a game that ultimately decided the 2000 winner of the Eastern Division of the Southeastern Conference (SEC). Gaffney amassed 1,184 receiving yards and fourteen touchdown receptions in 2000, and another 1,191 and thirteen touchdowns in 2001.

He was a first-team All-SEC selection in 2000 and 2001; he was a College Football News first-team All-American after his redshirt freshman season in 2000, and was recognized as a unanimous first-team All-American by the Associated Press, American Football Coaches Association, Football Writers Association of America, Sporting News, and Walter Camp Foundation following his 2001 sophomore season. In 2001, he was one of the three finalists for the Biletnikoff Award, recognizing the outstanding receiver in college football. He finished his two-season college career with 138 receptions for 2,375 yards and twenty-seven touchdowns, and was chosen by his teammates as the Gators' most valuable player. He remains the only receiver in Gators history with two seasons of 1,000 yards or more.

== Professional career ==
Pre-draft measurables
Height	Weight	Arm length	Hand span	40-yard dash	20-yard shuttle	Three-cone drill
6 ft 1 1/8 in (1.86 m)	193 lb (88 kg)	32 1/2 in (0.83 m)	7 1/2 in (0.19 m)	4.56 s	4.06 s	6.87 s
All values from NFL Combine

=== Houston Texans ===
Gaffney was selected with the 1st pick in the 2nd round of the 2002 NFL draft by the Houston Texans. His tenure with the team was marred by his often inconsistent play which led to his benching in favor of veteran receivers, in particular Corey Bradford. After his rookie contract was up, the Texans chose not to re-sign him.

=== Philadelphia Eagles ===
On March 16, 2006, the Eagles signed Gaffney to a one-year contract. He was released before the start of the season.

=== New England Patriots (first stint) ===
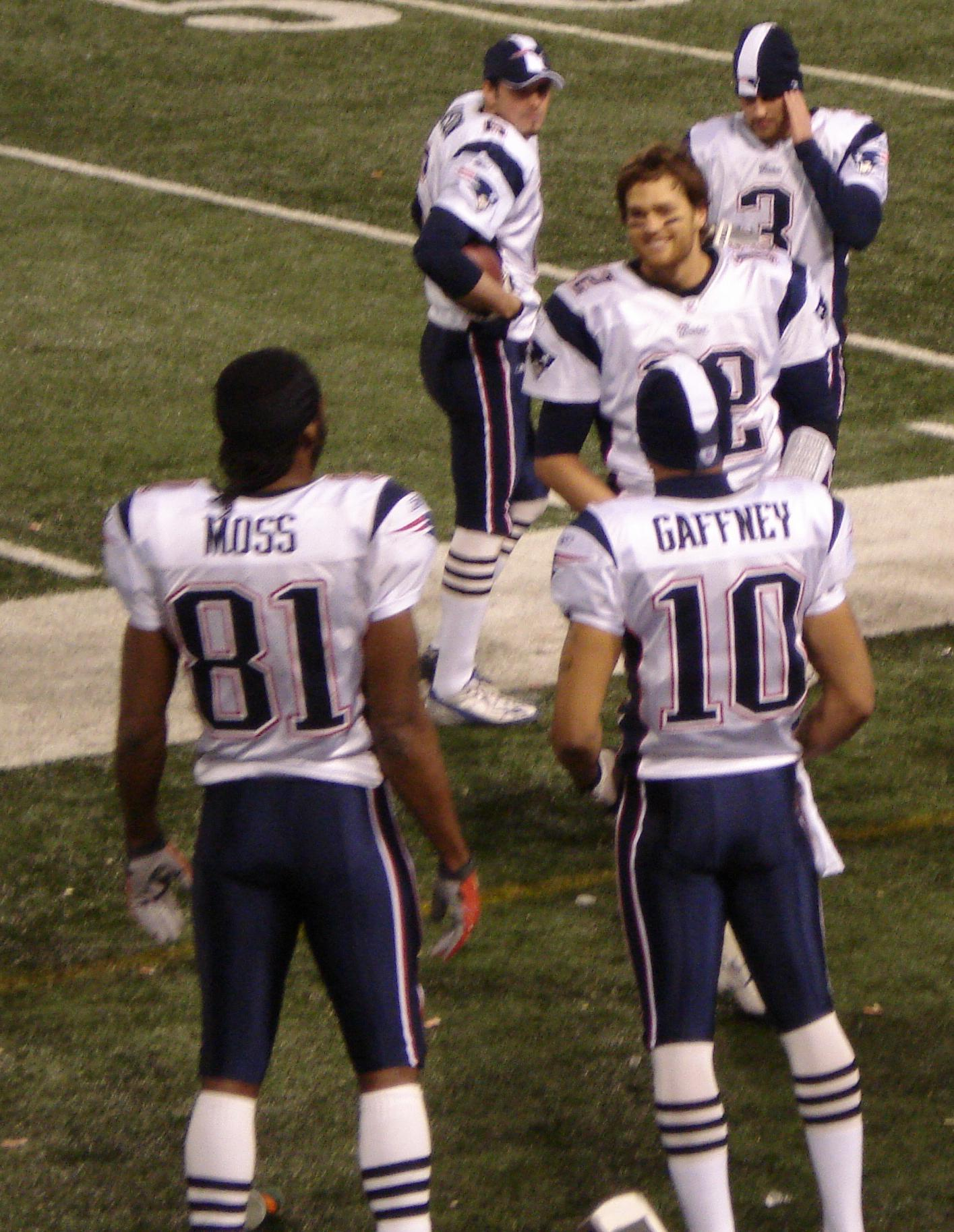
Gaffney, Randy Moss, and Tom Brady talk on the sidelines in 2007.

Gaffney signed a two-year deal with the New England Patriots on October 9, 2006. On March 5, 2008, Gaffney re-signed with the Patriots for one year worth $2 million.

In his first-ever playoff game, on January 7, 2007, against the New York Jets, Gaffney caught eight passes for 104 yards, his second 100-yard performance as a receiver (in ten regular season games, Gaffney caught 11 passes for 142 yards and one touchdown.) Gaffney followed that performance a week later against San Diego with another 100-yard game, in which he caught ten passes and scored a touchdown.

Gaffney recorded 36 receptions for 449 yards and 5 touchdowns during the 2007 regular season. On December 3, 2007, against the Baltimore Ravens, he caught an 8-yard game-winning touchdown pass from Tom Brady with 44 seconds remaining to keep the Patriots undefeated.

Gaffney finished the 2008 season with 38 receptions for 468 yards and two touchdowns.

=== Denver Broncos ===
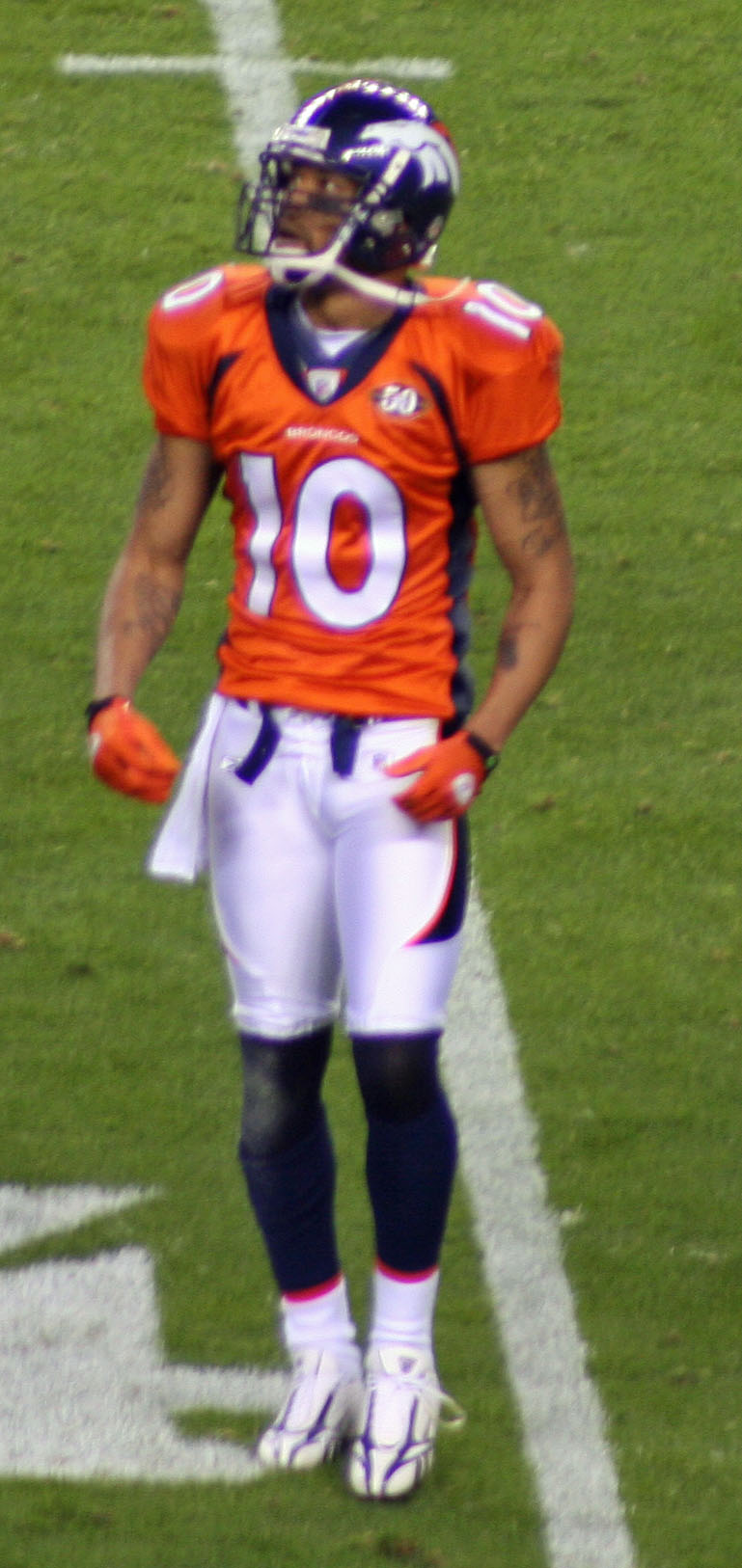
Gaffney with the Broncos in 2009

On February 27, 2009, Gaffney signed a four-year, $10 million contract with the Denver Broncos. In the Broncos' week 17 loss to the Kansas City Chiefs, Gaffney caught 14 passes for 213 yards as the Broncos played without Brandon Marshall, who was benched for disciplinary reasons by head coach Josh McDaniels. He finished the 2009 season with 54 receptions for 732 yards and two touchdowns, ranking second on the team in receptions and receiving yards. Gaffney put up 875 yards in 2010.

=== Washington Redskins ===
Gaffney was traded to the Washington Redskins for defensive end Jeremy Jarmon on July 27, 2011. In 2011, he led the team with 68 receptions, 947 yards and 5 touchdowns, all career bests.

On April 18, 2012, Gaffney announced that he was told not to attend the team's offseason conditioning program and that the Redskins were attempting to trade him. Head coach Mike Shanahan later stated that Gaffney could still remain on the Redskins, but felt obligated to let him explore other options throughout the league.

Gaffney was released by the Redskins on May 1, 2012.

=== New England Patriots (second stint) ===
Gaffney signed a two-year contract to return to the Patriots on May 2, 2012. He was released by the team on August 27.

=== Miami Dolphins ===
On October 2, 2012, Gaffney was signed by the Miami Dolphins. On November 20, 2012, Gaffney was waived. Days after his release, the NFL announced that Gaffney would be suspended for two games for failing to report an arrest to the league that occurred in Miami in 2010.

== NFL career statistics ==
Year	Team	GP	Receiving							Fumbles	
Year	Team	GP	Rec	Tgt	Yds	Avg	Lng	TD	FD	Fum	Lost
2002	HOU	16	41	—	483	11.8	27	1	27	0	0
2003	HOU	16	34	—	402	11.8	33	2	21	0	0
2004	HOU	16	41	—	632	15.4	69	2	34	0	0
2005	HOU	16	55	—	492	8.9	29	2	31	0	0
2006	NE	11	11	20	142	12.9	33	1	9	0	0
2007	NE	16	36	50	449	12.5	56	5	21	0	0
2008	NE	16	38	65	468	12.3	37	2	26	0	0
2009	DEN	16	54	88	732	13.6	49	2	36	0	0
2010	DEN	16	65	112	875	13.5	50	2	42	1	0
2011	WAS	16	68	115	947	13.9	45	5	50	1	1
2012	MIA	3	4	11	68	17.0	30	0	3	0	0
Career		158	447	461	5,690	12.7	69	24	300	2	1

== Legal Issues ==
In February 2000, Gaffney was charged with allegedly stealing $245 and a watch from the Florida Field locker room during the high school state championships, but the prosecutor placed him in a pretrial diversion program. After Steve Spurrier kicked him off the team in December 1999, he was eventually allowed to earn his way back onto the squad but forfeited his scholarship for a year.

During the 2001 season, Gaffney and another athlete forcefully detained a 15-year-old boy who was stealing motor scooters from their apartment, and held him until police arrived. The boy's mother later alleged that Gaffney beat, kicked, choked and attempted to drown her son. The police declined to file charges and the state attorney agreed, stating the mother's allegations were inconsistent with the evidence and no jury would convict given the circumstances.

In 2006, Gaffney was arrested and charged with unlawful possession of a handgun in New Jersey.

In 2010, Gaffney was charged with non-violent resisting arrest.

In January 2016, he was arrested for marijuana and drug possession.

In October 2017, Gaffney was arrested for domestic battery.

== Family ==
Gaffney and ex-wife Terin have a son, Jackson Tyrel Gaffney, and a daughter, Teagan Danae Gaffney. He is the son of former New York Jets wide receiver Derrick Gaffney, and the first cousin of NFL cornerback Lito Sheppard.

== See also ==
- List of Florida Gators football All-Americans
- List of Florida Gators in the NFL draft
- List of Houston Texans players
- List of New England Patriots players
- List of Washington Redskins players
