= Reche Caldwell =

American football player (1979–2020)

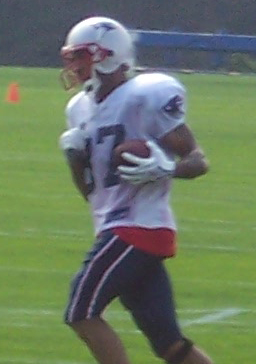
- Caldwell with the New England Patriots in 2006

No. 82, 87, 86
- Position: Wide receiver

Personal information
- Born: March 28, 1979; Tampa, Florida, U.S.
- Died: June 6, 2020 (aged 41); Tampa, Florida, U.S.
- Listed height: 6 ft 0 in (1.83 m)
- Listed weight: 210 lb (95 kg)

Career information
- High school: Thomas Jefferson (Tampa, Florida)
- College: Florida
- NFL draft: 2002: 2nd round, 48th overall pick

Career history
- San Diego Chargers (2002–2005); New England Patriots (2006); Washington Redskins (2007); St. Louis Rams (2008)*
- * Offseason or practice squad member only

Awards and highlights
- Second-team All-SEC (2001)

Career NFL statistics
- Receptions: 152
- Receiving yards: 1,851
- Receiving touchdowns: 11
- Stats at Pro Football Reference

Donald Reche Caldwell Jr. (/rɪˈʃeɪ/ rih-SHAY or /ˈriːʃeɪ/ REE-shay; March 28, 1979 – June 6, 2020) was an American professional football player who was a wide receiver in the National Football League (NFL) for six seasons in the 2000s with the San Diego Chargers, New England Patriots and Washington Redskins. Caldwell played college football for the Florida Gators.

== Early life ==
Caldwell was born in Tampa, Florida, in 1979. He attended Jefferson High School in Tampa, where he was a three-sport standout in high school football, basketball and baseball for the Jefferson Dragons. In football, Caldwell started at tailback as a freshman; as a sophomore, he converted to quarterback—a position he had never played—and threw for 6,936 yards and 77 touchdowns as a three-year starter. As a junior in 1996, he threw for 2,338 yards, led the Dragons to the Class 5A state semifinal game, earned high school All-American honors from PrepStar, and was named the Florida Class 5A Player of the Year. He was a first-team all-state selection in 1996 and a second-team selection in 1997.

In four high school baseball seasons, he set the Jefferson Dragons' career records for batting average (.379), doubles (25), triples (six), steals (67) and runs (76). The Cincinnati Reds selected him in the 1998 MLB draft, but he decided to play college football instead.

== College career ==
Caldwell accepted an athletic scholarship to attend the University of Florida in Gainesville, where he was a three-year letterman for coach Steve Spurrier's Gators teams from 1998 to 2001. As a junior in 2001, he was a third-team All-American selection by The National Sports Bureau, an honorable mention All-American selection by the Football News, a semi-finalist for the Fred Biletnikoff Award (annually given to nation's top receiver), and a second-team All-Southeastern Conference selection. He finished his impressive junior season with sixty-five receptions for 1,059 yards (an average of 16.3 yards per catch) and ten touchdowns, becoming only the ninth receiver in Gators history to gain over 1,000 yards receiving in a single season. Caldwell majored in leisure service management.

== Professional career ==
Pre-draft measurables
Height	Weight	Arm length	Hand span	40-yard dash	20-yard shuttle	Three-cone drill	Vertical jump	Broad jump
5 ft 11 3/4 in (1.82 m)	194 lb (88 kg)	32 in (0.81 m)	9 3/4 in (0.25 m)	4.53 s	4.10 s	7.00 s	41.5 in (1.05 m)	10 ft 10 in (3.30 m)
All values from NFL Combine

=== San Diego Chargers ===
Caldwell was selected by the San Diego Chargers in the second round of the 2002 NFL draft with the 48th overall pick. He played for the Chargers for four seasons from 2002 to 2005. In his rookie season, he had twenty-two catches for 208 yards and three touchdowns and returned nine kickoffs for a 24.4-yard average. In 2003, he played in nine games with four starts for the Chargers; he caught eight passes for eighty yards and rushed for thirty-nine yards on five carries.

His 2004 season began with three touchdown receptions in the Chargers' first five games. However, in a game against the Atlanta Falcons in Week 6, Caldwell suffered a knee injury, tearing his anterior cruciate ligament (ACL), and was lost for the season. He returned to play a full season in 2005.

=== New England Patriots ===
Caldwell subsequently signed with the New England Patriots prior to the 2006 season. He went on to total over 60 catches and 700 yards on the season. During a playoff game against the Chargers, Caldwell had seven receptions for 80 yards, including a four-yard touchdown reception from quarterback Tom Brady in the fourth quarter. A week later in the AFC Championship game, he dropped two passes during the Patriots' 38–34 loss to the Indianapolis Colts. Caldwell was released by the Patriots four days before the first game of the 2007 season.

=== Washington Redskins ===
Caldwell signed a one-year contract with the Washington Redskins in September 2007. During the 2007 season, he appeared in eight games for the Redskins with fifteen receptions for 141 yards.

=== St. Louis Rams ===
On March 25, 2008, Caldwell signed a one-year contract with the St. Louis Rams. However, he was released during the final preseason roster cuts.

In his six-season NFL career, Caldwell appeared in seventy-one games, starting in twenty-nine of them, while making 152 receptions for 1,851 yards and eleven touchdowns. He also tallied fourteen carries for 108 yards rushing.

== NFL career statistics ==
Legend
**Bold**	Career high

=== Regular season ===
Year	Team	Games		Receiving					
Year	Team	GP	GS	Tgt	Rec	Yds	Avg	Lng	TD
2002	SD	**16**	2	43	22	208	9.5	26	3
2003	SD	9	4	34	8	80	10.0	15	0
2004	SD	6	6	29	18	310	**17.2**	58	3
2005	SD	**16**	2	43	28	352	12.6	43	1
2006	NE	**16**	**14**	**102**	**61**	**760**	12.5	**62**	**4**
2007	WAS	8	1	22	15	141	9.4	19	0
		71	29	273	152	1,851	12.2	62	11

=== Playoffs ===
Year	Team	Games		Receiving					
Year	Team	GP	GS	Tgt	Rec	Yds	Avg	Lng	TD
2006	NE	**3**	**3**	**24**	**16**	**176**	**11.0**	**49**	**1**
2007	WAS	1	0	4	1	7	7.0	7	0
		4	3	28	17	183	10.8	49	1

== Personal life ==
Caldwell was the older brother of Andre Caldwell, former Florida Gators wide receiver and NFL wide receiver and kick returner.

On May 14, 2014, Caldwell was arrested for drug possession and intent to distribute. On January 30, 2015, he was sentenced to 27 months in federal prison and three years probation for possession of MDMA with intent to distribute. In addition, he pleaded guilty to drug charges involving marijuana and ecstasy, along with charges involving gambling.

On December 12, 2019, Caldwell was accused by the Justice Department of conspiracy to commit health care fraud. He pleaded guilty to one charge of conspiracy to commit health fraud on January 23, 2020, and was set to be sentenced in June 2020.

== Death ==
Caldwell was shot and killed on June 6, 2020. According to his mother, the shooting occurred during an attempted robbery. Police reported that the killing did not appear to be random, and that the apparent robbery may have been planned.

== See also ==
- List of Florida Gators in the NFL draft
- List of New England Patriots players
- List of Washington Redskins players
