= Stephen Anderson (American football) =

American football player (born 1993)

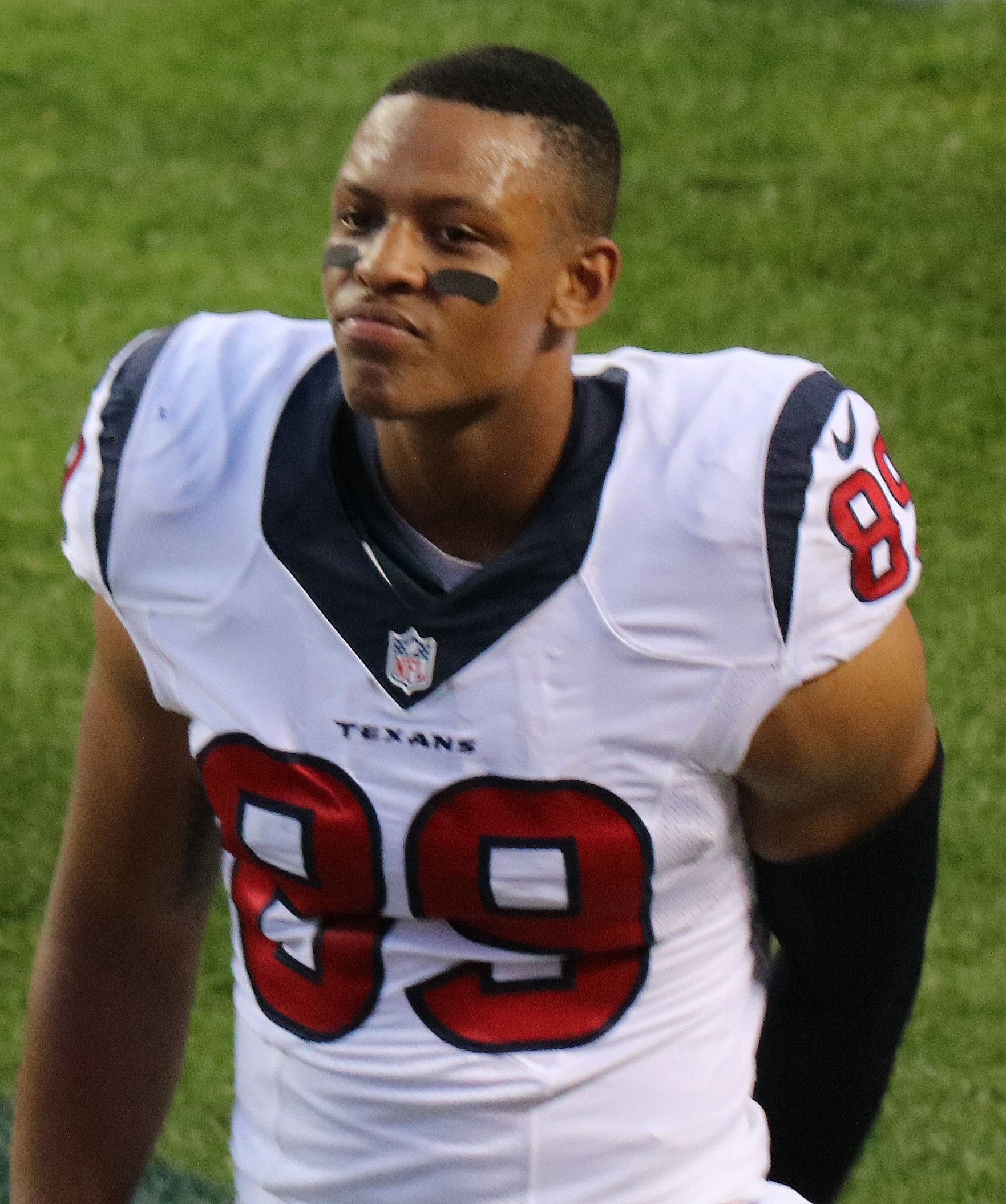
- Anderson with the Houston Texans in 2016

No. 89
- Position: Tight end

Personal information
- Born: January 30, 1993 (age 33); San Jose, California, U.S.
- Listed height: 6 ft 3 in (1.91 m)
- Listed weight: 230 lb (104 kg)

Career information
- High school: Piedmont Hills (San Jose)
- College: California (2011–2015)
- NFL draft: 2016: undrafted

Career history
- Houston Texans (2016–2017); New England Patriots (2018); Los Angeles Chargers (2019–2021); Arizona Cardinals (2022); Los Angeles Chargers (2023)

Awards and highlights
- Super Bowl champion (LIII)

Career NFL statistics
- Receptions: 63
- Receiving yards: 715
- Receiving touchdowns: 3
- Stats at Pro Football Reference

Stephen Todd Anderson Jr. (born January 30, 1993) is an American former professional football player who was a tight end in the National Football League (NFL). He played college football for the California Golden Bears and signed with the Houston Texans as an undrafted free agent in 2016. He has also played for the New England Patriots and the Los Angeles Chargers.

== Early life ==
Anderson attended and played high school football for Piedmont Hills High School. He graduated from Piedmont Hills in 2011 and attended the University of California, Berkeley.

== College career ==
Anderson played college football for the California Golden Bears from 2011 to 2015.

Anderson redshirted as a true freshman in 2011. As a redshirt freshman in 2012, he appeared in four games. In the 2013 season opener against Portland State, he had his first three career collegiate receptions for 22 yards. Overall, in the 2013 season, he had 14 receptions for 125 yards. His role in the offense expanded in 2014. On September 20, against Arizona, he had 43 receiving yards and his first collegiate touchdown. In the next game, against Colorado, he had seven receptions for 136 yards and a touchdown. In the next game at Washington State, he had five receptions for 95 yards. On October 24, in the game against Oregon at Levi's Stadium, he had 32 receiving yards and a touchdown in the loss. On November 1, against Oregon State, he had nine receptions for 117 yards. Overall, in the 2014 season, he had 46 receptions for 661 yards and five touchdowns. His production dropped in the 2015 season, but he remained as a presence in the offense. On October 10, against Utah, he had six receptions for a season-high 99 yards. In the 2015 season, he finished with 41 receptions for 474 yards and two touchdowns. Overall, he played in 37 games with 25 starts all during the last four seasons of his five campaigns with the program. He finished his career with 101 receptions for 1,260 yards and seven touchdowns. He earned both honorable mention All-Pac-12 selection of the league's coaches and Cal's Ken Cotton Award as the team's Most Courageous Player as a junior and senior.

== Professional career ==
=== Pre-draft ===
Anderson was one of 15 tight ends to receive an invitation to attend the NFL Combine. Although he primarily played wide receiver at Cal, he chose to transition to tight end. He was limited to performing the bench press, vertical jump, and broad jump due to a hamstring injury. Anderson was the lightest tight end and tied UCLA's Thomas Duarte as the shortest of the tight ends at 6'2". Among his position group at the combine, he finished first in the vertical jump (38"), fourth in the broad jump (9'11"), and tenth in the bench press (16). On March 18, 2016, Anderson opted to participate at Cal's pro day, along with Jared Goff, Bryce Treggs, Daniel Lasco, Maurice Harris, Kenny Lawler, Trevor Davis, Kyle Kragen, Stefan McClure, Darius Powe, and two others. His performance in the 40-yard dash, 20-yard dash, and 10-yard dash would've finished first among his position group at the combine. Anderson's time in the three-cone drill would've garnered him fourth place. He also ran positional drills and caught passes for the team representatives and scouts from all 32 NFL teams. At the conclusion of the pre-draft process, Anderson was projected to be selected as early as the fourth to fifth round or as late as the sixth to seventh round. He was ranked as the top fullback prospect in the draft by NFLDraftScout.com.

Pre-draft measurables
| Height | Weight | Arm length | Hand span | 40-yard dash | 10-yard split | 20-yard split | 20-yard shuttle | Three-cone drill | Vertical jump | Broad jump | Bench press |
|---|---|---|---|---|---|---|---|---|---|---|---|
| 6 ft 2 1/8 in (1.88 m) | 230 lb (104 kg) | 32 in (0.81 m) | 9 1/4 in (0.23 m) | 4.64 s | 1.59 s | 2.69 s | 4.13 s | 6.95 s | 38 in (0.97 m) | 9 ft 11 in (3.02 m) | 16 reps |
All values from NFL Combine/Cal's Pro Day

=== Houston Texans ===
==== 2016 ====
Anderson went undrafted in the 2016 NFL draft. On April 30, 2016, the Houston Texans signed Anderson as an undrafted free agent to a three-year, $1.62 million contract that includes a $5,000 signing bonus.

Throughout his first training camp, he competed with Anthony Denham and Eric Tomlinson for a roster spot. Anderson received a bulk of first team reps during training camp after C. J. Fiedorowicz and Ryan Griffin missed stretches of camp due to injuries. Head coach Bill O'Brien named Anderson the Texans' third tight end, behind C. J. Fiedorowicz and Ryan Griffin, to begin the regular season. Offensive coordinator George Godsey developed a hybrid H-back role for Anderson, better utilizing his speed and receiving ability.

He made his professional regular season debut in the Texans' season-opener against the Chicago Bears and caught three passes for 25 yards during the 23–14 victory. He made his first career reception at the start of the second quarter, catching a 12-yard pass from Brock Osweiler before being tackled by Bears' safety Adrian Amos. In Week 3, Anderson suffered a hamstring injury during the Texans' 27–0 loss at the New England Patriots. Unfortunately, the injured hamstring caused him to miss the next three games (Weeks 4–6). On November 13, 2016, Anderson caught a seven-yard touchdown pass from Brock Osweiler, as the Texans defeated the Jacksonville Jaguars 24–21. He finished his rookie season in 2016 with a total of 11 receptions for 93 receiving yards and one touchdown in 13 games.

The Houston Texans finished atop the AFC South with a 9–7 record in 2016. On January 7, 2017, Anderson made his playoff debut in the Texans 24–17 AFC Wild Card Round victory over the Oakland Raiders. They were eliminated in the Divisional Round after losing a 34–16 game to the eventual Super Bowl LI champion Patriots.

==== 2017 ====
He competed for a roster spot throughout training camp against Rashaun Allen, Evan Baylis, and Zach Conque. He was named the Texans' third tight end on their depth chart behind Fiedorowicz and Griffin.

He earned his first career start in the Texans' season-opener against the Jaguars and caught two passes for 14 yards before leaving the game after suffering a concussion. C. J. Fiedorowicz and Ryan Griffin also suffered concussions during the Texans' 29–7 loss. He remained in concussion protocol and was inactive for the Texans' Thursday Night Football game against the Cincinnati Bengals four days later. On October 8, 2017, Anderson caught two passes for a season-high 63 yards in Houston's 42–34 loss to the Kansas City Chiefs. Anderson became the second tight end on the Texans' depth chart after C. J. Fiedorowicz missed eight games after suffering his second concussion. On December 3, 2017, Anderson caught a season-high five passes for 79 yards and a touchdown in the Texans' 24–13 loss at the Tennessee Titans. His first touchdown of the season came on a four-yard pass by Tom Savage in the second quarter. Overall, he finished his second professional season with 25 receptions for 342 yards and a touchdown.

On September 1, 2018, Anderson was waived by the Texans.

=== New England Patriots ===
On September 6, 2018, Anderson was signed to the Patriots' practice squad. He was promoted to the active roster on January 8, 2019. Anderson won Super Bowl LIII after the Patriots defeated the Los Angeles Rams 13–3. He was waived during final roster cuts on August 31, 2019. He was signed to the practice squad a day later. On September 9, 2019, he was released from the practice squad.

=== Los Angeles Chargers (first stint) ===
On September 11, 2019, Anderson was signed to the Los Angeles Chargers practice squad. He was promoted to the active roster on October 1, 2019. He played in his lone game of the 2019 season in Week 5. He was waived on October 12 and re-signed to the practice squad. He signed a futures contract with the Chargers on December 30, 2019.

In the 2020 season, Anderson appeared in 16 games. He recorded eight receptions for 106 receiving yards and mainly played on special teams.

Anderson re-signed with the Chargers to a one-year contract on March 22, 2021. On the 2021 season, he had 16 receptions for 165 receiving yards and one receiving touchdown.

=== Arizona Cardinals ===
On April 4, 2022, Anderson signed with the Arizona Cardinals on a one-year contract. He was released during final roster cuts on August 30, but quickly re–signed with the team two days later. He appeared in 16 games in the 2022 season. He had three receptions for nine yards on the year and a majority of his playing time was on special teams.

=== Los Angeles Chargers (second stint) ===
On November 15, 2023, Anderson was signed to the Chargers practice squad. His contract expired at the end of the season and he did not sign a reserve/future contract, thus becoming a free agent.

== Career statistics ==
=== NFL ===
| Year | Tm | G | GS | Tgt | Rec | Yds | Y/R | TD | Lng | R/G | Y/G |
|---|---|---|---|---|---|---|---|---|---|---|---|
| 2016 | HOU | 13 | 0 | 16 | 11 | 93 | 8.5 | 1 | 14 | 0.8 | 7.2 |
| 2017 | HOU | 15 | 5 | 52 | 25 | 342 | 13.7 | 1 | 42 | 1.7 | 22.8 |
| 2018 | NE | 0 | 0 | DNP | | | | | | | |
| 2019 | LAC | 1 | 0 | 0 | 0 | 0 | 0.0 | 0 | 0 | 0.0 | 0.0 |
| 2020 | LAC | 16 | 3 | 11 | 8 | 106 | 13.3 | 0 | 23 | 0.5 | 6.6 |
| 2021 | LAC | 17 | 4 | 19 | 16 | 165 | 10.3 | 1 | 34 | 0.9 | 9.7 |
| 2022 | ARI | 16 | 0 | 7 | 3 | 9 | 3.0 | 0 | 6 | 0.2 | 0.6 |
| Career | | 78 | 12 | 105 | 63 | 715 | 11.3 | 3 | 42 | 0.8 | 9.2 |

=== College ===
| Season | Team | Class | Receiving | | | |
| Season | Team | Class | Rec | Yds | Avg | TD |
|---|---|---|---|---|---|---|
| 2013 | California | JR | 14 | 125 | 8.9 | 0 |
| 2014 | California | SR | 46 | 661 | 14.4 | 5 |
| 2015 | California | SR | 41 | 474 | 11.6 | 2 |
| Career | | | 101 | 1,260 | 12.5 | 7 |
