= 2016 Houston Texans season =

15th season in franchise history

- Owner: Bob McNair
- General manager: Rick Smith
- Head coach: Bill O'Brien
- Offensive coordinator: George Godsey
- Defensive coordinator: Romeo Crennel
- Home stadium: NRG Stadium

Results
- Record: 9–7
- Division place: 1st AFC South
- Playoffs: Won Wild Card Playoffs (vs. Raiders) 27–14; Lost Divisional Playoffs (at Patriots) 16–34
- All-Pros: 3: EDGE Jadeveon Clowney (1st team); LB Whitney Mercilus (2nd team); LB Benardrick McKinney (2nd team)
- Pro Bowlers: DE Jadeveon Clowney

Uniform
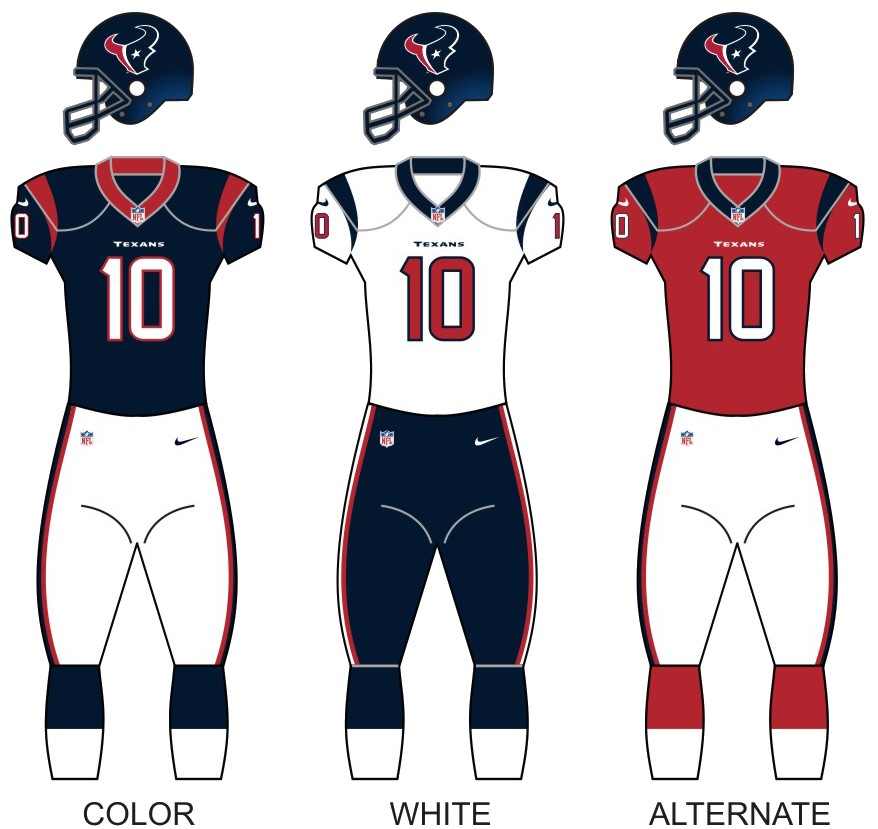

The 2016 season was the Houston Texans' 15th in the NFL and their third under head coach Bill O'Brien. The Texans' attempt to make history as the first team to play the Super Bowl on their home field, NRG Stadium, was thwarted in the second round of the 2016–17 NFL playoffs by the eventual Super Bowl LI champion New England Patriots.

The Texans finished 9–7 for the third season in a row and clinched the AFC South for the second season in a row, winning their fourth overall division title; the Texans finished tied with the Tennessee Titans, but won the tiebreaker based on record against division opponents. The 2016 season marked the first time in franchise history that the Texans swept the Indianapolis Colts. This marks the second time in team history that the Texans made the playoffs in back to back years, and the first since 2011–12. This was also the first time in their franchise history where their defense ranked number one in the league, despite losing their injured star defensive end J. J. Watt for most of the season, only allowing 20.5 points per game and only 301.3 yards per game.

The Texans defeated the Oakland Raiders 27–14 in the wild-card round and advanced to the divisional round for the first time since the 2012 season, but they lost to the New England Patriots 34–16.

== Draft ==
2016 Houston Texans draft
Round	Pick	Player	Position	College	Notes
1	21	Will Fuller	WR	Notre Dame	from Washington
2	50	Nick Martin	C	Notre Dame	from Atlanta
3	85	Braxton Miller	WR	Ohio State	
4	119	Tyler Ervin	RB	San Jose State	
5	159	K. J. Dillon	S	West Virginia	
5	166	D. J. Reader	DT	Clemson	from New England
Made roster † Pro Football Hall of Fame * Made at least one Pro Bowl during career

Notes

- The Texans traded their sixth-round selection and wide receiver Keshawn Martin to the New England Patriots in exchange for the Patriots' fifth-round selection.
- The Texans made multiple trades within the seventh round:
  - Acquiring a conditional seventh-round selection in a trade that sent quarterback Ryan Fitzpatrick to the New York Jets; this selection was upgraded to a sixth-rounder after Fitzpatrick played more than 70% of the Jets snaps in 2015;
  - Acquiring an additional seventh-round selection in a trade that sent quarterback Case Keenum to the St. Louis Rams (now Los Angeles Rams);
  - Trading a seventh-round selection to the Denver Broncos in exchange for offensive tackle Chris Clark;
  - Trading a seventh-round selection to the New England Patriots in exchange for quarterback Ryan Mallett.
- Exact numbers of the selections from rounds 4–7 were determined when compensatory selections were awarded on March 11.

== Staff ==
2016 Houston Texans staff
Front office: Founder/chairman/CEO – Bob McNair; Vice chairman – D. Cal McNair; Executive vice president/general manager – Rick Smith; President – Jamey Rootes; Vice president of football administration – Chris Olsen; Vice president of football operations – Doug West; Director of player personnel – Brian Gaine; Director of college scouting – Jon Carr; Director of football research – Jim Bernhardt; Assistant director of pro personnel – Larry Wright; Head coaches: Head coach – Bill O'Brien; Offensive coaches: Offensive coordinator – George Godsey; Running backs – Charles London; Wide receivers – Sean Ryan; Tight ends – John Perry; Offensive line – Mike Devlin; Offensive assistant – Pat O'Hara; Offensive quality control/assistant offensive line – Tim Kelly	Defensive coaches: Defensive coordinator – Romeo Crennel; Defensive line – Anthony Weaver; Linebackers – Mike Vrabel; Secondary – John Butler; Assistant secondary – Anthony Midget; Defensive assistant – Shane Bowen; Defensive quality control – Will Lawing; Special teams coaches: Special teams coordinator – Larry Izzo; Assistant special teams – Doug Colman; Strength and conditioning: Head strength and conditioning – Craig Fitzgerald; Assistant strength and conditioning – Sean Hayes; Assistant strength and conditioning – Brian Bell; Assistant strength and conditioning – Ian Jones

== Final roster ==
2016 Houston Texans roster
Quarterbacks (QB): 3 Tom Savage; 17 Brock Osweiler; 5 Brandon Weeden; Running backs (RB): 28 Alfred Blue; 34 Tyler Ervin RS; 41 Jonathan Grimes; 33 Akeem Hunt; 26 Lamar Miller; 45 Jay Prosch FB; Wide receivers (WR): 15 Will Fuller; 10 DeAndre Hopkins; 12 Keith Mumphery; 82 Wendall Williams; Tight ends (TE): 89 Stephen Anderson; 87 C. J. Fiedorowicz; 84 Ryan Griffin	Offensive linemen (OL): 78 Oday Aboushi G; 79 Jeff Allen G; 68 Tony Bergstrom C; 76 Duane Brown T; 74 Chris Clark T; 63 Kendall Lamm T; 65 Greg Mancz C; 71 Xavier Suʻa-Filo G; 73 Josh Walker G; Defensive linemen (DL): 95 Christian Covington DE; 90 Jadeveon Clowney DE; 93 Joel Heath DE; 97 Ufomba Kamalu DE; 98 D. J. Reader NT; 94 Antonio Smith DE; 75 Vince Wilfork NT	Linebackers (LB): 53 Max Bullough ILB; 56 Brian Cushing ILB; 50 Akeem Dent OLB; 55 Benardrick McKinney ILB; 59 Whitney Mercilus OLB; 52 Brian Peters ILB; 57 Brennan Scarlett OLB; 51 John Simon OLB; Defensive backs (DB): 21 A. J. Bouye CB; 27 Quintin Demps SS; 29 Andre Hal FS; 25 Kareem Jackson CB; 20 Don Jones FS; 24 Johnathan Joseph CB; 43 Corey Moore S; 32 Robert Nelson CB; 35 Eddie Pleasant SS; 22 Denzel Rice CB; Special teams (ST): 8 Nick Novak K; 9 Shane Lechler P; 46 Jon Weeks LS	Practice squad: 70 Jeff Adams T; 88 RaShaun Allen TE; 14 Quenton Bundrage WR (IR); 92 Brandon Dunn NT; 64 Laurence Gibson T; 38 Kenny Hilliard RB; 85 Tevin Jones WR; 47 Eric Lee OLB; 96 Dan Pettinato DE; 42 Shakeel Rashad ILB; 62 Chad Slade G; Reserve: 39 Lonnie Ballentine FS (IR); 36 K. J. Dillon SS (IR); 23 Kurtis Drummond SS (IR); 7 Kaʻimi Fairbairn K (IR); 30 Kevin Johnson CB (IR); 66 Nick Martin C (IR); 13 Braxton Miller WR (IR); 72 Derek Newton T (IR); 77 David Quessenberry T (NF-Ill.); 48 Gerald Rivers OLB (IR); 91 Devon Still DE (IR); 11 Jaelen Strong WR (IR); 49 Tony Washington OLB (IR); 99 J. J. Watt DE (IR); Rookies in italics 53 active, 15 reserve, 10 practice squad

== Schedule ==
=== Preseason ===
Week	Date	Opponent	Result	Record	Venue	Recap
1	August 14	at San Francisco 49ers	**W** 24–13	1–0	Levi's Stadium	Recap
2	August 20	New Orleans Saints	**W** 16–9	2–0	NRG Stadium	Recap
3	August 28	Arizona Cardinals	**W** 34–24	3–0	NRG Stadium	Recap
4	September 1	at Dallas Cowboys	**W** 28–17	4–0	AT&T Stadium	Recap

=== Regular season ===
Week	Date	Opponent	Result	Record	Venue	Recap
1	September 11	Chicago Bears	**W** 23–14	1–0	NRG Stadium	Recap
2	September 18	Kansas City Chiefs	**W** 19–12	2–0	NRG Stadium	Recap
3	September 22	at New England Patriots	**L** 0–27	2–1	Gillette Stadium	Recap
4	October 2	**Tennessee Titans**	**W** 27–20	3–1	NRG Stadium	Recap
5	October 9	at Minnesota Vikings	**L** 13–31	3–2	U.S. Bank Stadium	Recap
6	October 16	**Indianapolis Colts**	**W** 26–23 (OT)	4–2	NRG Stadium	Recap
7	October 24	at Denver Broncos	**L** 9–27	4–3	Sports Authority Field at Mile High	Recap
8	October 30	Detroit Lions	**W** 20–13	5–3	NRG Stadium	Recap
9	Bye					
10	November 13	at **Jacksonville Jaguars**	**W** 24–21	6–3	EverBank Field	Recap
11	November 21	at Oakland Raiders	**L** 20–27	6–4	Estadio Azteca (Mexico City)	Recap
12	November 27	San Diego Chargers	**L** 13–21	6–5	NRG Stadium	Recap
13	December 4	at Green Bay Packers	**L** 13–21	6–6	Lambeau Field	Recap
14	December 11	at **Indianapolis Colts**	**W** 22–17	7–6	Lucas Oil Stadium	Recap
15	December 18	**Jacksonville Jaguars**	**W** 21–20	8–6	NRG Stadium	Recap
16	December 24	Cincinnati Bengals	**W** 12–10	9–6	NRG Stadium	Recap
17	January 1	at **Tennessee Titans**	**L** 17–24	9–7	Nissan Stadium	Recap

Note: Intra-division opponents are in bold text.

=== Postseason ===
Round	Date	Opponent (seed)	Result	Record	Venue	Recap
Wild Card	January 7, 2017	Oakland Raiders (5)	**W** 27–14	1–0	NRG Stadium	Recap
Divisional	January 14, 2017	at New England Patriots (1)	**L** 16–34	1–1	Gillette Stadium	Recap

== Game summaries ==
=== Regular season ===
==== Week 1: vs. Chicago Bears ====
Week One: Chicago Bears at Houston Texans – Game summary

Quarter	1	2	3	4	Total
Bears	7	7	0	0	14
Texans	0	10	3	10	23

at NRG Stadium, Houston, Texas

- Date: September 11
- Game time: 12:00 p.m. CDT
- Game weather: Played indoors (retractable roof stadium, roof closed)
- Game attendance: 71,933
- Referee: Pete Morelli
- TV announcers (Fox): Thom Brennaman, Charles Davis and Peter Schrager
- Recap, Gamebook

Game information

First quarter

- CHI – Jeremy Langford 1-yard run (Connor Barth kick), 6:58. Bears 7–0. Drive: 8 plays, 75 yards, 4:31.

Second quarter

- HOU – Nick Novak 28-yard field goal, 11:25. Bears 7–3. Drive: 14 plays, 59 yards, 6:19.
- HOU – DeAndre Hopkins 23-yard pass from Brock Osweiler (Nick Novak kick), 3:14. Texans 10–7. Drive: 10 plays, 61 yards, 4:49.
- CHI – Eddie Royal 19-yard pass from Jay Cutler (Connor Barth kick), 0:07. Bears 14–10. Drive: 3 plays, 75 yards, 0:31.

Third quarter

- HOU – Nick Novak 28-yard field goal, 12:17. Bears 14–13. Drive: 5 plays, 15 yards, 1:50.

Fourth quarter

- HOU – Will Fuller 18-yard pass from Brock Osweiler (Nick Novak kick), 12:44. Texans 20–14. Drive: 9 plays, 64 yards, 4:52.
- HOU – Nick Novak 38-yard field goal, 6:10. Texans 23–14. Drive: 7 plays, 46 yards, 2:51.

Top passers

- CHI – Jay Cutler – 16/29, 216 yards, TD, INT
- HOU – Brock Osweiler – 22/35, 231 yards, 2 TD, INT

Top rushers

- CHI – Jeremy Langford – 17 rushes, 57 yards, TD
- HOU – Lamar Miller – 28 rushes, 106 yards

Top receivers

- CHI – Alshon Jeffery – 4 receptions, 105 yards
- HOU – Will Fuller – 5 receptions, 107 yards, TD

Brock Osweiler started his first regular season game for the Texans at home against the Chicago Bears. Houston received the ball first and made it all the way to the Chicago 34 before an Osweiler pass was intercepted by Tracy Porter. The Bears capitalized on the turnover with a 1-yard run from Jeremy Langford. In the 2nd quarter, Jay Cutler fumbled the ball on 4th and 1 at the Houston 31. Cutler recovered the fumble but the drive was turned over on downs. Houston scored on the following drive with a 28-yard field goal from Nick Novak. Following a slow offensive start in the first half, Houston trailed Chicago 10–14 at halftime. Momentum shifted in the 2nd half in favor of the Texans, outscoring the Bears 13–0. With the win, Houston improved to 4–0 all time against Chicago.

==== Week 2: vs. Kansas City Chiefs ====
Week Two: Kansas City Chiefs at Houston Texans – Game summary

Quarter	1	2	3	4	Total
Chiefs	0	3	0	9	12
Texans	7	6	0	6	19

at NRG Stadium, Houston, Texas

- Date: September 18
- Game time: 12:00 p.m. CDT
- Game weather: Played indoors (retractable roof stadium, roof closed)
- Game attendance: 71,890
- Referee: Tony Corrente
- TV announcers (CBS): Spero Dedes and Solomon Wilcots
- Recap, Gamebook

Game information

First quarter

- HOU – DeAndre Hopkins 27-yard pass from Brock Osweiler (Nick Novak kick), 8:01. Texans 7–0. Drive: 1 play, 27 yards, 0:07.

Second quarter

- KC – Cairo Santos 53-yard field goal, 14:55. Texans 7–3. Drive: 4 plays, −2 yards, 1:17.
- HOU – Nick Novak 32-yard field goal, 4:16. Texans 10–3. Drive: 14 plays, 69 yards, 6:43.
- HOU – Nick Novak 24-yard field goal, 1:21. Texans 13–3. Drive: 4 plays, 8 yards, 0:19.

Third quarter

- No scoring plays

Fourth quarter

- KC – Cairo Santos 43-yard field goal, 14:56. Texans 13–6. Drive: 5 plays, 26 yards, 2:50.
- HOU – Nick Novak 31-yard field goal, 9:34. Texans 16–6. Drive: 11 plays, 47 yards, 5:22.
- KC – Cairo Santos 35-yard field goal, 7:34. Texans 16–9. Drive: 8 plays, 52 yards, 2:00.
- HOU – Nick Novak 43-yard field goal, 2:56. Texans 19–9. Drive: 11 plays, 49 yards, 4:38.
- KC – Cairo Santos 30-yard field goal, 0:49. Texans 19–12. Drive: 10 plays, 76 yards, 2:07.

Top passers

- KC – Alex Smith – 20/37, 186 yards
- HOU – Brock Osweiler – 19/33, 268 yards, TD, 2 INT

Top rushers

- KC – Charcandrick West – 6 rushes, 61 yards
- HOU – Lamar Miller – 25 rushes, 83 yards

Top receivers

- KC – Jeremy Maclin – 6 receptions, 68 yards
- HOU – DeAndre Hopkins – 7 receptions, 113 yards, TD

The Texans stayed at home for week 2 where they hosted the Kansas City Chiefs, going 0–2 against the Chiefs the previous season, including a 30–0 shutout loss in the wild-card round. Houston's defense managed Kansas City's offense, holding the Chiefs to only 4 Cairo Santos field goals. The only touchdown of the game came on a 27-yard pass from Brock Osweiler to DeAndre Hopkins in the 1st quarter.

==== Week 3: at New England Patriots ====
Week Three: Houston Texans at New England Patriots – Game summary

Quarter	1	2	3	4	Total
Texans	0	0	0	0	0
Patriots	10	0	10	7	27

at Gillette Stadium, Foxborough, Massachusetts

- Date: September 22
- Game time: 8:25 p.m. EDT/7:25 p.m. CDT
- Game weather: 68 °F (20 °C), clear
- Game attendance: 66,829
- Referee: Walt Coleman
- TV announcers (CBS/NFLN/Twitter): Jim Nantz, Phil Simms and Tracy Wolfson
- Recap, Gamebook

Game information

First quarter

- NE – Stephen Gostkowski 24-yard field goal, 2:07. Patriots 3–0. Drive: 10 plays, 74 yards, 4:52.
- NE – Jacoby Brissett 27-yard run (Stephen Gostkowski kick), 1:54. Patriots 10–0. Drive: 1 play, 22 yards, 0:07.

Second quarter

- No scoring plays

Third quarter

- NE – Stephen Gostkowski 25-yard field goal, 8:19. Patriots 13–0. Drive: 13 plays, 71 yards, 6:41.
- NE – LeGarrette Blount 1-yard run (Stephen Gostkowski kick), 5:41. Patriots 20–0. Drive: 6 plays, 21 yards, 2:31.

Fourth quarter

- NE – LeGarrette Blount 41-yard run (Stephen Gostkowski kick), 11:00. Patriots 27–0. Drive: 2 plays, 47 yards, 0:40.

Top passers

- HOU – Brock Osweiler – 24/41, 196 yards, INT
- NE – Jacoby Brissett – 11/19, 103 yards

Top rushers

- HOU – Lamar Miller – 21 rushes, 80 yards
- NE – LeGarrette Blount – 24 rushes, 105 yards, 2 TD

Top receivers

- HOU – DeAndre Hopkins – 4 receptions, 56 yards
- NE – Julian Edelman – 4 receptions, 38 yards

The Houston Texans fell to the New England Patriots 27–0, dropping to 2–1 for the season. Problems started early for the Texans as Charles James fumbled a kick return that was recovered by Duron Harmon at the Houston 22. The fumble lead to a Jacoby Brissett 27-yard run to extended New England's lead to 10–0 following Stephen Gostkowski's kick late in the first quarter. On the Texans' next possession, a Brock Osweiler pass was intercepted by Jamie Collins. The Patriots gained the ball to start the second half and settled for a 25-yard Gostkowski field goal. On the ensuing kickoff, Tyler Ervin fumbled the ball with Jordan Richards recovering it. Like before, the fumble resulted in a New England touchdown with a 1-yard LeGarrette Blount run. The loss was Houston's first shutout loss since December 7, 2003, where the Texans fell to the Jacksonville Jaguars also by a score of 27–0. It was also head coach Bill O'Brien's first return to New England in 5 years, where he served as an offensive assistant in their undefeated regular season of 2007, as wide receivers coach in 2008, quarterbacks coach from 2009–10, and as offensive coordinator in 2011. O'Brien was also part of two AFC-winning Patriots teams in 2007 and 2011, losing the Super Bowl to the Eli Manning-led New York Giants on both occasions.

Days after the game, defensive end J. J. Watt underwent back surgery to repair a herniated disk. Watt missed the remainder of the 2016 season due to the surgery. Former Texan Antonio Smith was signed to the team to replace Watt for the season.

==== Week 4: vs. Tennessee Titans ====
Week Four: Tennessee Titans at Houston Texans – Game summary

Quarter	1	2	3	4	Total
Titans	3	14	3	0	20
Texans	14	6	7	0	27

at NRG Stadium, Houston, Texas

- Date: October 2
- Game time: 12:00 p.m. CDT
- Game weather: Played indoors (retractable roof stadium, roof closed)
- Game attendance: 71,054
- Referee: Clete Blakeman
- TV announcers (CBS): Tom McCarthy and Adam Archuleta
- Recap, Gamebook

Game information

First quarter

- HOU – C. J. Fiedorowicz 14-yard pass from Brock Osweiler (Nick Novak kick), 10:31. Texans 7–0. Drive: 9 plays, 75 yards, 4:29.
- HOU – Will Fuller 5-yard pass from Brock Osweiler (Nick Novak kick), 5:38. Texans 14–0. Drive: 6 plays, 80 yards, 2:47.
- TEN – Ryan Succop 48-yard field goal, 2:40. Texans 14–3. Drive: 7 plays, 42 yards, 2:58.

Second quarter

- HOU – Nick Novak 53-yard field goal, 13:47. Texans 17–3. Drive: 9 plays, 40 yards, 3:54.
- TEN – DeMarco Murray 2-yard run (Ryan Succop kick), 11:26. Texans 17–10. Drive: 5 plays, 78 yards, 2:21.
- TEN – DeMarco Murray 1-yard run (Ryan Succop kick), 2:28. Tied 17–17. Drive: 9 plays, 39 yards, 4:16.
- HOU – Nick Novak 45-yard field goal, 0:11. Texans 20–17. Drive: 4 plays, 17 yards, 0:39.

Third quarter

- TEN – Ryan Succop 26-yard field goal, 7:04. Tied 20–20. Drive: 13 plays, 59 yards, 7:56.
- HOU – Will Fuller 67-yard punt return (Nick Novak kick), 0:56. Texans 27–20.

Fourth quarter

- No scoring plays

Top passers

- TEN – Marcus Mariota – 13/29, 192 yards, INT
- HOU – Brock Osweiler – 25/37, 254 yards, 2 TD, 2 INT

Top rushers

- TEN – DeMarco Murray – 25 rushes, 95 yards, 2 TD
- HOU – Lamar Miller – 19 rushes, 82 yards

Top receivers

- TEN – Rishard Matthews – 2 receptions, 82 yards
- HOU – Will Fuller – 7 receptions, 81 yards, TD

Will Fuller's 67-yard punt return TD late in the third quarter helped the Texans defeat the Titans 27–20. With the victory, the Texans improved to 3–1. Houston also defeated Tennessee for the fifth straight time. The victory is the Texans' 100th overall win in franchise history.

==== Week 5: at Minnesota Vikings ====
Week Five: Houston Texans at Minnesota Vikings – Game summary

Quarter	1	2	3	4	Total
Texans	0	6	0	7	13
Vikings	14	10	0	7	31

at U.S. Bank Stadium, Minneapolis, Minnesota

- Date: October 9
- Game time: 12:00 p.m. CDT
- Game weather: Played indoors (dome stadium)
- Game attendance: 66,683
- Referee: Jeff Triplette
- TV announcers (CBS): Spero Dedes and Solomon Wilcots
- Recap, Gamebook

Game information

First quarter

- MIN – Adam Thielen 36-yard pass from Sam Bradford (Blair Walsh kick), 11:23. Vikings 7–0. Drive: 8 plays, 84 yards, 3:37.
- MIN – Matt Asiata 1-yard run (Blair Walsh kick), 6:28. Vikings 14–0. Drive: 8 plays, 55 yards, 3:52.

Second quarter

- MIN – Blair Walsh 19-yard field goal, 9:58. Vikings 17–0. Drive: 15 plays, 58 yards, 6:19.
- MIN – Marcus Sherels 79-yard punt return (Blair Walsh kick), 8:46. Vikings 24–0.
- HOU – Nick Novak 38-yard field goal, 5:42. Vikings 24–3. Drive: 8 plays, 55 yards, 3:04.
- HOU – Nick Novak 30-yard field goal, 1:37. Vikings 24–6. Drive: 10 plays, 42 yards, 2:04.

Third quarter

- No scoring plays

Fourth quarter

- MIN – Cordarrelle Patterson 9-yard pass from Sam Bradford (Blair Walsh kick), 14:09. Vikings 31–6. Drive: 9 plays, 65 yards, 4:42.
- HOU – DeAndre Hopkins 1-yard pass from Brock Osweiler (Nick Novak kick), 3:46. Vikings 31–13. Drive: 12 plays, 75 yards, 4:29.

Top passers

- HOU – Brock Osweiler – 19/42, 184 yards, TD, INT
- MIN – Sam Bradford – 22/30, 271 yards, 2 TD

Top rushers

- HOU – Alfred Blue – 6 rushes, 39 yards
- MIN – Matt Asiata – 14 rushes, 55 yards, TD

Top receivers

- HOU – C. J. Fiedorowicz – 4 receptions, 61 yards
- MIN – Adam Thielen – 7 receptions, 127 yards, TD

With the loss, the Texans fell to 3–2 and have yet to defeat the Vikings in franchise history.

==== Week 6: vs. Indianapolis Colts ====
Week Six: Indianapolis Colts at Houston Texans – Game summary

Quarter	1	2	3	4	OT	Total
Colts	3	10	0	10	0	23
Texans	0	3	6	14	3	26

at NRG Stadium, Houston, Texas

- Date: October 16
- Game time: 7:30 p.m. CDT
- Game weather: Played indoors (retractable roof stadium; roof closed)
- Game attendance: 71,891
- Referee: Bill Vinovich
- TV announcers (NBC): Al Michaels, Cris Collinsworth and Michele Tafoya
- Recap, Gamebook

Game information

First quarter

- IND – Adam Vinatieri 41-yard field goal, 5:56. Colts 3–0. Drive: 9 plays, 27 yards, 4:16.

Second quarter

- IND – Jack Doyle 22-yard pass from Andrew Luck (Adam Vinatieri kick), 14:55. Colts 10–0. Drive: 7 plays, 60 yards, 4:33.
- IND – Adam Vinatieri 37-yard field goal, 6:55. Colts 13–0. Drive: 10 plays, 74 yards, 5:12.
- HOU – Nick Novak 27-yard field goal, 1:57. Colts 13–3. Drive: 11 plays, 66 yards, 4:58.

Third quarter

- HOU – Lamar Miller 1-yard run (kick failed, wide right), 7:06. Colts 13–9. Drive: 10 plays, 82 yards, 5:13.

Fourth quarter

- IND – Andrew Luck 14-yard run (Adam Vinatieri kick), 14:53. Colts 20–9. Drive: 2 plays, 20 yards, 0:25.
- IND – Adam Vinatieri 36-yard field goal, 7:04. Colts 23–9. Drive: 10 plays, 66 yards, 5:17.
- HOU – Lamar Miller 10-yard pass from Brock Osweiler (Nick Novak kick), 2:37. Colts 23–16. Drive: 12 plays, 75 yards, 4:27.
- HOU – C. J. Fiedorowicz 26-yard pass from Brock Osweiler (Nick Novak kick), 0:49. Tied 23–23. Drive: 3 plays, 53 yards, 1:01.

Overtime

- HOU – Nick Novak 33-yard field goal, 8:10. Texans 26–23. Drive: 6 plays, 52 yards, 3:20.

Top passers

- IND – Andrew Luck – 21/32, 252 yards, TD, INT
- HOU – Brock Osweiler – 25/39, 269 yards, 2 TD, INT

Top rushers

- IND – Frank Gore – 22 rushes, 106 yards
- HOU – Lamar Miller – 24 rushes, 149 yards, TD

Top receivers

- IND – Chester Rogers – 4 receptions, 63 yards
- HOU – C. J. Fiedorowicz – 6 receptions, 85 yards, TD

The Texans hosted their divisional rivals, the Colts, in a prime time match up. Houston's offense got off to a slow start during the first half with the crowd booing quarterback Brock Osweiler numerous times. While the offense was struggling, Houston's defense kept them in the game to only trail 3–13 at halftime. The Texans' offense scored their first touchdown of the game midway through the third quarter with a 1-yard run from Lamar Miller. Miller's rushing touchdown was his first of the season and Houston's first rushing touchdown of the season. After Miller's touchdown run, Nick Novak missed the extra point, going wide right, to trail 9–13. The Texans' offense faltered again while the Colts started to pull away in the fourth quarter to lead 23–9 with 7:04 left in regulation. Down by 14, the Texans refused to give up and started a comeback against the Colts. Houston tied the game with 0:47 left in regulation on a 26-yard touchdown pass from Osweiler to tight end C. J. Fiedorowicz. With Novak making the extra point, the game was tied at 23–23. Indianapolis tried to win the game in regulation, but were forced to punt with 0:23 left in the game. Houston took the knee to close out the fourth.

The Colts received the ball to begin overtime, but failed to make it out of their own territory. On 3rd and 3 Andrew Luck was sacked by Benardrick McKinney for a 9-yard loss and Indianapolis was forced to punt the ball away. Houston made it into field goal territory after Osweiler found Jaelen Strong for a 36-yard pass at the Indianapolis 12-yard line. On the next play, Osweiler intentionally ran for a 3-yard loss to help set up a Novak field goal. After Osweiler's set up, Novak made the 33-yard field goal to win the game for the Texans, 26–23.

With the win, Houston went to 4–2 on the season, 4–0 at home, and extended their win streak over Indianapolis to a franchise best 2 games.

==== Week 7: at Denver Broncos ====
Week Seven: Houston Texans at Denver Broncos – Game summary

Quarter	1	2	3	4	Total
Texans	6	0	3	0	9
Broncos	0	14	7	6	27

at Sports Authority Field at Mile High, Denver, Colorado

- Date: October 24
- Game time: 7:30 p.m. CDT/6:30 p.m. MDT
- Game weather: 71 °F (22 °C), partly cloudy
- Game attendance: 76,865
- Referee: Carl Cheffers
- TV announcers (ESPN): Sean McDonough, Jon Gruden and Lisa Salters
- Recap, Gamebook

Game information

First quarter

- HOU – Nick Novak 43-yard field goal, 7:11. Texans 3–0. Drive: 7 plays, 33 yards, 2:16.
- HOU – Nick Novak 43-yard field goal, 0:21. Texans 6–0. Drive: 10 plays, 39 yards, 5:05.

Second quarter

- DEN – C. J. Anderson 7-yard run (Brandon McManus kick), 9:10. Broncos 7–6. Drive: 10 plays, 75 yards, 6:11.
- DEN – Demaryius Thomas 4-yard pass from Trevor Siemian (Brandon McManus kick), 4:04. Broncos 14–6. Drive: 7 plays, 68 yards, 3:25.

Third quarter

- HOU – Nick Novak 29-yard field goal, 9:09. Broncos 14–9. Drive: 9 plays, 72 yards, 4:50.
- DEN – Devontae Booker 1-yard run (Brandon McManus kick), 0:40. Broncos 21–9. Drive: 7 plays, 72 yards, 3:57.

Fourth quarter

- DEN – Brandon McManus 22-yard field goal, 11:36. Broncos 24–9. Drive: 7 plays, 22 yards, 3:20.
- DEN – Brandon McManus 32-yard field goal, 1:57. Broncos 27–9. Drive: 7 plays, 20 yards, 2:43.

Top passers

- HOU – Brock Osweiler – 22/41, 131 yards
- DEN – Trevor Siemian – 14/25, 157 yards, TD

Top rushers

- HOU – Alfred Blue – 11 rushes, 63 yards
- DEN – C. J. Anderson – 16 rushes, 107 yards, TD

Top receivers

- HOU – DeAndre Hopkins – 5 receptions, 36 yards
- DEN – Emmanuel Sanders – 4 receptions, 86 yards

In a MNF matchup, the Texans also faced their former head coach in Gary Kubiak. Their quarterback Brock Osweiler returned to Denver for the first time after leaving the Broncos in the offseason. But his success last week wasn't enough this week as the Broncos held the Texans to three field goals for the win. With the loss, the Texans fell to 4–3.

==== Week 8: vs. Detroit Lions ====
Week Eight: Detroit Lions at Houston Texans – Game summary

Quarter	1	2	3	4	Total
Lions	0	3	0	10	13
Texans	0	14	3	3	20

at NRG Stadium, Houston, Texas

- Date: October 30
- Game time: 12:00 p.m. CDT
- Game weather: Played indoors (retractable roof stadium, roof closed)
- Game attendance: 71,882
- Referee: Brad Allen
- TV announcers (Fox): Chris Myers, Ronde Barber and Jennifer Hale
- Recap, Gamebook

Game information

First quarter

- No scoring plays

Second quarter

- HOU – C. J. Fiedorowicz 6-yard pass from Brock Osweiler (Nick Novak kick), 12:56. Texans 7–0. Drive: 12 plays, 61 yards, 5:54.
- HOU – Lamar Miller 1-yard run (Nick Novak kick), 7:04. Texans 14–0. Drive: 10 plays, 53 yards, 4:34.
- DET – Matt Prater 47-yard field goal, 0:06. Texans 14–3. Drive: 5 plays, 52 yards, 0:30.

Third quarter

- HOU – Nick Novak 33-yard field goal, 5:51. Texans 17–3. Drive: 9 plays, 46 yards, 4:30.

Fourth quarter

- DET – Theo Riddick 1-yard pass from Matthew Stafford (Matt Prater kick), 14:50. Texans 17–10. Drive: 13 plays, 75 yards, 6:01.
- HOU – Nick Novak 36-yard field goal, 4:09. Texans 20–10. Drive: 9 plays, 47 yards, 6:05.
- DET – Matt Prater 34-yard field goal, 2:53. Texans 20–13. Drive: 6 plays, 39 yards, 1:16.

Top passers

- DET – Matthew Stafford – 27/41, 240 yards, TD
- HOU – Brock Osweiler – 20/29, 186 yards, TD, INT

Top rushers

- DET – Theo Riddick – 11 rushes, 56 yards
- HOU – Lamar Miller – 17 rushes, 56 yards, TD

Top receivers

- DET – Eric Ebron – 7 receptions, 79 yards
- HOU – DeAndre Hopkins – 4 receptions, 44 yards

The Texans rebounded from their dismal Monday Night performance and never trailed in their first matchup against the Detroit Lions since Houston's Thanksgiving 2012 win in OT. With the win, the Texans entered the Week 9 bye at 5–3.

==== Week 10: at Jacksonville Jaguars ====
Week Ten: Houston Texans at Jacksonville Jaguars – Game summary

Quarter	1	2	3	4	Total
Texans	14	0	7	3	24
Jaguars	7	3	0	11	21

at EverBank Field, Jacksonville, Florida

- Date: November 13
- Game time: 1:00 p.m. EST/12:00 p.m. CST
- Game weather: 69 °F (21 °C), sunny
- Game attendance: 62,091
- Referee: Ronald Torbert
- TV announcers (CBS): Kevin Harlan and Rich Gannon
- Recap, Gamebook

Game information

First quarter

- HOU – Kareem Jackson 42-yard interception return (Nick Novak kick), 11:57. Texans 7–0.
- JAX – Julius Thomas 5-yard pass from Blake Bortles (Jason Myers kick), 5:14. Tied 7–7. Drive: 13 plays, 75 yards, 6:43.
- HOU – Ryan Griffin 1-yard pass from Brock Osweiler (Nick Novak kick), 0:19. Texans 14–7. Drive: 10 plays, 75 yards, 4:55.

Second quarter

- JAX – Jason Myers 54-yard field goal, 5:17. Texans 14–10. Drive: 8 plays, 25 yards, 3:43.

Third quarter

- HOU – Stephen Anderson 7-yard pass from Brock Osweiler (Nick Novak kick), 4:07. Texans 21–10. Drive: 1 play, 7 yards, 0:05.

Fourth quarter

- JAX – Jason Myers 44-yard field goal, 14:56. Texans 21–13. Drive: 8 plays, 53 yards, 4:11.
- HOU – Nick Novak 51-yard field goal, 8:32. Texans 24–13. Drive: 11 plays, 42 yards, 6:24.
- JAX – Allen Robinson 14-yard pass from Blake Bortles (Blake Bortles–Allen Robinson pass), 2:17. Texans 24–21. Drive: 8 plays, 92 yards, 1:25.

Top passers

- HOU – Brock Osweiler – 14/27, 99 yards, 2 TD
- JAX – Blake Bortles – 32/49, 265 yards, 2 TD, INT

Top rushers

- HOU – Lamar Miller – 15 rushes, 83 yards
- JAX – T. J. Yeldon – 9 rushes, 32 yards

Top receivers

- HOU – DeAndre Hopkins – 5 receptions, 48 yards
- JAX – Allen Robinson – 9 receptions, 107 yards, TD

The Texans got their first road win of the season and their first winning streak since Weeks 1–2, improving to 6–3.

==== Week 11: at Oakland Raiders ====
NFL International Series

Week Eleven: Houston Texans at Oakland Raiders – Game summary

Quarter	1	2	3	4	Total
Texans	3	7	7	3	20
Raiders	0	10	3	14	27

at Estadio Azteca, Mexico City, Mexico

- Date: November 21
- Game time: 7:30 p.m. CST
- Game weather: 63 °F (17 °C), clear
- Game attendance: 76,473
- Referee: Tony Corrente
- TV announcers (ESPN): Sean McDonough, Jon Gruden and Lisa Salters
- Recap, Gamebook

Game information

First quarter

- HOU – Nick Novak 32-yard field goal, 8:34. Texans 3–0. Drive: 13 plays, 61 yards, 6:26.

Second quarter

- OAK – Jalen Richard 17-yard pass from Derek Carr (Sebastian Janikowski kick), 14:54. Raiders 7–3. Drive: 8 plays, 79 yards, 4:35.
- OAK – Sebastian Janikowski 19-yard field goal, 12:48. Raiders 10–3. Drive: 5 plays, 18 yards, 2:06.
- HOU – Braxton Miller 12-yard pass from Brock Osweiler (Nick Novak kick), 7:59. Tied 10–10. Drive: 9 plays, 75 yards, 4:49.

Third quarter

- HOU – Lamar Miller 1-yard run (Nick Novak kick), 8:32. Texans 17–10. Drive: 13 plays, 65 yards, 6:19.
- OAK – Sebastian Janikowski 20-yard field goal, 2:39. Texans 17–13. Drive: 12 plays, 73 yards, 5:53.

Fourth quarter

- HOU – Nick Novak 28-yard field goal, 10:57. Texans 20–13. Drive: 12 plays, 64 yards, 6:42.
- OAK – Jamize Olawale 75-yard pass from Derek Carr (Sebastian Janikowski kick), 10:44. Tied 20–20. Drive: 1 play, 75 yards, 0:13.
- OAK – Amari Cooper 35-yard pass from Derek Carr (Sebastian Janikowski kick), 4:43. Raiders 27–20. Drive: 5 plays, 85 yards, 1:32.

Top passers

- HOU – Brock Osweiler – 26/39, 243 yards, TD, INT
- OAK – Derek Carr – 21/31, 295 yards, 3 TD, INT

Top rushers

- HOU – Lamar Miller – 24 rushes, 104 yards, TD
- OAK – Latavius Murray – 12 rushes, 33 yards

Top receivers

- HOU – C. J. Fiedorowicz – 6 receptions, 82 yards
- OAK – Jamize Olawale – 3 receptions, 90 yards, TD

Following their first road win of the season the previous week, the Texans traveled to Mexico City to face the Oakland Raiders in what would be a controversial game. Houston received the opening kickoff and Brock Osweiler found DeAndre Hopkins for a 60-yard touchdown pass and run, but Hopkins was ruled out of bounds after gaining 24 yards. The instant replay showed that Hopkins stayed in bounds, but the play could not be challenged due to an NFL rule that says a play where a player is ruled out of bounds cannot be challenged. After the officiating error, the Texans' opening drive ended in a 32-yard field goal from Nick Novak. In the 4th quarter, with the game tied 20–20, the Texans made it to the Raiders' 16-yard line. On 3rd and 2, Lamar Miller ran the ball and appeared to have gained the 1st down, but was ruled just short. On 4th and inches, Houston decided to go for it and handed the ball off to Akeem Hunt. Hunt also appeared to have gained the 1st down, but was ruled short. The play was challenged, but the call was upheld. The spot of the ball on both plays was heavily criticized as both Miller and Hunt appeared to have gained enough yards for a 1st down. On the ensuing drive, Oakland would score the game-winning touchdown with a 35-yard pass from Derek Carr to Amari Cooper.

Along the controversial officiating, a fan in the stands shined a laser pointer in the eyes of Osweiler and Miller throughout the game.

==== Week 12: vs. San Diego Chargers ====
Week Twelve: San Diego Chargers at Houston Texans – Game summary

Quarter	1	2	3	4	Total
Chargers	0	14	0	7	21
Texans	0	7	0	6	13

at NRG Stadium, Houston, Texas

- Date: November 27
- Game time: 12:00 p.m. CST
- Game weather: Played indoors (retractable roof stadium, roof closed)
- Game attendance: 71,897
- Referee: Jeff Triplette
- TV announcers (CBS): Kevin Harlan and Rich Gannon
- Recap, Gamebook

Game information

First quarter

- No scoring plays

Second quarter

- HOU – Brock Osweiler 1-yard run (Nick Novak kick), 11:11. Texans 7–0. Drive: 10 plays, 72 yards, 5:16.
- SD – Dontrelle Inman 52-yard pass from Philip Rivers (Josh Lambo kick), 6:44. Tied 7–7. Drive: 6 plays, 74 yards, 4:27.
- SD – Tyrell Williams 21-yard pass from Philip Rivers (Josh Lambo kick), 1:54. Chargers 14–7. Drive: 5 plays, 63 yards, 2:53.

Third quarter

- No scoring plays

Fourth quarter

- HOU – Nick Novak 19-yard field goal, 14:09. Chargers 14–10. Drive: 9 plays, 36 yards, 5:28.
- SD – Hunter Henry 12-yard pass from Philip Rivers (Josh Lambo kick), 9:52. Chargers 21–10. Drive: 7 plays, 75 yards, 4:17.
- HOU – Nick Novak 45-yard field goal, 0:14. Chargers 21–13. Drive: 9 plays, 60 yards, 2:03.

Top passers

- SD – Philip Rivers – 22/30, 242 yards, 3 TD, INT
- HOU – Brock Osweiler – 22/37, 246 yards, 3 INT

Top rushers

- SD – Melvin Gordon – 17 rushes, 70 yards
- HOU – Lamar Miller – 19 rushes, 57 yards

Top receivers

- SD – Dontrelle Inman – 6 receptions, 119 yards, TD
- HOU – DeAndre Hopkins – 5 receptions, 70 yards

The Texans fell to the Chargers 21–13, losing their first and only home game of the season and dropping to 6–5.

==== Week 13: at Green Bay Packers ====
Week Thirteen: Houston Texans at Green Bay Packers – Game summary

Quarter	1	2	3	4	Total
Texans	0	0	7	6	13
Packers	0	7	0	14	21

at Lambeau Field, Green Bay, Wisconsin

- Date: December 4
- Game time: 12:00 p.m. CST
- Game weather: 32 °F (0 °C), snow
- Game attendance: 77,867
- Referee: Gene Steratore
- TV announcers (CBS): Jim Nantz, Phil Simms and Tracy Wolfson
- Recap, Gamebook

Game information

First quarter

- No scoring plays

Second quarter

- GB – Randall Cobb 9-yard pass from Aaron Rodgers (Mason Crosby kick), 8:10. Packers 7–0. Drive: 10 plays, 50 yards, 5:58.

Third quarter

- HOU – Ryan Griffin 6-yard pass from Brock Osweiler (Nick Novak kick), 7:32. Tied 7–7. Drive: 10 plays, 63 yars, 4:57.

Fourth quarter

- GB – Jordy Nelson 32-yard pass from Aaron Rodgers (Mason Crosby kick), 12:42. Packers 14–7. Drive: 12 plays, 98 yards, 5:20.
- GB – Aaron Ripkowski 3-yard run (Mason Crosby kick), 4:11. Packers 21–7. Drive: 8 plays, 89 yards, 4:41.
- HOU – DeAndre Hopkins 44-yard pass from Brock Osweiler (kick failed, wide right), 1:51. Packers 21–13. Drive: 6 plays, 78 yards, 2:20.

Top passers

- HOU – Brock Osweiler – 21/34, 213 yards, 2 TD
- GB – Aaron Rodgers – 20/30, 209 yards, 2 TD

Top rushers

- HOU – Jonathan Grimes – 5 rushes, 43 yards
- GB – Ty Montgomery – 6 rushes, 40 yards

Top receivers

- HOU – DeAndre Hopkins – 2 receptions, 55 yards, TD
- GB – Jordy Nelson – 8 receptions, 118 yards, TD

Houston lost for the first time in Green Bay, falling to .500 and 6–6.

==== Week 14: at Indianapolis Colts ====
Week Fourteen: Houston Texans at Indianapolis Colts – Game summary

Quarter	1	2	3	4	Total
Texans	3	10	3	6	22
Colts	3	0	7	7	17

at Lucas Oil Stadium, Indianapolis, Indiana

- Date: December 11
- Game time: 1:00 p.m. EST/12:00 p.m. CST
- Game weather: Played indoors (retractable roof closed)
- Game attendance: 65,250
- Referee: Brad Allen
- TV announcers (CBS): Kevin Harlan and Rich Gannon
- Recap, Gamebook

Game information

First quarter

- IND – Adam Vinatieri 32-yard field goal, 8:35. Colts 3–0. Drive: 10 plays, 74 yards, 3:50.
- HOU – Nick Novak 21-yard field goal, 4:04. Tied 3–3. Drive: 6 plays, 13 yards, 2:01.

Second quarter

- HOU – Lamar Miller 2-yard run (Nick Novak kick), 2:26. Texans 10–3. Drive: 12 plays, 80 yards, 7:19.
- HOU – Nick Novak 52-yard field goal, 0:12. Texans 13–3. Drive: 5 plays, 22 yards, 0:29.

Third quarter

- HOU – Nick Novak 24-yard field goal, 12:46. Texans 16–3. Drive: 5 plays, 12 yards, 1:08.
- IND – Frank Gore 18-yard pass from Andrew Luck (Adam Vinatieri kick), 9:53. Texans 16–10. Drive: 6 plays, 75 yards, 2:53.

Fourth quarter

- HOU – Nick Novak 41-yard field goal, 11:53. Texans 19–10. Drive: 11 plays, 64 yards, 4:51.
- IND – T. Y. Hilton 35-yard pass from Andrew Luck (Adam Vinatieri kick), 9:06. Texans 19–17. Drive: 8 plays, 83 yards, 2:47.
- HOU – Nick Novak 34-yard field goal, 2:51. Texans 22–17. Drive: 11 plays, 58 yards, 6:15.

Top passers

- HOU – Brock Osweiler – 14/24, 147 yards, INT
- IND – Andrew Luck – 24/45, 276 yards, 2 TD, 2 INT

Top rushers

- HOU – Lamar Miller – 21 rushes, 107 yards, TD
- IND – Frank Gore – 10 rushes, 41 yards

Top receivers

- HOU – DeAndre Hopkins – 2 receptions, 33 yards
- IND – T. Y. Hilton – 9 receptions, 115 yards, TD

With the win, the Texans moved up to 7–6 and swept the Colts for the first time in franchise history. They also snapped their three-game losing streak.

==== Week 15: vs. Jacksonville Jaguars ====
Week Fifteen: Jacksonville Jaguars at Houston Texans – Game summary

Quarter	1	2	3	4	Total
Jaguars	0	13	7	0	20
Texans	0	5	6	10	21

at NRG Stadium, Houston, Texas

- Date: December 18
- Game time: 12:00 p.m. CST
- Game weather: Played indoors (retractable roof closed)
- Game attendance: 71,803
- Referee: Ed Hochuli
- TV announcers (CBS): Andrew Catalon, Steve Beuerlein and Steve Tasker
- Recap, Gamebook

Game information

First quarter

- No scoring plays

Second quarter

- JAX – Jason Myers 26–yard field goal, 14:10. Jaguars 3–0. Drive: 11 plays, 56 yards, 5:36.
- JAX – Jason Myers 50–yard field goal, 11:12. Jaguars 6–0. Drive: 4 plays, −7 yards, 1:38.
- JAX – Blake Bortles 1–yard rush (Jason Myers kick), 8:39. Jaguars 13–0. Drive: 4 plays, 37 yards, 1:30.
- HOU – Penalty on Neal Sterling enforced in the end zone for a safety, 1:49. Jaguars 13–2. Drive: 3 plays, −1 yard, 1:01.
- HOU – Nick Novak 39–yard field goal, 0:53. Jaguars 13–5. Drive: 6 plays, 40 yards, 0:46.

Third quarter

- HOU – Nick Novak 45–yard field goal, 7:07. Jaguars 13–8. Drive: 9 plays, 57 yards, 5:14.
- JAX – Marqise Lee 100–yard kick return (Jason Myers kick), 7:02. Jaguars 20–8.
- HOU – Nick Novak 43–yard field goal, 0:15. Jaguars 20–11. Drive: 9 plays, 45 yards, 3:15.

Fourth quarter

- HOU – Nick Novak 27–yard field goal, 7:57. Jaguars 20–14. Drive: 14 plays, 58 yards, 6:05.
- HOU – Lamar Miller 1–yard run (Nick Novak kick), 2:52. Texans 21–20. Drive: 8 plays, 52 yards, 2:56.

Top passers

- JAX – Blake Bortles – 12/28, 92 yards, INT
- HOU – Tom Savage – 23/36, 260 yards

Top rushers

- JAX – Chris Ivory – 10 rushes, 44 yards
- HOU – Lamar Miller – 22 rushes, 63 yards, TD

Top receivers

- JAX – T. J. Yeldon – 5 receptions, 34 yards
- HOU – DeAndre Hopkins – 8 receptions, 87 yards

The Texans were down 13–5 at halftime and had a deficit as large as 20–8, but ultimately rallied to win 21–20. With the comeback win, the Texans improved to 8–6 and extended their divisional winning streak to 10 games, and six straight against Jacksonville.

===== Notes =====
Quarterback Brock Osweiler was pulled from the game and benched in favor of Tom Savage during the second quarter. Osweiler went 6/11 for 48 yards and threw two back-to-back interceptions before being pulled from the game in the middle of the second quarter.

==== Week 16: vs. Cincinnati Bengals ====
Week Sixteen: Cincinnati Bengals at Houston Texans – Game summary

Quarter	1	2	3	4	Total
Bengals	0	3	0	7	10
Texans	0	0	3	9	12

at NRG Stadium, Houston, Texas

- Date: December 24
- Game time: 7:25 p.m. CST
- Game weather: Played indoors (retractable roof closed)
- Game attendance: 71,836
- Referee: Carl Cheffers
- TV announcers (NFLN): Kevin Harlan, Rich Gannon and Stacey Dales
- Recap, Gamebook

Game information

First quarter

- No scoring plays

Second quarter

- CIN – Randy Bullock 43-yard field goal, 0:00. Bengals 3–0. Drive: 14 plays, 67 yards, 4:58.

Third quarter

- HOU – Nick Novak 25-yard field goal, 9:05. Tied 3–3. Drive: 11 plays, 68 yards, 5:55.

Fourth quarter

- HOU – Nick Novak 22-yard field goal, 13:31. Texans 6–3. Drive: 12 plays, 71 yards, 6:34.
- CIN – Brandon LaFell 86–yard pass from Andy Dalton (Randy Bullock kick), 10:45. Bengals 10–6. Drive: 3 plays, 91 yards, 0:55.
- HOU – Alfred Blue 24-yard run (kick blocked), 8:41. Texans 12–10. Drive: 4 plays, 75 yards, 2:04.

Top passers

- CIN – Andy Dalton – 28/41, 268 yards, TD, INT
- HOU – Tom Savage – 18/29, 176 yards

Top rushers

- CIN – Rex Burkhead – 12 rushes, 42 yards
- HOU – Alfred Blue – 21 rushes, 73 yards, TD

Top receivers

- CIN – Brandon LaFell – 6 receptions, 130 yards, TD
- HOU – DeAndre Hopkins – 3 receptions, 43 yards

Quarterback Tom Savage got his first career NFL start against the Cincinnati Bengals. Savage struggled in the first half against the Bengals' stout defense, being sacked on two back-to-back plays in the first quarter for a huge loss. The first score of the game came on a last second 43-yard field goal from Randy Bullock to put Cincinnati up 3–0 going into halftime. The Texans responded on their first possession in the second half with a 25-yard field goal from Nick Novak to tie the game at 3–3. The Bengals punted the ball on their next possession. Receiving the ball back, another drive stalled for the Texans as they had to settle for a 22-yard field goal from Novak to take a 6–3 lead. Cincinnati tried to respond to the Houston field goal, but a tipped pass from Andy Dalton was intercepted by Quentin Demps. The Texans came up short on the interception and were forced to punt the ball back. After receiving the kick, the Bengals quickly struck with Dalton finding Brandon LaFell for an 86-yard touchdown pass. With Bullock making the extra point the Bengals took a 10–6 lead with 10:45 left to play. Houston responded on their next drive with a 24-yard touchdown run from Alfred Blue, but Novak's extra point was blocked. After both teams traded punts, the Bengals marched down to the Houston 25-yard line to try the game-winning field goal. Cincinnati kicker Randy Bullock, who had been released by the Texans the previous season, tried for the game-winning field goal, but it went wide right.

With the win and the Tennessee Titans losing earlier in the day, the Texans won their second straight AFC South title.

==== Week 17: at Tennessee Titans ====
Week Seventeen: Houston Texans at Tennessee Titans – Game summary

Quarter	1	2	3	4	Total
Texans	0	0	10	7	17
Titans	7	7	7	3	24

at Nissan Stadium, Nashville, Tennessee

- Date: January 1, 2017
- Game time: 12:00 p.m. CST
- Game weather: 52 °F (11 °C), cloudy
- Game attendance: 65,205
- Referee: Bill Vinovich
- TV announcers (CBS): Tom McCarthy and Adam Archuleta
- Recap, Gamebook

Game information

First quarter

- TEN – DaQuan Jones fumble recovery in the end zone (Ryan Succop kick), 9:57. Titans 7–0.

Second quarter

- TEN – Rishard Matthews 2-yard pass from Matt Cassel (Ryan Succop kick), 0:23. Titans 14–0. Drive: 7 plays, 36 yards, 2:08.

Third quarter

- HOU – C. J. Fiedorowicz 4-yard pass from Brock Osweiler (Nick Novak kick), 10:31. Titans 14–7. Drive: 13 plays, 81 yards, 4:29.
- TEN – Derrick Henry 2-yard run (Ryan Succop kick), 4:44. Titans 21–7. Drive: 10 plays, 55 yards, 5:47.
- HOU – Nick Novak 26-yard field goal, 1:15. Titans 21–10. Drive: 8 plays, 67 yards, 3:33.

Fourth quarter

- TEN – Ryan Succop 35-yard field goal, 8:34. Titans 24–10. Drive: 13 plays, 57 yards, 7:41.
- HOU – Brock Osweiler 1-yard run (Nick Novak kick), 3:11. Titans 24–17. Drive: 14 plays, 75 yards, 5:19.

Top passers

- HOU – Brock Osweiler – 21/40, 253 yards, TD
- TEN – Matt Cassel – 16/26, 150 yards, TD, INT

Top rushers

- HOU – Alfred Blue – 11 rushes, 28 yards
- TEN – Derrick Henry – 15 rushes, 65 yards, TD

Top receivers

- HOU – DeAndre Hopkins – 7 receptions, 123 yards
- TEN – Rishard Matthews – 9 receptions, 114 yards, TD

Tom Savage started at quarterback for the Texans, but was pulled from the game in the 1st quarter due to a possible concussion. After Savage was pulled, Brock Osweiler, who had been benched 2 weeks prior, came in as quarterback.

With the loss, the Texans finished the regular season at 9–7 for the third straight year. Their ten-game winning streak against divisional opponents was snapped, as well as their five-game winning streak against the Titans.

=== Postseason ===
==== AFC Wild Card Playoffs: vs. (5) Oakland Raiders ====
AFC Wild Card Playoffs: (5) Oakland Raiders at (4) Houston Texans – Game summary

Quarter	1	2	3	4	Total
Raiders	7	0	0	7	14
Texans	10	10	0	7	27

at NRG Stadium, Houston, Texas

- Date: January 7, 2017
- Game time: 3:35 p.m. CST
- Game weather: Played indoors (retractable roof closed)
- Game attendance: 71,790
- Referee: Ronald Torbert
- TV announcers (ESPN/ABC): Sean McDonough, Jon Gruden, Lisa Salters and Adam Schefter
- Recap, Gamebook

Game information

First quarter

- HOU – Nick Novak 50-yard field goal, 8:04. Texans 3–0. Drive: 4 plays, 8 yards, 1:45.
- HOU – Lamar Miller 5-yard run (Nick Novak kick), 6:16. Texans 10–0. Drive: 1 play, 5 yards, 0:02.
- OAK – Latavius Murray 2-yard run (Sebastian Janikowski kick), 1:01. Texans 10–7. Drive: 5 plays, 38 yards, 1:55.

Second quarter

- HOU – Nick Novak 38-yard field goal, 8:48. Texans 13–7. Drive: 9 plays, 75 yards, 4:17.
- HOU – DeAndre Hopkins 2-yard pass from Brock Osweiler (Nick Novak kick), 1:20. Texans 20–7. Drive: 4 plays, 60 yards, 1:05.

Third quarter

- No scoring plays

Fourth quarter

- HOU – Brock Osweiler 1-yard run (Nick Novak kick), 12:28. Texans 27–7. Drive: 7 plays, 53 yards, 2:49.
- OAK – Andre Holmes 8-yard pass from Connor Cook (Sebastian Janikowski kick), 8:10. Texans 27–14. Drive: 11 plays, 75 yards, 4:18.

Top passers

- OAK – Connor Cook – 18/45, 161 yards, TD, 3 INT
- HOU – Brock Osweiler – 14/25, 168 yards, TD

Top rushers

- OAK – Latavius Murray – 12 rushes, 39 yards, TD
- HOU – Lamar Miller – 31 rushes, 73 yards, TD

Top receivers

- OAK – Andre Holmes – 4 receptions, 50 yards, TD
- HOU – DeAndre Hopkins – 5 receptions, 67 yards, TD

In a rematch of a controversial game from week 11, the Houston Texans hosted the Oakland Raiders for the first playoff game of the 2016 season.

Brock Osweiler started as the Texans' quarterback with Tom Savage still out due to concussion protocol. On the other side of the field, Oakland Raiders quarterback Connor Cook started his first-ever NFL game, which also happened to be in the postseason, becoming the first rookie in NFL history since the inception of the Super Bowl to do so. With eight minutes remaining in the first quarter, the Texans drew first blood with a 50-yard Nick Novak field goal, and a handoff from Texans QB Brock Osweiler to Lamar Miller touchdown and Novak PAT soon made the game 10–0. A 37-yard punt return on a 51-yard punt from Shane Lechler by Jalen Richard gave the Raiders good field position for a Latavius Murray rushing touchdown to bring the Raiders back into the game at 10–7 after a Sebastian Janikowski PAT. The Texans and then the Raiders exchanged three-and-outs, setting the scene for a coffin corner punt by Marquette King that pinned the Texans at their own five-yard line. However, the Texans recovered and scored again on a narrowly good Novak 38-yard field goal. A subsequent DeAndre Hopkins touchdown reception further widened their lead to 20–7 at the half. Neither team was able to put anything on the scoreboard in the third quarter. However, with 12:28 left to go in the fourth quarter, Brock Osweiler went untouched for a 1-yard rushing touchdown, making the score 27–7. The Raiders rallied back with an 8-yard touchdown pass from Cook to Andre Holmes, but that would be the last score of the game as Connor Cook's next drive was abruptly halted after a tipped-ball interception by Texans cornerback A. J. Bouye sealed the Raiders' fate. The final score was 27–14 to the Texans.

==== AFC Divisional Playoffs: at (1) New England Patriots ====
AFC Divisional Playoffs: (4) Houston Texans at (1) New England Patriots – Game summary

Quarter	1	2	3	4	Total
Texans	3	10	0	3	16
Patriots	14	3	7	10	34

at Gillette Stadium, Foxborough, Massachusetts

- Date: January 14, 2017
- Game time: 8:15 p.m. EST/7:15 p.m. CST
- Game weather: 28 °F (−2 °C), cloudy and cold
- Game attendance: 66,829
- Referee: Pete Morelli
- TV announcers (CBS): Jim Nantz, Phil Simms and Tracy Wolfson
- Recap, Gamebook

Game information

First quarter

- NE – Dion Lewis 13-yard pass from Tom Brady (Stephen Gostkowski kick), 9:27. Patriots 7–0. Drive: 2 plays, 65 yards, 0:43.
- HOU – Nick Novak 33-yard field goal, 1:15. Patriots 7–3. Drive: 14 plays, 62 yards, 8:12.
- NE – Dion Lewis 98-yard kick return (Stephen Gostkowski kick), 1:00. Patriots 14–3.

Second quarter

- HOU – Nick Novak 27-yard field goal, 11:39. Patriots 14–6. Drive: 6 plays, 18 yards, 2:45.
- HOU – C. J. Fiedorowicz 10-yard pass from Brock Osweiler, 10:49. Patriots 14–13. Drive: 2 plays, 12 yards, 0:40.
- NE – Stephen Gostkowski 19-yard field goal, 0:07. Patriots 17–13. Drive: 10 plays, 66 yards, 3:47.

Third quarter

- NE – James White 19-yard pass from Tom Brady (Stephen Gostkowski kick), 9:09. Patriots 24–13. Drive: 9 plays, 90 yards, 3:21.

Fourth quarter

- HOU – Nick Novak 44-yard field goal, 14:51. Patriots 24–16. Drive: 4 plays, 6 yards, 0:50.
- NE – Dion Lewis 1-yard run (Stephen Gostkowski kick), 12:16. Patriots 31–16. Drive: 1 play, 5 yards, 0:28.
- NE – Stephen Gostkowski 42-yard field goal, 6:37. Patriots 34–16. Drive: 10 plays, 43 yards, 3:45.

Top passers

- HOU – Brock Osweiler – 23/40, 198 yards, TD, 3 INT
- NE – Tom Brady – 18/38, 287 yards, 2 TD, 2 INT

Top rushers

- HOU – Lamar Miller – 19 rushes, 73 yards
- NE – Dion Lewis – 13 rushes, 41 yards, TD

Top receivers

- HOU – DeAndre Hopkins – 6 receptions, 65 yards
- NE – Julian Edelman – 8 receptions, 137 yards

With this loss, the Texans become the latest victim of the Super Bowl home field curse, as no host team had ever played the championship game on its own home field (with the previous week's victory, they had already become only the third Super Bowl host team - and the first other than the Miami Dolphins - to win a playoff game). They finish with an overall record of 10–8.

== Standings ==
=== Division ===
AFC South
	W	L	T	PCT	DIV	CONF	PF	PA	STK
^{(4)} Houston Texans	9	7	0	.563	5–1	7–5	279	328	L1
Tennessee Titans	9	7	0	.563	2–4	6–6	381	378	W1
Indianapolis Colts	8	8	0	.500	3–3	5–7	411	392	W1
Jacksonville Jaguars	3	13	0	.188	2–4	2–10	318	400	L1

=== Conference ===
AFC
#	Team	Division	W	L	T	PCT	DIV	CONF	SOS	SOV	STK
Division leaders
1	New England Patriots	East	14	2	0	.875	5–1	11–1	.439	.424	W7
2 (Note: Kansas City clinched the AFC West division over Oakland based on head-to-head sweep.)	Kansas City Chiefs	West	12	4	0	.750	6–0	9–3	.508	.479	W2
3	Pittsburgh Steelers	North	11	5	0	.688	5–1	9–3	.494	.423	W7
4 (Note: Houston clinched the AFC South division title over Tennessee based on record vs. division opponents.)	Houston Texans	South	9	7	0	.563	5–1	7–5	.502	.427	L1
Wild Cards
5	Oakland Raiders	West	12	4	0	.750	3–3	9–3	.504	.443	L1
6	Miami Dolphins	East	10	6	0	.625	4–2	7–5	.455	.341	L1
Did not qualify for the postseason
7 (Note: Tennessee finished ahead of Denver based on head-to-head victory.)	Tennessee Titans	South	9	7	0	.563	2–4	6–6	.465	.458	W1
8	Denver Broncos	West	9	7	0	.563	2–4	6–6	.549	.455	W1
9 (Note: Baltimore finished ahead of Indianapolis based on record vs. conference opponents.)	Baltimore Ravens	North	8	8	0	.500	4–2	7–5	.498	.363	L2
10	Indianapolis Colts	South	8	8	0	.500	3–3	5–7	.492	.406	W1
11	Buffalo Bills	East	7	9	0	.438	1–5	4–8	.482	.339	L2
12	Cincinnati Bengals	North	6	9	1	.406	3–3	5–7	.521	.333	W1
13 (Note: The New York Jets finished ahead of San Diego based record vs. common opponents — the Jets' cumulative record against Cleveland, Indianapolis, Kansas City and Miami was 1–4, while San Diego's cumulative record against the same four teams was 0–5.)	New York Jets	East	5	11	0	.313	2–4	4–8	.518	.313	W1
14	San Diego Chargers	West	5	11	0	.313	1–5	4–8	.543	.513	L5
15	Jacksonville Jaguars	South	3	13	0	.188	2–4	2–10	.527	.417	L1
16	Cleveland Browns	North	1	15	0	.063	0–6	1–11	.549	.313	L1
Tiebreakers (Note: When breaking ties for three or more teams under the NFL's rules, they are first broken within divisions, then comparing only the highest ranked remaining team from each division.)

== Statistics ==
=== Team ===
Category	Total yards	Yards per game	NFL rank (out of 32)
Passing offense	3,176	198.5	29th
Rushing offense	1,859	116.2	8th
Total offense	5,035	314.7	29th
Passing defense	3,226	201.6	2nd
Rushing defense	1,595	99.7	12th
Total defense	4,821	301.3	1st

=== Individual ===
Category	Player	Total
Offense
Passing yards	Brock Osweiler	2,957
Passing touchdowns	Brock Osweiler	15
Rushing yards	Lamar Miller	1,073
Rushing touchdowns	Lamar Miller	6
Receiving yards	DeAndre Hopkins	954
Receiving touchdowns	DeAndre Hopkins; C. J. Fiedorowicz	4
Defense
Tackles (Solo)	Benardrick McKinney	79
Sacks	Whitney Mercilus	7.5
Interceptions	Quintin Demps	6
