= Killian (disambiguation) =

Killian is a given name and surname of Irish origin.

Killian could also refer to:

== Places ==
- Killian, a barony in County Galway, Ireland, encompassing several townlands;
- Killian, Louisiana, a village in Livingston Parish
- Kilian Island (also known as Elvira Island), an uninhabited island in the Qikiqtaaluk Region, Nunavut, Canada
- Kilianstein, a rock formation in Germany
- Miami Killian High School, a public high school located in unincorporated Miami-Dade County, Florida
  - The Killian Nine, a group of students at Miami Killian High School who in February 1999 distributed a controversial satirical pamphlet named "First Amendment" and were arrested for it
- St Kilian's German School (also known as 'St Kilian's Deutsche Schule'), a school situated in Clonskeagh, Dublin, Ireland
- St Killian's College at Carnlough, Northern Ireland

== Fictional characters ==
- Jack Kilian, lead character in the television series Midnight Caller (1988–1991)
- Killian Gardiner, one of the main characters of Witches of East End
- Captain Killian "Hook" Jones, a fictional character on the television series Once Upon a Time
- Cassandra Cillian, a main character in The Librarians
- Damon Killian, a key supporting character in the 1987 film The Running Man
- Killian Costello, a supporting character in the 2023 comic book Nemesis: Reloaded

== Other uses ==
- Kilian family, a lineage of German engravers
- Killian's Irish Red Beer, a lager brewed by Coors
- The Killian Curse, a New Zealand kidult horror-fantasy series
- The Killian documents controversy, referring to forged documents containing allegations about George W. Bush's National Guard service that were publicized during the 2004 US presidential campaign
- Killian or Kilian, a dance hold used in ice dancing where the dancers are side-by-side.

== See also ==
- Jiří Kylián (born 1947), Czech dancer and choreographer
- Killin (disambiguation)
