= Killing =

Killing, Killings, or The Killing may refer to:

== Types of killing ==
- -cide, a suffix that refers to types of killing (see List of types of killing), such as:
  - Homicide, one human killing another

== Arts, entertainment, and media ==
=== Films ===
- Killing (film), a 2018 Japanese film
- The Killing (film), a 1956 film noir directed by Stanley Kubrick
- Encounter: The Killing, a 2002 Indian film by Ajay Phansekar

=== Television ===
- The Killing (Danish TV series), a police procedural drama first broadcast in 2007
- The Killing (American TV series), a crime drama based on the Danish television series, first broadcast in 2011

=== Literature ===
- Killing (comics), Italian photo comic series about a vicious vigilante-criminal
- Killing, a series of historical nonfiction books by Bill O'Reilly and Martin Dugard
- "Killings" (short story), a short story by Andre Dubus
- The Killing (novel), a CHERUB series installment by Robert Muchamore
- The Killing, a 2012 novelization of the Danish TV series by David Hewson

=== Music ===
- "Killing", a song on the album Echoes by The Rapture
- "Killing", a song from an untitled Korn album released in 2007
- The Killing, an EP by Hatesphere

== Mathematics ==
- Several concepts named after Wilhelm Killing:
  - Killing tensor, a generalization of a Killing vector field
  - Killing vector field or Killing field, a vector field on a Riemannian manifold
  - The Killing form, a symmetric bilinear form on a finite-dimensional Lie algebra

== People with the name ==
- Killing (surname)
- Killings (surname)
- Claus Killing-Günkel (born 1963), German interlinguist

== See also ==
- The Killers (disambiguation)
- Killin (disambiguation)
- Kill (disambiguation)
- Killed in action
- Nonkilling
- Death
