= Killin (disambiguation) =

Killin is a village by Loch Tay in Stirling council area, Scotland.

Killin may also refer to:

- Killin incident of 1749
- Killin Railway
- Killin railway station
- Killin Junction railway station
- Loch Killin, a small freshwater loch in Highland council area, some distance north of Killin on Loch Tay
- HMS Loch Killin (K391), a Loch-class frigate named after the loch

== People with the surname ==
- Roy Killin (born 1929), Canadian-born footballer
- Tom Killin (born 1950), British Paralympian

== See also ==
- Killen
- Killen (surname)
- Killian (disambiguation)
- Killing, sometimes shortened to "killin"
- Killing (surname)
