= Killen =

Killen may refer to:

== Places ==
- Killen, Alabama, U.S.
- Killen Station, a coal-fired power plant in Adams County, Ohio
- Killen, County Tyrone, Northern Ireland
- Killen, Highland, Scotland

== Other uses ==
- Killen (surname)

== See also ==
- Killin (disambiguation)
