= Lamar Miller =

American football player (born 1991)

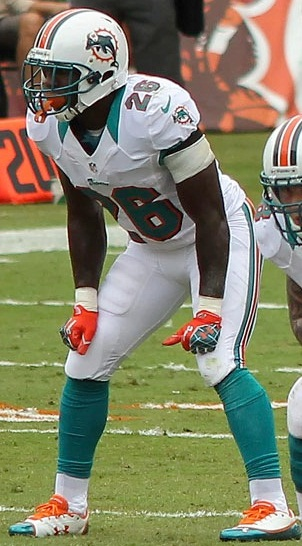
- Miller with the Miami Dolphins in 2012

No. 26, 25
- Position: Running back

Personal information
- Born: April 25, 1991 (age 35); Miami, Florida, U.S.
- Listed height: 5 ft 10 in (1.78 m)
- Listed weight: 221 lb (100 kg)

Career information
- High school: Miami Killian (Kendall, Florida)
- College: Miami (FL) (2009–2011)
- NFL draft: 2012: 4th round, 97th overall pick

Career history
- Miami Dolphins (2012–2015); Houston Texans (2016–2019); New England Patriots (2020)*; Chicago Bears (2020); Washington Football Team (2020); New Orleans Saints (2021)*
- * Offseason or practice squad member only

Awards and highlights
- Pro Bowl (2018); Second-team All-ACC (2011)

Career NFL statistics
- Rushing yards: 5,864
- Rushing average: 4.3
- Rushing touchdowns: 32
- Receptions: 211
- Receiving yards: 1,571
- Receiving touchdowns: 8
- Stats at Pro Football Reference

Lamar N. Miller (born April 25, 1991) is an American former professional football player who was a running back in the National Football League (NFL). He played college football for the Miami Hurricanes and was selected by the Miami Dolphins in the fourth round of the 2012 NFL draft. He was also a member of the Houston Texans, New England Patriots, Chicago Bears, Washington Football Team, and New Orleans Saints.

== Early life ==
Miller attended Miami Killian Senior High School in Miami, Florida. While there, he played high school football for the Cougars. As a senior, he was a Parade All-American after rushing for 1,749 yards on 217 carries with 22 touchdowns.

== College career ==
Miller decided to play for the Miami Hurricanes rather than the Florida Gators (near his mother's hometown) to stay close to home, and to follow the footsteps of other former Hurricanes running backs. He played at the University of Miami under head coaches Randy Shannon and Al Golden.

After he was redshirted in 2009, Miller saw his first game action in 2010. In his collegiate debut, he scored a rushing touchdown against Florida A&M. In the following game against Ohio State, he had an 88-yard kickoff return for a touchdown. On November 6, against Maryland, he had 22 carries for 125 yards and a rushing touchdown. Two weeks later, against Virginia Tech, he had 15 carries for 163 yards and a touchdown. He played in 11 games with one start and rushed for 646 yards on 108 carries with six touchdowns.

Miller took over as the Hurricanes starting running back in 2011. He started off the 2011 strong with five games going over 100 rushing yards, including a 184-yard day against Ohio State and 166-yard against Virginia Tech. During the 2011 season, Miller rushed for 1,272 yards and nine touchdowns. He became the first Miami running back since Willis McGahee in the 2002 season to rush for over 1,000 yards in a season.

Miller was also an All-ACC track performer at the University of Miami.

== Professional career ==
Pre-draft measurables
Height	Weight	Arm length	Hand span	40-yard dash	10-yard split	20-yard split	20-yard shuttle	Three-cone drill	Vertical jump	Broad jump
5 ft 10 3/4 in (1.80 m)	212 lb (96 kg)	31 3/8 in (0.80 m)	9 1/4 in (0.23 m)	4.40 s	1.53 s	2.50 s	4.08 s	6.94 s	35.5 in (0.90 m)	10 ft 0 in (3.05 m)
All values from NFL Combine and Central Florida Pro Day.

=== Miami Dolphins ===
==== 2012 season ====
Miller was selected by the Miami Dolphins in the fourth round of the 2012 NFL draft, 97th overall on April 28, 2012. On June 1, 2012, Miller signed a 4-year, $2.58 million contract, including a $480,000 signing bonus.

As a rookie, Miller shared the backfield with Reggie Bush and Daniel Thomas. On September 16, he made his NFL debut running for 65 yards on a season-high 10 carries and a touchdown against the Oakland Raiders. On December 23, Miller ran for a season-high 73 yards on 10 carries against the Buffalo Bills.

In the 2012 season, Miller rushed for 250 yards and a touchdown.

==== 2013 season ====
After the departure of Reggie Bush, Miller became the main running back on the team and continued to share time with Daniel Thomas. In Week 9, against the Cincinnati Bengals, Miller had 16 carries for 105 yards in the 22–20 victory. Overall, he finished the 2013 season with 177 carries for 709 rushing yards and two rushing touchdowns to go along with 26 receptions for 170 receiving yards.

==== 2014 season ====
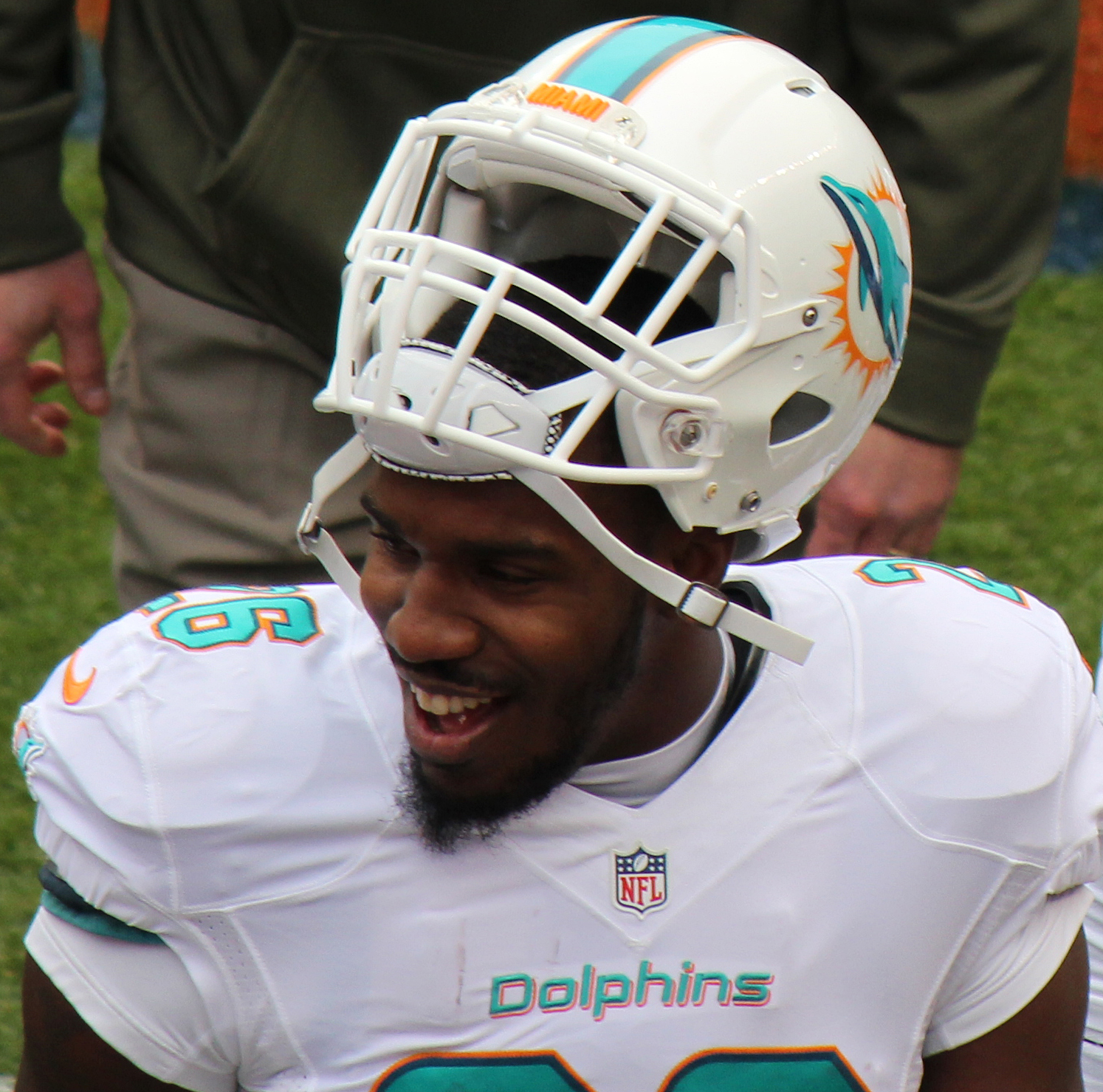
Miller with the Miami Dolphins, 2014

Coming into the 2014 season, Miller was the main running back with a backfield that consisted of him, Thomas, Damien Williams, and Knowshon Moreno. In Week 4, against the Oakland Raiders, he had his first game with two rushing touchdowns in the 38–14 victory. In the Week 17 finale, Miller had a career-high 178 rushing yards and a rushing touchdown in the 37–24 loss to the New York Jets. Miller's rushing touchdown in the game went for 97 yards, the longest rushing play in franchise history. In the 2014 season, Miller finished with 216 carries for 1,099 rushing yards and eight rushing touchdowns to go along with 38 receptions for 275 receiving yards and one receiving touchdown.

==== 2015 season ====
In Week 7, against the Houston Texans, Miller had 175 rushing yards, one rushing touchdown, 61 receiving yards, and one receiving touchdown in the 44–26 victory. In Week 9, against the Buffalo Bills, he had 141 scrimmage yards in the 33–17 loss. In Week 14, against the New York Giants, he had this third career game with two rushing touchdowns. In the 2015 season, Miller finished with 194 carries for 872 yards and eight rushing touchdowns to go along with 47 receptions for a career-high 397 yards and two receiving touchdowns.

=== Houston Texans ===
On March 9, 2016, Miller signed a four-year deal with the Houston Texans worth $26 million with $14 million guaranteed. This contract was the sixth highest among running backs.

==== 2016 season ====
In Week 6, against the Indianapolis Colts, Miller had 178 scrimmage yards, one rushing touchdown, and one receiving touchdown in the 26–23 victory. In the 2016 season, Miller rushed for 1,073 yards and five rushing touchdowns to go along with 31 receptions for 188 receiving yards and one receiving touchdown. He had four games going over the 100-rushing yards mark.

The Texans qualified for the playoffs in the 2016 season. In the Wild Card Round against the Oakland Raiders, Miller had 31 carries for 73 yards and a rushing touchdown in the 27–14 victory. In the Divisional Round against the New England Patriots, he finished with 19 carries for 74 yards and four receptions for 15 yards in the 34–16 loss.

==== 2017 season ====
In Week 4, against the Tennessee Titans, Miller had a rushing and a receiving touchdown in the 57–14 victory. In Week 8, against the Seattle Seahawks, he had another game with a rushing touchdown and a receiving touchdown. In the 2017 season, Miller finished with 238 carries for 888 rushing yards, three rushing touchdowns, 36 receptions, 327 receiving yards, and three receiving touchdowns.

==== 2018 season ====
In the season opener against the New England Patriots, Miller ran for 98 yards and caught a pass for 11 yards in the 20–27 loss. On September 23, Miller scored his first touchdown of the season, bringing in a touchdown catch on the final play of the game against the New York Giants. On October 21, Miller rushed for 100 yards and a touchdown on 22 carries against the Jacksonville Jaguars. This touchdown was his eighth touchdown on the ground as a Texan, moving past quarterback David Carr into seventh-most in franchise history. The next week, Miller rushed for 133 yards and a touchdown against the Miami Dolphins, included as well was a 58-yard run. His back-to-back 100-yard games were his first time as a Texan, the last time this was accomplished by a Texan was by Arian Foster in 2014. After this game, Foster surpassed 100 yards for the sixth time as a Texan, passing Steve Slaton, Ben Tate, and teammate Alfred Blue into third most in franchise history. After running up 86 yards against the Washington Redskins, he would follow that game with 162 yards and a touchdown against the Tennessee Titans, including a 97-yard touchdown run. His touchdown run is the longest play in franchise history, and was the longest touchdown run in the NFL since he did it in 2014, becoming the only player in NFL history with two touchdown runs over 95 yards in a career. Overall, Miller finished the 2018 season with 973 rushing yards, five rushing touchdowns, 25 receptions, 163 receiving yards, and a receiving touchdown. The Texans finished atop the AFC South and earned the #3-seed for the AFC Playoffs. In the Wild Card Round against the Indianapolis Colts, he had eight receptions for 63 yards in the 21–7 loss. He also rushed for 18 yards on five carries. Miller earned a Pro Bowl nomination for his 2018 season.

==== 2019 season ====
During the team's third preseason game against the Dallas Cowboys, Miller tore his ACL, prematurely ending his season. He was placed on injured reserve on August 26, 2019.

=== New England Patriots ===
On August 13, 2020, Miller signed with the New England Patriots. He was placed on the active/physically unable to perform list after signing. He was activated on August 31, 2020. Miller was released from the Patriots on September 5, 2020.

=== Chicago Bears ===
Miller was signed to the Chicago Bears' practice squad on October 5, 2020. The move reunited him with offensive coordinator Bill Lazor and running backs coach Charles London, whom he respectively played under in Miami and Houston, respectively. He was elevated to the active roster on November 16 for the team's Week 10 game against the Minnesota Vikings, and reverted to the practice squad after the game, in which he recorded two catches for six yards and had no rushing attempts.

=== Washington Football Team ===
On December 17, 2020, Miller was signed by the Washington Football Team off the Bears' practice squad. He re-signed with the team on March 29, 2021, and was released on August 15, 2021.

=== New Orleans Saints ===
On October 19, 2021, the New Orleans Saints signed Miller to their practice squad. He was released on November 16, 2021.

== Career statistics ==
=== NFL ===
Legend
	Led the league
**Bold**	Career high

==== Regular season ====
Regular season statistics
Year	Team	Games		Rushing					Receiving					Fumbles	
Year	Team	GP	GS	Att	Yds	Avg	Lng	TD	Rec	Yds	Avg	Lng	TD	Fum	Lost
2012	MIA	13	1	51	250	4.9	28	1	6	45	7.5	12	0	0	0
2013	MIA	**16**	15	177	709	4.0	49	2	26	170	6.5	22	0	1	1
2014	MIA	**16**	**16**	216	**1,099**	**5.1**	**97**	**8**	38	275	7.2	20	1	**2**	**2**
2015	MIA	**16**	**16**	194	872	4.5	85T	**8**	**47**	**397**	8.4	**54T**	2	1	1
2016	HOU	14	14	**268**	1,073	4.0	45	5	31	188	6.1	16	1	**2**	1
2017	HOU	**16**	13	238	888	3.7	21	3	36	327	**9.1**	32	**3**	1	0
2018	HOU	14	14	210	973	4.6	**97**	5	25	163	6.5	16	1	1	1
2019	HOU	0	0	Did not play due to injury											
2020	CHI	1	0	—	—	—	—	—	2	6	3.0	7	0	0	0
Total		106	89	1,354	5,864	4.3	97T	32	211	1,571	7.4	54T	8	9	7

==== Postseason ====
Postseason statistics
Year	Team	Games		Rushing					Receiving					Fumbles	
Year	Team	GP	GS	Att	Yds	Avg	Lng	TD	Rec	Yds	Avg	Lng	TD	Fum	Lost
2016	HOU	**2**	**2**	**50**	**147**	2.9	**19**	**1**	4	15	3.8	6	0	0	0
2018	HOU	1	1	5	18	**3.6**	8	0	**8**	**63**	**7.9**	**12**	0	0	0
2019	HOU	0	0	Did not play due to injury											
Total		3	3	55	165	3.0	19	1	12	78	6.5	12	0	0	0

=== College ===
College statistics
Season	Team	GP	Rushing				Receiving			
Season	Team	GP	Att	Yds	Avg	TD	Rec	Yds	Avg	TD
2010	Miami	11	108	646	6.0	6	11	96	8.7	0
2011	Miami	12	227	1,272	5.6	9	17	85	5.0	1
Career		23	335	1,918	5.7	15	28	181	6.5	1

== Career highlights ==
=== Awards and honors ===
- Pro Bowl (2018)
- Second-team All-ACC (2011)

=== Records ===
==== NFL records ====
- Only player in NFL history to rush for a 90+ yard touchdown with two different teams
- Only player in NFL history with two 95+ yard rushing touchdowns

==== Miami Dolphins records ====
- Longest rushing play: 97 yards

==== Houston Texans records ====
- Longest rushing play: 97 yards
