= Tony Gaiter =

American football player (born 1974)

No. 17, 85, 1
- Position: Wide receiver

Personal information
- Born: July 15, 1974 (age 52); Miami, Florida, U.S.
- Listed height: 5 ft 8 in (1.73 m)
- Listed weight: 169 lb (77 kg)

Career information
- High school: Miami Killian Senior
- College: Miami (FL)
- NFL draft: 1997: 6th round, 192nd overall pick

Career history
- New England Patriots (1997–1998); San Diego Chargers (1998); Amsterdam Admirals (2000); New England Patriots (2000)*; Orlando Rage (2001)
- * Offseason or practice squad member only

Career NFL statistics
- Return yards: 450
- Stats at Pro Football Reference

Tony Bernard Gaiter Jr. (born July 15, 1974) is an American former professional football player who was a wide receiver in the National Football League (NFL) for the New England Patriots and San Diego Chargers. He was selected in the sixth round of the 1997 NFL draft. He played college football for the Miami Hurricanes. He also played in the XFL for the Orlando Rage.

He played football at Miami Killian Senior High School.
