= Killens =

Killens is a surname. Notable people with the surname include:

- John Oliver Killens (1916–1987), American author
- Marie Thérèse Killens (born 1927), Canadian politician
- Terry Killens (born 1974), American American football player

== See also ==
- Killen (surname)
- Killens Pond State Park, Delaware
