= C. J. Fiedorowicz =

American football player (born 1991)

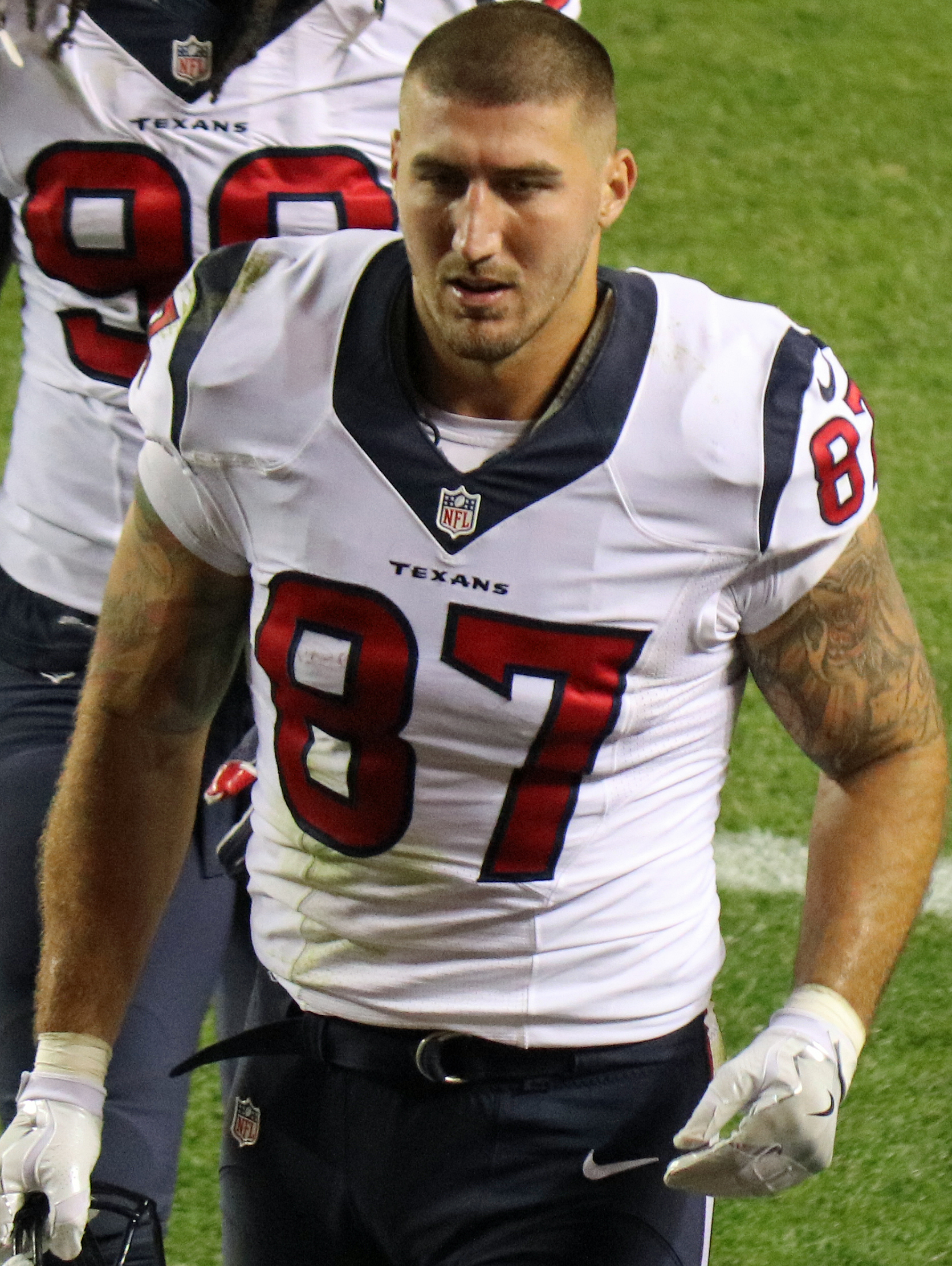
- Fiedorowicz with the Houston Texans in 2016

No. 87
- Position: Tight end

Personal information
- Born: October 22, 1991 (age 35); Johnsburg, Illinois, U.S.
- Listed height: 6 ft 5 in (1.96 m)
- Listed weight: 265 lb (120 kg)

Career information
- High school: Johnsburg
- College: Iowa (2010–2013)
- NFL draft: 2014: 3rd round, 65th overall pick

Career history
- Houston Texans (2014–2017)

Awards and highlights
- First-team All-Big Ten (2013)

Career NFL statistics
- Receptions: 89
- Receiving yards: 881
- Receiving touchdowns: 6
- Stats at Pro Football Reference

Colton John Fiedorowicz (born October 22, 1991) is an American former professional football player who was a tight end in the National Football League (NFL). He was selected by the Houston Texans in the third round of the 2014 NFL draft after playing college football for the Iowa Hawkeyes. Fiedorowicz played his entire four-year professional career with the Texans before retiring during the 2018 offseason, citing recurrent concussions.

== Early life ==
A native of Johnsburg, Illinois, Fiedorowicz attended local Johnsburg High School where he earned first-team all-conference honors for three straight seasons and was league Player of the Year as a senior. For his career, he totaled 183 receptions for 3,121 yards and 42 touchdowns, all school records. He was selected to play in the 2010 U. S. Army All-American Bowl in San Antonio, Texas.

Considered a four-star recruit by Rivals.com, he was rated as the fifth best tight end prospect in his class.

== College career ==
Fiedorowicz attended the University of Iowa from 2010 to 2013. He became a starter during his junior season, and totaled 84 receptions for 830 yards and nine touchdowns in his career. He was named a first-team All-Big Ten Conference selection as a senior.

== Professional career ==
=== Pre-draft ===
On November 25, 2013, it was reported that Fiedorowicz accepted his invitation to play in the 2014 Senior Bowl. The week leading up to the Senior Bowl, Fiedorowicz impressed scouts and media in attendance with his blend of power blocking and receiving ability. He was named the top tight end and Alabama Power's Most Outstanding Receiver during practices by the Senior Bowl's Executive Director Phil Savage. On January 25, 2014, he appeared in the Senior Bowl and recorded two combined tackles as part of Falcons' head coach Mike Smith's North team, who lost 20–10 to the South. Fiedorowicz was one of 22 tight ends who received an invitation to the NFL Combine in Indianapolis, Indiana. He finished fifth among his position group in the 40-yard dash and bench press and finished first among all tight ends in the three-cone drill and short shuttle. On March 24, 2014, Fiedorowicz opted to participate at Iowa's pro day, along with Christian Kirksey, James Morris, Anthony Hitchens, and nine others. He performed positional drills that were led by Cincinnati Bengals' assistant coach Jonathan Hayes, who was among the team representatives and scouts from 28 NFL teams that attended. Throughout the pre-draft process, Fiedorowicz had private meetings and workouts with multiple teams, including the Denver Broncos, San Francisco 49ers, New England Patriots, New York Jets, Atlanta Falcons, Detroit Lions, and Tampa Bay Buccaneers. At the conclusion of the pre-draft process, he was projected to be a third or fourth round pick by NFL draft experts and analysts. Fiedorowicz was ranked the fifth best tight end prospect in the draft by NFLDraftScout.com and NFL analyst Mike Mayock.

Pre-draft measurables
Height	Weight	Arm length	Hand span	40-yard dash	10-yard split	20-yard split	20-yard shuttle	Three-cone drill	Vertical jump	Broad jump	Bench press
6 ft 5 1/2 in (1.97 m)	265 lb (120 kg)	33 in (0.84 m)	10 1/4 in (0.26 m)	4.76 s	1.64 s	2.75 s	4.26 s	7.10 s	31.5 in (0.80 m)	9 ft 8 in (2.95 m)	25 reps
All values from NFL Combine

=== 2014 ===
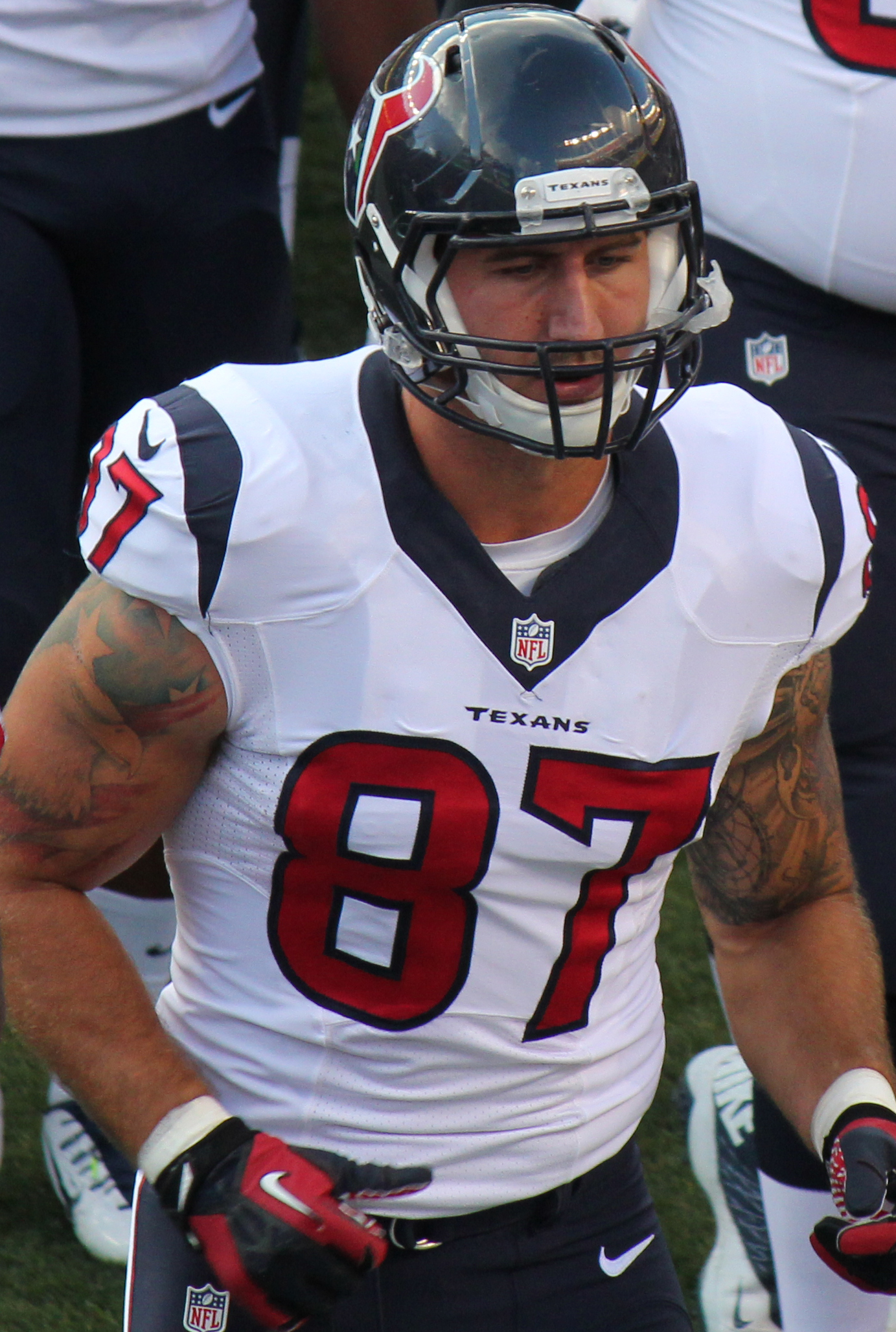
Fiedorowicz with the Texans in 2014

The Houston Texans selected Fiedorowicz in the third round (65th overall) of the 2014 NFL draft. He was the fifth tight end selected in 2014 and the first of only three Iowa players taken that year. On May 26, 2014, the Texans signed Fiedorowicz to a four-year, $3.19 million contract that includes a signing bonus of $703,304. Throughout his first training camp, he competed with Garrett Graham, Ryan Griffin, Zach Potter, and Anthony Denham for the job as the starting tight end. Head coach Bill O'Brien named him the second tight end behind longtime veteran Graham.

He made his professional regular season debut in the Texans' season-opening 17–6 victory against the Washington Redskins. Fiedorowicz was the top tight end in the season-opener after Graham was unable to play due to a back injury. He would go on to miss Week 2 at the Oakland Raiders with a foot injury. On September 21, 2014, Fiedorowicz earned his first career start during a 30–17 loss at the New York Giants. On October 9, 2014, Fiedorowicz caught the first reception of his career on a seven-yard pass by Ryan Fitzpatrick in the second quarter of a 33–28 loss to the Indianapolis Colts. During a Week 16 matchup against the Baltimore Ravens, Fiedorowicz caught a season-high two passes for 12 yards and scored his first career touchdown in their 25–13 victory. His first career touchdown reception came on a trick play in the second quarter. Quarterback Case Keenum pitched the ball to running back Arian Foster who drew the defense in with a fake run and threw a seven-yard pass to Fiedorowicz who was wide open in the end zone. He finished his rookie season in 2014 with four receptions for 28 yards and a touchdown in eight starts and 15 games.

=== 2015 ===
He returned as the second tight end behind Graham for his second season in 2015. Offensive coordinator George Godsey took over play calling duties and implemented a higher use of two tight end sets that increased Fiedorowicz's snap count. He started the season-opener against the Kansas City Chiefs and a pass for a 15-yard gain in Houston's 27–20 loss. On October 4, 2015, he had a season-high three receptions for 28 yards and a touchdown during a 48–21 loss at the Falcons. He finished the season with 17 receptions for 167 receiving yards and a touchdown in 16 games and 14 starts.

=== 2016 ===
With the departure of Graham, Fiedorowicz became the Texans' de facto starting tight end to begin the 2016 season.

During a Week 4 matchup against the Tennessee Titans, he caught four pass for 48 yards and a touchdown as the Texans won 27–20. On October 16, 2016, Fiedorowicz had six receptions for a season-high 85 yards and a touchdown in a 26–23 defeat of the Colts. In Week 8, he made five catches for 43 yards and a touchdown as the Texans defeated the Detroit Lions 20–13. He left the game after a helmet-to-helmet hit from Lions' safety Tavon Wilson while attempting to catch a pass by Brock Osweiler. He later returned to the game after clearing concussion protocol. On November 21, 2016, he caught a season-high six passes for 82 yards during a 27–20 loss to the Raiders. On December 11, 2016, Fiedorowicz left in the fourth quarter of the Texans' 22–17 win at the Colts. He suffered a concussion after catching three passes for 32 yards and was inactive for a Week 15 victory against the Jacksonville Jaguars. He finished the 2016 season with a career-high 54 receptions for 559 yards and four touchdowns in 15 games and 15 starts.

The Texans finished atop the AFC South with a 9–7 record. On January 14, 2017, Fiedorowicz caught three passes for 36 yards and a touchdown as the Texans lost 34–16 in the AFC Divisional round to the eventual Super Bowl LI Champions the Patriots.

=== 2017 ===
On April 31, 2017, the Texans signed Fiedorowicz to a three-year, $21.5 million contract that includes $10.09 million guaranteed.

Fiedorowicz missed the final three preseason games after suffering a concussion in the preseason opener against the Carolina Panthers. He started the Texans' regular-season opener against the Jaguars and caught four passes for 46 yards during their 29–7 loss. Unfortunately, he left the game after suffering a concussion and was placed on injured reserve on September 12, 2017. Fiedorowicz remained on injured reserve for eight games (Weeks 2-10). He was activated off injured reserve to the active roster on November 10, 2017. His first game back, he had two receptions for 10 yards in the Texans' 33–7 loss at the Los Angeles Rams. On December 3, 2017, Fiedorowicz caught two passes for 16 yards in Houston's 24–13 loss to the Titans. He left the game after suffering his third concussion of the season and was placed back on injured reserve on December 5, 2017.

=== Retirement ===
On March 15, 2018, Fiedorowicz announced his retirement from football, citing many concussions he suffered throughout his career.

=== NFL statistics ===
==== Regular season ====
		Receiving							Fumbles	
Season	Team	GP	GS	Rec	Yds	Avg	Long	TD	FUM	Lost
2014	HOU	15	15	4	28	7.0	9	1	0	0
2015	HOU	16	16	17	167	9.8	25	1	1	1
2016	HOU	15	15	54	559	10.4	26	4	1	0
2017	HOU	5	5	14	127	9.1	15	0	0	0
Total		51	51	89	881	9.9	26	6	2	1

==== Postseason ====
		Receiving						
Season	Team	GP	GS	Rec	Yds	Avg	Long	TD
2015	HOU	1	1	1	1	1.0	1	0
2016	HOU	2	2	5	71	14.2	18	1
Total		3	3	6	72	12	18	1
