= K. J. Dillon =

American football player (born 1993)

No. 36
- Position: Safety

Personal information
- Born: May 11, 1993 (age 33); Apopka, Florida, U.S.
- Listed height: 6 ft 0 in (1.83 m)
- Listed weight: 210 lb (95 kg)

Career information
- High school: Apopka
- College: West Virginia
- NFL draft: 2016: 5th round, 159th overall pick

Career history
- Houston Texans (2016); Arizona Cardinals (2017)*; Arizona Hotshots (2019)*
- * Offseason or practice squad member only
- Stats at Pro Football Reference

K. J. Dillon (born May 11, 1993) is an American former professional football player who was a safety in the National Football League (NFL). He played college football for the West Virginia Mountaineers.

== Professional career ==
Pre-draft measurables
Height	Weight	Arm length	Hand span	40-yard dash	10-yard split	20-yard split	20-yard shuttle	Three-cone drill	Vertical jump	Broad jump	Bench press
6 ft 0 3/8 in (1.84 m)	210 lb (95 kg)	31 5/8 in (0.80 m)	9 5/8 in (0.24 m)	4.53 s	1.50 s	2.64 s	4.43 s	7.27 s	28.0 in (0.71 m)	10 ft 1 in (3.07 m)	11 reps
All values from NFL Combine/Pro Day

=== Houston Texans ===
Dillon was selected by the Houston Texans in the fifth round (159th overall) of the 2016 NFL draft. He was placed on injured reserve on October 19, 2016.

On September 2, 2017, Dillon was waived by the Texans.

=== Arizona Cardinals ===
On December 7, 2017, Dillon was signed to the practice squad of the Arizona Cardinals.

=== Arizona Hotshots ===
In 2018, Dillon signed with the Arizona Hotshots of the Alliance of American Football for the 2019 season, but was waived on January 10, 2019, before the start of the regular season.

In October 2019, the Houston Roughnecks of the XFL drafted Dillon during the open phase of the 2020 XFL draft.
