= Killian Nine =

Miami Dade County Juvenile case

The Killian Nine were a group of high school students at Miami Killian High School who, on February 23, 1998, made a satirical pamphlet called "First Amendment" and passed it out to fellow students. The pamphlet contained poems, essays, cartoons, and writings, several of which were deemed objectionable by the school administration. Included were a drawing of a dart through the head of the school's principal, Timothy Dawson. The pamphlet also contained the statement, "I often have wondered what would happen if I shot Dawson in the head and other teachers who have pissed me off." Dawson claimed that he feared for his life in response to the pamphlet.

== Reaction to the pamphlet ==
Once school authorities discovered the identities of the Killian Nine, the students were pulled from their classes one by one and threatened with arrest. After the students each gave a written statement, the school security handcuffed them and had them arrested.

The students who were under 18 years of age were taken to Miami Dade County Juvenile Center, and those over 18, were sent to Turner Guilford Knight Jail. All of the "Killian Nine" were booked and fingerprinted. In addition, Liliana Cuesta, who was responsible for labeling the pamphlet "First Amendment" and assembling the pamphlet itself, was subjected to a strip search. The students were suspended for 10 days, and later expelled.

These arrests marked the first time that Florida Statute 836.11 (1945) was applied. The 53-year-old statute prohibited anonymous publication, if doing so "tends to expose any individual or religious group to hatred, contempt, ridicule or obloquy."

Charges were eventually dropped but the ACLU decided to file suit.

== The civil lawsuit ==
In March 1999, the Greater Miami Chapter of the ACLU filed a suit on behalf of Liliana Cuesta (as well as the rest of the "Killian Nine") in the United States District Court in Miami. The complaint alleged that Miami-Dade County violated Cuesta's First Amendment right to free speech and Fourth Amendment freedom from unreasonable search and seizure under the U.S. Constitution.

In 2002, a federal appellate court found that Cuesta's arrest did not violate her constitutional rights.
