= Miami Killian Senior High School =

Location
- 10655 SW 97th Ave; Miami, Florida 33176; United States; 25.67019°N 80.35078°W

Information
- School type: Public secondary
- Motto: "The Legacy Continues"
- Established: September 1965
- School district: Miami-Dade County Public Schools
- School code: 7361
- Principal: Milagro Arango
- Staff: 46.00 (FTE)
- Grades: 9–12
- Enrollment: 870 (2023–2024)
- Average class size: 20
- Student to teacher ratio: 18.91
- Hours in school day: 7:20 am – 2:20 pm
- Campus: Suburban
- Colors: Green and gold
- Athletics: Football, baseball, basketball, bowling, swimming, wrestling, track & field, soccer, volleyball, golf, softball
- Mascot: Cougar
- Yearbook: Catamount
- Website: www.miamikillianhs.com

Miami Killian Senior High School is a secondary school located at 10655 SW 97th Ave, Miami, FL 33176 in the Kendall area of unincorporated Miami-Dade County, Florida, United States. The school is part of the Miami-Dade County Public Schools System.

Miami Killian Senior High School is a Cambridge International school.

== Academics ==
Miami Killian offers over 20 AP (Advanced Placement) courses, about 15 of which can be taken for college credit if a student passes the culminating exam at the end of the year.

== Demographics ==
As of 2024, Miami Killian Senior High School was 73% Hispanic or Latino, 20% Black/African American, 5% White, 1% Asian or Asian American, and 1% two or more races.

== Incidents ==
The Killian Nine were a group of high school students at Miami Killian High School who, on February 23, 1998, made a satirical pamphlet called "First Amendment" and passed it out to fellow students. The pamphlet contained poems, essays, cartoons, and writings, several of which were deemed objectionable by the school administration. Included were a drawing of a dart through the head of the school's principal, Timothy Dawson. The pamphlet also contained the statement, "I often have wondered what would happen if I shot Dawson in the head and other teachers who have pissed me off." Dawson claimed that he feared for his life in response to the pamphlet. Once school authorities discovered the identities of the Killian Nine, the students were pulled from their classes and threatened with arrest. After the students each gave a written statement, the school security handcuffed them and had them arrested.

On November 19, 2002, 16-year-old Killian student Karen Urbina was beaten to death with a baseball bat, along with her 18-year-old boyfriend Justin Morejon, by his 17-year-old cousin, Jonathon Nodal, who was charged with two counts of first-degree murder and sentenced to life in prison in 2012.

On March 31, 2015 sophomore defensive end DeAndre Johnson, 15, was stabbed by a 17-year-old female senior with a kitchen knife. She was charged with felony attempted murder and possession of a weapon on school grounds, according to a district spokeswoman. The school was placed on lockdown following the incident.

On March 8, 2018, five students were arrested for assaulting a freshman in the cafeteria; this was recorded and shared on social media. The five students were charged with battery and disruption of a school environment.

On April 13, 2018, 17-year-old Angel Lopez was killed while riding his bicycle from the school after being struck by a Florida Highway Patrol trooper while he was attempting to cross Killian Parkway near 107th Avenue.

On February 5, 2018, former Miami Killian students Adrian Abanto and Abraham Pedilla were accused and charged with burglarizing the school.

== Notable alumni ==
=== Athletics ===
==== Baseball ====
- Andy Barkett - former professional baseball player (Pittsburgh Pirates) and current manager of the Jacksonville Suns
- Marty Bystrom - former professional baseball player (Philadelphia Phillies, New York Yankees)
- Alex Gonzalez - former professional baseball player (Toronto Blue Jays, Chicago Cubs, Montreal Expos, San Diego Padres, Tampa Bay Rays, Philadelphia Phillies)
- Charlie Greene - former professional baseball player (New York Mets, Baltimore Orioles, Milwaukee Brewers, Toronto Blue Jays)
- Freddy Zamora - professional baseball player (Carolina Mudcats, Wisconsin Timber Rattlers, Nashville Sounds)

==== Basketball ====
- Raja Bell - former Utah Jazz guard of the NBA
- Steve Blake - Detroit Pistons guard of the NBA
- Ricky Blanton - former forward for the NBA Chicago Bulls and NCAA LSU Tigers
- Alex Starling - basketball player in Australia

==== Football ====
- Jamie Brown - offensive tackle, played for the Denver Broncos, San Francisco 49ers, and the Washington Redskins
- Bret Cooper - football player
- Evan Cooper - defensive back, played for Philadelphia Eagles and the Atlanta Falcons
- Mark Cooper - NFL lineman, played for the Denver Broncos and the Tampa Bay Buccaneers
- Kennard Cox - former NFL cornerback
- Rufus Ferguson - former Atlanta Falcons running back
- Tony Gaiter - former New England Patriots and San Diego Chargers wide receiver
- Derrick Gibson - former Oakland Raiders safety and current safeties coach for the Florida Atlantic Owls
- Frank Gore Jr. - college football running back for the Southern Miss Golden Eagles; son of Frank Gore
- Randal Hill - former NFL and University of Miami receiver
- Danny Hope - former head football coach at Eastern Kentucky University and Purdue University
- Jaquan Johnson - Buffalo Bills safety from the University of Miami
- Lamar Miller - running back for the Houston Texans
- Rod Payne - center, played for the Cincinnati Bengals
- Keith Reaser - NFL cornerback, San Francisco 49ers
- Sheldrick Redwine - NFL safety for the Cleveland Browns from the University of Miami
- Reggie Sutton - defensive back, played for the New Orleans Saints
- Sean Taylor - late NFL safety for the Washington Redskins and University of Miami, began his high school football career at Miami Killian High School but transferred to Gulliver Preparatory School
- Pat Thomas - linebacker, played for Jacksonville Jaguars and the Kansas City Chiefs
- Stephen Tulloch - linebacker for the Detroit Lions, Tennessee Titans, and the Philadelphia Eagles

==== Soccer ====
- Diego Walsh - Midfielder for teams in the MLS, NASL, A-League, USL, and TPL

==== Other ====
- David Avellan - professional WEC fighter and ADCC bronze medalist
- Alex Caceres - professional UFC fighter
- Michael Oliveira - professional boxer
- Jean-Julien Rojer - professional tennis player

=== Miscellaneous ===
- Jeff Baena - Filmmaker
- Kent Fuchs - president of the University of Florida (2015–2023)
- Michael Lawrence Goldberg - film & television producer, and co-founder of Story Kitchen
- Michelle Kaufman - sportswriter at the Miami Herald
- Pouya - Singer-songwriter
- Andy Slater - sports talk-show host
- Chuck Todd - NBC News' Chief White House Correspondent
- Doug Traub - marketing executive who specialized in managing destination marketing organizations (DMOs)
