= Killings (surname) =

Killings is a surname. Notable people with the surname include:

- Cedric Killings (born 1977), American football player
- Debra Killings (born 1966), American singer and bass guitarist
- D. J. Killings (born 1995), American football player
- Ron Killings (born 1972), American professional wrestler, actor and rapper

== See also ==
- Killing (surname)
