= Ryan Griffin (tight end) =

American football player (born 1990)

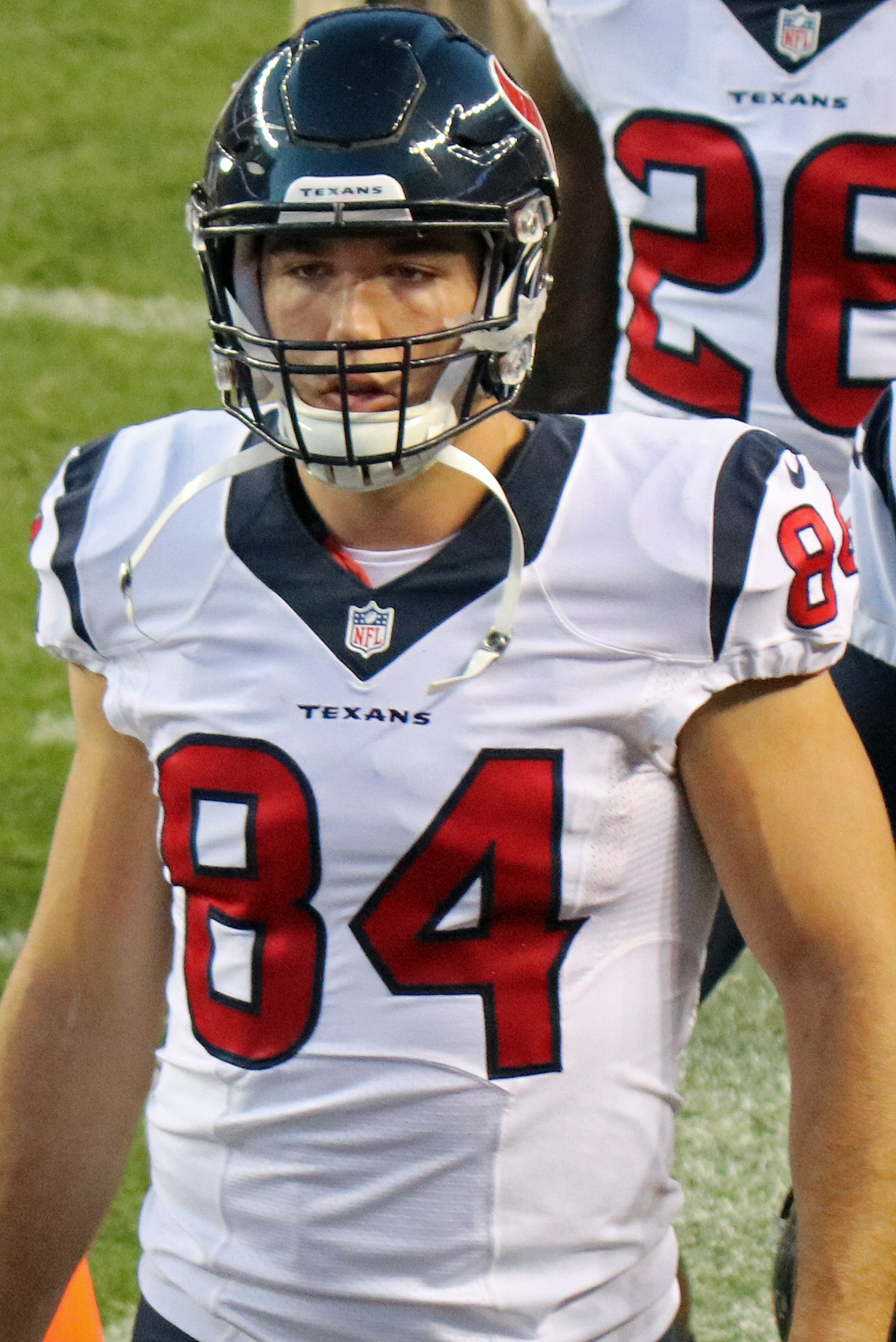
- Griffin with the Houston Texans in 2016

No. 84, 86
- Position: Tight end

Personal information
- Born: January 11, 1990 (age 36); Londonderry, New Hampshire, U.S.
- Listed height: 6 ft 6 in (1.98 m)
- Listed weight: 255 lb (116 kg)

Career information
- High school: Londonderry
- College: Connecticut (2008–2012)
- NFL draft: 2013: 6th round, 201st overall pick

Career history
- Houston Texans (2013–2018); New York Jets (2019–2021); Chicago Bears (2022)

Awards and highlights
- 2× Second-team All-Big East (2011, 2012)

Career NFL statistics
- Receptions: 210
- Receiving yards: 2,184
- Receiving touchdowns: 14
- Stats at Pro Football Reference

Ryan Francis Griffin (born January 11, 1990) is an American former professional football player who was a tight end in the National Football League (NFL). He played college football for the UConn Huskies,and was selected by the Houston Texans in the sixth round of the 2013 NFL draft. He has also played for the New York Jets and Chicago Bears.

== College career ==
As a junior, Griffin was one of 25 tight ends to be named to the John Mackey Award Midseason Watch List. He finished his college career with 10 touchdowns and 116 receptions, second all-time by a tight end. His six touchdowns in 2012 tied for second-most in school history for a single season. In 2012, he was named UConn's Offensive Player of the Year.

== Professional career ==
Pre-draft measurables
Height	Weight	Arm length	Hand span	40-yard dash	10-yard split	20-yard split	20-yard shuttle	Three-cone drill	Vertical jump	Broad jump	Bench press
6 ft 6 1/8 in (1.98 m)	261 lb (118 kg)	33 1/4 in (0.84 m)	9 7/8 in (0.25 m)	4.87 s	1.68 s	2.84 s	4.43 s	7.01 s	34.5 in (0.88 m)	9 ft 5 in (2.87 m)	21 reps
All values from UConn's Pro Day

=== Houston Texans ===
==== 2013 ====
The Houston Texans selected Griffin in the sixth round (201st overall) of the 2013 NFL draft. Griffin was the 12th tight end drafted in 2013.

On May 12, 2013, the Houston Texans signed Griffin to a four-year, $2.23 million contract that includes a signing bonus of $78,680.

During training camp, Griffin competed to be he third tight end on the depth chart against Phillip Supernaw and Jake Byrne. Head coach Gary Kubiak named Griffin the third tight end on the Texans' depth chart to begin the regular season, behind Owen Daniels and Garrett Graham.

He made his professional regular season debut in the Houston Texans' season-opening 31–28 win at the San Diego Chargers. On October 13, 2013, Griffin caught two passes for 18-yards during a 38–13 loss to the St. Louis Rams in Week 6. Griffin made his first career reception off a ten-yard pass by Texans' quarterback T. J. Yates in the fourth quarter. On October 8, 2013, Griffin was named the secondary starting tight end after Owen Daniels was placed on injured reserve due to a non-displaced fractured fibula he sustained in Week 5. On October 20, 2013, Griffin earned his first career start during the Texans' 17–16 loss at the Kansas City Chiefs in Week 7. On November 10, 2013, Griffin scored his first career touchdown during a 27–24 loss at the Arizona Cardinals. Griffin caught his first career touchdown on a two-yard pass from Texans' quarterback Case Keenum in the second quarter. Griffin sustained a concussion during their loss at the Cardinals and was inactive for their Week 11 loss against the Oakland Raiders. On December 6, 2013, the Houston Texans fired head coach Gary Kubiak after they fell to a 2–11 record. Defensive coordinator Wade Phillips was named the interim head coach for the remainder of the season. In Week 15, he caught a season-high six passes for 62-yards during a 25–3 loss at the Indianapolis Colts. The following week, made five receptions for a season-high 66 receiving yards in the Cardinals' 37–13 loss to the Denver Broncos in Week 16. He finished his rookie season in 2013 with 19 receptions for 244 receiving yards and one touchdown in 15 games and eight starts.

==== 2014 ====
Griffin entered training camp slated as the second tight end on the Texans' depth chart and competed to retain the role against rookie C. J. Fiedorowicz. Head coach Bill O'Brien named Griffin the third tight end on the depth chart to start the 2014 season, behind Garrett Graham and C.J. Fiedorowicz. In Week 13, Griffin caught an eight-yard touchdown pass from Texans' quarterback Ryan Fitzpatrick during the first quarter of their 45–21 win against the Tennessee Titans. On December 21, 2014, Griffin caught a season-high three passes for 25 yards in the Texans' 25–13 victory against the Baltimore Ravens in Week 16. Griffin finished the season with ten receptions for 91 yards and one touchdown in 16 games and two starts.

==== 2015 ====
On June 9, 2015, the Houston Texans promoted quarterbacks coach George Godsey to offensive coordinator. Godsey took over offensive coordinator duties from head coach Bill O'Brien. Head coach Bill O'Brien named Griffin a backup tight end to start the regular season, behind Garrett Graham and C.J. Fiedorowicz. On September 15, 2015, the Houston Texans placed Griffin on injured reserve with a designation to return after he sustained a knee injury during their season-opening 27–20 loss to the Kansas City Chiefs. He was inactive for the Texans' next seven games (Weeks 2–8) due to a sprained MCL. On November 15, 2015, the Houston Texans activated Griffin off of their injured reserve list. In Week 12, Griffin caught a season-high four passes for 72 yards and a touchdown during a 24–6 win against the New Orleans Saints. He finished the 2015 NFL season with 20 receptions for 251 receiving yards and two touchdowns in nine games and four starts.

==== 2016 ====
Griffin entered training camp slated as the second tight end on the depth chart. Head coach Bill O'Brien named Griffin the second tight end on the depth chart in 2016, behind C.J. Fiedorowicz. In Week 3, he caught a season-high eight passes for 52 yards during a 27–0 loss at the New England Patriots. On December 18, 2016, Griffin made eight receptions for a season-high 85 yards in the Texans' 21–20 victory against the Jacksonville Jaguars in Week 15. He finished the season with a career-high 50 receptions for 442 receiving yards and two touchdowns in 16 games and five starts.

==== 2017 ====
On January 16, 2017, the Houston Texans fired offensive coordinator George Godsey. Head coach Bill O'Brien took over duties as the Texans' offensive coordinator.

On March 11, 2017, the Houston Texans signed Griffin to a three-year, $9 million contract that includes $3.22 million guaranteed.

He started in the Houston Texans' season-opener against the Jacksonville Jaguars but exited the game in the second quarter after suffering a concussion. On September 24, 2017, Griffin caught a season-high five passes for 61 yards and a touchdown during a 36–33 loss at the New England Patriots in Week 3. On November 5, 2017, Griffin suffered his second concussion of the season during the Texans' 20–14 loss to the Indianapolis Colts in Week 9. On November 10, 2017, the Houston Texans placed Griffin on injured reserve for the remainder of the season. He finished the 2017 NFL season with 13 receptions for 158 receiving yards and a touchdown in seven games and six starts.

==== 2018 ====
Griffin entered training camp slated as the de facto No. 1 tight end on the depth chart after C. J. Fiedorowicz announced his retirement due to concern over his numerous concussions. Griffin competed to retain his role against rookie Jordan Akins. Head coach Bill O'Brien named Griffin the starting tight end to begin the 2018 NFL season. He played in 14 games with 11 starts, recording 24 receptions for 305 yards.

On May 17, 2019, the Texans released Griffin.

=== New York Jets ===
On July 22, 2019, Griffin was signed by the New York Jets. In Week 8 against the Jacksonville Jaguars, Griffin caught four passes for 66 yards and two touchdowns in the 29–15 loss. During Week 11 against the Washington Redskins, Griffin finished with five catches for 109 receiving yards and a touchdown as the Jets won 34–17. The performance marked his first career game with over 100 yards On November 23, Griffin signed a three-year extension with the Jets worth $10.8 million with $4 million guaranteed. On December 12, Griffin was placed on IR after suffering an ankle injury in Week 14 against the Miami Dolphins. Overall, Griffin finished the 2019 season with 34 receptions for 320 receiving yards and five receiving touchdowns.

Griffin was placed on the active/physically unable to perform list by the Jets at the start of training camp on July 30, 2020. He was activated on August 22, 2020. He was placed on the reserve/COVID-19 list by the team on December 23, 2020, and activated on December 29.

Griffin entered the 2021 season as the Jets starting tight end. He suffered a knee injury in Week 15 and was placed on injured reserve on December 21, 2021. He finished the season with 27 catches for 261 yards and two touchdowns through 14 games and 12 starts.

Griffin was released by the Jets on April 4, 2022.

=== Chicago Bears ===
On April 8, 2022, Griffin was signed by the Chicago Bears

=== NFL statistics ===
Regular season statistics
Season		Receiving							Fumbles	
Year	Team	GP	GS	Rec	Yds	Avg	Long	TD	FUM	Lost
2013	HOU	15	8	19	244	12.8	40	1	0	0
2014	HOU	16	2	10	91	9.1	25	1	0	0
2015	HOU	9	4	20	251	12.6	37	2	0	0
2016	HOU	16	5	50	442	8.8	45	2	1	1
2017	HOU	7	6	13	158	12.2	35	1	0	0
2018	HOU	14	11	24	305	12.7	47	0	0	0
2019	NYJ	13	13	34	320	9.4	45	5	0	0
2020	NYJ	15	6	12	86	9.6	23	0	0	0
2021	NYJ	14	12	27	261	9.7	29	2	1	0
2022	CHI	15	0	4	26	6.5	18	0	0	0
Total		134	67	210	2,184	10.4	47	14	2	1

Postseason statistics
Season		Receiving							Fumbles	
Season	Team	GP	GS	Rec	Yds	Avg	Long	TD	FUM	Lost
2015	HOU	1	1	3	29	9.7	15	0	0	0
2016	HOU	2	1	3	29	9.7	13	0	0	0
2018	HOU	1	1	1	6	6.0	6	0	0	0

== Legal issues ==
On April 27, 2019, Griffin was arrested at Hotel Indigo in Nashville, Tennessee for public intoxication and vandalism. Griffin was allegedly drunk and punched a window inside his hotel room. He was released from jail on a $1,750 bond the next morning. The charges were later dismissed.
