= Killen (surname) =

Killen is a surname. Notable people with the surname include:

- Bill Killen (born 1938), American politician
- Chris Killen (born 1981), New Zealand football player
- Edgar Ray Killen (1925–2018), American criminal
- Eric Lyle Killen (1892–1955), Australian pastoralist
- Frank Killen (1870–1939), American baseball player
- Ged Killen, British politician
- James Killen (1925–2007), Australian politician
- Lou Killen (1934–2013), English folk singer
- M. Evelyn Killen (1871-1951), American temperance advocate
- William Dool Killen (1806–1902), Irish Presbyterian minister and church historian
- William Wilson Killen (1860–1939), Australian politician

== See also ==
- Killens
