= RaShaun Allen =

American football player (born 1990)

No. 87
- Position: Tight end

Personal information
- Born: May 25, 1989 (age 37); Cleveland, Ohio, U.S.
- Listed height: 6 ft 4 in (1.93 m)
- Listed weight: 250 lb (113 kg)

Career information
- High school: John Adams (Cleveland)
- College: Southern (2010–2013)
- NFL draft: 2014: undrafted

Career history
- Seattle Seahawks (2014); Minnesota Vikings (2014)*; Seattle Seahawks (2014–2015); New Orleans Saints (2015); Pittsburgh Steelers (2016)*; Houston Texans (2016–2017)*
- * Offseason or practice squad member only
- Stats at Pro Football Reference

RaShaun Allen (born May 25, 1989) is an American former professional football tight end. He played college football at Southern University. He was a member of the Seattle Seahawks, Minnesota Vikings, New Orleans Saints, Pittsburgh Steelers, and Houston Texans.

== Early life ==
Allen played high school football at John Adams High School in Cleveland, Ohio and graduated in 2009. He helped the Rebels to an 8–2 record in his senior year and was named honorable mention all-district.

== College career ==
Allen played for the Southern Jaguars from 2010 to 2013.

== Professional career ==
Pre-draft measurables
Height	Weight	40-yard dash	10-yard split	20-yard split	20-yard shuttle	Three-cone drill	Vertical jump	Broad jump	Bench press
6 ft 5 in (1.96 m)	250 lb (113 kg)	4.68 s	1.69 s	2.66 s	4.52 s	7.35 s	38 in (0.97 m)	9 ft 7 in (2.92 m)	24 reps
All values from Southern Pro Day

Allen signed with the Seattle Seahawks on May 19, 2014, after going undrafted in the 2014 NFL draft. He was released by the Seahawks on August 30 and signed to the team's practice squad on August 31, 2014. He made his NFL debut on October 19, 2014, against the St. Louis Rams. He was waived on October 21, 2014, but re-signed to the team's practice squad on October 23, 2014. Allen was released by the Seahawks on October 30, 2014.

Allen was signed to the Minnesota Vikings' practice squad on November 3, 2014.

Allen was signed by the Seahawks off the Vikings practice squad on November 11, 2014. He was released by the Seahawks on December 20, 2014. He was signed to the Seahawks' practice squad on December 23, 2014. Allen was released by the Seahawks on September 5, 2015, and signed to the team's practice squad on September 6, 2015. He was released by the Seahawks on November 3, 2015.

On November 10, 2015, Allen was signed to the New Orleans Saints' practice squad. On December 30, 2015, he was signed to the Saints' active roster. He was released by the team on August 30, 2016.

Allen was signed to the Pittsburgh Steelers' practice squad on September 4, 2016. He was released by the Steelers on October 25, 2016.

On September 7, Allen was signed to the Houston Texans' practice squad. He signed a reserve/future contract with the Texans on January 16, 2017. Allen was waived/injured by the Texans on September 2, 2017, and placed on injured reserve the next day. On September 7, 2017, he was waived after agreeing to an injury settlement.
