= Killing (surname) =

Killing is a surname. Notable people with the surname include:

- Alison Killing, British architect and urban designer
- Laure Killing (1959–2019), French actress
- Wesley Killing (born 1993), Canadian pair skater
- Wilhelm Killing (1847–1923), German mathematician

== See also ==
- Killings (surname)
