= 2015 Houston Texans season =

14th season in franchise history

- Owner: Bob McNair
- General manager: Rick Smith
- Head coach: Bill O'Brien
- Offensive coordinator: George Godsey
- Defensive coordinator: Romeo Crennel
- Home stadium: NRG Stadium

Results
- Record: 9–7
- Division place: 1st AFC South
- Playoffs: Lost Wild Card Playoffs (vs. Chiefs) 0–30
- All-Pros: 2: WR DeAndre Hopkins; DE J. J. Watt
- Pro Bowlers: 3: WR DeAndre Hopkins; DE J. J. Watt; LS Jon Weeks

Uniform
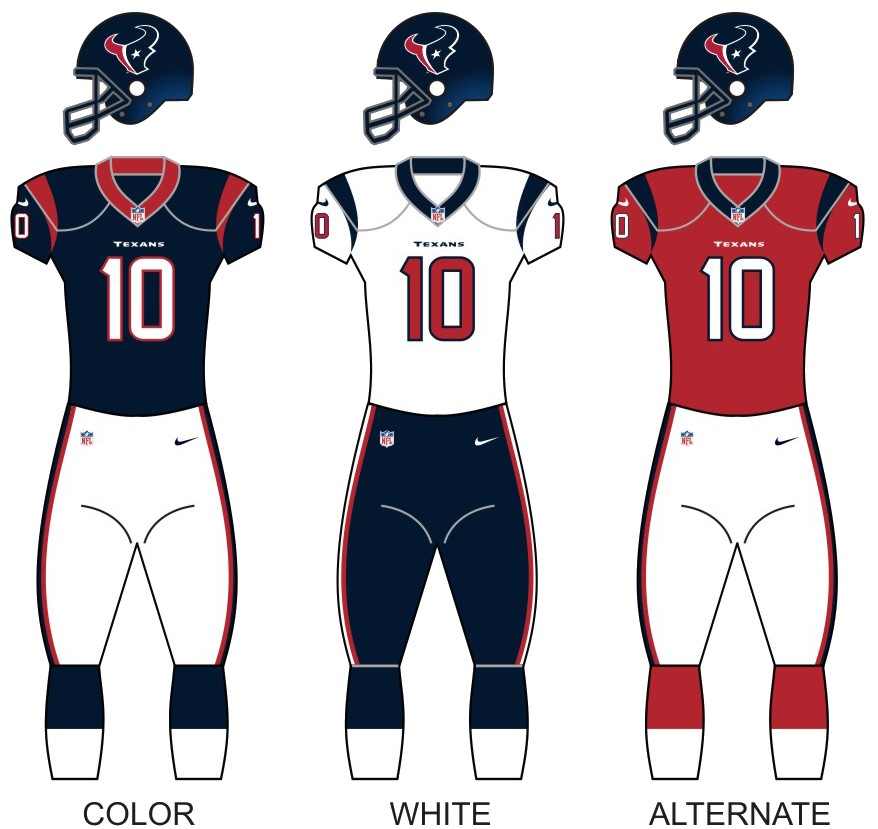

The 2015 season was the Houston Texans' 14th in the National Football League (NFL) and their second under head coach Bill O'Brien.

This season was the first since 2002 that Andre Johnson was not on the team's opening day roster.

Houston started the season going into their bye week at 3–5, including blowout losses to the Atlanta Falcons (48–21) and against the Miami Dolphins (44–26). However, the Texans had a surge in the second half of the season, going 6–2 after the bye. The 2015 season marked the first time the Texans beat the Colts in Indianapolis, helped in part by third–string quarterback Brandon Weeden. The Texans matched their win total from the 2014 season, finishing 9–7, and gained their first division title and postseason trip since 2012, but were shutout, 30–0, at home by the Kansas City Chiefs in the Wild Card round.

The 2015 Houston Texans were featured on the HBO documentary series Hard Knocks.

== 2015 draft class ==
2015 Houston Texans draft
Round	Pick	Player	Position	College	Notes
1	16	Kevin Johnson	CB	Wake Forest	
2	43	Benardrick McKinney *	ILB	Mississippi State	from Cleveland
3	70	Jaelen Strong	WR	Arizona State	from New York Jets
5	175	Keith Mumphery	WR	Michigan State	Compensatory pick
6	211	Reshard Cliett	OLB	South Florida	Compensatory pick
6	216	Christian Covington	DT	Rice	Compensatory pick
7	235	Kenny Hilliard	RB	LSU	
Made roster † Pro Football Hall of Fame * Made at least one Pro Bowl during career

== Staff ==
2015 Houston Texans staff
Front office: Founder/chairman/CEO – Bob McNair; Vice chairman – D. Cal McNair; Executive vice president/general manager – Rick Smith; President – Jamey Rootes; Vice president of football administration – Chris Olsen; Vice president of football operations – Doug West; Senior personnel advisor – Bobby Grier; Director of player personnel – Brian Gaine; Director of college scouting – Jon Carr; Director of football research – Jim Bernhardt; Assistant director of pro personnel – Larry Wright; Head coaches: Head coach – Bill O'Brien; Offensive coaches: Offensive coordinator – George Godsey; Running backs – Charles London; Wide receivers – Stan Hixon; Tight ends – John Perry; Offensive line – Mike Devlin; Offensive assistant – Pat O'Hara; Offensive quality control – Tim Kelly	Defensive coaches: Defensive coordinator – Romeo Crennel; Defensive line – Paul Pasqualoni; Linebackers – Mike Vrabel; Secondary – John Butler; Assistant secondary – Anthony Midget; Defensive assistant – Anthony Pleasant; Defensive quality control – Will Lawing; Special teams coaches: Special teams coordinator – Bob Ligashesky; Assistant special teams – Doug Colman; Strength and conditioning: Head strength and conditioning – Craig Fitzgerald; Assistant strength and conditioning – Sean Hayes; Assistant strength and conditioning – Brian Bell

== Final roster ==
2015 Houston Texans roster
Quarterbacks (QB): 5 Brandon Weeden; 7 Brian Hoyer; 15 Ryan Mallett; Running backs (RB): 28 Alfred Blue; 41 Jonathan Grimes; 33 Akeem Hunt; 22 Chris Polk; 45 Jay Prosch FB; Wide receivers (WR): 10 DeAndre Hopkins; 12 Keith Mumphery; 18 Cecil Shorts; 11 Jaelen Strong; 85 Nate Washington; Tight ends (TE): 87 C. J. Fiedorowicz; 88 Garrett Graham; 84 Ryan Griffin	Offensive linemen (OL): 78 Oday Aboushi G; 79 Brandon Brooks G; 76 Duane Brown T; 74 Chris Clark T; 60 Ben Jones C; 72 Derek Newton T; 63 Kendall Lamm T; 71 Xavier Suʻa-Filo G; Defensive linemen (DL): 95 Christian Covington DE; 93 Jared Crick DE; 92 Brandon Dunn NT; 97 Jeoffrey Pagan DE; 99 J. J. Watt DE; 75 Vince Wilfork NT	Linebackers (LB): 53 Max Bullough ILB; 90 Jadeveon Clowney OLB; 56 Brian Cushing ILB; 50 Akeem Dent ILB; 55 Benardrick McKinney ILB; 59 Whitney Mercilus OLB; 52 Brian Peters OLB; 51 John Simon OLB; 57 Justin Tuggle ILB; Defensive backs (DB): 34 A. J. Bouye CB; 27 Quintin Demps SS; 40 Kurtis Drummond SS; 29 Andre Hal FS; 25 Kareem Jackson CB; 30 Kevin Johnson CB/S; 24 Johnathan Joseph CB; 43 Corey Moore FS; 26 Rahim Moore FS; 21 Darryl Morris CB; 35 Eddie Pleasant SS; Special teams (ST): 8 Nick Novak K; 9 Shane Lechler P; 46 Jon Weeks LS	Practice squad: 73 Karim Barton G; 47 Jordan DeWalt-Ondijo OLB; 64 Dalton Freeman C; 38 Kenny Hilliard RB; 19 Josh Lenz WR; 32 Robert Nelson CB; 96 Dan Pettinato DE; 48 Gerald Rivers OLB; 83 Eric Tomlinson TE; 49 Tony Washington OLB (IR); 13 Chandler Worthy WR; Reserve: 70 Jeff Adams G (IR); 39 Lonnie Ballentine FS (IR); 58 Reshard Cliett OLB (IR); 81 Anthony Denham TE (IR); 23 Arian Foster RB (IR); 31 Charles James CB (IR); 65 Greg Mancz C (IR); 77 David Quessenberry T (NF-Ill.); 3 Tom Savage QB (IR); 62 Chad Slade G (IR); 44 Carlos Thompson OLB (IR); 6 T. J. Yates QB (IR); Rookies in italics 53 active, 13 reserve, 10 practice squad

== Schedule ==
=== Preseason ===
Week	Date	Opponent	Result	Record	Venue	Recap
1	August 15	San Francisco 49ers	**W** 23–10	1–0	NRG Stadium	Recap
2	August 22	Denver Broncos	**L** 10–14	1–1	NRG Stadium	Recap
3	August 30	at New Orleans Saints	**W** 27–13	2–1	Mercedes-Benz Superdome	Recap
4	September 3	at Dallas Cowboys	**L** 14–21	2–2	AT&T Stadium	Recap

=== Regular season ===
Week	Date	Opponent	Result	Record	Venue	Recap
1	September 13	Kansas City Chiefs	**L** 20–27	0–1	NRG Stadium	Recap
2	September 20	at Carolina Panthers	**L** 17–24	0–2	Bank of America Stadium	Recap
3	September 27	Tampa Bay Buccaneers	**W** 19–9	1–2	NRG Stadium	Recap
4	October 4	at Atlanta Falcons	**L** 21–48	1–3	Georgia Dome	Recap
5	October 8	**Indianapolis Colts**	**L** 20–27	1–4	NRG Stadium	Recap
6	October 18	at **Jacksonville Jaguars**	**W** 31–20	2–4	EverBank Field	Recap
7	October 25	at Miami Dolphins	**L** 26–44	2–5	Sun Life Stadium	Recap
8	November 1	**Tennessee Titans**	**W** 20–6	3–5	NRG Stadium	Recap
9	Bye					
10	November 16	at Cincinnati Bengals	**W** 10–6	4–5	Paul Brown Stadium	Recap
11	November 22	New York Jets	**W** 24–17	5–5	NRG Stadium	Recap
12	November 29	New Orleans Saints	**W** 24–6	6–5	NRG Stadium	Recap
13	December 6	at Buffalo Bills	**L** 21–30	6–6	Ralph Wilson Stadium	Recap
14	December 13	New England Patriots	**L** 6–27	6–7	NRG Stadium	Recap
15	December 20	at **Indianapolis Colts**	**W** 16–10	7–7	Lucas Oil Stadium	Recap
16	December 27	at **Tennessee Titans**	**W** 34–6	8–7	Nissan Stadium	Recap
17	January 3	**Jacksonville Jaguars**	**W** 30–6	9–7	NRG Stadium	Recap

Note: Intra-division opponents are in bold text.

=== Postseason ===
Round	Date	Opponent (seed)	Result	Record	Venue	Recap
Wild Card	January 9, 2016	Kansas City Chiefs (5)	**L** 0–30	0–1	NRG Stadium	Recap

== Game summaries ==
=== Regular season ===
==== Week 1: vs. Kansas City Chiefs ====
Week One: Kansas City Chiefs at Houston Texans – Game summary

Quarter	1	2	3	4	Total
Chiefs	14	13	0	0	27
Texans	6	3	0	11	20

at NRG Stadium, Houston, Texas

- Date: September 13
- Game time: 12:00 p.m. CDT
- Game weather: Played indoors (retractable roof closed)
- Game attendance: 71,776
- Referee: Pete Morelli
- TV announcers (CBS): Kevin Harlan and Rich Gannon
- Recap, Gamebook

Game information

First quarter

- KC 10:22 – Travis Kelce 10 yard pass from Alex Smith (Cairo Santos kick) KC 7-0
- KC 4:28 – Travis Kelce 42 yard pass from Alex Smith (Cairo Santos kick) KC 14-0
- HOU 0:46 – DeAndre Hopkins 4 yard pass from Brian Hoyer KC 14-6

Second quarter

- KC 10:26 – Cairo Santos 27 yard field goal KC 17-6
- KC 6:20 – Cairo Santos 48 yard field goal KC 20-6
- KC 4:55 – Jamaal Charles 7 yard pass from Alex Smith (Cairo Santos kick) KC 27-6
- HOU 0:09 – Randy Bullock 34 yard field goal KC 27-9

Third quarter

- No scoring plays

Fourth quarter

- HOU 4:07 – DeAndre Hopkins 8 yard pass from Ryan Mallett (Mallett to Hopkins for two-point conversion) KC 27-17
- HOU 1:23 – Randy Bullock 47 yard field goal KC 27-20

Top passers

- KC – Alex Smith 22/33, 243 yards, 3 TDs
- HOU – Brian Hoyer 18/34, 236 yards, 1 TD, 1 INT

Top rushers

- KC – Jamaal Charles 16 carries, 57 yards
- HOU – Alfred Blue 9 carries, 42 yards

Top receivers

- KC – Travis Kelce 6 receptions, 106 yards, 2 TDs
- HOU – Nate Washington 6 receptions, 105 yards

Top tacklers

- KC – Derrick Johnson 8 tackles, 1 sack
- HOU – Brian Cushing 10 tackles

In the 2015 season opener, the Houston Texans took on the Kansas City Chiefs with Brian Hoyer in his first regular season start as the Texans' quarterback. Hoyer's first pass was intercepted which eventually led to a Kansas City touchdown. The Chiefs managed to score another 7 points off of turnovers to take a 14–0 lead with 4:28 left in the first. Houston finally managed to get on the board late in the 1st quarter following a 4-yard pass to DeAndre Hopkins from Hoyer. With Randy Bullock missing the extra point the Texans trailed 14–6 with 0:46 left in the 1st. Following another dismal quarter for the Texans, Kansas City led 27–9 at halftime. Houston managed to shut out the Chiefs for the entire second half and with almost 6 minutes left in the game brought Ryan Mallett in as quarterback, who led the team on two scoring drives. Nonetheless the Texans couldn't manage a comeback and fell to the Chiefs 27–20.

===== Game notes =====
This is the first time since 2009 where the Texans lost their season opener. Houston kicker Randy Bullock became the first player to miss a point-after attempt following a rule change for the 2015 season, which requires the ball to be snapped from the 15-yard line.

==== Week 2: at Carolina Panthers ====
Week Two: Houston Texans at Carolina Panthers – Game summary

Quarter	1	2	3	4	Total
Texans	3	0	7	7	17
Panthers	0	10	7	7	24

at Bank of America Stadium, Charlotte, North Carolina

- Date: September 20
- Game time: 1:00 p.m. EDT/12:00 p.m. CDT
- Game weather: 88 °F (31 °C), sunny
- Game attendance: 73,254
- Referee: Clete Blakeman
- TV announcers (CBS): Greg Gumbel, Trent Green and Jamie Erdahl
- Preview, Gamebook

Game information

First quarter

- HOU – 7:57 Randy Bullock 43 yard field goal HOU 3-0

Second quarter

- CAR – 11:22 Ted Ginn Jr. 25 yard pass from Cam Newton (Graham Gano kick) CAR 7-3
- CAR – 5:26 Graham Gano 28 yard field goal CAR 10-3

Third quarter

- HOU – 8:29 Garrett Graham 7 yard pass from Ryan Mallett (Randy Bullock kick) Tied 10-10
- CAR – 1:04 Cam Newton 2 yard run (Graham Gano kick) CAR 17-10

Fourth quarter

- CAR – 8:53 Corey Brown 36 yard pass from Cam Newton (Graham Gano kick) CAR 24-10
- HOU – 6:31 Ryan Mallett 6 yard run (Randy Bullock kick) CAR 24-17

Top passers

- HOU – Ryan Mallett 27/58, 244 yards, 1 TD, 1 INT
- CAR – Cam Newton 18/37, 195 yards, 2 TDs, 1 INT

Top rushers

- HOU – Chris Polk 14 carries, 38 yards
- CAR – Cam Newton 10 carries, 76 yards, 1 TD

Top receivers

- HOU – Nate Washington 3 receptions, 63 yards
- CAR – Greg Olsen 6 receptions, 70 yards

Top tacklers

- HOU – Quintin Demps 8 tackles, 0.5 sacks
- CAR – Kurt Coleman 9 tackles

Ryan Mallett was given the starting quarterback position against the Panthers. The Texans' only lead of the game came in the first quarter following a 43-yard field goal from Randy Bullock. Following 10 unanswered points from Carolina in the 2nd quarter, Houston trailed 3-10 going into halftime. Early in the third quarter Houston tied the game at 10 a piece. A Carolina touchdown late in the 3rd quarter and another early in the 4th sealed a Panthers victory as the Texans couldn't manage a comeback. With the loss Houston dropped to 0–2, their worst start since the 2008 season.

==== Week 3: vs. Tampa Bay Buccaneers ====
Week Three: Tampa Bay Buccaneers at Houston Texans – Game summary

Quarter	1	2	3	4	Total
Buccaneers	0	9	0	0	9
Texans	7	0	3	9	19

at NRG Stadium, Houston, Texas

- Date: September 27
- Game time: 12:00 p.m. CDT
- Game weather: Played indoors (retractable roof closed)
- Game attendance: 71,718
- Referee: Bill Vinovich
- TV announcers (Fox): Kenny Albert, Daryl Johnston and Holly Sonders
- Recap, Gamebook

Game information

First quarter

- HOU 4:58 – DeAndre Hopkins 5 yard pass from Ryan Mallett (Randy Bullock kick) HOU 7-0

Second quarter

- TB 11:20 – Kyle Brindza 58 yard field goal HOU 7-3
- TB 3:51 – Charles Sims 32 yard pass from Jameis Winston TB 9-7

Third quarter

- HOU 12:42 – Randy Bullock 39 yard field goal HOU 10-9

Fourth quarter

- HOU 9:19 – Alfred Blue 20 yard rush HOU 16-9
- HOU 1:12 – Randy Bullock 19 yard field goal HOU 19-9

Top passers

- TB – Jameis Winston 17/36, 261 yards, 1 TD, 1 INT
- HOU – Ryan Mallett 24/39, 228 yards, 1 TD, 1 INT

Top rushers

- TB – Doug Martin 14 carries, 46 yards
- HOU – Alfred Blue 31 carries, 139 yards, 1 TD

Top receivers

- TB – Mike Evans 7 receptions, 101 yards
- HOU – DeAndre Hopkins 8 receptions, 101 yards, 1 TD

Top tacklers

- TB – Lavonte David 15 tackles, 12 assists
- HOU – Kareem Jackson 6 tackles

The Texans hosted the 1-1 Buccaneers at home, looking for their first win of the 2015 season. Both Houston and Tampa Bay punted the ball on their first possession, before Houston scored first with Ryan Mallett connecting with DeAndre Hopkins for a 5-yard touchdown pass. With Randy Bullock's extra point good, the Texans took a 7–0 lead with 4:58 left in the first quarter. Tampa Bay managed to get on the board with their first possession of the 2nd quarter, with Kyle Brindza making a 58 yard long field goal to trail 3–7. Both teams punted on their next possession, with the Texans committing the first turnover of the day with a Ryan Mallett pass being intercepted by Kwon Alexander. The Buccaneers capitalized on the turnover in just 50 seconds, with Jameis Winston throwing a 32-yard pass to Charles Sims. With Brindza missing the extra point, Tampa Bay led Houston 9–7 with 3:51 left in the half. Receiving the ball back, Bullock missed a 43-yard field goal.

Tampa Bay received the ball to start the 2nd half, however Winston threw an interception that was caught by Quintin Demps. The Texans settled for 3 points off the turnover with Bullock making a 34-yard field goal. The kicking problems continued for the Buccaneers after Brindza missed a 41-yard field goal with 7:21 left in the 3rd, then again from 33 yards with 10:56 left to play. Following another missed field goal for Tampa Bay, Houston went 77 yards in just 5 plays to score a touchdown with an Alfred Blue 20 yard rush. With Bullock missing his 2nd extra point attempt of the season, the Texans extended their lead to 16–9 with 9:19 left to play. The Texans extended their lead with a 19-yard field goal from Bullock to lead 19–9 with 1:15 left to play. With Brindza missing his 3rd field goal of the day (this time from 57 yards), the Texans held on to secure their first win of the season. The Buccaneers were completely shut out during the second half while the Texans scored 12 unanswered points.

==== Week 4: at Atlanta Falcons ====
Week Four: Houston Texans at Atlanta Falcons – Game summary

Quarter	1	2	3	4	Total
Texans	0	0	0	21	21
Falcons	7	21	14	6	48

at Georgia Dome, Atlanta, Georgia

- Date: October 4
- Game time: 1:00 p.m. EDT/12:00 p.m. CDT
- Game weather: Played indoors (dome stadium)
- Game attendance: 69,904
- Referee: Carl Cheffers
- TV announcers (CBS): Kevin Harlan and Rich Gannon
- Recap, Gamebook

Game information

First quarter

- ATL 8:32 – Devonta Freeman 16 yard run (Matt Bryant kick) ATL 7-0

Second quarter

- ATL 14:39 – Devonta Freeman 23 yard run (Matt Bryant kick) ATL 14-0
- ATL 12:24 – Desmond Trufant 24 yard fumble return (Matt Bryant kick) ATL 21-0
- ATL 3:11 – Leonard Hankerson 3 yard pass from Matt Ryan (Matt Bryant kick) ATL 28-0

Third quarter

- ATL 10:50 – Devonta Freeman 6 yard run (Matt Bryant kick) ATL 35-0
- ATL 2:56 – Terron Ward 8 yard run (Matt Bryant kick) ATL 42-0

Fourth quarter

- HOU 14:22 – C. J. Fiedorowicz 5 yard pass from Brian Hoyer (Nick Novak kick) ATL 42-7
- HOU 9:09 – Chris Polk 1 yard run (Nick Novak kick) ATL 42-14
- HOU 3:01 – Cecil Shorts III 8 yard pass from Brian Hoyer (Nick Novak kick) ATL 42-21
- ATL 0:00 – Nathan Stupar 84 yard fumble return ATL 48-21

Top passers

- HOU – Brian Hoyer 17/30, 232 yards, 2 TDs
- ATL – Matt Ryan 19/27, 256 yards, 1 TD

Top rushers

- HOU – Chris Polk 3 car, 27 yards, 1 TD
- ATL – Terron Ward 19 car, 72 yards, 1 TD

Top receivers

- HOU – DeAndre Hopkins 9 receptions, 157 yards
- ATL – Leonard Hankerson 6 receptions, 103 yards, 1 TD

Top tacklers

- HOU – Brian Cushing 11 tackles, 7 assists
- ATL - Nathan Stupar 6 tackles, 1 TD

Ryan Mallett was named the starting quarterback for the 3rd straight game of the 2015 season for Houston. After a dismal 1st half, the Falcons led the Texans 28–0. In the fourth quarter with the Texans trailing 42–0, Mallett was pulled in favor of Brian Hoyer. Hoyer immediately performed better, passing for 2 touchdowns. However, to add insult to injury on what was already a bad day, with 1 second left to play on 4th and goal, Houston fumbled the ball with Nathan Stupar recovering it for an 84-yard touchdown. Taking the knee on a two-point conversion, the Falcons finished with a 48–21 victory.

With the disappointing loss, the Texans fell to 1–3.

==== Week 5: vs. Indianapolis Colts ====
Week Five: Indianapolis Colts at Houston Texans – Game summary

Quarter	1	2	3	4	Total
Colts	10	3	7	7	27
Texans	0	10	7	3	20

at NRG Stadium, Houston, Texas

- Date: October 8
- Game time: 7:25 p.m. CDT
- Game weather: Played indoors (retractable roof closed)
- Game attendance: 71,732
- Referee: Terry McAulay
- TV announcers (CBS/NFLN): Jim Nantz, Phil Simms and Tracy Wolfson
- Recap, Gamebook

Game information

First quarter

- IND 6:32 – Adam Vinatieri 48-yard field goal IND 3–0
- IND 1:27 – Andre Johnson 4-yard pass from Matt Hasselbeck (Adam Vinatieri kick) IND 10-0

Second quarter

- IND 7:41 – Adam Vinatieri 42-yard field goal IND 13-0
- HOU 2:08 – Nick Novak 36-yard field goal IND 13-3
- HOU 0:00 – Jaelen Strong 42-yard pass from Brian Hoyer (Nick Novak kick) IND 13-10

Third quarter

- IND 13:02 – Frank Gore 3-yard rush (Adam Vinatieri kick) IND 20-10
- HOU 4:03 – Jaelen Strong 11-yard pass from Brian Hoyer (Nick Novak kick) IND 20-17

Fourth quarter

- IND 10:28 – Andre Johnson 2-yard pass from Matt Hasselbeck (Adam Vinatieri kick) IND 27-17
- HOU 6:07 – Nick Novak 49-yard field goal IND 27–20

Top passers

- IND – Matt Hasselbeck 18/29, 213 yards, 2 TDs
- HOU – Brian Hoyer 24/31, 312 yards, 2 TDs, 1 INT

Top rushers

- IND – Frank Gore 22 carries, 98 yards, 1 TD
- HOU – Arian Foster 19 carries, 41 yards

Top receivers

- IND – T. Y. Hilton 5 receptions, 88 yards
- HOU – DeAndre Hopkins 11 receptions, 169 yards

Top tacklers

- IND – D'Qwell Jackson 11 tackles, 3 assists
- HOU – Brian Cushing 8 tackles

Despite a dismal performance four days earlier, Ryan Mallett was named the starter for the Texans. On the other side, Andrew Luck was inactive for the second week in a row, nursing a shoulder injury. Despite suffering from a viral infection, Matt Hasselbeck was named the starting quarterback for the Colts.

Off to a promising start, Houston turned over the ball inside the red zone after a Mallett pass to Arian Foster was tipped and caught by Mike Adams. Indianapolis capitalized on the turnover with a 48-yard field goal from Adam Vinatieri to take a 3–0 lead with 6:32 left in the 1st. The Colts further extended their lead with a 4-yard pass from Hasselbeck to former Texan Andre Johnson to lead 10–0 with 1:27 left in the first. Ending the 1st quarter, Houston trailed 0–10 with the ball on their own 34.

On their second play of the 2nd quarter, the Texans punted the ball away on 4th and 1. Houston caught a break following a chop-block penalty against Frank Gore that made it 1st and 25 for Indianapolis near midfield. On 3rd and 22 a roughing the passer call against J. J. Watt gave the Colts a 1st down that put them in the red zone. On 3rd down Hasselbeck threw to T. Y. Hilton, who dropped the ball for an incomplete pass. After the play, Indianapolis head coach Chuck Pagano drew a 15-yard penalty after rushing the field. After a series of penalties, the Colts settled for a 42-yard Vinatieri field goal to lead 13–0 with 7:41 remaining in the half. A roughing the passer call against the Colts gave the Texans an automatic 1st down on what would have been 3rd down. After Mallett was slow to get up, Brian Hoyer came in at the quarterback position. On 3rd and 10 Hoyer picked up the 1st down passing 24 yards to DeAndre Hopkins. Hoyer connected with Hopkins once again to pick up a long 1st down conversion to put the Texans in the red zone. A chop block penalty pushed Houston back to the 31 for a 2nd and 21. Houston finally got on the board with a 36-yard field goal from Nick Novak to trail 3–13 with 2:08 left in the first half. With no timeouts left, Hoyer completed a 95-yard drive with a 42-yard Hail Mary pass to Jaelen Strong to trail 9-13. With Novak's kick good, Houston trailed Indianapolis 10-13 going into halftime.

Receiving the ball to start off the first half, the Colts quickly marched down field to score a touchdown on the opening play. With 13:02 left in the 3rd, Indianapolis extended their lead to 20–10. The Texans were not as lucky as an offensive pass-interference call against Hopkins put Houston into a three-and-out. On the Colts' next possession Houston's defense forced them into their first 3-and-out of the night. On the Texans' next possession Hoyer connected with Strong once again for a touchdown. With Novak making the extra point, Houston trailed 17–20 with 4:03 left in the 3rd. Making their first 3rd conversion of the night, the Colts continued to march down the field to hold their 20–17 lead at the end of the 3rd.

With a face-mask penalty called against Jadeveon Clowney, the Colts came closer to the Houston red zone. However, on the next play an offside penalty was called against Indianapolis. An interception was over-called following a holding penalty against Houston. On the next play the Texans were penalized again with a pass interference call against Kareem Jackson, making it 1st and goal from the Houston 1 for the Colts. Hasselbeck connected with Johnson to make it 26–17. With Vinatieri making the extra point, Indianapolis extended their lead to 27–17 with 10:28 left to play. Receiving the ball, Foster gained 32 yards to put Houston into Indianapolis territory, keeping hopes of a comeback alive. The Texans ended the drive with a 49-yard field goal from Novak to trail 20–27 with 6:07 left to play. Houston kicked the ball back to Indianapolis, who took the touchback. The Colts punted the ball back with 3:39 left to play, with the Texans returning it to their own 36. By the 2-minute warning Houston had reached Indianapolis territory at the Colts' 38. On the play following the 2 minute warning, Hoyer threw an interception that was picked off by Adams. Indianapolis held onto the ball and ran the clock out to win, 27–20.

==== Week 6: at Jacksonville Jaguars ====
Week Six: Houston Texans at Jacksonville Jaguars – Game summary

Quarter	1	2	3	4	Total
Texans	7	3	0	21	31
Jaguars	0	7	7	6	20

at EverBank Field, Jacksonville, Florida

- Date: October 18
- Game time: 1:00 p.m. EDT/12:00 p.m. CDT
- Game weather: 73 °F (23 °C), no chance of rain
- Game attendance: 58,085
- Referee: Brad Allen
- TV announcers (CBS): Tom McCarthy and Adam Archuleta
- Recap, Gamebook

Game information

First quarter

- HOU 1:36 – Arian Foster 14 yard pass from Brian Hoyer (Nick Novak kick) HOU 7-0

Second quarter

- JAX 9:41 – Allen Robinson 2 yard pass from Blake Bortles (Jason Myers kick) tied 7-7
- HOU 6:46 – Nick Novak 41 yard field goal HOU 10-7

Third quarter

- JAX 0:10 – Julius Thomas 29 yard pass from Blake Bortles (Jason Myers kick) JAX 14-10

Fourth quarter

- HOU 11:20 – DeAndre Hopkins 9 yard pass from Brian Hoyer (Nick Novak kick) HOU 17-14
- HOU 8:07 – DeAndre Hopkins 26 yard pass from Brian Hoyer (Nick Novak kick) HOU 24-14
- HOU 7:55 – Andre Hal 31 yard interception return (Nick Novak kick) HOU 31-14
- JAX 4:32 – Allen Hurns 11 yard pass from Blake Bortles HOU 31-20

Top passers

- HOU – Brian Hoyer 24/36, 293 yards, 3 TDs
- JAX – Blake Bortles 30/53, 331 yards, 3 TDs, 3 INTs

Top rushers

- HOU – Arian Foster 18 carries, 53 yards
- JAX – Blake Bortles 4 carries, 37 yards

Top receivers

- HOU – DeAndre Hopkins 10 receptions, 148 yards, 2 TDs
- JAX – Bryan Walters 8 receptions, 87 yards

Top tacklers

- HOU – Brian Cushing 9 solo tackles, 3 assists
- JAX – Paul Posluszny 9 solo tackles, 1 assist

After both teams punted the ball on their first possession, Houston started their 2nd drive from their own 1 yard line. The Texans finished the drive with Brian Hoyer throwing 14 yards to Arian Foster for a touchdown. With Nick Novak making the extra point, the Texans took a 7–0 lead with 1:36 left in the 1st. Jacksonville got their first score of the day with Blake Bortles passing 2 yards to Allen Robinson for a touchdown. With Jason Myers making the extra point, the Texans and Jaguars were tied 7–7 with 9:41 left in the 2nd. Houston responded on their next possession with Novak making a 41-yard field goal to take a 10–7 lead. With just ten seconds left in the first half, Bortles threw an interception that was caught by Andre Hal inside the red zone. Leading 10–7 at the half, the Texans had their first halftime lead of the 2015 season.

Jacksonville received the ball to start out the 2nd half, with the Houston defense forcing a three-and-out. Both teams' offenses were relatively quiet throughout the 3rd quarter, with the only scoring play coming late with 10 seconds left. Bortles connected with Julius Thomas for a 29-yard touchdown pass. With Myers making the extra point, Jacksonville took a 14–10 lead going into the 4th. After Hoyer took a hard hit and was slow to get up, Ryan Mallett played a snap, before Hoyer came back in. 2 plays after coming back in, Hoyer threw a 9-yard pass to DeAndre Hopkins for a touchdown. With Novak's kick good, the Texans took a 17–14 lead. Houston extended their lead on their next possession with Hoyer throwing 26 yards to Hopkins for another touchdown. On Jacksonville's next possession, Howe caught another interception and returned it for a touchdown. With the pick-six, the Texans scored 21 unanswered points in the 4th quarter in just over 7 minutes. The Jaguars scored on an Allen Hurns 11 yard pass from Bortles. With Myers missing the extra point, Jacksonville trailed 20–31 with 4:32 left to play. The Jaguars kicked an onside kick and recovered it, however an offside penalty forced the kick to be tried again. On the second attempt, the kick went out of bounds, drawing another penalty. Houston declined the penalty and took possession of the ball. The Jaguars couldn't manage the comeback and Houston won 31–20, improving to 2–4.

==== Week 7: at Miami Dolphins ====
Week Seven: Houston Texans at Miami Dolphins – Game summary

Quarter	1	2	3	4	Total
Texans	0	0	13	13	26
Dolphins	21	20	0	3	44

at Sun Life Stadium, Miami Gardens, Florida

- Date: October 25
- Game time: 1:00 p.m. EDT/12:00 p.m. CDT
- Game weather: 84 °F (29 °C), cloudy
- Game attendance: 65,251
- Referee: John Hussey
- TV announcers (CBS): Spero Dedes and Solomon Wilcots
- Recap, Gamebook

Game information

First quarter

- MIA 10:57 – Rishard Matthews 53 yard pass from Ryan Tannehill (Andrew Franks kick) MIA 7-0 6 plays, 88 yards, 2:54
- MIA 6:45 – Jarvis Landry 50 yard pass from Ryan Tannehill (Andrew Franks kick) MIA 14-0 1 play, 50 yards, 0:15
- MIA 3:11 – Jarvis Landry 10 yard pass from Ryan Tannehill (Andrew Franks kick) MIA 21-0 4 plays, 45 yards, 2:07

Second quarter

- MIA 14:10 – Lamar Miller 54 yard pass from Ryan Tannehill (Andrew Franks kick) MIA 28-0 6 plays, 83 yards, 2:50
- MIA 13:56 – Reshad Jones 23 yard interception return (Andrew Franks kick) MIA 35-0 1 play, 23 yards, 0:14
- MIA 2:47 – Lamar Miller 85 yard run MIA 41-0 2 plays, 91 yards, 0:43

Third quarter

- HOU 8:13 – Arian Foster 7 yard pass from Brian Hoyer MIA 41-6 4 plays, 31 yards, 0:59
- HOU 1:45 – Arian Foster 2 yard run (Nick Novak kick) MIA 41-13 8 plays, 82 yards, 3:56

Fourth quarter

- HOU 11:27 – Nate Washington 27 yard pass from Brian Hoyer (Nick Novak kick) MIA 41-20 8 plays, 63 yards, 2:37
- MIA 7:46 – Andrew Franks 53 yard field goal MIA 44-20 7 plays, 45 yards, 3:46
- HOU 4:00 – Nate Washington 5 yard pass from Brian Hoyer MIA 44-26 12 plays, 80 yards, 3:41

Top passers

- HOU – Brian Hoyer 23/49, 273 yards, 3 TDs, 1 INT
- MIA – Ryan Tannehill 18/19, 282 yards, 4 TDs

Top rushers

- HOU – Arian Foster 18 carries, 59 yards, 1 TD
- MIA – Lamar Miller 14 carries, 175 yards, 1 TD

Top receivers

- HOU – Nate Washington 9 receptions, 127 yards, 2 TDs
- MIA – Jarvis Landry 5 receptions, 83 yards, 2 TDs

Top tacklers

- HOU – Jadeveon Clowney 8 tackles, 1 sack
- MIA – Reshad Jones 8 tackles, 1 INT, 1 TD

The Texans' offense was forced into five consecutive three-and-outs in the 1st quarter, while the Dolphins' offense scored three passing touchdowns, two of which came from at least 50 yards. After a lopsided first quarter, the Texans trailed the Dolphins 0-21. The 2nd quarter didn't start off any better for Houston, with Ryan Tannehill connecting with Lamar Miller for a 54-yard touchdown reception. With Andrew Franks making the extra point, Miami extended their lead to 28–0. The Texans sunk even lower on their next possession, with a Brian Hoyer pass being intercepted by Reshad Jones, who returned it for a touchdown. With the pick-six, the Dolphins further extended their lead to 35-0 early in the 2nd. With 7:45 left in the 2nd quarter, the Texans finally picked up their first 1st down. Finally getting into the redzone for the first time of the day, Houston turned the ball over on downs on 4th and 2. Miami answered with an 85-yard rush from Miller to extend their lead to 41–0. The score stuck going into halftime, with the Texans facing their largest halftime deficit in franchise history.

Early in the 3rd quarter, Miami fumbled the ball which was recovered by Houston defender Johnathan Joseph. The fumble recovery set up the Texans' first score of the day, with Hoyer connecting with Arian Foster. With Nick Novak missing the extra point, Houston trailed Miami 6–41 with 8:13 left in the 3rd. Foster scored again late in the 3rd, this time with a 2-yard rush. With Novak's kick good, the Texans trailed 13–41 with 1:45 left in the 3rd quarter. Houston scored again early in the 4th quarter, with Hoyer connecting with Nate Washington for a 27-yard touchdown pass. With Novak's kick good, the Texans trailed 20-41 after scoring 20 unanswered points. Miami got their first points of the 2nd half midway through the 4th, with Franks making a 53-yard field. The field goal extended the Dolphins' lead to 44–20 with 7:46 left to play. Hoyer found Washington again for a 5-yard touchdown pass. With the 2-point conversion no good, the Texans trailed 26–44 with 4:00 left to play. The Texans fell to the Dolphins 44–26, their first loss to the Dolphins in franchise history. With the loss, Houston dropped to 2–5 on the season.

===== Game notes =====
Arian Foster left the game with an Achilles tear in the 4th quarter; it was later announced that Foster would miss the rest of the season. Backup quarterback Ryan Mallett was cut from the team 2 days after the game. Mallett had missed the team's charter flight to the game and was late to a team meeting the day before. Former Texans backing quarterback T. J. Yates was named as Mallet's replacement.

==== Week 8: vs. Tennessee Titans ====
Week Eight: Tennessee Titans at Houston Texans – Game summary

Quarter	1	2	3	4	Total
Titans	3	0	3	0	6
Texans	0	10	7	3	20

at NRG Stadium, Houston, Texas

- Date: November 1
- Game time: 12:00 p.m. CST
- Game weather: Played indoors (retractable roof closed)
- Game attendance: 71,630
- Referee: Clete Blakeman
- TV announcers (CBS): Spero Dedes and Solomon Wilcots
- Recap, Gamebook

Game information

First quarter

- TEN 9:05 – Ryan Succop 35 yard field goal TEN 3-0

Second quarter

- HOU 14:14 – DeAndre Hopkins 21 yard pass from Brian Hoyer (Nick Novak kick) HOU 7-3
- HOU 11:39 – Nick Novak 38 yard field goal HOU 10-3

Third quarter

- TEN 5:58 – Ryan Succop 44 yard field goal HOU 10-6
- HOU 3:38 – Nate Washington 42 yard pass from Brian Hoyer (Nick Novak kick) HOU 17-6

Fourth quarter

- HOU 12:37 – Nick Novak 24 yard field goal HOU 20-6

Top passers

- TEN – Zach Mettenberger 22/31, 171 yards, 1 INT
- HOU – Brian Hoyer 22/35, 235 yards, 2 TDs

Top rushers

- TEN – Antonio Andrews 16 carries, 64 yards
- HOU – Alfred Blue 14 carries, 39 yards

Top receivers

- TEN – Delanie Walker 6 receptions, 62 yards
- HOU – DeAndre Hopkins 8 receptions, 94 yards, 1 TD

Top tacklers

- TEN – Michael Griffin 9 tackles
- HOU – Brian Cushing 13 tackles

After a humiliating defeat a week before against the Dolphins, the Texans' defense looked much better holding the Titans to just a field goal in the 1st quarter. Houston's offense scored a touchdown early in the 2nd quarter to take a 7–3 lead. On the ensuing kickoff, Tennessee's Bishop Sankey fumbled the ball with Kurtis Drummond recovering it for Houston. The Texans settled for 3 off the turnover with a 38-yard field goal from Nick Novak. Late in the 3rd quarter Brian Hoyer connected with former Titan Nate Washington for a 42-yard touchdown pass, extending the Texans' lead to 17–6 with Novak making the PAT. To start out the 4th quarter, Kevin Johnson got his first career interception by picking off a Zach Mettenberger pass. Houston failed to capitalized on the turnover, however Tennessee turned the ball over after a J. J. Watt sack, giving the Texans the ball at the Titans' 10-yard line. The Texans scored another 3 points off of the turnover, with Novak making a 24-yard field goal. Houston defeated Tennessee 20-6 and improved to 3–5. Watt, Whitney Mercilus and Jared Crick combined for a total of 6 sacks for the Texans' defense.

==== Week 10: at Cincinnati Bengals ====
Week Ten: Houston Texans at Cincinnati Bengals – Game summary

Quarter	1	2	3	4	Total
Texans	0	3	0	7	10
Bengals	3	3	0	0	6

at Paul Brown Stadium, Cincinnati, Ohio

- Date: November 16
- Game time: 8:30 p.m. EST/7:30 p.m. CST
- Game weather: 53 °F (12 °C), light showers
- Game attendance: 61,381
- Referee: Walt Coleman
- TV announcers (ESPN): Mike Tirico, Jon Gruden and Lisa Salters
- Recap, Gamebook

Game information

First quarter

- CIN 1:33 – Mike Nugent 42 yard field goal CIN 3-0

Second quarter

- HOU 12:16 – Nick Novak 22 yard field goal tied 3-3
- CIN 5:31 – Mike Nugent 39 yard field goal CIN 6-3

Third quarter

- No scoring plays

Fourth quarter

- HOU 14:20 – DeAndre Hopkins 22 yard pass from T. J. Yates (Nick Novak kick) HOU 10-6

Top passers

- HOU – Brian Hoyer 12/22, 123 yards, 1 INT
- CIN – Andy Dalton 22/38, 197 yards, 1 INT

Top rushers

- HOU – Jonathan Grimes 6 carries, 33 yards
- CIN – Giovani Bernard 8 carries, 36 yards

Top receivers

- HOU – DeAndre Hopkins 5 receptions, 57 yards, 1 TD
- CIN – A. J. Green 5 receptions, 67 yards, 1 fumble

Top tacklers

- HOU – Benardrick McKinney 9 tackles
- CIN – George Iloka 8 tackles

The game started off as a defensive battle for both teams with the first score of the game coming late in the 1st quarter. The Bengals originally went for a 32-yard field goal, but a holding penalty made it a 42-yard attempt for Mike Nugent. With the kick good, Cincinnati took a 3–0 lead with 1:33 left in the 1st. The Texans responded on their next possession with a 22-yard field goal from Nick Novak early in the 2nd to tie the game 3-3. To close out the first half, a Hail Mary pass by Texans' quarterback Brian Hoyer was intercepted in the end zone for no return. In a defensive first half, the Bengals led 6–3 at halftime. Hoyer left the game late in the 3rd quarter to be checked for a possible concussion; with Hoyer leaving T. J. Yates played his first snap for the Texans since 2013. The Texans scored the first—and only—touchdown of the game early in the 4th quarter with Yates throwing 22 yards to DeAndre Hopkins. With Novak making the PAT, the Texans took a 10–6 lead with 14:20 left to play. In the end, the Texans held on to upset the Bengals 10–6, handing the Bengals their first loss of the season.

==== Week 11: vs. New York Jets ====
Week Eleven: New York Jets at Houston Texans – Game summary

Quarter	1	2	3	4	Total
Jets	0	3	7	7	17
Texans	0	10	14	0	24

at NRG Stadium, Houston, Texas

- Date: November 22
- Game time: 12:00 p.m. CST
- Game weather: Played indoors (retractable roof closed)
- Referee: John Parry
- TV announcers (CBS): Kevin Harlan and Rich Gannon
- Recap, Gamebook

Game information

First quarter

- No scoring plays

Second quarter

- HOU 14:53 – Nick Novak 20 yard field goal HOU 3-0
- NYJ 8:21 – Randy Bullock 40 yard field goal tied 3-3
- HOU 3:04 – DeAndre Hopkins 61 yard pass from T. J. Yates (Nick Novak kick) HOU 10-3

Third quarter

- NYJ 11:23 – Brandon Marshall 21 yard pass from Ryan Fitzpatrick (Randy Bullock kick) tied 10-10
- HOU 7:51 – Alfred Blue 21 yard pass from Cecil Shorts III (Nick Novak kick) HOU 17-10
- HOU 3:24 – DeAndre Hopkins 20 yard pass from T. J. Yates (Nick Novak kick) HOU 24-10

Fourth quarter

- NYJ 4:20 – Ryan Fitzpatrick 6 yard run (Randy Bullock kick) HOU 24-17

Top passers

- NYJ – Ryan Fitzpatrick 19/39, 216 yards, 1 TD, 2 INTs
- HOU – T. J. Yates 16/34, 229 yards, 2 TDs

Top rushers

- NYJ – Chris Ivory 8 carries, 36 yards
- HOU – Alfred Blue 21 carries, 58 yards

Top receivers

- NYJ – Eric Decker 4 receptions, 81 yards
- HOU – DeAndre Hopkins 5 receptions, 118 yards, 2 TDs

Top tacklers

- NYJ – Damon Harrison 12 tackles
- HOU – J. J. Watt 8 tackles, 2 sacks

T. J. Yates was named the starter for the Texans as Brian Hoyer was out due to a concussion, while former Texans Ryan Fitzpatrick and Randy Bullock made their first return to Houston since leaving the team. During the 3rd quarter, wide receiver Cecil Shorts III threw a 21-yard touchdown pass to running back Alfred Blue to put the Texans up 17–10 with Nick Novak making the extra-point. Despite losing their starting quarterback, Houston beat the Jets 24–17, extending their winning streak to a season best 3 games, their first 3-game winning streak since the 2012 season. It was their first home victory against the Jets in three tries.

==== Week 12: vs. New Orleans Saints ====
Week Twelve: New Orleans Saints at Houston Texans – Game summary

Quarter	1	2	3	4	Total
Saints	0	6	0	0	6
Texans	14	0	10	0	24

at NRG Stadium, Houston, Texas

- Date: November 29
- Game time: 12:00 p.m. CST
- Game weather: 54 °F (12 °C), cloudy
- Game attendance: 71,778
- Referee: John Hussey
- TV announcers (Fox): Joe Davis, David Diehl and Kristina Pink
- Recap, Gamebook

Game information

First quarter

- HOU 6:57 – Ryan Griffin 10 yard pass from Brian Hoyer (Nick Novak kick) HOU 7-0
- HOU 1:29 – Cecil Shorts III 3 yard pass from Brian Hoyer (Nick Novak kick) HOU 14-0

Second quarter

- NO 6:31 – Kai Forbath 30 yard field goal HOU 14-3
- NO 1:12 – Kai Forbath 57 yard field goal HOU 14-6

Third quarter

- HOU 11:28 – Alfred Blue 8 yard run (Nick Novak kick) HOU 21-6
- HOU 6:05 – Nick Novak 34 yard field goal HOU 24-6

Fourth quarter

- No scoring plays

Top passers

- NO – Drew Brees 25/44, 228 yards, 1 INT
- HOU – Brian Hoyer 21/27, 205 yards, 2 TDs, 1 INT

Top rushers

- NO – Mark Ingram II 9 carries, 52 yards
- HOU – Alfred Blue 16 carries, 77 yards, 1 TD

Top receivers

- NO – Benjamin Watson 4 receptions, 53 yards
- HOU – Ryan Griffin 4 receptions, 72 yards, 1 TD

Top tacklers

- NO – Kenny Vaccaro 13 tackles
- HOU – Johnathan Joseph 7 tackles

The Texans beat the Saints 24–6, extending their winning streak to 4 games. With the win, Houston went to 6–5 for their first winning record of the season and they finished 2-2 against the NFC South. The Texans' defense didn't allow a single touchdown for New Orleans, the first time the team failed to score a touchdown since December 24, 2005.

==== Week 13: at Buffalo Bills ====
Week Thirteen: Houston Texans at Buffalo Bills – Game summary

Quarter	1	2	3	4	Total
Texans	6	7	0	8	21
Bills	7	14	0	9	30

at Ralph Wilson Stadium, Orchard Park, New York

- Date: December 6
- Game time: 1:00 p.m. EST/12:00 p.m. CST
- Game weather: 47 °F (8 °C), partly cloudy
- Game attendance: 68,544
- Referee: Tony Corrente
- TV announcers (CBS): Spero Dedes and Solomon Wilcots
- Recap, Gamebook

Game information

First quarter

- BUF 9:37 – Sammy Watkins 3 yard pass from Tyrod Taylor (Dan Carpenter kick) BUF 7–0
- HOU 3:58 – Ryan Griffin 8 yard pass from Brian Hoyer BUF 7–6

Second quarter

- BUF 14:53 – Tyrod Taylor 8 yard run (Dan Carpenter kick) BUF 14–6
- HOU 3:57 – Chris Polk 11 yard pass from Brian Hoyer (Nick Novak kick) BUF 14–13
- BUF 0:30 – Robert Woods 2 yard pass from Tyrod Taylor (Dan Carpenter kick) BUF 21–13

Third quarter

- No scoring plays

Fourth quarter

- HOU 9:12 – DeAndre Hopkins 19 yard pass from Brian Hoyer (Jonathan Grimes run for two-point conversion) tied 21–21
- BUF 1:53 – Charles Clay 40 yard pass from Tyrod Taylor BUF 27–21
- BUF 0:33 – Dan Carpenter 36 yard field goal BUF 30–21

Top passers

- HOU – Brian Hoyer 26/43, 293 yards, 3 TDs, 1 INT
- BUF – Tyrod Taylor 11/21, 211 yards, 3 TDs

Top rushers

- HOU – Chris Polk 12 carries, 61 yards
- BUF – LeSean McCoy 21 carries, 112 yards

Top receivers

- HOU – Cecil Shorts III 6 receptions, 91 yards
- BUF – Sammy Watkins 3 receptions, 109 yards, 1 TD

Top tacklers

- HOU – Kareem Jackson 6 tackles
- BUF – Preston Brown 9 tackles

The Texans' defense was unable to withstand the Bills' rushing offense, especially in the first half, allowing over 100 rushing yards. Nonetheless, Houston managed to keep pace throughout despite not leading all game, but gave up a go-ahead touchdown by Charles Clay on the first play off the two-minute warning, followed by Dan Carpenter's 30-yard field goal to put it away for good. The Texans lost their first game following the bye week losing to Buffalo 21–30 and dropped to 6–6 on the season. This was also Houston's first loss to the Bills since 2006.

==== Week 14: vs. New England Patriots ====
Battle Red Day

Week Fourteen: New England Patriots at Houston Texans – Game summary

Quarter	1	2	3	4	Total
Patriots	7	10	3	7	27
Texans	3	3	0	0	6

at NRG Stadium, Houston, Texas

- Date: December 13
- Game time: 7:30 p.m. CST
- Game weather: Played indoors (retractable roof closed)
- Game attendance: 71,908
- Referee: Jeff Triplette
- TV announcers (NBC): Al Michaels, Cris Collinsworth and Michele Tafoya
- Preview, Gamebook

Game information

First quarter

- NE 7:22 – Keshawn Martin 2 yard pass from Tom Brady (Stephen Gostkowski kick) NE 7–0
- HOU 2:38 – Nick Novak 37 yard field goal NE 7–3

Second quarter

- NE 12:13 – Stephen Gostkowski 43 yard field goal NE 10–3
- HOU 9:26 – Nick Novak 45 yard field goal NE 10–6
- NE 0:14 – Rob Gronkowski 1 yard pass from Tom Brady (Stephen Gostkowski kick) NE 17–6

Third quarter

- NE 11:48 – Stephen Gostkowski 49 yard field goal NE 20–6

Fourth quarter

- NE 12:04 – James White 2 yard run (Stephen Gostkowski kick) NE 27–6

Top passers

- NE – Tom Brady 22/30, 226 yards, 2 TDs
- HOU – Brian Hoyer 11/22, 155 yards

Top rushers

- NE – LeGarrette Blount 10 carries, 53 yards
- HOU – Jonathan Grimes 7 carries, 53 yards

Top receivers

- NE – Rob Gronkowski 4 receptions, 87 yards, 1 TD
- HOU – DeAndre Hopkins 3 receptions, 52 yards

Top tacklers

- NE – Jamie Collins 9 tackles, 1 tackle for loss
- HOU – Benardrick McKinney 10 tackles

The Texans and Patriots faced off on Sunday Night Football in a game with playoff implications for both teams. Houston received the opening kickoff, going into a three-and-out on the drive. On New England's second drive, Tom Brady found tight end Rob Gronkowski for a 40-yard reception to set up first and goal. To end the drive, Brady found Keshawn Martin for a 2-yard touchdown pass. With Stephen Gostkowski making the extra point the Patriots took a 7–0 lead. On 3rd and 18, Brian Hoyer found Nate Washington for a 49-yard pass to put Houston at New England's 25 yard line. The Texans ended the drive with a 37-yard field goal from Nick Novak to trail 3–7 late in the 1st quarter. The Patriots extended their lead early in the 2nd quarter to 10–3 with a 43-yard field goal from Stephen Gostkowski. After struggling to find their run game after the loss of Arian Foster, Jonathan Grimes took off for 37 yards to put the Texans at the Patriots' 43 yard line. The drive ended with another Novak field goal, this time from 45 yards. With Novak's kick good, Houston trailed 6–10 with 9:26 left in the half. To close out the first half, Tom Brady found Gronkowski for a 1-yard touchdown pass. With Gostkowski making the extra point New England extended their lead to 17–6 going into halftime.

The Texans failed to score in the 2nd half, falling to the Patriots 27–6. Hoyer left the game late in the 4th quarter due to a possible concussion, with T. J. Yates coming in as the starting quarterback. With the loss, Houston finished 1-3 against the AFC East.

==== Week 15: at Indianapolis Colts ====
Week Fifteen: Houston Texans at Indianapolis Colts – Game summary

Quarter	1	2	3	4	Total
Texans	0	3	3	10	16
Colts	0	10	0	0	10

at Lucas Oil Stadium, Indianapolis, Indiana

- Date: December 20
- Game time: 1:00 p.m. EST/12:00 p.m. CST
- Game weather: Played indoors (retractable roof closed)
- Game attendance: 66,083
- Referee: Ed Hochuli
- TV announcers (CBS): Greg Gumbel, Trent Green and Jamie Erdahl
- Recap, Gamebook

Game information

First quarter

- No scoring plays

Second quarter

- IND 14:50 – Donte Moncrief 11 yard pass from Matt Hasselbeck (Adam Vinatieri kick) IND 7–0
- IND 6:12 – Adam Vinatieri 29 yard field goal IND 10–0
- HOU 0:00 – Nick Novak 22 yard field goal IND 10–3

Third quarter

- HOU 2:42 – Nick Novak 46 yard field goal IND 10–6

Fourth quarter

- HOU 10:36 – Jaelen Strong 8 yard pass from Brandon Weeden (Nick Novak kick) HOU 13–10
- HOU 1:56 – Nick Novak 32 yard field goal HOU 16–10

Top passers

- HOU – Brandon Weeden 11/18, 105 yards, 1 TD
- IND – Matt Hasselbeck 17/30, 147 yards, 1 TD, 1 INT

Top rushers

- HOU – Alfred Blue 20 carries, 107 yards, 1 fumble
- IND – Frank Gore 16 carries, 44 yards

Top receivers

- HOU – DeAndre Hopkins 8 receptions, 94 yards
- IND – Donte Moncrief 5 receptions, 51 yards, 1 TD

Top tacklers

- HOU – Benardrick McKinney 7 tackles, 1 sack, 2 tackles for loss
- IND – Jerrell Freeman 12 tackles

T. J. Yates started his second game of the season for the Texans due to Brian Hoyer being out with a concussion. Both teams were held scoreless in the 1st quarter, with the Colts striking first with Matt Hasselbeck connecting with Donte Moncrief for an 11-yard touchdown reception. With Adam Vinatieri making the extra point, Indianapolis lead 7–0 late in the 2nd quarter. The Colts scored again with Vinatieri making a 29-yard field goal, extending their lead to 10–0. The Texans managed to get on the board as the half wined down with a 22-yard field goal from Nick Novak. With Novak's field goal, Houston trailed 3–10 at the half. The Texans' defense held the Colts' offense to zero points in the 2nd half, while Houston's offense scored 13 unanswered points. The Texans made history by beating the Colts in Indianapolis for the first time in franchise history, winning 16–10. Third string quarterback Brandon Weeden helped the Texans past the Colts with an 8-yard pass to Jaelen Strong late in the 4th quarter. With the win, the Texans went to 7–7 and gained sole possession of the AFC South lead. Yates suffered an ACL tear during the game, ending his season.

==== Week 16: at Tennessee Titans ====
Week Sixteen: Houston Texans at Tennessee Titans – Game summary

Quarter	1	2	3	4	Total
Texans	10	7	17	0	34
Titans	0	0	0	6	6

at Nissan Stadium, Nashville, Tennessee

- Date: December 27
- Game time: 12:00 p.m. CST
- Game weather: 73 °F (23 °C), cloudy
- Game attendance: 62,153
- Referee: Brad Allen
- TV announcers (CBS): Spero Dedes and Solomon Wilcots
- Recap, Gamebook

Game information

First quarter

- HOU 13:01 – Quintin Demps 33 yard fumble return (Nick Novak kick) HOU 7–0
- HOU 3:19 – Nick Novak 22 yard field goal HOU 10–0

Second quarter

- HOU 2:32 – Brandon Weeden 7 yard run (Nick Novak kick) HOU 17–0

Third quarter

- HOU 11:33 – DeAndre Hopkins 15 yard pass from Brandon Weeden (Nick Novak kick) HOU 24–0
- HOU 6:12 – Nate Washington 13 yard pass from Brandon Weeden (Nick Novak kick) HOU 31–0
- HOU 0:54 – Nick Novak 36 yard field goal HOU 34–0

Fourth quarter

- TEN 1:31 – Tre McBride 1 yard pass from Zach Mettenberger HOU 34–6

Top passers

- HOU – Brandon Weeden 15/24, 200 yards, 2 TDs
- TEN – Zach Mettenberger 27/51, 234 yards, 1 TD, 1 INT

Top rushers

- HOU – Alfred Blue 15 carries, 45 yards
- TEN – David Cobb 7 carries, 18 yards

Top receivers

- HOU – DeAndre Hopkins 7 receptions, 117 yards, 1 TD
- TEN – Harry Douglas 6 receptions, 79 yards, 1 fumble

Top tacklers

- HOU – Kareem Jackson 5 tackles
- TEN – Michael Griffin 11 tackles

Brandon Weeden started for the Texans as Brian Hoyer was still out due to a concussion.

Tennessee's offense struggled throughout the game, with Antonio Andrews fumbling the ball on the Titans' first possession. Quintin Demps returned the fumble 33 yards for a touchdown. Nick Novak made the extra point to put the Texans up 7–0 early in the game. Early in the 4th quarter, down 0–34, Tennessee marched all the way down to the Houston 9 yard line, the first time the Titans made their way inside the Houston 20. On 3rd and goal Tennessee quarterback Zach Mettenberger was sacked by J. J. Watt, with Mettenberger fumbling the ball and Jared Crick recovering it four Houston. The Texans failed to capitalize on the turnover, having to punt the ball away. Tennessee got their first score of the day with 1:31 left in the game, with Mettenberger connecting with Tre McBride for a 1-yard touchdown reception. The Titans decided to go for a two–point conversion, but the attempt failed. With the Texans receiving the ball back, backup quarterback B. J. Daniels took the knee to close out the game. The Texans defeated the Titans 34–6 and improved to 8–7 and they finished 4-4 on the road.

==== Week 17: vs. Jacksonville Jaguars ====
Week Seventeen: Jacksonville Jaguars at Houston Texans – Game summary

Quarter	1	2	3	4	Total
Jaguars	0	3	3	0	6
Texans	3	17	0	10	30

at NRG Stadium, Houston, Texas

- Date: January 3, 2016
- Game time: 12:00 p.m. CST
- Game weather: Played indoors (retractable roof closed)
- Game attendance: 71,899
- Referee: Terry McAulay
- TV announcers (CBS): Spero Dedes and Solomon Wilcots
- Recap, Gamebook

Game information

First quarter

- HOU 5:27 – Nick Novak 29 yard field goal HOU 3–0

Second quarter

- HOU 14:14 – Jonathan Grimes 12 yard pass from Brian Hoyer (Nick Novak kick) HOU 10–0
- JAX 10:17 – Jason Myers 43 yard field goal HOU 10–3
- HOU 5:37 – Jonathan Grimes 3 yard run (Nick Novak kick) HOU 17–3
- HOU 0:08 – Nick Novak 51 yard field goal HOU 20–3

Third quarter

- JAX 0:46 – Jason Myers 34 yard field goal HOU 20–6

Fourth quarter

- HOU 3:28 – Nick Novak 51 yard field goal HOU 23–6
- HOU 3:09 – Kareem Jackson 27 yard interception return (Nick Novak kick) HOU 30–6

Top passers

- JAX – Blake Bortles 17/32, 239 yards, 2 INTs
- HOU – Brian Hoyer 25/40, 249 yards, 1 TD, 1 INT

Top rushers

- JAX – Jonas Gray 9 carries, 23 yards
- HOU – Alfred Blue 21 carries, 102 yards

Top receivers

- JAX – Allen Robinson 5 receptions, 108 yards
- HOU – DeAndre Hopkins 7 receptions, 89 yards

Top tacklers

- JAX – Johnathan Cyprien 14 tackles
- HOU – J. J. Watt 8 tackles, 3 sacks, 3 tackles for loss, 1 forced fumble

Jacksonville received the opening kickoff, going –5 yards on the drive with Blake Bortles being sacked by J. J. Watt for a loss of 8 yards. The Texans didn't fare much better on their first possession, as Brian Hoyer was sacked by Jared Odrick and Peyton Thompson. Houston scored first with a 29-yard field goal from Nick Novak to lead 3–0 halfway through the first quarter. Brian Cushing forced a fumble in the 2nd quarter, with Watt recovering the ball for the Texans. Houston capitalized on the turnover with a 3-yard touchdown run from Jonathan Grimes. Bortles threw an interception late in the 2nd quarter with Andre Hal catching the pick. The Texans capitalized on the turnover with Novak making a season long 51 yard field goal. At the half, Houston led Jacksonville 20–3. With just over three minutes left in the 4th quarter, Kareem Jackson intercepted a Bortles pass, returning it 27 yards for a touchdown to make it 30–6 final. With the win, the Texans clinched their 3rd AFC South title at 9-7 (5-1 against the AFC South and 5-3 at home) and gained their 3rd trip to the postseason.

===== Game notes =====
Offensive tackle Duane Brown left the game late in the 1st quarter with a left knee injury. Brown was carted off the field, quickly being ruled out for the remainder of the game.

=== Postseason ===
==== AFC Wild Card Playoffs: vs. (5) Kansas City Chiefs ====
AFC Wild Card Playoffs: (5) Kansas City Chiefs at (4) Houston Texans – Game summary

Quarter	1	2	3	4	Total
Chiefs	7	6	7	10	30
Texans	0	0	0	0	0

at NRG Stadium, Houston, Texas

- Date: January 9, 2016
- Game time: 3:35 p.m. CST
- Game weather: Played indoors (retractable roof closed)
- Game attendance: 71,800
- Referee: Ron Torbert
- TV announcers (ESPN/ABC): Mike Tirico, Jon Gruden and Lisa Salters
- Recap, Gamebook

Game information

First quarter

- KC 14:49 – Knile Davis 106 yard kickoff return (Cairo Santos kick) KC 7–0

Second quarter

- KC 12:50 – Cairo Santos 49 yard field goal KC 10–0
- KC 7:11 – Cairo Santos 49 yard field goal KC 13–0

Third quarter

- KC 4:35 – Chris Conley 9 yard pass from Alex Smith (Cairo Santos kick) KC 20–0

Fourth quarter

- KC 14:56 – Spencer Ware 5 yard run (Cairo Santos kick) KC 27–0
- KC 3:59 – Cairo Santos 33 yard field goal KC 30–0

Top passers

- KC – Alex Smith 17/22, 190 yards, 1 TD, 1 INT
- HOU – Brian Hoyer 15/34, 136 yards, 4 INTs, 1 fumble

Top rushers

- KC – Spencer Ware 16 carries, 67 yards, 1 TD
- HOU – Alfred Blue 17 carries, 99 yards

Top receivers

- KC – Travis Kelce 8 receptions, 128 yards
- HOU – DeAndre Hopkins 6 receptions, 69 yards

Top tacklers

- KC – Sean Smith 6 tackles, 1 INT
- HOU – Brian Cushing 13 tackles, 1 INT

The Chiefs received the opening kickoff, with Knile Davis returning it 106 yards for a touchdown. With Cairo Santos making the extra point, Kansas City took a 7–0 lead. On the Texans' second drive, a Brian Hoyer pass was intercepted by Eric Berry. Two plays later, Chiefs quarterback Alex Smith threw an interception that was picked off by linebacker Brian Cushing, Cushing's first pick since week 1 of the 2013 season. Houston came up empty off of the Kansas City turnover, as Hoyer lost control of the ball on a 3rd down play in Chiefs' territory, fumbling it with Dontari Poe recovering for Kansas City. The Chiefs scored 3 off of the Hoyer fumble, with Cairo Santos making a 49-yard field goal to put Kansas City up 10–0 early in the 2nd. Santos later made another 49-yard field goal to extend the Chiefs' lead to 13–0. Houston found the redzone of Kansas City for the first time with a 49-yard run from Alfred Blue. This was short lived as Hoyer threw another interception on 3rd and goal, with Josh Mauga getting the pick. Houston got the ball back, but Hoyer threw another interception on the play following the 2 minute warning, with Marcus Peters on the pick. The Chiefs led 13–0 at the half, with Brian Hoyer turning it over 4 times in the first half with fans booing him going into the locker room.

Houston made it into Kansas City territory coming out of the locker room, but came up short on the drive, having to settle for another punt from Shane Lechler. J. J. Watt almost sacked Smith on the next play, who took off for a 63-yard run that was called back due to offensive holding. The Chiefs got their first offensive touchdown of the day with Smith connecting to Chris Conley for a 9-yard touchdown pass; with Santos making the extra point, Kansas City extended their lead to 20–0. The Chiefs extended their lead once again with a 9-yard rush from Spencer Ware early in the 4th quarter. Hoyer fumbled the ball once again in the Chiefs' territory on 4th and 7, recovering it only to be tackled for a turnover on downs. The Texans suffered both their first Wild Card loss and home shutout loss in franchise history, falling to the Chiefs 0–30.

== Standings ==
=== Division ===
AFC South
	W	L	T	PCT	DIV	CONF	PF	PA	STK
^{(4)} Houston Texans	9	7	0	.563	5–1	7–5	339	313	W3
Indianapolis Colts	8	8	0	.500	4–2	6–6	333	408	W2
Jacksonville Jaguars	5	11	0	.313	2–4	5–7	376	448	L3
Tennessee Titans	3	13	0	.188	1–5	1–11	299	423	L4

=== Conference ===
AFC
#	Team	Division	W	L	T	PCT	DIV	CONF	SOS	SOV	STK
Division Leaders
1 (Note: Denver finished ahead of New England and Cincinnati for the No. 1 seed based on head-to-head sweep. New England finished ahead of Cincinnati for the No. 2 seed based on record vs. common opponents — New England's cumulative record against Buffalo, Denver, Houston and Pittsburgh was 4–1, while Cincinnati's cumulative record against the same four teams was 2–3.)	Denver Broncos	West	12	4	0	.750	4–2	8–4	.500	.479	W2
2	New England Patriots	East	12	4	0	.750	4–2	9–3	.473	.448	L2
3	Cincinnati Bengals	North	12	4	0	.750	5–1	9–3	.477	.406	W1
4	Houston Texans	South	9	7	0	.563	5–1	7–5	.496	.410	W3
Wild Cards
5	Kansas City Chiefs	West	11	5	0	.688	5–1	10–2	.496	.432	W10
6 (Note: Pittsburgh finished ahead of the New York Jets for the No. 6 seed and qualified for the last playoff spot based on record vs. common opponents — Pittsburgh's cumulative record against Cleveland, Indianapolis, New England and Oakland was 4–1, while the Jets' cumulative record against the same four teams was 3–2.)	Pittsburgh Steelers	North	10	6	0	.625	3–3	7–5	.504	.463	W1
Did not qualify for the postseason
7	New York Jets	East	10	6	0	.625	3–3	7–5	.441	.388	L1
8 (Note: Buffalo finished ahead of Indianapolis based on head-to-head victory.)	Buffalo Bills	East	8	8	0	.500	4–2	7–5	.508	.438	W2
9	Indianapolis Colts	South	8	8	0	.500	4–2	6–6	.500	.406	W2
10	Oakland Raiders	West	7	9	0	.438	3–3	7–5	.512	.366	L1
11	Miami Dolphins	East	6	10	0	.375	1–5	4–8	.469	.469	W2
12 (Note: Jacksonville finished ahead of Baltimore based on head-to-head victory.)	Jacksonville Jaguars	South	5	11	0	.313	2–4	5–7	.473	.375	L3
13	Baltimore Ravens	North	5	11	0	.313	3–3	4–8	.508	.425	L1
14	San Diego Chargers	West	4	12	0	.250	0–6	3–9	.527	.328	L2
15 (Note: Cleveland finished ahead of Tennessee based on head-to-head victory.)	Cleveland Browns	North	3	13	0	.188	1–5	2–10	.531	.271	L3
16	Tennessee Titans	South	3	13	0	.188	1–5	1–11	.492	.375	L4
Tiebreakers (Note: When breaking ties for three or more teams under the NFL's rules, they are first broken within divisions, then comparing only the highest ranked remaining team from each division.)

== Statistics ==
=== Team ===
Category	Total yards	Yards per game	NFL rank (out of 32)
Passing offense	3,833	239.6	18th
Rushing offense	1,731	108.2	15th
Total offense	5,564	347.8	19th
Passing defense	3,366	210.4	3rd
Rushing defense	1,597	99.8	10th
Total defense	4,963	310.2	3rd

=== Individual ===
Category	Player	Total
Offense
Passing yards	Brian Hoyer	2,606
Passing touchdowns	Brian Hoyer	19
Rushing yards	Alfred Blue	698
Rushing touchdowns	Alfred Blue	2
Receiving yards	DeAndre Hopkins	1,521
Receiving touchdowns	DeAndre Hopkins	11
Defense
Tackles (Solo)	Brian Cushing	63
Sacks	J. J. Watt	17.5
Interceptions	Andre Hal	4
