= Andre Hal =

American football player (born 1992)

No. 29
- Position: Safety

Personal information
- Born: May 30, 1992 (age 34); Port Allen, Louisiana, U.S.
- Listed height: 5 ft 10 in (1.78 m)
- Listed weight: 195 lb (88 kg)

Career information
- High school: Port Allen
- College: Vanderbilt
- NFL draft: 2014: 7th round, 216th overall pick

Career history
- Houston Texans (2014–2018)

Awards and highlights
- 2× Second-team All-SEC (2012, 2013)

Career NFL statistics
- Total tackles: 189
- Sacks: 1
- Forced fumbles: 2
- Pass deflections: 31
- Interceptions: 12
- Defensive touchdowns: 1
- Stats at Pro Football Reference

Andre Jeroy Hal Jr. (born May 30, 1992) is an American former professional football player who was a safety in the National Football League (NFL). He spent his five-year NFL career with the Houston Texans who selected him in the seventh round of the 2014 NFL draft. He played college football for the Vanderbilt Commodores.

== Early life ==
Hal attended Port Allen High School in Port Allen, Louisiana, where he played on the football team. He was a senior captain and a four-year starter at defensive back. As a senior, he helped lead his team to the district title and advance to first round of 3A state playoffs. He collected 53 total tackles and four interceptions as a senior, earning first-team 3A All-State honors after returning five kickoffs for scores, and contributing with three touchdown receptions on offense. He also was a member of the school's track and field team, and was part of the 3A state champion 4x200-meter relay foursome (TJ Herbert, Mitchell Moore, Johnathan Johnson) that also set the state record, third fastest time in the nation.

Considered a three-star recruit by Rivals.com, he was rated as the 56th best cornerback prospect of his class.

== College career ==
Hal attended Vanderbilt University, where he played with the Commodores football team from 2010 to 2013. As a true freshman in 2010, he appeared in all 12 games, and started two games late into the season, finishing with 15 total tackles and also averaged 23.6 yards on 11 kickoff returns. In 2011, he recorded 21 tackles, and as kickoff returner, he averaged 23.8 yards, collecting 738 yards on 31 returns, including a 96-yard touchdown return against Georgia. In 2012, he started all 13 games, registering 48 tackles, two interceptions and a team leading 14 passes defended. As a senior in 2013, Hal earned second-team All-SEC honors. He finished with 49 total tackles, including 6.5 for loss, three interceptions, a fumble recovery, and an SEC leading 18 passes defended.

== Professional career ==
External videos
- Andre Hal's NFL Combine workout

Pre-draft measurables
Height	Weight	Arm length	Hand span	40-yard dash	10-yard split	20-yard split	20-yard shuttle	Three-cone drill	Vertical jump	Broad jump	Bench press
5 ft 10 3/8 in (1.79 m)	188 lb (85 kg)	30 1/2 in (0.77 m)	8 5/8 in (0.22 m)	4.50 s	1.57 s	2.63 s	4.27 s	7.14 s	35.5 in (0.90 m)	9 ft 11 in (3.02 m)	15 reps
All values are from NFL Combine

=== 2014 ===
The Houston Texans selected Hal in the seventh round (216th overall) of the 2014 NFL draft. He was the 29th cornerback selected.

On May 15, 2014, the Texans signed Hal to a four-year, $2.28 million contract that includes a signing bonus of $69,124.

Throughout training camp, secondary coach John Butler held an open competition for the job as the third cornerback on the depth chart. The competition included A. J. Bouye, Brandon Harris, Josh Victorian, Elbert Mack, and Marcus Williams. Head coach Bill O'Brien named Hal the fifth cornerback on the depth chart to start the regular season, behind Johnathan Joseph, Kareem Jackson, A. J. Bouye, and Elbert Mack.

He made his professional regular season debut in the Texans' season-opener against the Washington Redskins and made his first career tackle on returner Andre Roberts during a 28-yard kick return in the second quarter of their 17–6 victory. Prior to Week 5, the Houston Texans promoted Hal to the role as the third cornerback on the depth chart after A. J. Bouye suffered a groin injury and backup Darryl Morris sustained an ankle injury during their victory against the Buffalo Bills the previous week. On November 2, 2014, Hal recorded a season-high seven combined tackles and two pass deflections during a 31–21 loss to the Philadelphia Eagles. He was a healthy scratch for two consecutive games (Weeks 14–15). Hal finished his rookie season in 2014 with 21 combined tackles (18 solo) and four pass deflections in 14 games and 14 starts.

=== 2015 ===
During organized team activities and training camp, Hal started a conversion to the safety position. Texans' staff chose to move him to safety after it became evident his ability to earn playing time at cornerback would be difficult due to the arrival of 2015 first round pick Kevin Johnson and the presence of Johnathan Joseph, Kareem Jackson, and A. J. Bouye. Throughout training camp, Hal competed against Eddie Pleasant, Lonnie Ballentine, and Stevie Brown for the job as the starting strong safety after it was left vacant due to the release of D. J. Swearinger. Defensive coordinator Romeo Crennel named Hal the backup strong safety behind newly acquired free agent Quintin Demps to start the regular season.

On October 18, 2015, Hal earned his first career start at strong safety in place of Quintin Demps, who sustained a hamstring injury the previous week. Hal recorded three combined tackles, two pass deflections, two interceptions, and his first career touchdown during their 31–20 victory at the Jacksonville Jaguars. He made his first career interception in the third quarter off a pass by quarterback Blake Bortles that was intended for tight end Julius Thomas. In the fourth quarter, he intercepted Bortles for the second time and returned it for a 31-yard touchdown. On October 29, 2015, head coach Bill O'Brien notified Hal that he would replace Rahim Moore as the starting free safety for the upcoming game in Week 8. He earned the role after performing well while filling in at strong safety for Quintin Demps (Weeks 6–7) during his absence. The switch was also partly due to Moore's issues with tackling and his poor pursuit angles. On November 1, 2015, he made his first start as the starting free safety and recorded two solo tackles in the Texans' 20–6 win against the Tennessee Titans. In Week 13, Hal collected a season-high five combined tackles and deflected a pass in the Texans' 30–21 loss at the Bills. On January 3, 2016, he made four combined tackles, a season-high two pass deflections, and intercepted a pass by Blake Bortles in their 30–6 victory against the Jacksonville Jaguars. He finished the 2015 season with 36 combined tackles (27 solo), a career-high ten pass deflections, a career-high four interceptions, and a touchdown in 16 games and 11 starts. Pro Football Focus gave Hal an overall grade of 71.1 in his first season as a safety.

The Texans finished first in the AFC South with a 9–7 record. On January 9, 2016, Hal started his first career playoff game and recorded five combined tackles during a 30–0 loss against the Kansas City Chiefs in the AFC Wildcard Game.

=== 2016 ===
Head coach Bill O'Brien retained Hal and Demps as the starting safety duo to start the 2016 regular season.

He started the Texans' season-opener against the Chicago Bears and made two combined tackles, a pass deflection, and intercepted a pass by Jay Cutler in their 23–14 victory. On October 16, 2016, Hal recorded four combined tackles and made his first career sack on quarterback Andrew Luck during a 26–23 victory against the Indianapolis Colts. In Week 8, he collected a season-high five combined tackles in the Texans' 20–13 win against the Detroit Lions. Hal was inactive for the Texans' Week 13 loss at the Green Bay Packers due to an unspecified illness. Upon his return, he was demoted to backup free safety behind Corey Moore for the remainder of the season. His demotion was due to multiple missed tackles. Hal finished the 2016 season with 48 combined tackles (32 solo), seven pass deflections, and two interceptions in 15 games and 11 starts. He received the 60th highest overall grade from Pro Football Focus out of the 90 qualifying safeties in 2016.

The Texans finished top of their division with a 9–7 record for the second consecutive season. Defensive coordinator Romeo Crennel opted to start Hal at starting free safety over Corey Moore for the playoffs and the Texans went on to defeat the Oakland Raiders 27–14 in the AFC Wildcard Game. On January 14, 2017, Hal recorded six combined tackles, two pass deflections, and intercepted a pass Tom Brady during a 34–16 loss at the New England Patriots in the AFC Divisional Round.

=== 2017 ===
Hal entered training camp slated as the starting free safety and saw minimal competition from Corey Moore, K. J. Dillon, and Eddie Pleasant. Defensive coordinator Mike Vrabel named Hal the starting free safety to start the regular season, along with strong safety Corey Moore.

On August 31, 2017, the Houston Texans signed Hal to a three-year, $15 million contract extension with $7 million guaranteed.

On October 1, 2017, Hal recorded four combined tackles, two pass deflections, and intercepted two passes by Marcus Mariota during a 57–14 victory against the Titans. The following week, he collected a season-high nine combined tackles and broke up a pass in the Texans' 42–34 loss to the Kansas City Chiefs. He finished the 2017 season with a career-high 71 combined tackles (47 solo), five pass deflections, and three interceptions in 16 games and 16 starts. The Houston Texans did not qualify for the playoffs after finishing with a 4–12 record.

=== 2018 ===
On June 6, 2018, it was revealed that Hal was diagnosed with Hodgkin's Lymphoma. He was placed on the reserve/non-football illness list on September 1, 2018. After his cancer went into remission on September 26, 2018, he was activated off the NFI list to the active roster on October 20, 2018. Hal made his first start of 2018 against the Jaguars in Week 7 on October 21, 2018. He had one tackle in the 20–7 win. He finished the season with 13 tackles, five passes defended, and three interceptions through eight games and two starts.

=== Retirement ===
On April 2, 2019, Hal announced his retirement from the NFL.

== NFL career statistics ==
Legend
**Bold**	Career high

=== Regular season ===
Year	Team	Games		Tackles					Interceptions					Fumbles			
Year	Team	GP	GS	Cmb	Solo	Ast	Sck	TFL	Int	Yds	TD	Lng	PD	FF	FR	Yds	TD
2014	HOU	14	0	21	18	3	0.0	0	0	0	0	0	4	0	0	0	0
2015	HOU	**16**	11	36	27	9	0.0	1	**4**	**54**	**1**	**31**	**10**	0	0	0	0
2016	HOU	15	11	48	32	16	**1.0**	2	2	36	0	24	7	0	0	0	0
2017	HOU	**16**	**16**	**71**	**47**	**24**	0.0	**3**	3	10	0	7	5	**2**	0	0	0
2018	HOU	8	2	13	6	7	0.0	0	3	2	0	2	5	0	0	0	0
Career		69	40	189	130	59	1.0	6	12	102	1	31	31	2	0	0	0

=== Playoffs ===
Year	Team	Games		Tackles					Interceptions					Fumbles			
Year	Team	GP	GS	Cmb	Solo	Ast	Sck	TFL	Int	Yds	TD	Lng	PD	FF	FR	Yds	TD
2015	HOU	1	1	5	2	3	0.0	0	0	0	0	0	0	0	0	0	0
2016	HOU	**2**	**2**	**12**	**7**	**5**	0.0	0	**1**	**6**	0	**6**	**3**	0	0	0	0
2018	HOU	1	1	2	1	1	0.0	0	0	0	0	0	0	0	0	0	0
Career		4	4	19	10	9	0.0	0	1	6	0	6	3	0	0	0	0
