= List of Houston Texans first-round draft picks =

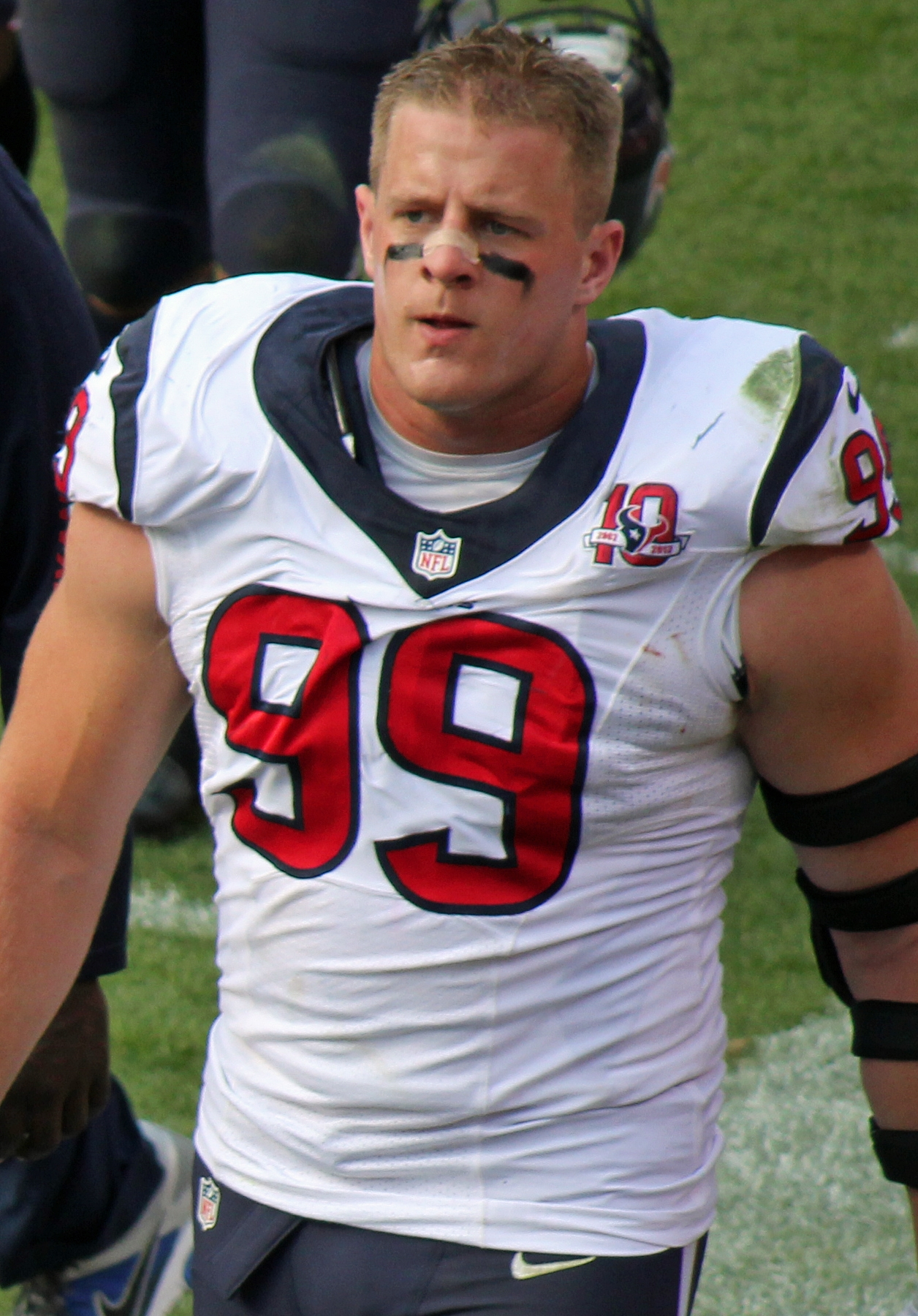
J. J. Watt, widely regarded to be the greatest Texans player of all time, was drafted 11th overall in the 2011 NFL draft.

The Houston Texans are a professional American football team from Houston, playing in the National Football League (NFL). They joined the NFL in 2002 as an expansion franchise. (Note: The franchise was established in 1999, but played its first season in 2002.) Following the controversial relocation of the Houston Oilers to Nashville (Note: Now the Tennessee Titans) and the NFL's need for a 32nd team in the league, Houston was awarded the upcoming franchise, at a cost of $700 million paid by then-owner Bob McNair. The Houston Texans made their first selection as an NFL team in the 2002 NFL draft, selecting Fresno State quarterback David Carr number 1 overall. The team's most recent first-round selection was Keylan Rutledge, a guard from Georgia Tech in 2026.

Every year during April, each NFL franchise seeks to add new players to its roster through a collegiate draft known as the "NFL Annual Player Selection Meeting," which is more commonly known as the NFL Draft. Teams are ranked in inverse order based on the previous season's record, with the team with the worst record picking first, and the second worst picking second and so on. The two exceptions to this order are made for teams that appeared in the previous Super Bowl; the Super Bowl champion always picks 32nd, with the loser of the big game always picking 31st. Teams have the option of trading away their picks to other teams for different picks, players, cash, or a combination thereof. Thus, it is not uncommon for a team's actual draft pick to differ from their assigned draft pick, or for a team to have extra or no draft picks in any round due to these trades.

The Texans have selected number one overall three times, David Carr in 2002, Mario Williams in 2006, and Jadeveon Clowney in 2014. The Houston Texans have only three times drafted two or more times in the first round, which occurred in 2004, 2022 and 2023.

Andre Johnson is the Texans' only draft pick to be elected to the Pro Football Hall of Fame.

== Key ==
B	Back	K	Kicker	NT	Nose tackle
C	Center	LB	Linebacker	FB	Fullback
DB	Defensive back	P	Punter	HB	Halfback
DE	Defensive end	QB	Quarterback	WR	Wide receiver
DT	Defensive tackle	RB	Running back	G	Guard
E	End	T	Offensive tackle	TE	Tight end
^	Enshrined in the Pro Football Hall of Fame				
*	Selected number one overall				
†	Indicates the player was selected for the Pro Bowl				

== Player selections ==
Houston Texans first-round draft picks
Year	Pick	Player name	Position	College	Notes	Ref
2002	1	David Carr*	QB	Fresno State	First draft pick in franchise history. Agreed to contract before the draft.	
2003	3	Andre Johnson †^	WR	Miami(FL)	7× Pro Bowl selection 2× All-Pro first-team selection	
2004	10	Dunta Robinson	CB	South Carolina		
2004	27	Jason Babin†	DE	Western Michigan	2× Pro Bowl selection.	(Note: On April 24, 2004, the Texans traded their 2004 second round pick, third round pick, fourth round pick, and fifth round pick to the Tennessee Titans for their 2004 first round pick (27th overall) and fifth-round pick.)
2005	16	Travis Johnson	DT	Florida State		(Note: On April 23, 2005, the Texans traded their 2005 first round pick (13th overall) to the New Orleans Saints for their 2005 first round pick (16th overall) and a 2006 third round pick.)
2006	1	Mario Williams*†	DE	North Carolina State	4× Pro Bowl selection 1× All-Pro first-team selection	
2007	10	Amobi Okoye	DT	Louisville	Youngest player ever taken in modern draft era	
2008	26	Duane Brown†	T	Virginia Tech	4× Pro Bowl selection 1× All-Pro first-team selection	
2009	15	Brian Cushing†	LB	USC	1× Pro Bowl selection 2009 Defensive Rookie of the Year	
2010	20	Kareem Jackson	CB	Alabama		
2011	11	J. J. Watt†	DE	Wisconsin	5× Pro Bowl selection 5× All-Pro first-team selection 2014 Bert Bell Award; 3× Defensive Player of the Year; 2017 Walter Payton NFL Man of the Year	
2012	26	Whitney Mercilus	DE	Illinois		
2013	27	DeAndre Hopkins†	WR	Clemson	3× Pro Bowl selection 2× All-Pro first team selection	
2014	1	Jadeveon Clowney*†	DE	South Carolina	3× Pro Bowl selection 1× All-Pro first-team selection	
2015	16	Kevin Johnson	CB	Wake Forest		
2016	21	Will Fuller	WR	Notre Dame		(Note: On April 28, 2016, the Texans traded their 2016 first round pick (22nd overall) and a 2017 sixth round pick to the Washington Redskins for their 2016 first round pick (21st overall).)
2017	12	Deshaun Watson†	QB	Clemson	3× Pro Bowl selection 2020 NFL passing yards leader	
2018	No pick				Part of trade to acquire selection to draft Deshaun Watson	(Note: On April 27, 2017, the Texans traded their 2017 first round pick (25th overall) and their 2018 first round pick (4th overall) to the Cleveland Browns in exchange for their 2017 first round pick (12th overall).)
2019	23	Tytus Howard	T	Alabama State		
2020	No pick				Part of trade to acquire Laremy Tunsil	(Note: Traded to Miami Dolphins, who traded to Green Bay Packers, used to select Jordan Love)
2021	No pick				Part of trade to acquire Laremy Tunsil	(Note: Traded to Miami Dolphins, who traded to San Francisco 49ers, used to select Trey Lance)
2022	3	Derek Stingley Jr.†	CB	LSU		
2022	15	Kenyon Green	G	Texas A&M		(Note: On March 18, 2022, the Texans traded quarterback Deshaun Watson and a 2024 sixth-round selection to Cleveland in exchange for Cleveland's first-round selection (13th overall) and fourth-round selection previously acquired from Detroit (107th overall), as well as 2023 and 2024 first-round selections, a 2023 third-round selection, and a 2024 fourth-round selection. The Texans traded the 2022 13th overall pick to Philadelphia in exchange for a first-round selection (15th overall), fourth-round selection (124th overall), and two fifth-round selections (162nd and 166th overall).)
2023	2	C. J. Stroud†	QB	Ohio State	2023 Offensive Rookie of the Year	
2023	3	Will Anderson Jr.†	LB	Alabama	2023 Defensive Rookie of the Year	
2024	No pick				Part of trade to acquire selection to draft Will Anderson Jr.	(Note: Traded to Arizona Cardinals, used to select Darius Robinson)
2025	No pick					(Note: Traded to New York Giants, used to select Jaxson Dart)
2026	26	Keylan Rutledge	G	Georgia Tech		
