= Chris Polk =

American football player (born 1989)

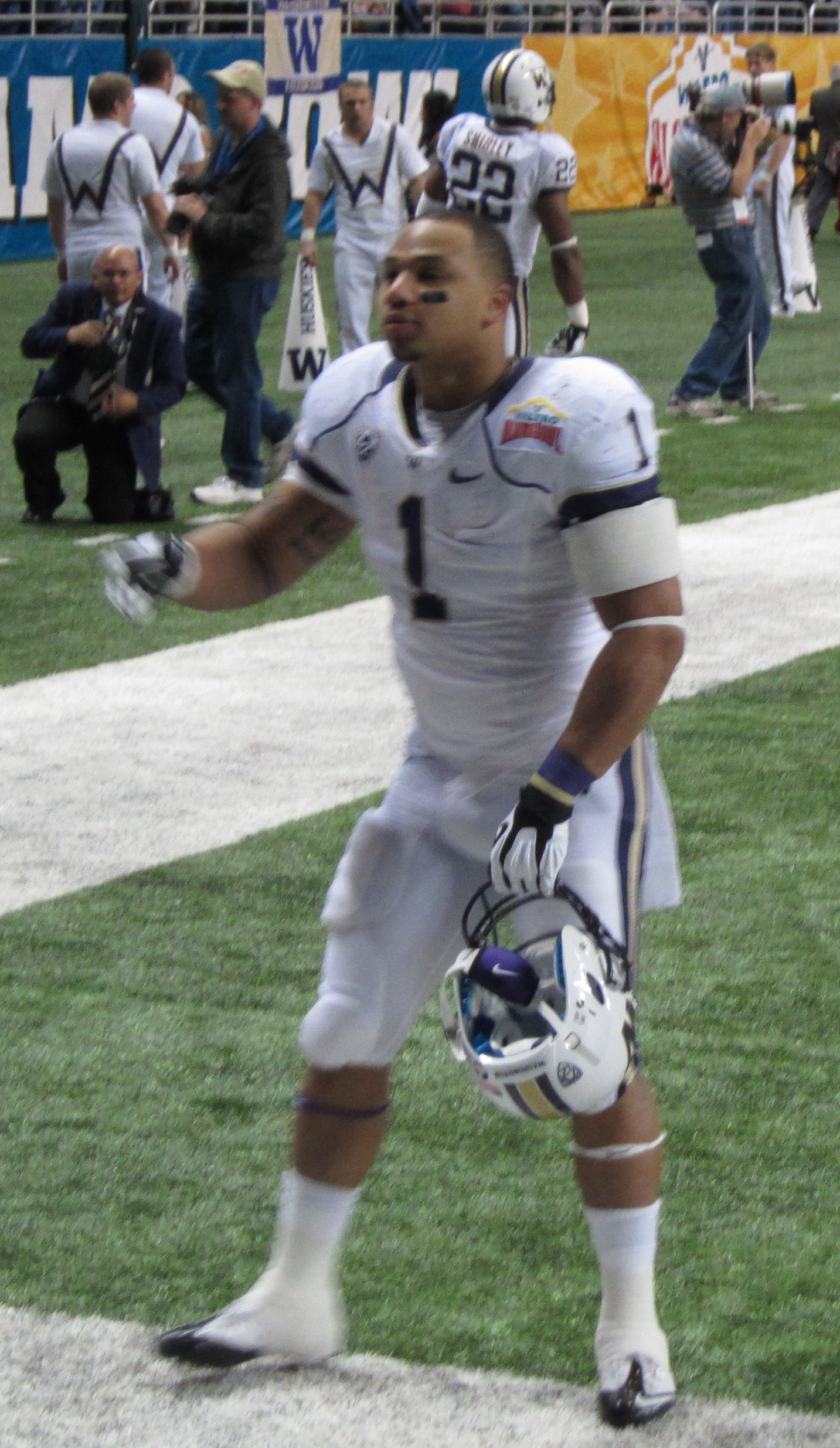
- Polk at the 2011 Alamo Bowl

No. 32, 22
- Position: Running back

Personal information
- Born: December 16, 1989 (age 36); San Pedro, California, U.S.
- Listed height: 5 ft 10 in (1.78 m)
- Listed weight: 224 lb (102 kg)

Career information
- High school: Redlands East Valley (Redlands, California)
- College: Washington
- NFL draft: 2012: undrafted

Career history
- Philadelphia Eagles (2012–2014); Houston Texans (2015)

Awards and highlights
- First-team All-Pac-12 (2011); Second-team All-Pac-10 (2010)

Career NFL statistics
- Rushing attempts: 156
- Rushing yards: 604
- Receptions: 22
- Receiving yards: 186
- Return yards: 348
- Total touchdowns: 10
- Stats at Pro Football Reference

Chris Polk (born December 16, 1989) is an American former professional football player who was a running back in the National Football League (NFL). He played college football for the Washington Huskies. Despite being considered a top running back prospect for the 2012 NFL draft, he went undrafted due to concerns over a potentially degenerative shoulder condition. He signed with the Philadelphia Eagles as an undrafted free agent in 2012.

== Early life ==
Polk played at Redlands East Valley High School in Redlands, California. Rated the #4 all-purpose back in the nation, Polk led his team to a 12-1 record and to the Inland Division semifinals in 2007. During his senior season Polk had a game in which he rushed for 214 yards on only 5 carries. Polk earned first-team All-CIF Southern Section Inland Division honors as well as being named a SuperPrep All-American his senior season.

== College career ==
Polk enrolled early at the University of Washington in January 2008. He played in the first two games of the season before being injured and missing the rest of the season. Although he qualified for a medical redshirt for the 2008 season, he never applied and sat out the remainder of the season.

Polk became the starting running back in 2009 and also worked as a kick returner. He rushed for 1,113 yards on 226 attempts and five touchdowns after playing in all 12 games of the season. He had four consecutive 100-yard games, which is third in school history. He earned honorable mention All-Pac-10 honors and freshman All-Pac-10 first-team honors.^{[1]}

Polk played in all 13 games at running back in 2010, and recorded 1,415 yards and nine touchdowns on 260 attempts. In a game against Washington State, he rushed for a career-high 284 yards and two touchdowns on 29 attempts. Polk's 284 yards was second-most in school history, trailing Hugh McElhenny's 296 in the 1950 Apple Cup. He rushed for 177 yards and a touchdown against 18th-ranked Nebraska in the Holiday Bowl. At the end of the game he was named the Offensive MVP.

Polk suffered a knee injury during practice before the 2011 season that needed to be corrected with arthroscopic surgery. He rushed for 125 yards on 23 attempts during the season-opener against Eastern Washington. Against Arizona on October 30, he gained 244 total yards and scored five touchdowns, one shy of the single-game Pac-12 record.

== Professional career ==
Pre-draft measurables
Height	Weight	Arm length	Hand span	40-yard dash	10-yard split	20-yard split	20-yard shuttle	Three-cone drill	Vertical jump	Broad jump	Bench press
5 ft 10 1/2 in (1.79 m)	215 lb (98 kg)	31 1/2 in (0.80 m)	9 3/4 in (0.25 m)	4.45 s	1.57 s	2.62 s	4.21 s	7.13 s	31.5 in (0.80 m)	9 ft 3 in (2.82 m)	16 reps
All values from 2012 NFL Scouting Combine/Pro Day

=== Philadelphia Eagles ===
Polk signed as an undrafted free agent with the Philadelphia Eagles on April 28, 2012. The Sporting News called Polk the top undrafted player of the 2012 NFL draft. It is believed that injury concerns led to Polk's not being drafted. He made the team and was the 4th string running back all season.

In his second season, after third string running back Dion Lewis was traded to the Browns, Polk made more of an impact for the Eagles, rushing for 98 yards on the season, including three touchdowns. He ran for a career-high 50 yards on four carries in a week 14 win over the Detroit Lions. He finished fifth on the team in rushing yards (98), behind LeSean McCoy, Bryce Brown, Michael Vick and Nick Foles.

In Week 3 of the 2014 season, Polk was given kick return duty against the Washington Redskins. His best game rushing was against the Cowboys in Philadelphia, where he scored two touchdowns on two carries in a 27-38 loss. He finished with 172 yards rushing and 340 returning on only 11 returns, with 5 all-purpose touchdowns. Despite only having 46 carries, Polk finished third in both rushing yards (172) and rushing touchdowns (4), behind Lesean McCoy (1,319, 5) and newly acquired Darren Sproles (329, 6). Polk was given a restricted free agent tender after the 2014 season, but on April 24, 2015, the team rescinded the tender, making him an unrestricted free agent.

=== Houston Texans ===
Polk signed a one-year deal with the Houston Texans on April 28, 2015. Due to injuries limiting the starter Arian Foster to only 4 games, Polk had more opportunities as the Texans' backup running back. Polk played in 15 games and started 2, recording 99 carries for 334 yards and a touchdown, as well as 16 catches for 109 yards and his first career receiving touchdown.

== Notes ==
1. Polk was technically a sophomore in 2009, but the NCAA and the University of Washington erroneously regarded the season as his redshirt freshman season.

== See also ==
- Washington Huskies football statistical leaders
