= Reshard Cliett =

American gridiron football player (born 1992)

No. 43, 58
- Position: Linebacker

Personal information
- Born: April 29, 1992 (age 34); Thomasville, Georgia, U.S.
- Listed height: 6 ft 2 in (1.88 m)
- Listed weight: 225 lb (102 kg)

Career information
- High school: Thomas County Central (Thomasville, Georgia)
- College: South Florida (2010–2014)
- NFL draft: 2015: 6th round, 211th overall pick

Career history
- Houston Texans (2015); Denver Broncos (2016)*; New York Jets (2016)*; Arizona Cardinals (2016)*; Tennessee Titans (2017)*; Kansas City Chiefs (2017)*; Minnesota Vikings (2018–2019)*; Dallas Renegades (2020); Toronto Argonauts (2021); Montreal Alouettes (2021)
- * Offseason or practice squad member only
- Stats at Pro Football Reference

Reshard Cliett (born April 29, 1992) is an American former professional football linebacker. He played college football at South Florida. He was selected by the Houston Texans in the sixth round of the 2015 NFL draft.

== Early life ==
Cliett attended Thomas County Central High School in Thomasville, Georgia. While there, he was recorded running a 4.5 40-yard dash. He suffered a knee injury and missed his entire junior season. The next season, as a senior safety, he recorded 97 tackles and four interceptions. He received offers from South Florida, Georgia Southern, Eastern Kentucky and South Alabama.

== College career ==
Cliett selected to attend South Florida where he majored in interdisciplinary social science. As a freshman in 2010, he was redshirted and didn't appear in a game until the next season. In 2011, he appeared in nine game, both on defense and special teams. He recorded five tackles, 1.5 tackles-for-loss, a sack and one pass break up. In 2012, he appeared in 11 games, starting six at linebacker and he also played special teams. He recorded 40 tackles, two for-losses, a sack, three passes broken up and a fumble recovery. In 2013, he appeared in 11 games, starting 10. He recorded 56 tackles, seven for-losses, three pass break-ups and one sack. In 2014, he was named a team captain. For the season, he recorded 38 tackles, 7.5 for-losses and a team-leading six sacks.

For his college career, he recorded 134 total tackles, 16 for-losses, seven sacks, seven pass-break ups and two fumble recoveries.

== Professional career ==
=== Pre-draft ===
During his pro day work out, Cliett recorded a 4.4 and 4.5 second 40-yard dash. He also recorded a 38 1/2" vertical leap, a 10-foot 4 inch broad jump, a 4.53 second short shuttle, a 7.2 second 3-cone drill. He also recorded 21 reps of 225 pounds, and weighed in at 235 lbs.

=== Houston Texans ===
Cliett was selected in the sixth round (211th overall) of the 2015 NFL draft by the Houston Texans. He signed his rookie contract on May 8, 2015. Cliett was placed on injured reserve with a knee injury on September 1.

On September 3, 2016, Cliett was released by the Texans.

=== Denver Broncos ===
On September 13, 2016, Cliett was signed to the practice squad of the Denver Broncos. He was released by the Broncos on October 18.

=== New York Jets ===
On October 26, 2016, Cliett was signed to the New York Jets' practice squad. He was released by the Jets on November 1.

=== Arizona Cardinals ===
On November 22, 2016, Cliett was signed to the Arizona Cardinals' practice squad. He was released by Arizona on December 6, but was re-signed on December 13.

=== Tennessee Titans ===
On January 3, 2017, Cliett signed a reserve/future contract with the Tennessee Titans. On May 15, he was waived by the Titans.

=== Kansas City Chiefs ===
On May 16, 2017, Cliett was claimed off waivers by the Kansas City Chiefs. He was waived/injured on August 6, and placed on injured reserve. Cliett was released by the Chiefs on August 12.

=== Minnesota Vikings ===
On March 29, 2018, Cliett signed with the Minnesota Vikings. He was waived on September 1, and was re-signed to the practice squad the next day. Cliett signed a reserve/future contract with the Vikings on January 2, 2019.

On August 31, 2019, Cliett was waived by the Vikings. He was re-signed to the practice squad on December 3. Cliett's practice squad contract with the team expired on January 20, 2020.

=== Dallas Renegades ===
On October 16, 2019, Cliett was selected by the Dallas Renegades of the XFL in the 2020 XFL draft . He signed a contract with the team on January 18, 2020. Cliett had his contract terminated when the league suspended operations on April 10.

=== Toronto Argonauts ===
On February 15, 2021, Cliett signed with the Toronto Argonauts of the Canadian Football League (CFL). He spent most of the season on the practice roster and played in one regular season game before being released on October 18.

=== Montreal Alouettes ===
Cliett signed with the Montreal Alouettes of the CFL on October 20, 2021, and played in one regular season game for the team in 2021.
