= Duane Brown =

American football player (born 1985)

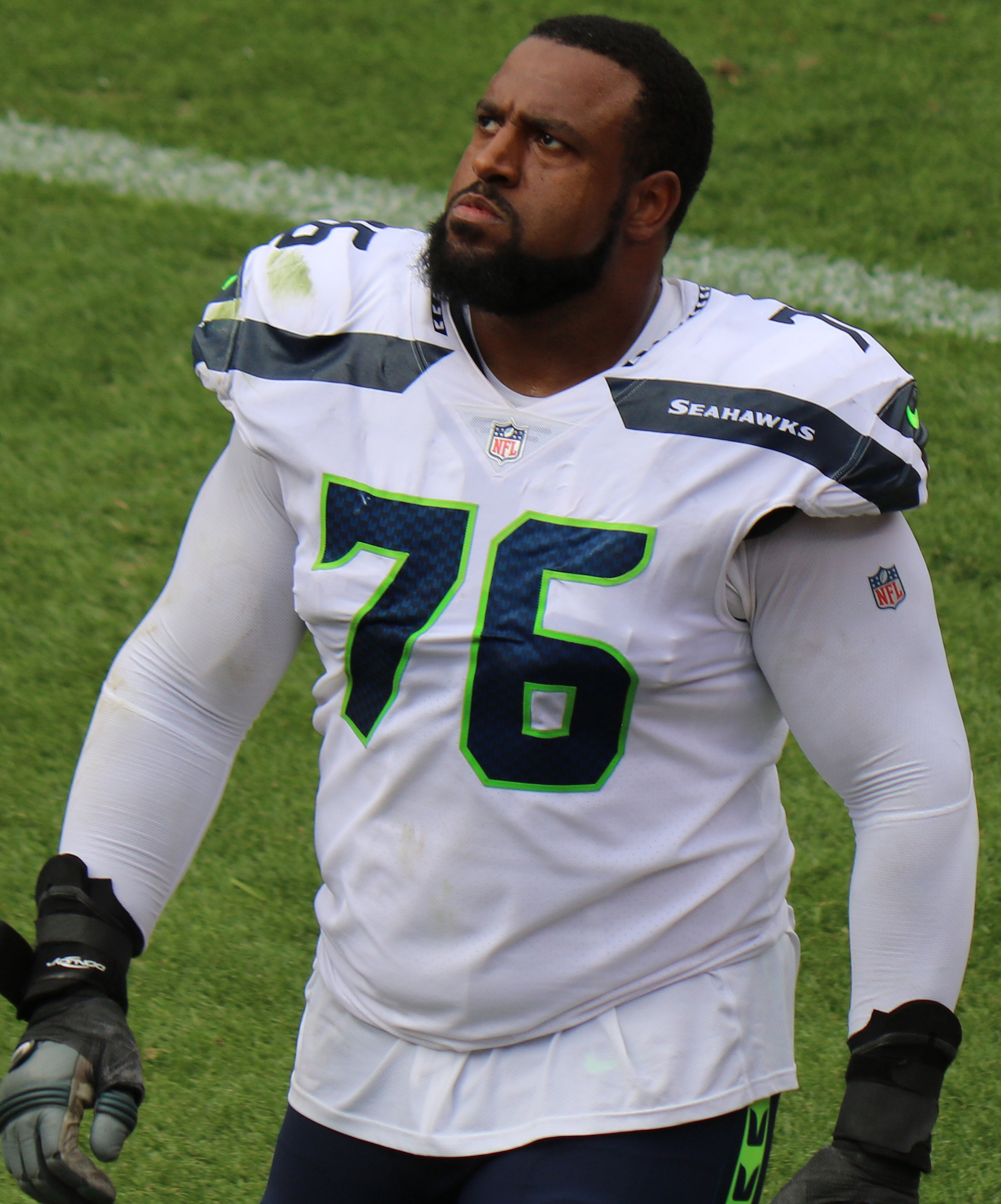
- Brown with the Seattle Seahawks in 2018

No. 76, 71
- Position: Offensive tackle

Personal information
- Born: August 30, 1985 (age 41); Richmond, Virginia, U.S.
- Listed height: 6 ft 4 in (1.93 m)
- Listed weight: 329 lb (149 kg)

Career information
- High school: Hermitage (Henrico, Virginia)
- College: Virginia Tech (2003–2007)
- NFL draft: 2008: 1st round, 26th overall pick

Career history
- Houston Texans (2008–2017); Seattle Seahawks (2017–2021); New York Jets (2022–2023)

Awards and highlights
- First-team All-Pro (2012); 2× Second-team All-Pro (2011, 2018); 5× Pro Bowl (2012–2014, 2017, 2021); 2× Second-team All-ACC (2006–2007)

Career NFL statistics
- Games played: 220
- Games started: 218
- Stats at Pro Football Reference

Duane Anthony Brown (born August 30, 1985) is an American former professional football offensive tackle. He played college football for the Virginia Tech Hokies and was selected by the Houston Texans in the first round of the 2008 NFL draft. Brown has also played for the Seattle Seahawks and New York Jets.

== Early life ==
Born and raised in Richmond, Virginia, Brown attended its Hermitage High School and lettered in football, basketball, and track. He was teammates with Fontel Mines. In basketball, he averaged 15 points and 12 rebounds per game. In track, he competed in the throwing events. He finished 4th in the 2003 Group AAA outdoor shot put competition. He recorded top-throws of 17.32 meters (56.8 ft) in the shot put and 44.68 meters (146.6 ft) in the discus throw.

Only 250 pounds (113 kg) coming out of high school, Brown was regarded as a three-star tight end prospect by Rivals.com.

== College career ==
After graduation from high school, Brown attended Virginia Tech in Blacksburg, where he played for Frank Beamer's Hokies. He redshirted as a true freshman (2003), then played in all thirteen games in 2004 and caught his first collegiate pass against the Western Michigan Broncos which went for a touchdown. In 2005, he moved from tight end to offensive tackle, where he started every game and played in 673 offensive snaps during the regular season.

As a junior in 2006, Brown earned second-team All-Atlantic Coast Conference recognition and was voted state Offensive Lineman/End of the Year by the Richmond Touchdown Club. During his senior season in 2007, Brown switched to left offensive tackle and earned second-team All-ACC honors and Offensive Lineman/End of the Year by the Richmond Touchdown Club for the second consecutive year.

== Professional career ==
Pre-draft measurables
Height	Weight	Arm length	Hand span	40-yard dash	10-yard split	20-yard split	20-yard shuttle	Three-cone drill	Vertical jump	Broad jump	Bench press
6 ft 4 1/8 in (1.93 m)	315 lb (143 kg)	34 1/4 in (0.87 m)	10 in (0.25 m)	5.03 s	1.71 s	2.90 s	4.52 s	7.54 s	32.5 in (0.83 m)	9 ft 0 in (2.74 m)	24 reps
All values from NFL Combine/Pro Day

=== Houston Texans ===
Brown was selected by the Houston Texans in the first round (26th overall) of the 2008 NFL draft. He was only the second Virginia Tech offensive lineman ever drafted in the first round of an NFL Draft, after Eugene Chung in 1992. Brown started all sixteen games as a rookie in 2008 and became the first Texans rookie lineman to start every game since Chester Pitts in 2002. In 2009, Brown protected the blind side of Houston Texans quarterback Matt Schaub who led the NFL with 4,770 passing yards and helped the offense set franchise records with 6,129 total yards and 388 points.

During the 2010 season, Brown started twelve games, allowing 6.5 sacks and zero holding penalties.

In 2011, Brown was listed on the USA Today All-Joe Team and was named second-team All-Pro by the Associated Press, not allowing a single sack or committing a holding penalty.

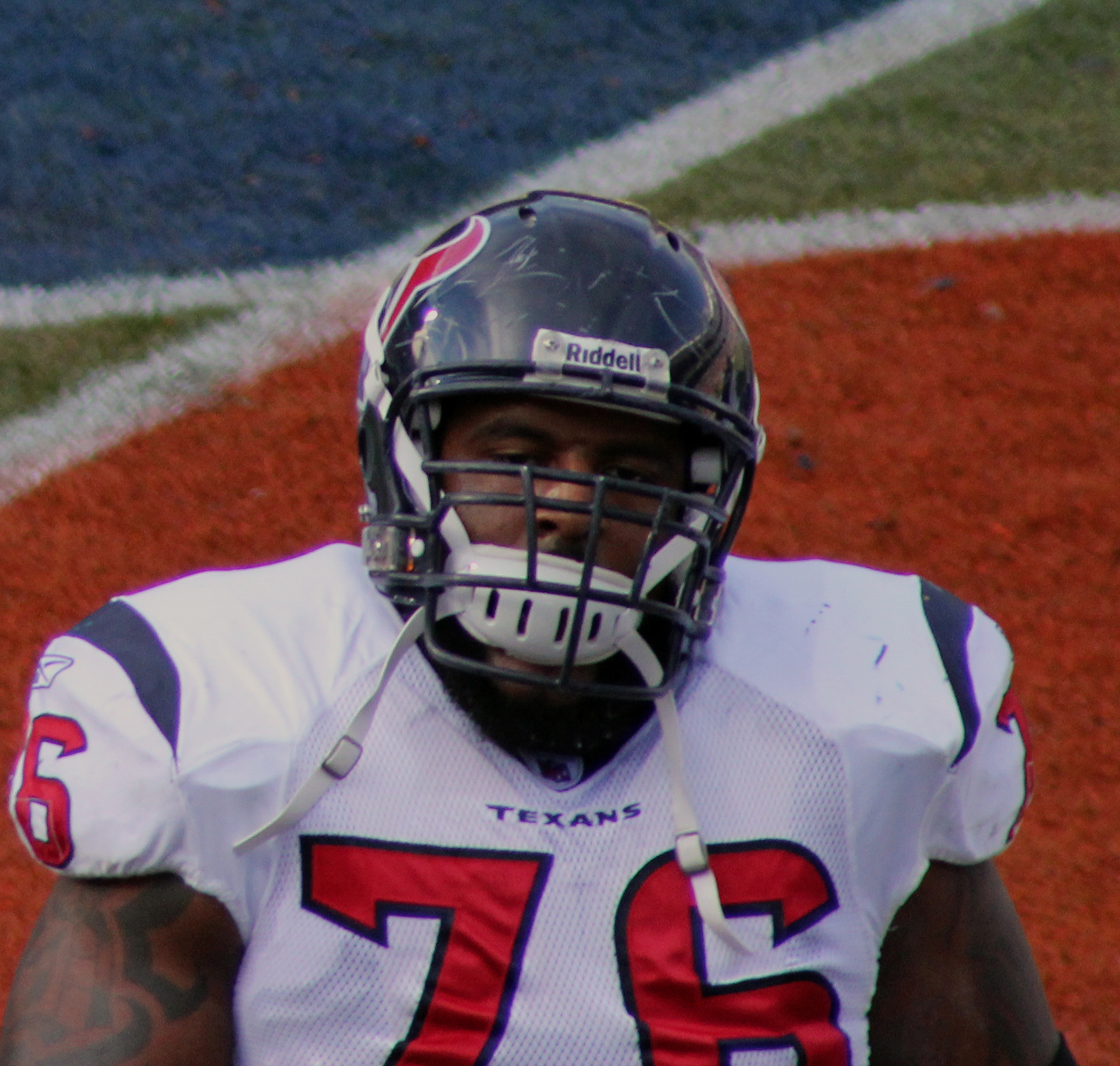
Brown with the Texans in 2010.

On August 16, 2012, Brown and the Texans agreed on a six-year, $53.4 million extension, with $22.08 million guaranteed. Brown was in the final year of his rookie contract; the extension kicked in at the conclusion of the 2012 season. Brown was named onto the 2012 All-Pro Team as a first-team selection and was voted to play in the 2013 Pro Bowl at the end of the 2012 season.

On January 3, 2016, Brown tore his quadriceps tendon during the first quarter of a game against the Jacksonville Jaguars. This injury required surgery and he was able to return for the 2016 season. Brown suffered a knee injury during the 2016 offseason and missed the first four games of 2016 before returning in Week 5 and started the final 12 games.

Brown did not attend the Texans' mandatory minicamp as part of a push for a new contract, even though he had two years left on the deal. On July 25, 2017, the Texans placed Brown on the reserve/did not report list after not showing up for the start of training camp. On October 23, Brown returned to the team after missing the first six games.

=== Seattle Seahawks ===
On October 30, 2017, Brown was traded to the Seattle Seahawks for cornerback Jeremy Lane and two draft picks (a 2018 fifth round and a 2019 second round). However the following day it was reported Lane had failed his physical and would no longer be part of the trade; instead the Seahawks would send a third-rounder in 2018 (Martinas Rankin) and a second-rounder in 2019 in exchange for Brown and a 2018 fifth round pick. On January 23, 2018, Brown was named to the 2018 Pro Bowl, replacing Philadelphia Eagles tackle Lane Johnson.

On July 28, 2018, Brown signed a three-year, $36.5 million contract extension with the Seahawks, keeping him under contract through the 2021 season. He was named second-team All-Pro for the 2018 season and later named to the 2021 Pro Bowl in his final season with the team.

=== New York Jets ===
On August 15, 2022, Brown signed a two-year, $22 million contract with the New York Jets. He was signed in order to replace Mekhi Becton after he suffered a knee injury and was placed on injured reserve. He was placed on injured reserve on September 10, 2022, after injuring his shoulder in practice. He was activated on October 8. Brown was placed on injured reserve by the Jets on January 7, 2023.

In 2023, Brown suffered a hip injury in Week 2 and was placed on injured reserve on September 23, 2023. He was activated on November 23.

=== NFL career statistics ===
Year	Team	Games	Starts
2008	HOU	16	16
2009	HOU	16	16
2010	HOU	12	12
2011	HOU	16	16
2012	HOU	16	16
2013	HOU	14	14
2014	HOU	16	16
2015	HOU	14	14
2016	HOU	12	12
2017	HOU	1	1
2017	SEA	9	9
2018	SEA	16	16
2019	SEA	12	12
2020	SEA	16	16
2021	SEA	17	17
2022	NYJ	12	12
2023	NYJ	5	3
Career		220	218

== Personal life ==
On November 22, 2011, Brown proposed to Devi Brown, a morning show host on Sirius XM's Shade 45.

On July 9, 2022, Brown was arrested for allegedly possessing a concealed weapon at Los Angeles International Airport and was released on $10,000 bond.
