= Jonathan Grimes =

American football player (born 1989)

No. 21, 41, 43
- Position: Running back

Personal information
- Born: December 21, 1989 (age 36); Palmyra, New Jersey, U.S.
- Listed height: 5 ft 10 in (1.78 m)
- Listed weight: 207 lb (94 kg)

Career information
- High school: Paul VI (Haddonfield, New Jersey)
- College: William & Mary (2008–2011)
- NFL draft: 2012: undrafted

Career history
- Houston Texans (2012)*; New York Jets (2012); Houston Texans (2012); Jacksonville Jaguars (2012); Houston Texans (2013–2016); Jacksonville Jaguars (2017)*
- * Offseason or practice squad member only

Career NFL statistics
- Rushing attempts: 141
- Rushing yards: 619
- Rushing touchdowns: 2
- Receptions: 53
- Receiving yards: 436
- Receiving touchdowns: 1
- Stats at Pro Football Reference

Jonathan Grimes (born December 21, 1989) is an American former professional football player who was a running back in the National Football League (NFL). He played college football for the William & Mary Tribe and was signed by the Houston Texans as an undrafted free agent in 2012. Grimes was also a member of the New York Jets and Jacksonville Jaguars.

== College career ==
Grimes played running back at the College of William & Mary from 2008 to 2011. He started all four years and became the school's leader in rushing attempts (936), rushing yards (4,541), kickoff returns (2,289 yards) and all purpose yards (7,955). Those totals were good enough to rank Grimes third all time in the Colonial Athletic Association for all purpose yards and sixth all time in rushing yards.

During his senior season in 2011, Grimes led the nation in all-purpose yards per game (228.18). He won a number of awards that year including Associated Press All-American (First-team), College Sporting News All-American (First-team), Sports Network All-American (Second-team), and finished fourth in the final voting for the Walter Payton Award.

== Professional career ==
=== Pre-draft ===
At his 2012 Pro Day, Grimes ran a 4.53-second 40-yard dash, which would have put him in the top ten among running backs at the NFL Combine that year. Grimes also had a 10-foot 5-inch broad jump and a 38-inch vertical jump, both of which would have been good enough for second place at the combine for his position.

=== Houston Texans (first stint) ===
Grimes was not selected in the 2012 NFL draft. However, he was considered a high-priority free agent and 10 NFL teams offered him a contract right after the draft. On April 29, 2012, Grimes signed with the Houston Texans as an undrafted free agent.

In his preseason debut against the Carolina Panthers, Grimes scored a three-yard touchdown, Houston's lone touchdown of the game, and finished with 37 yards on nine carries. Grimes was limited in Houston's second game against the San Francisco 49ers, carrying the ball twice for 22 yards.

Grimes again saw limited action the following week against the New Orleans Saints, recording four carries for 22 yards with the starters playing most of the game. In the Texans' last preseason game against the Minnesota Vikings, Grimes had 13 carries for 49 yards. Grimes was waived on August 31, but was signed to the practice squad the next day.

=== New York Jets ===
Grimes was signed by the New York Jets from the Texans' practice squad on September 25, 2012. Grimes was activated for his professional debut against the Houston Texans on October 8. However, he saw no playing time against his former team. Grimes was waived on October 30. He had two carries for six yards over three games.

=== Houston Texans (second stint) ===
Grimes was re-signed to the Texans' active roster on November 1, 2012, after Ben Tate suffered a hamstring injury. Grimes was waived on December 20 after primarily playing on special teams.

=== Jacksonville Jaguars (first stint) ===
Grimes was signed by the Jacksonville Jaguars on December 21, 2012. He was released by the Jaguars on August 30, 2013.

=== Houston Texans (third stint) ===
Grimes was re-signed to the Texans' active roster on December 18, 2013, after Ben Tate was placed on injured reserve. In Week 17 of the 2013 NFL season against the Tennessee Titans, Grimes started his first game, rushed 16 times for 50 yards, and had six receptions for 76 yards as the Texans lost by a score of 16–10.

In 2014, Grimes had 39 carries for 153 yards and caught six passes for 86 yards.

In 2015, Grimes had a career-high 56 carries for a career-high 282 yards and had a career-high 173 yards on 26 receptions. On January 3, 2016, against the Jacksonville Jaguars, he became the third player in Texans history to score a rushing and receiving touchdown in the same game. In the postseason, Grimes played and started his first playoff game, rushing four times for 15 yards and catching two passes for 12 yards as the Texans were shut out by the Kansas City Chiefs by a score of 30–0.

On March 18, 2016, Grimes signed a one-year contract worth $900,000 to remain with the Texans. He rushed for 105 yards and caught 13 passes for 94 yards. In the postseason, Grimes played in both playoff games, rushing 10 times for 56 yards and catching four passes for 43 yards.

=== Jacksonville Jaguars (second stint) ===
On August 11, 2017, Grimes was signed by the Jacksonville Jaguars. He was released on September 1.

== Personal life ==
Grimes is an avid singer and piano player. He started playing piano at age seven at his father's insistence. Grimes has two older siblings, a sister and a brother. He composed the opening theme and co-hosts Arian Foster's "Now What?" podcast.
