= Quintin Demps =

American football player (born 1985)

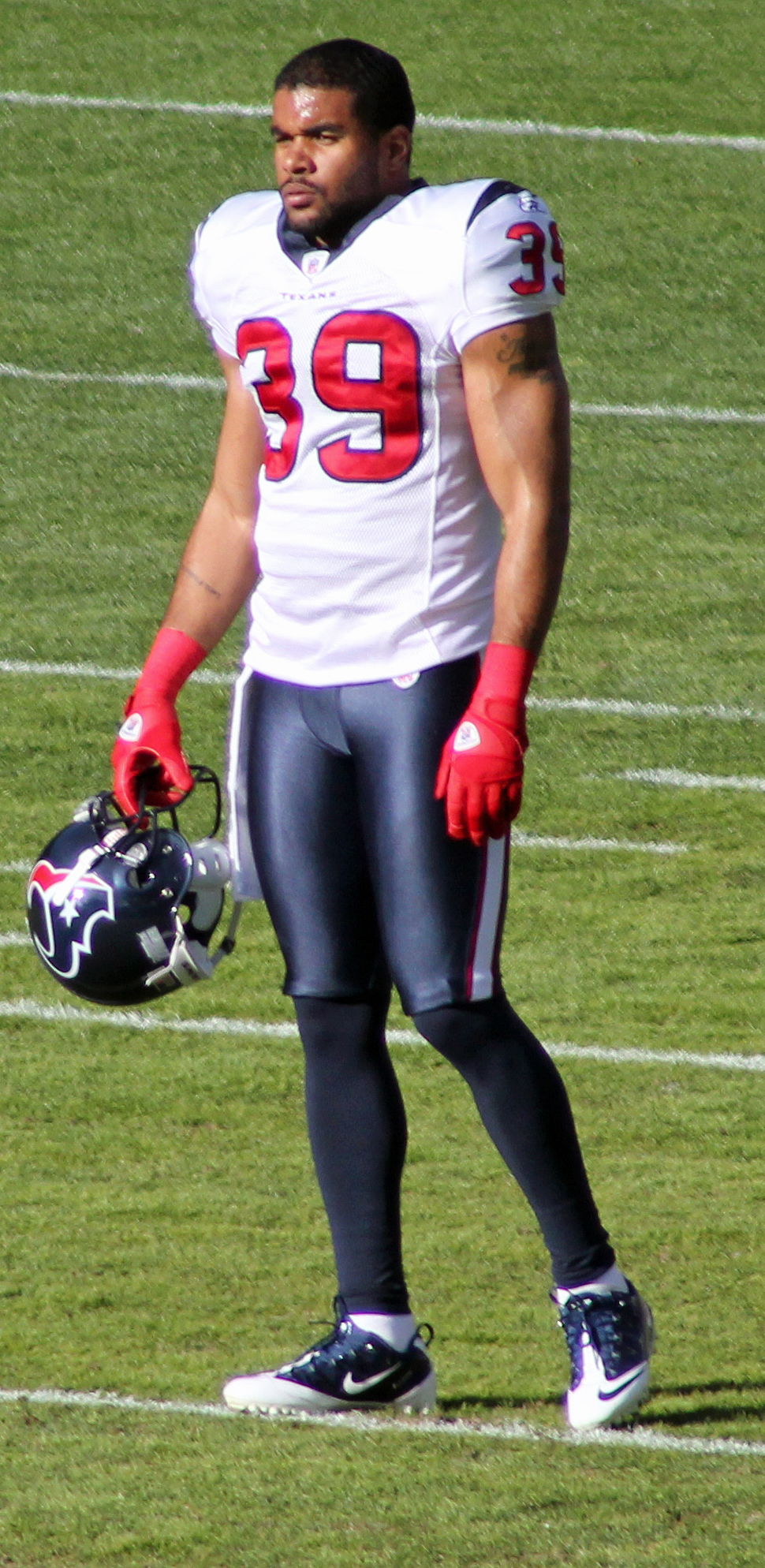
- Demps with the Houston Texans in 2010

Central State Marauders
- Title: Defensive pass game coordinator & safeties coach

Personal information
- Born: June 29, 1985 (age 41); San Antonio, Texas, U.S.
- Listed height: 6 ft 0 in (1.83 m)
- Listed weight: 203 lb (92 kg)

Career information
- High school: Roosevelt (San Antonio)
- College: UTEP
- NFL draft: 2008: 4th round, 117th overall pick

Career history

Playing
- Philadelphia Eagles (2008–2009); Hartford Colonials (2010); Houston Texans (2010–2012); Kansas City Chiefs (2013); New York Giants (2014); Houston Texans (2015–2016); Chicago Bears (2017)

Coaching
- Trinity International (2021) Defensive backs coach; Grayslake Central High School (2021–2022) Defensive coordinator; Judson (2022) Safeties coach; Judson (2023–2024) Head coach; Central State (OH) (2025–present) Defensive pass game coordinator & safeties coach

Awards and highlights
- 2× First-team All-C-USA (2006, 2007); Co-WAC Freshman of the Year (2004)

Career NFL statistics
- Total tackles: 312
- Sacks: 1.5
- Forced fumbles: 4
- Fumble recoveries: 3
- Interceptions: 18
- Total touchdowns: 3
- Stats at Pro Football Reference

Head coaching record
- Career: 1–18 (.053)

Quintin Lamon Demps (born June 29, 1985) is an American college football coach and former safety. He is the defensive pass game coordinator and safeties coach Central State University, Wilberforce, Ohio, a position he has held since 2025. Demps played college football at the University of Texas at El Paso (UTEP), and was selected by the Philadelphia Eagles in the fourth round of the 2008 NFL draft. He played in the National Football League (NFL) with the Eagles, Houston Texans, Kansas City Chiefs, New York Giants and Chicago Bears, and with the Hartford Colonials of United Football League (UFL). Demps served as head football coach at Judson University in Elgin, Illinois from 2023 to 2024.

== Early life ==
Demps was born in San Antonio, Texas. He attended Theodore Roosevelt High School in San Antonio and was a student and a letterman in football and track. In football, as a junior, he led his team to the District Title and was a second-team All-District 26-5A selection. As a senior, he was named as an All-District 26-5A selection, an All-Greater San Antonio selection, and as an All-State Honorable Mention selection. Demps graduated from Theodore Roosevelt High School in 2003.

== College career ==
Demps earned first-team All-Conference USA honors as a senior at UTEP in 2007, when he had a pair of 100-yard interception returns. Demps ranks second in school history with 17 interceptions.

== Professional career ==
=== Philadelphia Eagles ===
Demps was selected by the Philadelphia Eagles in the fourth round (117th overall) of the 2008 NFL draft. He signed a four-year contract with the team on May 30, 2008.

Demps proved to be a very good kick returner for the Eagles in 2008, finishing fourth in the NFL in kick return yards. He averaged 25.3 yards per kick return. He scored his first career touchdown in week 13 against the Baltimore Ravens with a 100-yard kickoff return touchdown. In his rookie season, Demps had 18 tackles and one sack.

According to former Eagles defensive coordinator Jim Johnson, Demps was the favorite to start at free safety for the Eagles in 2009. However, Macho Harris beat Demps for the starting job.

Demps was waived by the Eagles on September 4, 2010.

=== Hartford Colonials ===
Demps was signed by the Hartford Colonials of the United Football League on November 8, 2010.

=== Houston Texans (first stint) ===
Demps was signed by the Houston Texans on December 7, 2010, after the team placed defensive end Jesse Nading on injured reserve. On September 3, 2011, Demps was cut from the team. Demps re-signed with the Texans on October 25, 2011, after Danieal Manning was lost for 4–6 weeks due to a broken leg injury. Demps was again resigned on April 4, 2012, to a multi-year contract.

=== Kansas City Chiefs ===
Demps was signed by the Kansas City Chiefs on May 22, 2013.

=== New York Giants ===
Demps was signed by the New York Giants on March 16, 2014. Demps intercepted 4 passes in his 2014 year with the Giants.

=== Houston Texans (second stint) ===
On August 19, 2015, Demps signed with the Houston Texans for a one-year contract. On April 7, 2016, the Texans re-signed Demps to a one-year deal.

=== Chicago Bears ===
On March 10, 2017, Demps signed a three-year contract with the Chicago Bears. On September 29, 2017, Demps was placed on injured reserve after suffering a fractured forearm in Week 3.

On February 26, 2018, Demps was released by the Bears.

== NFL career statistics ==
Legend
**Bold**	Career high

=== Regular season ===
Year	Team	Games		Tackles					Interceptions					Fumbles			
Year	Team	GP	GS	Cmb	Solo	Ast	Sck	TFL	Int	Yds	TD	Lng	PD	FF	FR	Yds	TD
2008	PHI	**16**	0	18	16	2	**1.0**	1	0	0	0	0	1	**1**	0	0	0
2009	PHI	9	0	14	11	3	0.0	0	1	12	0	12	3	0	0	0	0
2010	HOU	2	0	1	1	0	0.0	0	0	0	0	0	0	0	0	0	0
2011	HOU	9	0	23	18	5	0.0	0	2	47	0	**42**	4	0	0	0	0
2012	HOU	12	0	36	27	9	0.0	**2**	0	0	0	0	5	0	1	0	0
2013	KAN	**16**	6	35	24	11	0.0	0	4	**61**	0	35	**9**	0	0	0	0
2014	NYG	**16**	9	57	**41**	16	0.0	1	4	19	0	10	7	**1**	0	0	0
2015	HOU	14	**13**	**61**	35	**26**	0.5	1	1	0	0	0	6	**1**	**2**	**33**	**1**
2016	HOU	13	**13**	55	38	17	0.0	1	**6**	54	0	19	**9**	**1**	0	0	0
2017	CHI	3	3	12	11	1	0.0	0	0	0	0	0	0	0	0	0	0
		110	44	312	222	90	1.5	6	18	193	0	42	44	4	3	33	1

=== Playoffs ===
Year	Team	Games		Tackles					Interceptions					Fumbles			
Year	Team	GP	GS	Cmb	Solo	Ast	Sck	TFL	Int	Yds	TD	Lng	PD	FF	FR	Yds	TD
2008	PHI	**3**	**1**	**9**	**6**	**3**	0.0	0	0	0	0	0	0	0	0	0	0
2011	HOU	2	**1**	3	3	0	0.0	**1**	0	0	0	0	0	0	0	0	0
2012	HOU	2	0	2	1	1	0.0	0	0	0	0	0	0	0	0	0	0
2013	KAN	1	0	1	1	0	0.0	0	0	0	0	0	0	0	0	0	0
2015	HOU	1	**1**	5	3	2	0.0	0	0	0	0	0	0	0	0	0	0
2016	HOU	1	**1**	2	2	0	0.0	0	0	0	0	0	0	0	0	0	0
		10	4	22	16	6	0.0	1	0	0	0	0	0	0	0	0	0

== Coaching career ==
In 2021, Demps was on staff at Trinity International University in Deerfield, Illinois and Grayslake Central High School in Grayslake, Illinois. The next year, he served as the safeties coach at Judson at Judson University in Elgin, Illinois. Demps was named the head football coach at Judson University in Elgin, Illinois on January 24, 2023.

== Head coaching record ==
Year	Team	Overall	Conference	Standing	Bowl/playoffs
Judson Eagles (Mid-States Football Association) (2023–2024)
2023	Judson	0–9	0–6	6th (MWL)	
2024	Judson	1–9	0–5	6th (MWL)	
Judson:		1–18	0–11		
Total:		1–18			
