= Kevin Johnson (cornerback) =

American football player (born 1992)

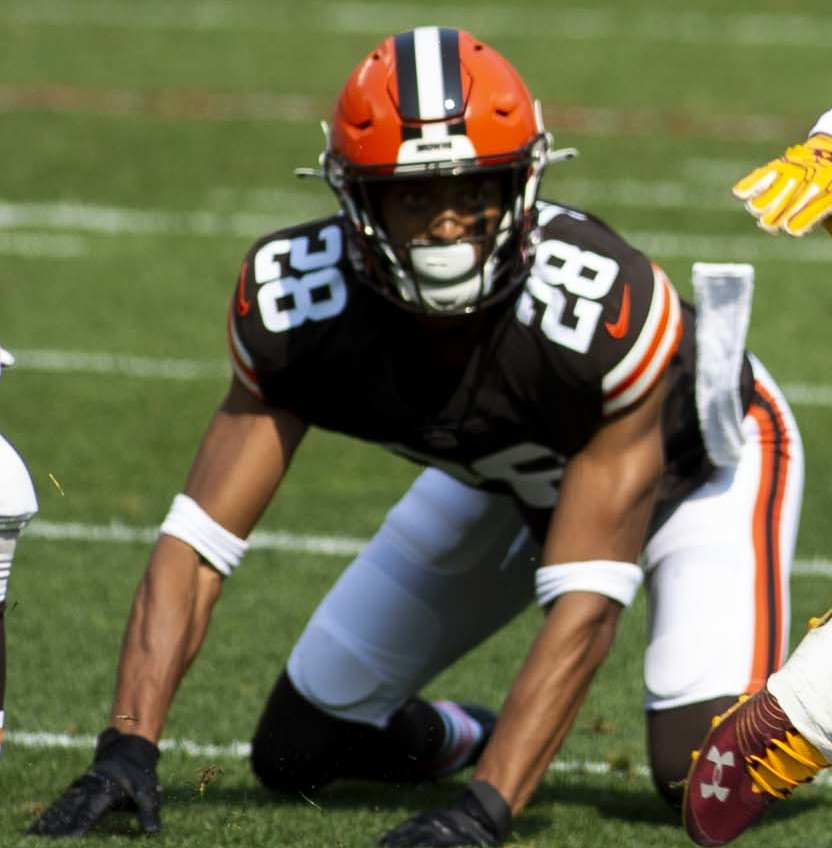
- Johnson with the Cleveland Browns in 2020

No. 30, 29, 28
- Position: Cornerback

Personal information
- Born: August 5, 1992 (age 34); Clarksville, Maryland, U.S.
- Listed height: 6 ft 0 in (1.83 m)
- Listed weight: 185 lb (84 kg)

Career information
- High school: Clarksville (MD) River Hill
- College: Wake Forest (2010–2014)
- NFL draft: 2015: 1st round, 16th overall pick

Career history
- Houston Texans (2015–2018); Buffalo Bills (2019); Cleveland Browns (2020); Tennessee Titans (2021)*
- * Offseason or practice squad member only

Career NFL statistics
- Total tackles: 199
- Sacks: 1.5
- Forced fumbles: 1
- Fumble recoveries: 2
- Pass deflections: 22
- Interceptions: 1
- Stats at Pro Football Reference

Kevin Johnson (born August 5, 1992) is an American former professional football player who was a cornerback for six seasons in the National Football League (NFL). He played college football for the Wake Forest Demon Deacons and was selected by the Houston Texans in the first round of the 2015 NFL draft.

== Early life ==
Johnson attended River Hill High School in Clarksville, Maryland, where he played both cornerback and running back.

Considered a three-star recruit by ESPN.com, Johnson was listed as the No. 45 cornerback in the nation in 2010. He committed to Wake Forest University to play college football.

== College career ==
Johnson attended Wake Forest from 2010 to 2014. As a true freshman, he played in 11 games with five starts. In 2011, he redshirted after being ruled academically ineligible. He returned in 2012 as a starter and remained as the starter throughout his senior season. Johnson finished his career with 189 tackles and seven interceptions.

== Professional career ==
=== Pre-draft ===
Coming out of college, analysts projected Johnson to be a first round draft choice. He was ranked the second best cornerback out of the 212 available in the 2015 NFL draft by NFLDraftScout.com. Johnson attended the NFL Combine and completed all the drills and workouts but chose not to do the bench press. At Wake Forest's Pro Day, he only performed positional drills after being satisfied with his combine performance. Representatives and scouts from 22 NFL teams attended his pro day, including defensive back coaches from the Pittsburgh Steelers, Minnesota Vikings, Philadelphia Eagles, and Tennessee Titans. He also attended private workouts and visits with multiple teams, including the Dallas Cowboys and Baltimore Ravens.

External videos
- Johnson's NFL Combine workout
- Kevin Johnson's 40-yard dash

Pre-draft measurables
Height	Weight	Arm length	Hand span	Wingspan	40-yard dash	10-yard split	20-yard split	20-yard shuttle	Three-cone drill	Vertical jump	Broad jump
6 ft 0 1/4 in (1.84 m)	188 lb (85 kg)	31 in (0.79 m)	8 3/8 in (0.21 m)	6 ft 1 1/2 in (1.87 m)	4.52 s	1.59 s	2.63 s	3.89 s	6.79 s	41.5 in (1.05 m)	10 ft 10 in (3.30 m)
All values from NFL Combine

=== Houston Texans ===
==== 2015 ====
The Houston Texans selected Johnson in the first round (16th overall) of the 2015 NFL draft. He was the second cornerback selected in 2014, behind Michigan State's Trae Waynes (11th overall). On May 8, 2015, the Texans signed Johnson to a fully guaranteed four-year, $10.04 million contract with a signing bonus of $5.50 million.

External videos
- Texans select Johnson 16th overall

Throughout training camp, he competed against A. J. Bouye for the job as the third cornerback on the depth chart. Head coach Bill O'Brien named Johnson the third cornerback on the Texans' depth chart, behind veterans Johnathan Joseph and Kareem Jackson.

He made his professional debut in the Texans' season opener against the Kansas City Chiefs and recorded two solo tackles in the 27–20 loss. On October 4, 2015, he made a season-high five solo tackles in his first career start in a 48–21 loss to the Atlanta Falcons. The next game, Johnson had his second consecutive start and made five combined tackles in a 27–20 loss to the Indianapolis Colts. In Week 8, Johnson had one of the best games of his rookie year when he recorded a season-high six combined tackles and a pass deflection, and intercepted Tennessee Titans quarterback Zach Mettenberger for his first and only career interception. He returned the interception for 22 yards and helped the Texans defeat the Titans, 20–6. Johnson finished his rookie season with a total of 54 combined tackles, nine pass deflections, and an interception while playing in all 16 games and starting ten.

==== 2016 ====
The following season, Johnson returned as the Texans' third cornerback and made two solo tackles in their season-opening victory over the Chicago Bears. The following week, he made four solo tackles in a 19–12 victory over the Chiefs. On October 2, 2016, he made his first start of the season and racked up two solo tackles during the Texans' 27–20 win over the Titans. On October 16, 2016, Johnson recorded a career-high nine solo tackles, one assisted tackle, and a pass deflection in the Texans' 26–23 defeat of the Colts. He broke his foot during the game and was placed on injured-reserve on October 22, 2016. In his absence, Bouye emerged as a sufficient replacement.

Johnson finished his second season with 25 combined tackles and three pass deflections in six games and three starts.

==== 2017 ====
Johnson entered training camp competing with Jackson for the job as the starting cornerback after Bouye signed with the Jacksonville Jaguars.

He started the Texans' season-opener against the Jaguars and recorded five combined tackles during their 29–7 loss. The following week, he recorded four combined tackles in a 13–9 victory over the Cincinnati Bengals. He left during the third quarter after suffering a sprain to his MCL and was estimated to miss the next four-six weeks. On October 29, 2017, he played in his first game since returning from his MCL injury and recorded five combined tackles and deflected a pass during a 41–38 loss to the Seattle Seahawks. Jackson earned Johnson's starting cornerback job during his absence and remained the starter after his return. He played in 12 games overall in 2017, starting four, recording 45 tackles and two pass deflections.

==== 2018 ====
On April 30, 2018, the Texans picked up the fifth-year option on Johnson's contract. In Week 1 against the New England Patriots, Johnson suffered a concussion and was placed on injured reserve on September 12, 2018.

On March 5, 2019, Johnson was released by the Texans.

=== Buffalo Bills ===
On March 11, 2019, the Buffalo Bills signed Johnson to a one-year deal. He played in 16 games with one start, recording 36 tackles, five passes defended, and one sack.

=== Cleveland Browns ===
On April 4, 2020, Johnson signed a one-year contract with the Cleveland Browns. He was placed on the reserve/COVID-19 list by the team on January 2, 2021, and activated on January 13.

=== Tennessee Titans ===
Johnson signed with the Titans on March 22, 2021. He announced his retirement on June 4, 2021.

== NFL career statistics ==
Legend
**Bold**	Career high

=== Regular season ===
Year	Team	Games		Tackles					Interceptions					Fumbles			
Year	Team	GP	GS	Cmb	Solo	Ast	Sck	TFL	Int	Yds	TD	Lng	PD	FF	FR	Yds	TD
2015	HOU	**16**	**10**	**54**	**48**	6	0.0	**3**	**1**	**22**	0	**22**	**9**	0	0	0	0
2016	HOU	6	3	25	22	3	0.0	1	0	0	0	0	3	0	**1**	**53**	0
2017	HOU	12	4	45	35	10	0.0	1	0	0	0	0	2	0	0	0	0
2018	HOU	1	1	4	1	3	0.0	0	0	0	0	0	0	0	0	0	0
2019	BUF	**16**	1	36	25	11	**1.0**	1	0	0	0	0	5	0	0	0	0
2020	CLE	13	6	35	22	**13**	0.5	0	0	0	0	0	3	**1**	**1**	0	0
		64	25	199	153	46	1.5	6	1	22	0	22	22	1	2	53	0

=== Playoffs ===
Year	Team	Games		Tackles					Interceptions					Fumbles			
Year	Team	GP	GS	Cmb	Solo	Ast	Sck	TFL	Int	Yds	TD	Lng	PD	FF	FR	Yds	TD
2015	HOU	**1**	**1**	3	2	1	0.0	0	0	0	0	0	0	0	0	0	0
2019	BUF	**1**	**1**	**9**	**7**	**2**	0.0	0	0	0	0	0	0	0	0	0	0
2020	CLE	**1**	**1**	5	5	0	0.0	0	0	0	0	0	0	0	0	0	0
		3	3	17	14	3	0.0	0	0	0	0	0	0	0	0	0	0

== Personal life ==
Johnson is childhood friends with former NFL wide receiver Michael Campanaro. They attended high school and college together.
