= Pokey Chatman =

American basketball player and coach

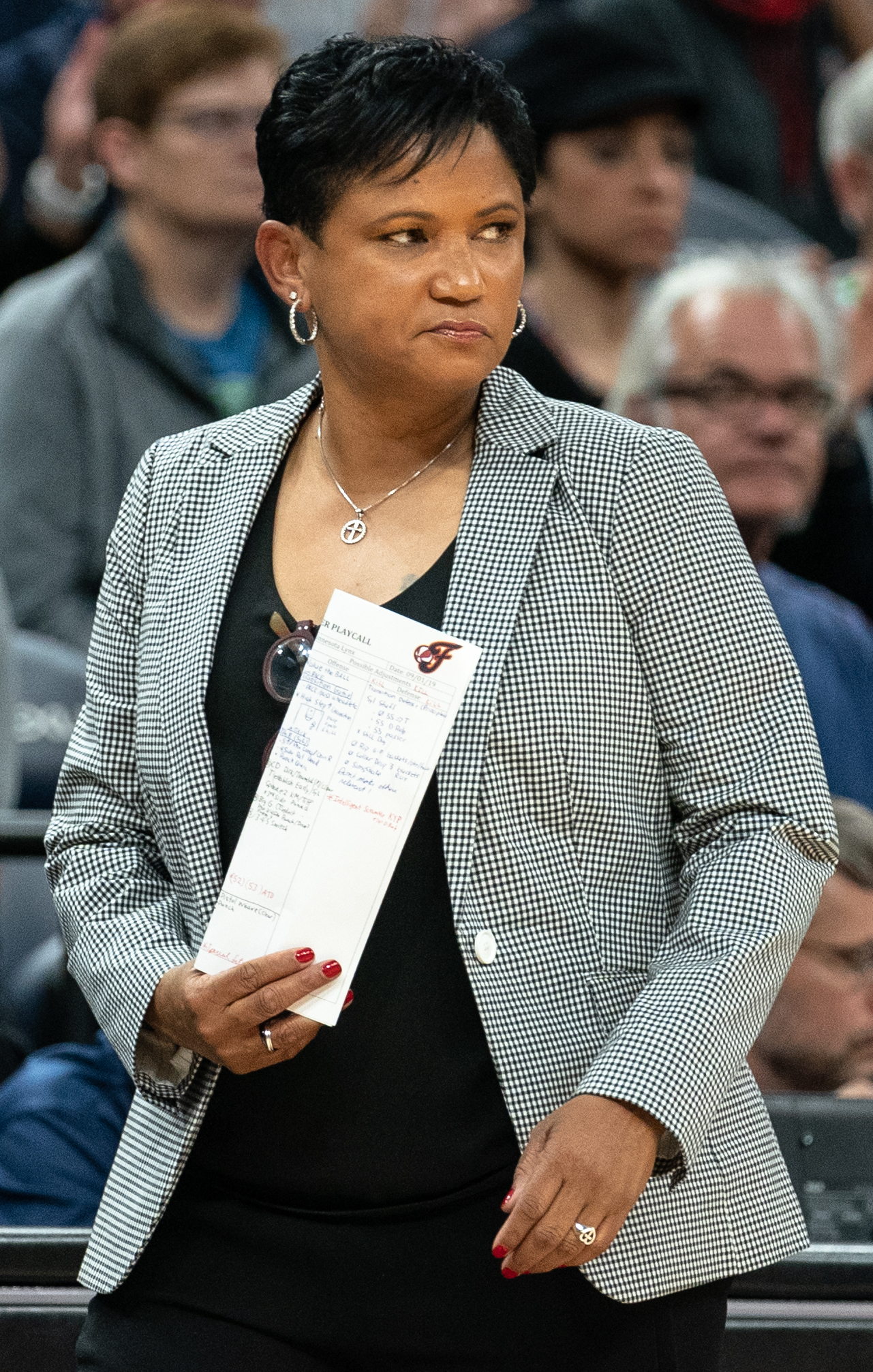
- Chatman in 2019

Personal information
- Born: June 18, 1969 (age 57) Ama, Louisiana, U.S.

Career information
- High school: Hahnville (Boutte, Louisiana)
- College: LSU (1987–1991)
- Coaching career: 1992–present

Career history

Coaching
- 1992–2004: LSU (assistant)
- 2004–2007: LSU
- 2008–2010: WBC Sparta&K
- 2011–2016: Chicago Sky
- 2017–2019: Indiana Fever
- 2022–2025: Seattle Storm (assistant)
- 2024–present: Brazil

Career highlights
- All-American – Kodak, USBWA (1991); SEC Tournament MVP (1991); 3x First-team All-SEC (1989–1991); SEC All-Freshman Team (1988)
Medals
Women's basketball
Representing the United States
FIBA Under-18 Americas Championship
Gold medal – first place	1988 Brazil	Team
Assistant coach for United States
World University Games
Gold medal – first place	2005 İzmir	Team competition

Dana "Pokey" Chatman (born June 18, 1969) is an American basketball coach and former player which is the head coach of the Brazilian women's national team. She's was last an assistant coach for the Seattle Storm in the Women's National Basketball Association (WNBA). Chatman is the former head coach of the Indiana Fever and Chicago Sky of the WNBA. She is also the former head coach of the LSU Lady Tigers basketball team and the Spartak Moscow women's basketball team.

Chatman spent the first 20 years of her adult life at LSU as a player (1987–1991), student assistant (1991–1992), assistant coach (1992–2004) and head coach (2004–2007). After succeeding longtime coach Sue Gunter in 2004, Chatman led the Lady Tigers to three consecutive NCAA Final Fours in 2004 (as acting head coach for the ailing Gunter), 2005, and 2006.

Chatman resigned from her post at LSU on March 7, 2007, amid allegations of an inappropriate relationship with a former player that were alleged to have begun when Chatman was coaching the player.

== Early life and high school career ==
Dana Chatman was born on June 18, 1969 in Ama, Louisiana.

She played point guard at Hahnville High School and was a five-time AAU All-American. She is recognized for scoring the first 3-point shot in a high school game for the state of Louisiana.

== Career ==
=== LSU playing career ===
The 1991 Kodak All-American point guard played for Gunter from 1987 to 1991, starting all but one game and setting the all-time steals (346) and assists (570) records at LSU. Her assist record was broken in the 2003–2004 season by Temeka Johnson. Chatman played in the NCAA tournament four times and posted a record of 82–38 as a player. She was a three-time All-SEC selection and led the Lady Tigers to their first ever SEC Tournament title in 1991, where she was the tournament's Most Valuable Player (MVP).

=== LSU statistics ===
Legend
GP	Games played	GS	Games started	MPG	Minutes per game
FG%	Field goal percentage	3P%	3-point field goal percentage	FT%	Free throw percentage
RPG	Rebounds per game	APG	Assists per game	SPG	Steals per game
BPG	Blocks per game	PPG	Points per game	**Bold**	Career high

Year	Team	GP	Points	FG%	FT%	RPG	PPG
1987-88	LSU	29	290	38.2%	81.8%	3.3	10.0
1988-89	LSU	30	485	**43.7%**	83.9%	3.6	16.2
1989-90	LSU	30	475	41.5%	**84.5%**	3.6	15.8
1990-91	LSU	**31**	**576**	**43.7%**	80.7%	**4.3**	**18.6**
TOTALS		120	1826	42.1%	82.7%	3.7	15.2

=== LSU coaching career ===
After serving as a student assistant with the Lady Tigers for a season (1991–1992), Chatman was named a full-fledged assistant coach before the 1992–1993 season. She was promoted to associate head coach in 1999. In 2003–2004, head coach Sue Gunter took a medical leave of absence in the middle of the season. Chatman, in her 14th season on the coaching staff, was named interim coach. She led the Tigers to a 15–5 record (27–8 overall) and the first Final Four in school history. However, LSU credits the entire season to Gunter.

By the end of the season, it was obvious that Gunter would not be able to return. She announced her retirement on April 27, and Chatman was named the fourth head coach in school history.

==== Head coach ====
In Chatman's first season as head coach, she led the Lady Tigers to a 33–3 record, an undefeated SEC regular season title (14–0), and the program's second consecutive Final Four, falling to eventual national champion Baylor in the semifinals. In the 2005–2006 season, the Lady Tigers finished with a 31–4 record, captured their second consecutive SEC regular season title (13–1), and reached their third straight Final Four, this time losing to Duke. Chatman's 47–3 record is the second best record through 50 games in women's basketball history. Only Hall of Fame coach Leon Barmore, the former Louisiana Tech head coach, had a better record (48–2).

Chatman won numerous awards, including the Black Coaches Association's Coach of the Year in 2004 and 2005; the 2005 USBWA National Coach of the Year, the 2005 Russell/WBCA National Coach of the Year; the 2005 Naismith National Coach of the Year; the 2005 Victor Award Female Coach of the Year; the 2005 SEC Coach of the Year; and the 2005 Louisiana Coach of the Year.

In 2005, Chatman served as the assistant coach for the USA Women's World University Games Team, which won the gold medal. Chatman also won a medal as a player on the 1990 USA Select Team.

Chatman was inducted into the LSU Hall of Fame in 1998.

==== Resignation as LSU head coach ====
Chatman resigned as the head women's basketball coach at LSU on March 7, 2007, after school officials became aware of an alleged inappropriate sexual relationship between Chatman and a former player. Former LSU assistant coach Carla Berry, a college teammate of Chatman's, reported the alleged relationship to the university in February. Assistant coach Bob Starkey was named interim coach and led the team during the 2007 NCAA Women's Division I Basketball Tournament, in which the Tigers made their fourth consecutive Final Four.

Chatman claimed that after LSU learned about the alleged relationship, it conducted a cursory investigation before giving her an ultimatum—resign within two hours or be fired. She initially demanded to be paid the remaining $900,000 on her contract. Ultimately, LSU and Chatman settled out of court for $160,000.

=== Spartak ===
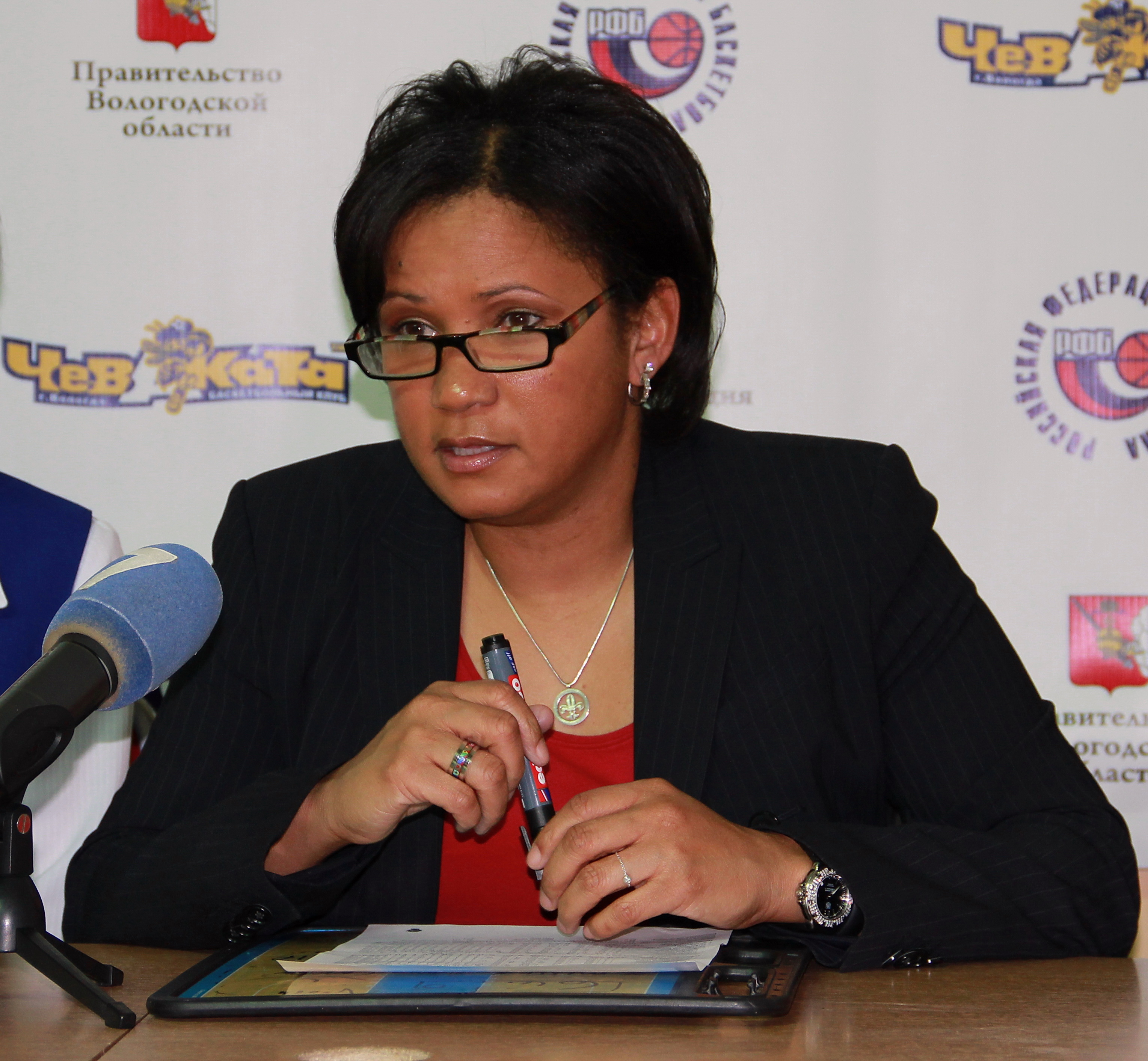
Pokey Chatman in Russia

In August 2007 she signed as assistant coach of the Women's Basketball Club Spartak Moscow Region (who had just won the 2007 Euroleague Women's Final). Spartak won the next three championships and in 2010, as the head coach, Chatman led the team to a 16–0 Euroleague record and their fourth straight Euroleague Championship.

=== Chicago Sky ===
On October 29, 2010, Chatman was named the general manager and head coach of the Chicago Sky of the WNBA. She was let go by the Sky in October 2016.

=== Indiana Fever ===
On November 18, 2016, Chatman was announced as the new head coach of the Indiana Fever. She assumed the role after Stephanie White left to accept the head coaching job at Vanderbilt. On September 10, 2019, Chatman was fired as general manager and head coach of the Indiana Fever of the WNBA.

=== Seattle Storm ===
On January 21, 2022, Chatman was announced as an assistant coach of the Seattle Storm of the WNBA.

=== Brazil's national team ===
On 11 December 2024, Chatman was officially announced as the head coach of the Brazilian women's national team.

== USA Basketball ==
=== As player ===
Chatman was a member of the USA Women's U18 team which won the gold medal at the FIBA Americas Championship in Sao Paulo, Brazil. The event was known as the Junior World Championship Qualifying Tournament at the time. The event was held in August 1988, when the USA team defeated the host team Brazil by a score of 70–68 to win the championship.

=== As coach ===
Chatman served as an assistant coach of the USA Women's World University Games Team at the World University Games (also known as the Universiade) held in İzmir, Turkey, in August 2005. The team won their first game against the Czech Republic 88–64; the 24-point margin in that contest would be the closest any team would come to beating the USA until the gold-medal final. After defeating South Africa, China, and Poland to move on to the quarterfinals, they then beat Taiwan and Russia – each by more than 50 points. This set up the championship game with Serbia & Montenegro which the USA won 79–63 to complete a 7–0 record and win the gold medal.

== Head coaching record ==
Record table
Season	Team	Overall	Conference	Standing	Postseason
LSU (SEC) (2003–2007)
2003–04	LSU (interim)	15–5	8–4	2nd	NCAA Final Four
2004–05	LSU	33–3	14–0	1st	NCAA Final Four
2005–06	LSU	31–4	13–1	1st	NCAA Final Four
2006–07	LSU	26–7	10–4	T-3rd	Resigned before NCAA tournament
LSU:		105–19 (.847)	45–9 (.833)		
Total:		105–19 (.847)			
National champion Postseason invitational champion Conference regular season champion Conference regular season and conference tournament champion Division regular season champion Division regular season and conference tournament champion Conference tournament champion

Legend
Regular season	G	Games coached	W	Games won	L	Games lost	W–L %	Win–loss %
Playoffs	PG	Playoff games	PW	Playoff wins	PL	Playoff losses	PW–L %	Playoff win–loss %

Team	Year	G	W	L	W–L%	Finish	PG	PW	PL	PW–L%	Result
CHI	2011	34	14	20	.412	5th in East	-	-	-	-	Missed Playoffs
CHI	2012	34	14	20	.412	5th in East	-	-	-	-	Missed Playoffs
CHI	2013	34	24	10	.706	1st in East	2	0	2	.000	Lost Eastern Conference Semi-Finals
CHI	2014	34	15	19	.441	4th in East	9	4	5	.444	Lost WNBA Finals
CHI	2015	34	21	13	.618	2nd in East	3	1	2	.333	Lost Eastern Conference Semi-Finals
CHI	2016	34	18	16	.529	2nd in East	5	2	3	.333	Lost WNBA Semi-Finals
IND	2017	34	9	25	.265	6th in East	-	-	-	-	Missed Playoffs
IND	2018	34	6	28	.176	6th in East	-	-	-	-	Missed Playoffs
IND	2019	34	13	21	.382	6th in East	-	-	-	-	Missed Playoffs
Career		306	134	172	.438		19	7	12	.368	
