= LaRon Landry =

American football player (born 1984)

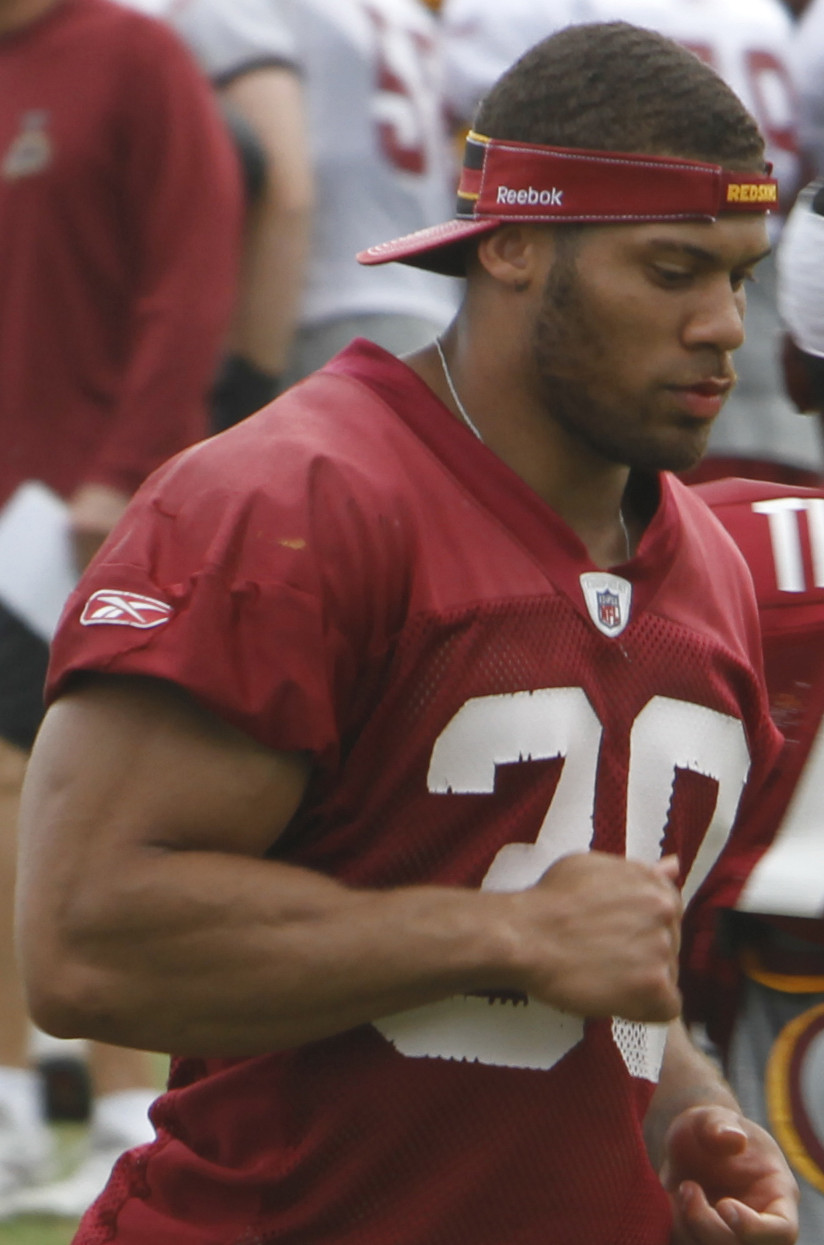
- Landry with the Washington Redskins in 2011

No. 30
- Position: Safety

Personal information
- Born: October 14, 1984 (age 42); Metairie, Louisiana, U.S.
- Listed height: 6 ft 0 in (1.83 m)
- Listed weight: 226 lb (103 kg)

Career information
- High school: Hahnville (Boutte, Louisiana)
- College: LSU (2003–2006)
- NFL draft: 2007: 1st round, 6th overall pick

Career history
- Washington Redskins (2007–2011); New York Jets (2012); Indianapolis Colts (2013–2014)

Awards and highlights
- Pro Bowl (2012); PFWA All-Rookie Team (2007); BCS national champion (2003); Consensus All-American (2006); Third-team All-American (2005); 2× First-team All-SEC (2005, 2006); 2× Second-team All-SEC (2003, 2004)

Career NFL statistics
- Total tackles: 559
- Sacks: 8
- Forced fumbles: 10
- Fumble recoveries: 5
- Interceptions: 6
- Defensive touchdowns: 1
- Stats at Pro Football Reference

LaRon Louis Landry (born October 14, 1984) is an American former professional football player who was a safety in the National Football League (NFL). He played college football for LSU Tigers, and earned consensus All-American honors. The Washington Redskins selected him with the sixth overall pick in the 2007 NFL draft. He also played for the New York Jets and Indianapolis Colts.

== Early life ==
Landry was born in Metairie, Louisiana to parents Frank and Rhonda Landry. He has two siblings, Derik and Dawan; who was a former NFL safety. Landry was raised in Ama, Louisiana, and attended Hahnville High School in Boutte. Rivals.com ranked him the No. 5 high school athlete in the country.

== College career ==
Landry attended Louisiana State University, where he majored in communication studies and played for coach Nick Saban and coach Les Miles's LSU Tigers football teams from 2003 to 2006. Credited with 48 straight starts for the Tigers, Landry finished his career with 315 tackles and 12 interceptions. His 12 interceptions left him with the third-highest total in school history, while his 315 tackles rank seventh in LSU history.

Landry made an immediate impact at LSU in 2003, starting ten games as a true freshman in 2003 while helping the Tigers win the BCS National Championship. He recorded 80 total tackles, 3.5 tackles for loss, three sacks, two interceptions, four pass-breakups, and one blocked kick. Landry was named to the Freshman All-SEC team, Second-team All-SEC and the First-team Freshman All-American Team.

During his sophomore season in 2004, the Tigers finished 16th in the nation, but Landry's standing remained high again. He was named to the All-SEC second-team and the SEC Academic Honor Roll. Landry started all twelve games, finishing the season with 92 total tackles, five tackles for loss, three sacks, four interceptions, six pass-breakups, and one forced fumble.

In 2005, LSU won the SEC Western Division and the Peach Bowl over Miami. Landry registered 70 total tackles, four tackles for loss, one sack, three interceptions, and eight pass-breakups. Landry was named a First-team All-SEC and Third-team All-American by the Associated Press and First-team All-SEC by the SEC coaches.

== Professional career ==
Pre-draft measurables
Height	Weight	Arm length	Hand span	40-yard dash	10-yard split	20-yard split	20-yard shuttle	Three-cone drill	Vertical jump	Broad jump
6 ft 0 1/2 in (1.84 m)	213 lb (97 kg)	32 in (0.81 m)	9 1/8 in (0.23 m)	4.37 s	1.55 s	2.57 s	4.36 s	7.11 s	37.5 in (0.95 m)	10 ft 3 in (3.12 m)
All values from NFL Combine/Pro Day

=== Washington Redskins ===
==== 2007 season ====
The Washington Redskins selected Landry in the first round of the 2007 NFL draft with the sixth overall pick. He was one of four LSU players taken in the first round of that draft, along with quarterback JaMarcus Russell, and wide receivers Dwayne Bowe and Craig Davis. On July 22, the Redskins signed Landry to a five-year, $41.5 million contract that included $17.5 million in guarantees.

At the beginning of the 2007 season, Landry was immediately named the starting strong safety opposite Pro Bowl free safety Sean Taylor. The combination at the safety position would be known to Redskins fans as "Area 51", a name derived from the combination of the numbers "21" and "30", the numbers of Taylor and Landry respectively. Landry proved his worth throughout the year without collecting an interception during the regular season, though he was noted for having a problem with disregarding coverage and going for the big hit. He recorded his first half sack in just the second week of the season and recorded his first unassisted sack on November 4 during a week 9 game against the New York Jets after a clean, full force hit behind the line of scrimmage on quarterback Kellen Clemens. He recorded his first interception in a Wild Card Playoff game versus the Seattle Seahawks, in which he recorded five tackles and two interceptions.

Taylor suffered an injury which kept him out of action in Week 11 and 12, and Landry was moved to the free safety position in his place. After Taylor was murdered at his home in Miami on November 27, Landry remained in the free safety position across from strong safety Reed Doughty. Landry started all 16 games, recording 95 total tackles (65 solo tackles, 32 assisted tackles), 1.5 sacks and six passes deflected. His impressive rookie season earned him a 2007 Pro Bowl alternate selection and was selected to the 2007 NFL All-Rookie Defensive Team. He also became the first Redskins rookie defensive player to start all 16 games since Champ Bailey in 1999.

==== 2008 season ====
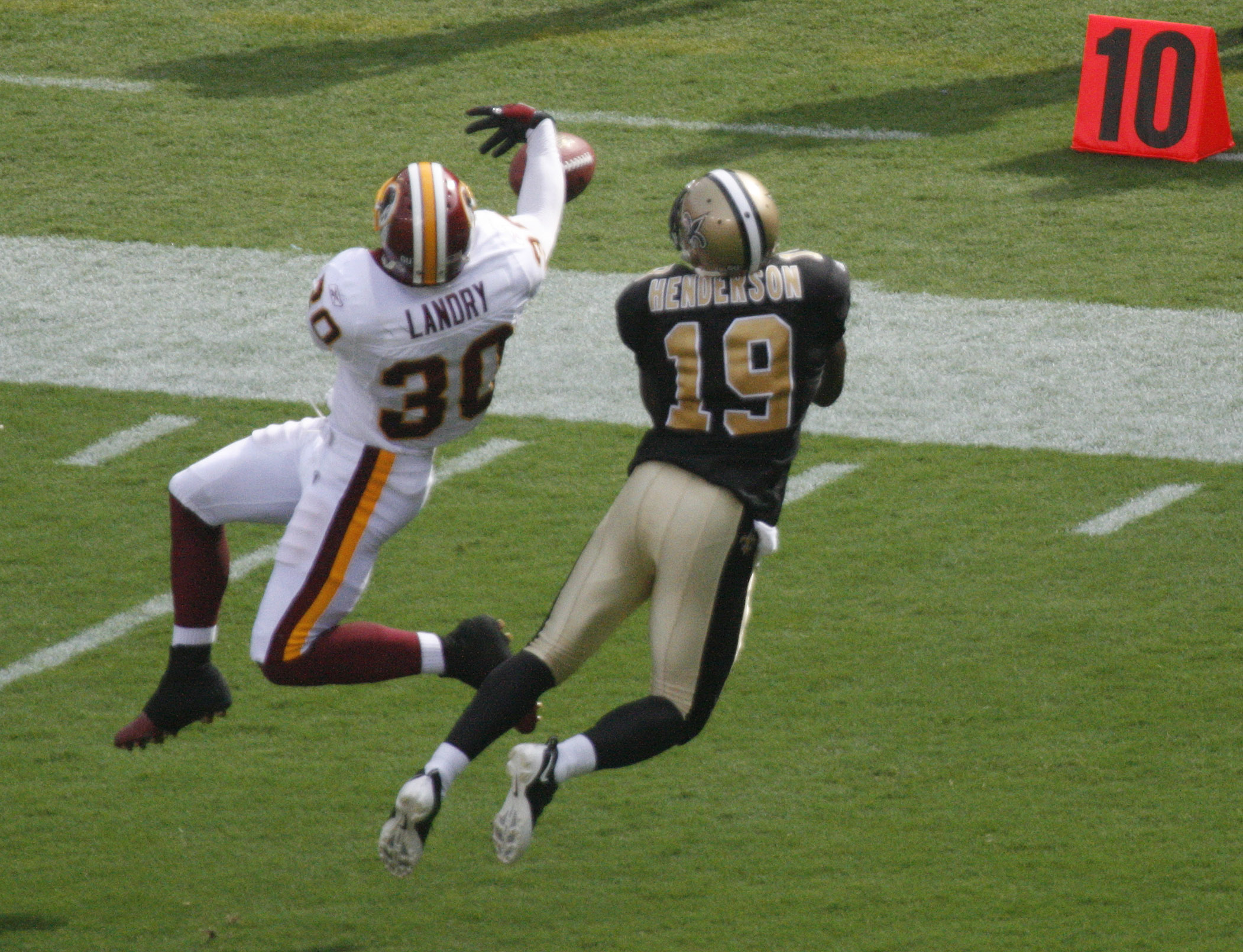
Landry covering Devery Henderson during the 2008 NFL season.

Landry made his first regular season interception in Week 12 against the Seattle Seahawks. He recorded his second regular season interception against the Baltimore Ravens. Landry finished the season with 65 total tackles and half a sack.

==== 2009 season ====
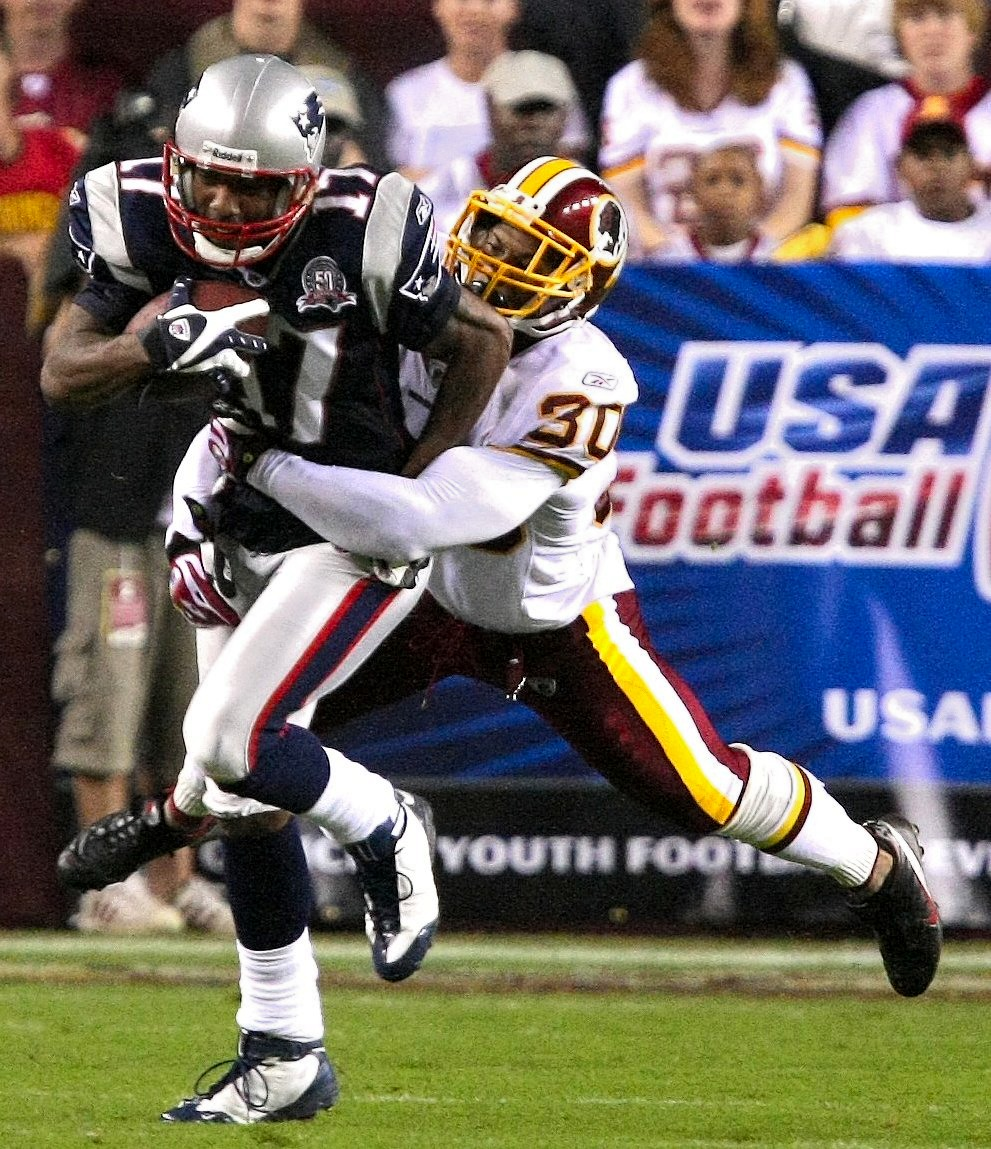
Landry playing in a 2009 preseason game against the Patriots.

Landry appeared in fifteen games for the Redskins and recorded his only interception in a victory over the Oakland Raiders in Week 14. His best statistical performance was in an overtime loss to the then undefeated New Orleans Saints in Week 13. Landry recorded 12 solo tackles including a sack. Landry also had three pass defenses in that game. Landry finished the season with 90 total tackles including 78 solo tackles.

==== 2010 season ====
After spending the previous two seasons at free safety, Landry was moved back to his natural position of strong safety and started off the season playing at a "Pro Bowl level" according to The Free-Lance Star. In Week 5, he was named the NFC Defensive Player of the Week for his performance against the Green Bay Packers, in which he collected 13 solo tackles, defended a pass, forced a fumble, and intercepted Packers' quarterback Aaron Rodgers in overtime. His interception would lead to the Redskins' game-winning field goal. Landry injured his Achilles tendon playing the Eagles in Week 10, and eventually landed on injured reserve December 13, ending his season having only played in 9 games. Landry avoided surgery on his left Achilles tendon and instead received platelet-rich plasma treatments. On December 15, 2011, Coach Mike Shanahan stated that he believed Landry "would’ve been defensive player of the year" for the 2010 season had he not been injured.

==== 2011 season ====
Landry was placed on the PUP list during all of preseason. He was taken off the list and placed on the active 53-man roster, but, due to a strained hamstring, missed the first two games of the season. He made his 2011 debut in Week 3 against the Dallas Cowboys, where he made a big hit on Laurent Robinson and later forced a fumble. In Week 12 against the Seattle Seahawks, after receiving a cut block, Landry was forced to leave in the first quarter. Despite coming back for the second half of the game, Landry suffered a groin injury that caused him to miss the next two games. On December 15, he was officially placed on injured reserve after being advised to get surgery on his left Achilles tendon, ending the last season of his rookie contract having played a total of eight games. On January 23, 2012, it was announced that Landry had decided to go with alternative medicine, receiving the stem cell treatment known as AminoMatrix on his left Achilles tendon in hope of avoiding surgery. The Redskins chose not to re-sign Landry, according to reports his departure from the team was mutual.

=== New York Jets ===
Landry reached an agreement with the New York Jets on March 19, 2012, on a one-year, $3.5 million contract with $700,000 in guaranteed money. By June 14, 2012, it was reported that Landry's Achilles tendon was fully healed, but the heel bone connected to the tendon was still healing. With the bone still healing, he was placed on the physically unable to perform list prior to the start of training camp. He was placed on the active roster again on July 26. He made a stellar debut as a Jet during the season opening win against the Buffalo Bills as he led the Jets' defense in tackles. He made his presence known by making an impressive tackle against Fred Jackson, which took him out for the rest of the game, and forcing a fumble that was recovered by Yeremiah Bell. He had another good performance in Week 3 against the Miami Dolphins after intercepting Ryan Tannehill, he ran the ball back for 18 yards and scored his first career touchdown. Late in the first half of the game, he also landed a hard tackle on Reggie Bush, which made him leave the rest of game. Landry was selected to the 2013 Pro Bowl on December 26, marking the first appearance of his career, having been selected only as a Pro Bowl alternate in 2007 and 2008. By the end of the season, Landry set new career highs of 100 combined tackles and four forced fumbles, as well as recording two interceptions, eight pass deflections, and one touchdown.

=== Indianapolis Colts ===
==== 2013 season ====
Landry signed a four-year, $24 million contract, with $14 million guaranteed, with the Indianapolis Colts on March 13, 2013. He played 12 games in 2013, and had 87 tackles and 2 pass deflections.

==== 2014 season ====
On September 29, 2014, Landry was suspended four games for violating the NFL policy on performance-enhancing drugs. On February 11, 2015, Landry was released by the Colts. After his release, Landry was suspended for the first 10 games of the 2015 season on March 6, 2015, for another violation of the NFL policy on performance-enhancing drugs.

On November 24, 2015, Landry was suspended for testing positive for PEDs, his third such violation of the league's performance-enhancing drug policy. This resulted in an indefinite ban as per league rules.

== NFL career statistics ==
=== Regular season ===
Season	Team	Games		Tackles						Interceptions					Fumbles
Season	Team	GP	GS	Comb	Total	Ast	Sck	SFTY	PDef	Int	Yds	Avg	Lng	TDs	FF
2007	Washington Redskins	16	16	95	63	32	1.5	–	6	–	–	–	–	–	0
2008	Washington Redskins	16	16	65	49	16	0.5	–	11	2	18	9.0	13	0	2
2009	Washington Redskins	15	15	90	78	12	1.0	–	6	1	12	12.0	12	0	2
2010	Washington Redskins	9	9	85	66	19	1.0	–	8	1	0	0.0	0	0	1
2011	Washington Redskins	8	8	48	35	13	1.5	–	0	–	–	–	–	–	1
2012	New York Jets	16	15	100	76	24	0.0	–	8	2	42	21.0	24	1	4
2013	Indianapolis Colts	12	12	87	62	25	0.0	–	2	–	–	–	–	–	0
2014	Indianapolis Colts	11	6	46	37	9	2.5	–	0	–	–	–	–	–	0
	Total	103	97	616	466	150	8.0	0	41	6	72	12.0	24	1	10

=== Postseason ===
Season	Team	Games		Tackles						Interceptions					Fumbles
Season	Team	GP	GS	Comb	Total	Ast	Sck	SFTY	PDef	Int	Yds	Avg	Lng	TDs	FF
2007	Washington Redskins	1	1	5	5	0	0.0	–	2	2	2	1.0	2	0	0
2013	Indianapolis Colts	2	2	15	9	6	0.0	–	0	–	–	–	–	–	0
2014	Indianapolis Colts	2	2	11	6	5	0.0	–	0	–	–	–	–	–	0
	Total	5	5	31	20	11	0.0	0	2	2	2	1.0	2	0	0

== Personal life ==
Landry from Ama, Louisiana, is the younger brother of former safety Dawan Landry, who was drafted by the Baltimore Ravens in the fifth round of the 2006 NFL draft. At a point during his career, he kept a pet white-faced capuchin monkey named Gucci.

During his time with the Redskins, Landry's fans and teammates began calling him "Dirty 30" for his jersey number and aggressive playing style. He was also nicknamed "Iron Man" by his Redskins teammates for his physique.

== Honors ==
- 2012 Pro Bowl
- 2010 NFC Defensive Player of the Week (Week 5)
- 2007 NFC Pro Bowl Alternate
- 2007 First-team All NFL Rookie Defense
- 2006 First-team All-American (AP)
- 2006 First-team All-SEC (AP)
- 2006 First-team All-SEC (SEC Coaches)
- 2006 Thorpe Award Semifinalist
- 2006 Senior Bowl
- 2005 Third-team All-American (AP)
- 2005 First-team All-SEC (SEC Coaches)
- 2005 Second-team All-SEC (AP)
- 2004 Second-team All-SEC (SEC Coaches)
- 2004 SEC Academic Honor Roll
- 2003 First-team Freshmen All-American (FWAA, College Football News)
- 2003 Second-team All-SEC (AP)
- 2003 Freshmen All-SEC Team (SEC Coaches, Knoxville News Sentinel, The Sporting News)
