= Ama, Louisiana =

Ama
- CDP
- Location of Ama in Louisiana
- Coordinates: 29°56′32″N 90°18′14″W
- Country: United States
- State: Louisiana
- Parish: St. Charles

Area
  - Total: 4.42 sq mi (11.46 km^{2})
  - Land: 3.50 sq mi (9.07 km^{2})
  - Water: 0.92 sq mi (2.39 km^{2})
- Elevation: 10 ft (3.0 m)

Population (2020)
  - Total: 1,290
  - Density: 368.4/sq mi (142.23/km^{2})
- Time zone: UTC-6 (CST)
  - Summer (DST): UTC-5 (CDT)
- Area code: 504
- FIPS code: 22-01780

Ama is a census-designated place (CDP) in St. Charles Parish, Louisiana, United States. Ama is on the West Bank of the Mississippi River, just west of the Jefferson Parish line. The population was 1,290 at the 2020 census.

== History ==
Ama was named in honor of Amazalie Perret, the postmaster's daughter.

== Geography ==
Ama is located at 29°56′32″N 90°18′14″W (29.942144, -90.303940). According to the United States Census Bureau, the CDP has a total area of 4.4 square miles (11 km^{2}), of which 3.6 square miles (9.3 km^{2}) is land and 0.9 square miles (2.3 km^{2}) (19.78%) is water.

== Demographics ==
Historical population
Census	Pop.	Note	%±
2000	1,285		—
2010	1,316		2.4%
2020	1,290		−2.0%
U.S. Decennial Census

Ama was first listed as a census designated place in the 2000 U.S. census.

According to the 2000 United States census, there were 1,285 people residing in Ama. By 2020, its population increased to 1,290. At the 2019 American Community Survey, there were 79.8 males per 100 females and the median age among its population was 40.

From 2010 census estimates to the 2020 census non-Hispanic or Latino whites and Black or African Americans have remained the largest racial and ethnic groups in the CDP, although multiracial Americans were also prominent. In 2000, the Ama's racial and ethnic makeup was 64.9% White, 34.4% Black or African American, 0.16% American Indian and Alaska Native, 0.16% Asian, 0.16% from some other race, 0.23% from two or more races, and 1.01% Hispanic or Latino American of any race.

Economically, the median income for a household in the CDP was $57,794; the CDP's mean income for a household was $65,775, up from a median of $41,691 in 2000. Among its population, 9.5% were approximately at or below the poverty line; 1.9% of families were below the poverty line in 2019.

== Education ==
St. Charles Parish Public School System operates public schools:

- Hahnville High School in Boutte

Previously the Ama School served the community.

== Notable people ==
- Dana "Pokey" Chatman, former LSU Head Women's Basketball Coach, Head Coach Of Russia's Spartak in Euroleague; Head Coach and General Manager of WNBA's Chicago Sky
- Dawan Landry, former American Football player, named to the 2006 Pro Football Weekly/Professional Football Writers of America All-Rookie Team
- LaRon Landry, former American Football player, the sixth overall selection in the first round of the 2007 NFL Draft by Washington
- Sabrina Le Beauf, actress, mostly known from The Cosby Show, as Sandra Huxtable
