= Hahnville, Louisiana =

Unincorporated community, St. Charles Parish

- Census-designated place
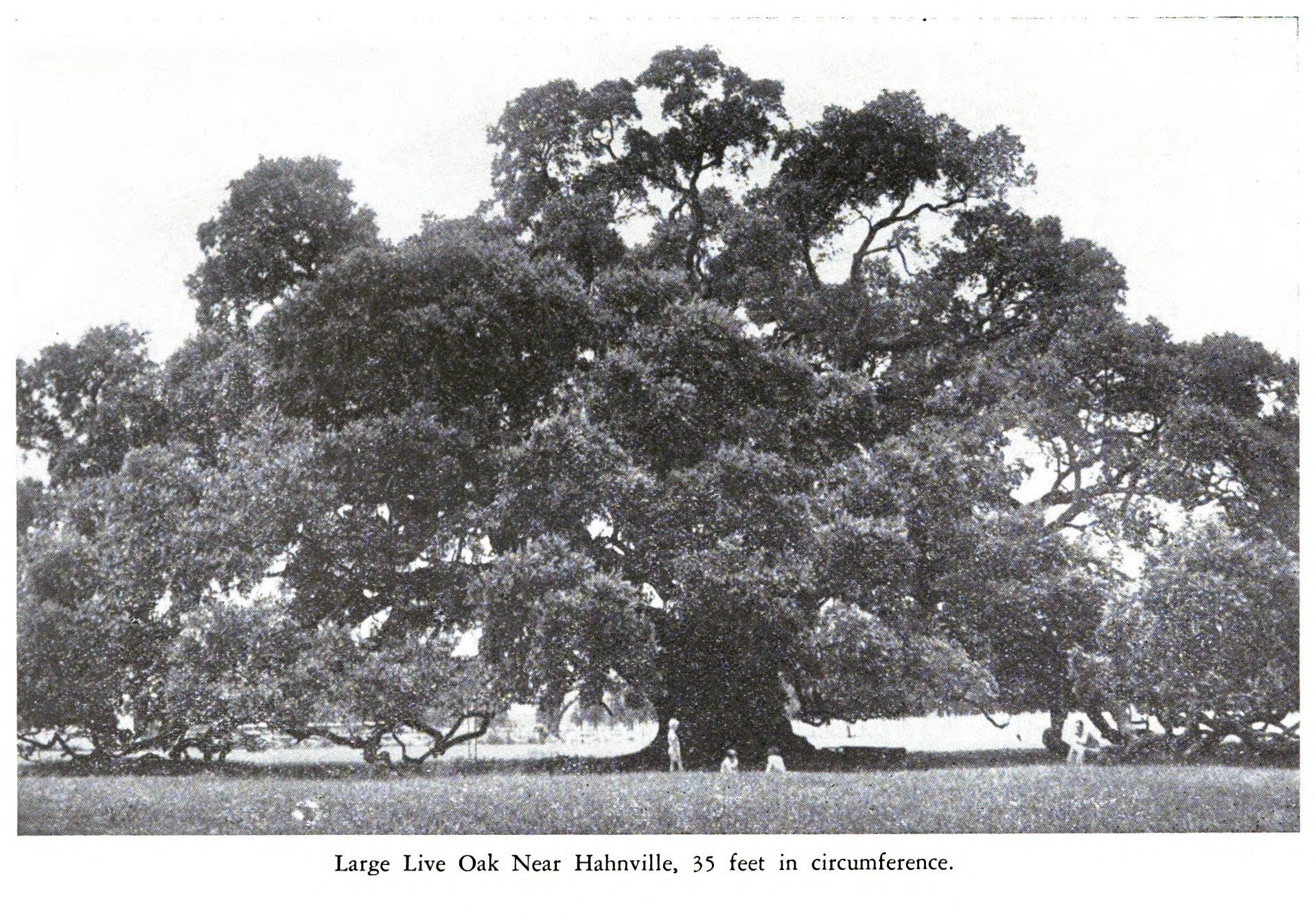
- Large live oak near Hahnville Louisiana c. 1938

- Location of Hahnville in Louisiana
- Coordinates: 29°58′01″N 90°24′36″W
- Country: United States
- State: Louisiana
- Parish: St. Charles
- Named for: Michael Hahn

Area
  - Total: 6.51 sq mi (16.86 km^{2})
  - Land: 5.56 sq mi (14.39 km^{2})
  - Water: 0.95 sq mi (2.46 km^{2})
- Elevation: 13 ft (4.0 m)

Population (2020)
  - Total: 2,959
  - Density: 532.4/sq mi (205.56/km^{2})
- Time zone: UTC−6 (CST)
  - Summer (DST): UTC−5 (CDT)
- ZIP Code: 70057
- Area code: 504
- FIPS code: 22-32510

Hahnville is a census-designated place (CDP) in and the parish seat of St. Charles Parish, Louisiana, United States. The population was 2,792 at the 2000 census and 2,959 in 2020. It was founded by former governor Michael Hahn.

== Geography ==
Hahnville is located at 29°58′1″N 90°24′36″W (29.967081, -90.410129).

According to the United States Census Bureau, the CDP has a total area of 8.8 square miles (23 km^{2}), of which 7.8 square miles (20 km^{2}) is land and 1.0 square mile (2.6 km^{2}) (11.79%) is water.

== History ==
In 1682, La Salle recorded the presence of a village of Quinipissa peoples in the vicinity of modern-day Hahnville. In the 1700s, German immigrants to the French colony of Louisiana began settling along the Mississippi upriver from New Orleans in what became known as the German Coast. In the early 1800s, following the sale of Louisiana, the United States established the St. Charles Courthouse in the area and a small community grew up around it. In February 1872, Thomas Sharpe began laying out a village near the courthouse, which he called Flaggville after district judge Othelle J. Flagg. Around the same time, former governor Michael Hahn, who had a sugar plantation upriver from Flaggville, began dividing his land to found Hahnville. Gradually "Hahnville" became the commonly accepted name for the larger area.

== Demographics ==
Historical population
Census	Pop.	Note	%±
1960	1,297		—
1970	2,483		91.4%
1980	2,947		18.7%
1990	2,599		−11.8%
2000	2,792		7.4%
2010	3,344		19.8%
2020	2,959		−11.5%
U.S. Decennial Census; 1950 1960 1970 1980; 1990 2000 2010

Hahnville first appeared as an unincorporated place in the 1960 U.S. census; and as a census designated place in the 1980 United States census.

Hahnville racial composition as of 2020
Race	Number	Percentage
White (non-Hispanic)	1,413	47.75%
Black or African American (non-Hispanic)	1,289	43.56%
Native American	14	0.47%
Asian	17	0.57%
Other/Mixed	65	2.2%
Hispanic or Latino	161	5.44%

As of the 2020 United States census, there were 2,959 people, 1,354 households, and 897 families residing in the CDP.

== Education ==
St. Charles Parish Public School System operates public schools:

- Hahnville High School in Boutte, on the west bank of the Mississippi River.

== Notable people ==
- LaRon Byrd (born 1989) – NFL wide receiver
- Jack Carey (1889–1934)– jazz trombonist
- Mutt Carey (1891–1948) – jazz trumpeter
- Michael Hahn (1830 –1886) – 19th-century state judge, governor and U.S. representative
- Claudell Harris Jr. (born 2002) – basketball player in the Israeli Basketball Premier League
- Mary Ann Vial Lemmon (born 1941) – U.S. federal judge
- Herb Simpson (1920–2015) – Negro league and minor league baseball player
