= Aaron Loup =

American baseball player (born 1987)

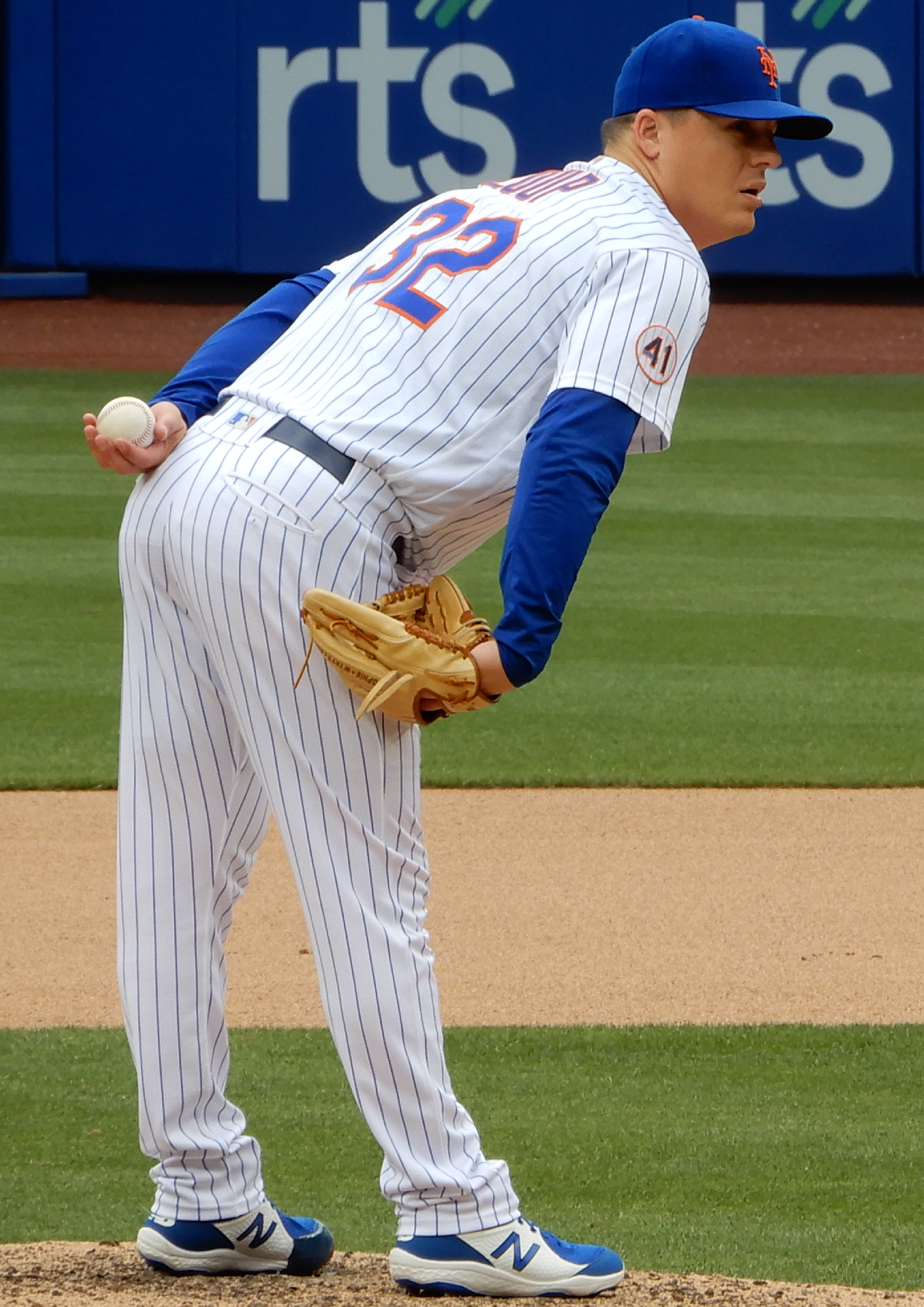
- Loup with the New York Mets in 2021
- Pitcher
- Born: December 19, 1987 (age 38); Raceland, Louisiana, U.S.
- Batted: Left Threw: Left

MLB debut
- July 14, 2012, for the Toronto Blue Jays

Last MLB appearance
- September 19, 2023, for the Los Angeles Angels

MLB statistics
- Win–loss record: 23–30
- Earned run average: 3.43
- Strikeouts: 480
- Stats at Baseball Reference

Teams
- Toronto Blue Jays (2012–2018); Philadelphia Phillies (2018); San Diego Padres (2019); Tampa Bay Rays (2020); New York Mets (2021); Los Angeles Angels (2022–2023)
Medals
Men's baseball
Representing United States
World Baseball Classic
Silver medal – second place	2023 Miami	Team

Aaron Christopher Loup (born December 19, 1987) is an American former professional baseball pitcher. He has previously played in Major League Baseball (MLB) for the Toronto Blue Jays, Philadelphia Phillies, San Diego Padres, Tampa Bay Rays, New York Mets, and Los Angeles Angels.

Born in Raceland, Louisiana, Loup played baseball at Hahnville High School and Tulane University, where he led his teams to several state playoff appearances and recorded a five-hit shutout. He was drafted by the Blue Jays out of Tulane in the ninth round of the 2009 draft.

After playing for three years with minor-league affiliates for the Toronto Blue Jays and being chosen for the 2012 Eastern League All-Star Game, Loup was called up to the Blue Jays as a replacement for Luis Pérez and retired all six batters he faced. He was later voted the 2012 Toronto Blue Jays Rookie of the Year by the Toronto chapter of the Baseball Writers' Association of America (BBWAA). Loup pitched 1 1/3 innings on Opening Day in 2013, and went on to win his first major league game on April 10 against the Detroit Tigers. He recorded his first two major league saves on April 12 and June 2, and led the Blue Jays to a win in an 18-inning game on June 8 after a pair of groundouts.

Loup is a southpaw whose pitching drastically improved after coaches told him to become a sidearm pitcher. His fastball has been noted as particularly effective against both left- and right-handed batters, but he continues to struggle with a changeup. Manager John Gibbons does not view Loup as a long reliever, but rather as a "situational, one-inning guy." He is known for his "relaxed" personality, which has improved after spending time with his teammates.

== Early life ==
Loup was born on December 19, 1987, in Raceland, Louisiana. His father and grandfather influenced his baseball interest the most when he was young, and he says that it was "just all baseball all the time", with "a little football". Loup said that when he was 13, "My dad had me in the backyard almost every day—or at least it seemed that way. I was always doing something, whether it was pitching off the mound or hitting in the cage. I wanted to play baseball and knew that I needed to work hard to get there. As a kid, I needed to be reminded of that sometimes." His baseball role models growing up were Greg Maddux, John Smoltz, and Tom Glavine.

Loup played baseball at Hahnville High School, where he led the Hahnville Fighting Tigers to four state playoff appearances. As a sophomore, he threw a complete-game no-hitter against Terrebonne High School. He then attended Tulane University, where he majored in digital design and played for the Tulane Green Wave from freshman year until his junior year, when he was drafted by the Toronto Blue Jays. As a freshman for the Green Wave, he held a 4.37 ERA and 36 strikeouts in 35 innings. As a sophomore, he held a 5.66 ERA in 47 2/3 innings, as well as pitching a perfect inning of relief on April 26, 2008. After the 2008 season, he played collegiate summer baseball with the Falmouth Commodores of the Cape Cod Baseball League. Before being drafted in his junior year, he had thrown 57 1/3 innings.

== Professional career ==
=== Draft ===
The Blue Jays drafted Loup in the ninth round of the 2009 Major League Baseball draft. Loup had shown a strong performance playing for the Tulane Green Wave and was the second Green Wave player to be drafted. Loup said of the event, "I had 20 people text message me before I even heard anything and then my phone rang and I got the call. It's exciting. They told me they would call me as soon as the draft was over and we would discuss details, so hopefully everything will shake out."

=== Minor league career ===
After the draft, Loup played for the Gulf Coast League Blue Jays in 2009. In the 2009 season, he held a 3.86 ERA and 19 strikeouts in 16 1/3 innings. In 2010, he was moved up to the Lansing Lugnuts, one of the Class A affiliates of the Blue Jays, where he held a 4.54 ERA and 73 strikeouts in 73 1/3 innings. On June 22, 2010, Loup was chosen a Mid-Season All-Star. He missed the last two months of the season with an unknown injury and began 2011 on the disabled list. In 2011, he was moved to the Dunedin Blue Jays, the Class A-Advanced Blue Jays affiliate, where he held a 4.66 ERA and 56 strikeouts in 65 2/3 innings.

In 2012, Loup joined the New Hampshire Fisher Cats, the double-A affiliate of the Toronto Blue Jays. There, he boasted 36 Eastern League appearances, a 2.84 ERA, and 43 strikeouts in 44 1/3 innings. After his teammate Sam Dyson was promoted to the Blue Jays, Loup was Dyson's replacement for the Minor League Baseball 2012 Eastern League All-Star Game.

=== Toronto Blue Jays ===
==== 2012–2014 ====
Loup began 2012 with the Fisher Cats. In the 2012 season, the Toronto Blue Jays used 32 different pitchers due to frequent injuries, and Loup was among these. He was called up to replace Luis Pérez on July 14 after Pérez tore his ulnar collateral ligament. In his debut, Loup retired all six batters he faced.

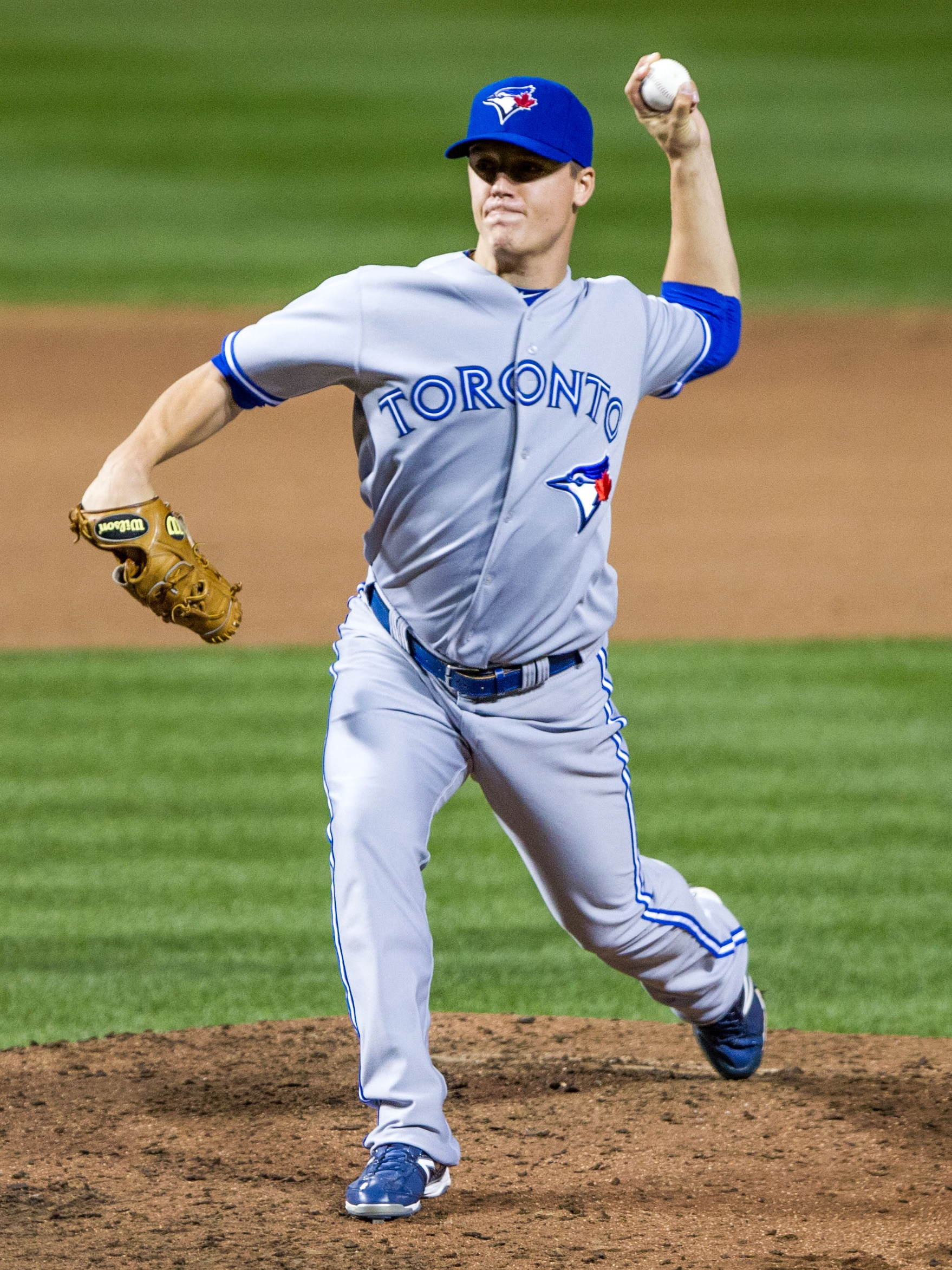
Loup pitching for the Blue Jays in 2012

On August 3, Loup became the first pitcher in Blue Jays history to bat in an American League game, grounding out to begin the top of the 15th against the Oakland Athletics. Loup closed out the season posting a 0–2 record with a 2.64 ERA and 21 strikeouts in 30 2/3 innings. The Toronto chapter of the Baseball Writers' Association of America (BBWAA) named him the Toronto Blue Jays 2012 Rookie of the Year that November.

Though he was considered one of the front-runners, there was still much competition for one of the limited 2013 bullpen spots as a relief pitcher. His main competition was seen as Brett Cecil and J. A. Happ. John Gibbons said, "How it best fits the team, how it all stacks up down there is really what it's going to come down to. But we're going to go with the best guy, not because guys are out of options." Reportedly, Loup learned that he had acquired one of the bullpen spots when Gibbons walked by his locker and said, "Oh, hey Loup—you made the team."

Loup pitched 1 1/3 innings of relief for the Blue Jays against the Cleveland Indians on Opening Day. On April 10, in a game against the Detroit Tigers, Loup recorded his first career win. On April 12, Loup recorded his first major league save in a game against the Kansas City Royals. He recorded a second major league save in a game against the San Diego Padres on June 2. On April 20, Loup committed a two-run throwing error in the 11th inning against the New York Yankees. During the first two months of the Blue Jays' lackluster 2013 season, Loup and other relief pitchers helped to keep the Blue Jays from more defeats. Loup was the ninth and final pitcher in an 18-inning game against the Texas Rangers on June 8. The game, the longest in Blue Jays history, resulted in a win after he gained a pair of groundouts. In another game against the Rangers on June 14, Loup pitched in the eighth inning and participated in a shutout. He ended the 2013 season with a 4–6 record, 2.47 ERA and 53 strikeouts in 69 1/3 innings.

Loup was one of eight pitchers in the bullpen for the Blue Jays' 2014 opening day. On April 20, he walked three consecutive batters for the first time in his career, and took the loss as the Blue Jays fell to the Cleveland Indians 6–4. On May 3, the Blue Jays announced that Loup would replace Sergio Santos as the team's closer until Casey Janssen returned from injury. After walking as many batters in three months as he had the entire last season, he regained confidence after pitching the last few innings of a game on June 4 that went from a 3–2 lead to an 8–2 win against the Detroit Tigers.

==== 2015–2018 ====
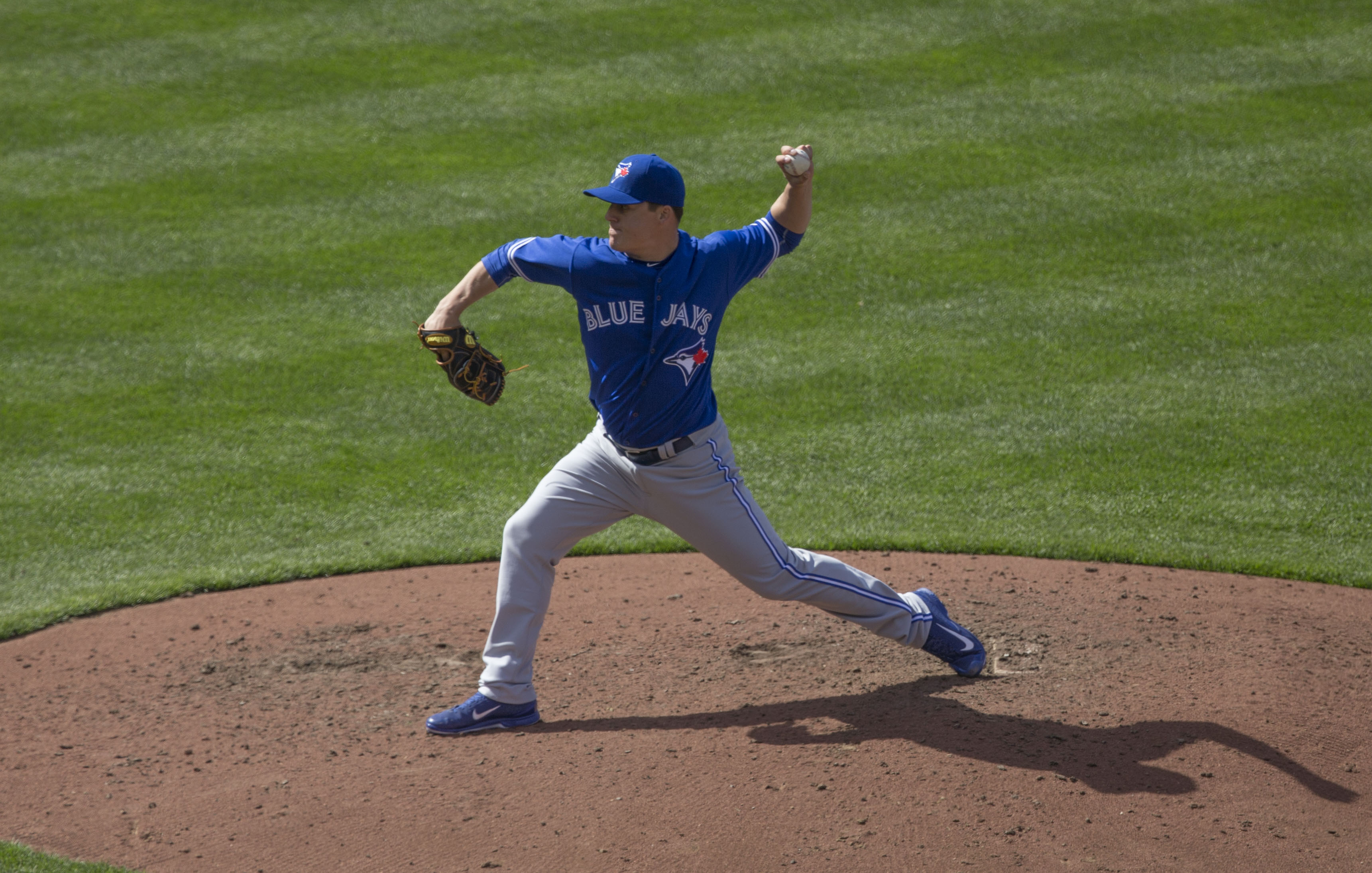
Loup during the 2015 season

Loup took the loss in the Blue Jays' second game of the 2015 season. Entering with a 3–1 lead against the New York Yankees in the eighth inning, he loaded the bases without recording an out. All three runners would come in to score and Toronto would lose, 4–3. Loup experienced ineffectiveness throughout the season, posting an ERA over 5.00 into August. After a 3–1 win over the Yankees on August 16, he was optioned to the Triple-A Buffalo Bisons. He was recalled on September 1. For the season, he was 2-5 and had a 4.46 ERA.

On January 15, 2016, Loup and the Blue Jays avoided salary arbitration by agreeing to a one-year, $1.05 million contract. Loup began the 2016 season on the disabled list with a left forearm flexor strain. He began a rehab assignment with the Dunedin Blue Jays on May 14. On May 21, he was moved up to the Buffalo Bisons to continue rehabbing the injury. Loup was recalled on August 21. On August 27, he was placed on optional waivers. He accepted a minor league assignment the following day. For the season, he had a 5.02 ERA.

On January 13, 2017, Loup agreed to a one-year, $1.125 million contract for the 2017 season. He finished the season with a 2–3 record and a 3.75 ERA in 70 games, while giving up a career-high 4.5 walks per nine innings.

On January 12, 2018, Loup signed a one-year, $1.8125 million contract. For the 2018 season, he logged 35 2/3 innings for the Blue Jays in 50 appearances, with a 4.54 ERA, while giving up a career-high 11.1 hits per nine innings, before being traded to Philadelphia.

=== Philadelphia Phillies ===
On July 31, 2018, Loup was traded to the Philadelphia Phillies in exchange for Jacob Waguespack.

=== San Diego Padres ===
On February 17, 2019, Loup signed a one-year contract with the San Diego Padres. He spent the majority of the season on the injured list following an elbow injury, and appeared in only four early-season games.

=== Tampa Bay Rays ===
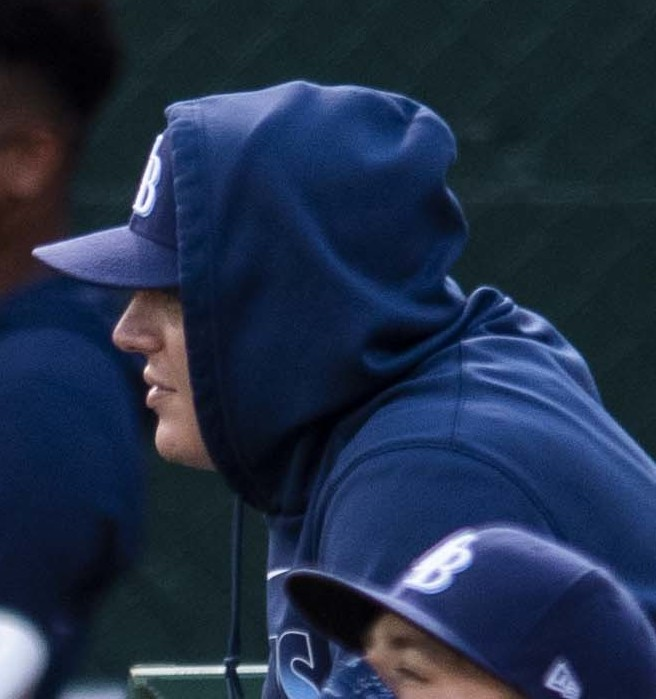
Loup with the Rays in 2020

On February 11, 2020, Loup signed a minor league deal with the Tampa Bay Rays. On July 16, the Rays added him to the 40-man roster after Austin Meadows tested positive for COVID-19. On August 16, Loup achieved a rare feat of being credited with two wins in one day, against the Toronto Blue Jays, his former team. This happened because the first game (which began on August 15) was suspended due to rain and completed a day later, and was followed by the game scheduled for August 16.

In 24 games with the Rays in 2020, Loup posted a 3–2 record with a 2.52 ERA with 22 strikeouts and an 0.840 WHIP across 25 innings. He made his second appearance in the postseason after 2015 as the Rays won the AL East. He pitched a scoreless inning in the deciding game of the American League Wild Card Series against the Blue Jays, and made four scoreless appearances in the American League Champion Series against the Houston Astros, helping the Rays advance to the 2020 World Series.

=== New York Mets ===
On January 30, 2021, Loup signed a one-year, $3 million contract with the New York Mets. On Opening Day against the Philadelphia Phillies, he forced in a run by hitting Bryce Harper with a pitch while the bases were loaded. Loup was brought in specifically to pitch against his fellow left-hander Harper. As the 2021 season progressed, Loup became one of the most reliable members of the Mets' bullpen, finishing the season with an ERA of 0.95 in 56 2/3 innings pitched.

=== Los Angeles Angels ===
On November 22, 2021, Loup signed a two-year, $17 million contract with the Los Angeles Angels. He made his debut with the team on April 7, 2022, in a game against the Houston Astros, pitching one inning and striking out one in relief of Shohei Ohtani. On November 3, 2023, the Angels declined the $7.5 million team option on his contract, making him a free agent.

== Scouting report ==
=== Defense ===
Due to his non-ideal size as a pitcher, some have seen issues in Loup's stamina and durability. His pitches can also come across as "a bit too hittable." But he is especially effective against left-handed batters. In 2013, Loup was viewed by the Blue Jays' manager John Gibbons as "not necessarily a long guy; he's more a situational, one-inning guy." Despite his shortcomings, Loup has the lowest walk rate among all major league pitchers who have pitched at least seventy innings since 2012, having walked only 2.6% of the batters he has faced. His consistency and endurance have made Loup the Blue Jays' most-used reliever, and he says "I'm one of those guys that if my body would let me, I would pitch every day."

=== Pitching style ===
Loup is a left-handed pitcher. He struggled at first with pitching until minor league pitching instructor Dane Johnson and Dunedin pitching coach Darold Knowles told him to lower his arm and become more of a sidearm pitcher. Now, as he pitches, he tracks a plane from his ear to his shoulder, which also helped his effectiveness against left-handed batters. His slider and fastball improved drastically, but his changeup continued to struggle, and Loup says he is still a little inconsistent with it. He can throw a low-90s "breaking" fastball that is just as effective against right-handed batters as left-handed ones. John Farrell, a previous Blue Jays manager, said that it was "[Loup's] poise and his presence that allows him to maintain not only composure, but the ability to execute." Blue Jays bullpen coach Pat Hentgen says that Loup "keeps things simple, he doesn't overthink. He stays aggressive. He's got a lot of guts, goes right after hitters and you combine all those things and you're going to have the success that he's had." One reporter compared Loup to Bran Flakes, saying, "[y]ou know exactly what you're going to get from him every time he takes the mound and he's not going to add any excitement to any situation."

== Personal life ==
Loup married his high school sweetheart Leigh Ann. They have one child, a daughter named Sophie Harper Loup, born the weekend of August 24, 2013. Loup went on the paternity list for the Blue Jays on August 23, 2013, but was called back on August 26 due to the three-day paternity list limit. Loup and his wife spend the off-season at their Louisiana home. An avid bowhunter, Loup prefers hunting deer with a compound bow. He has also been known to fish and hunt with a gun in the off-season. He is known for having a quiet and reserved personality, but says that he has become "a little more comfortable" with his teammates by spending time and "connecting" with them, which he says contributes to his success.
