= Jha'Quan Jackson =

American football player (born 2000)

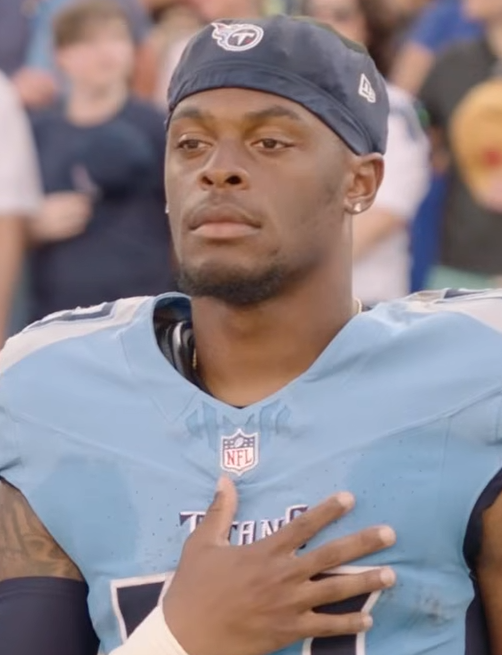
- Jackson playing for the Tennessee Titans in 2024

Profile
- Position: Wide receiver / Return specialist

Personal information
- Born: May 15, 2000 (age 26); Metairie, Louisiana, U.S.
- Listed height: 5 ft 9 in (1.75 m)
- Listed weight: 188 lb (85 kg)

Career information
- High school: Hahnville (Boutte, Louisiana)
- College: Tulane (2019–2023)
- NFL draft: 2024: 6th round, 182nd overall pick

Career history
- Tennessee Titans (2024); New Orleans Saints (2025)*; St. Louis Battlehawks (2026)*; Houston Texans (2026)*; Tampa Bay Buccaneers (2026)*
- * Offseason or practice squad member only

Awards and highlights
- Third-team All-AAC (2023)

Career NFL statistics as of 2025
- Receptions: 1
- Receiving yards: 8
- Return yards: 627
- Stats at Pro Football Reference

Jha'Quan Brian Jackson (born May 15, 2000) is an American professional football wide receiver and return specialist. He played college football for the Tulane Green Wave and was selected by the Titans in the sixth round of the 2024 NFL draft.

== Early life ==
Jackson attended Hahnville High School in Boutte, Louisiana. He played wide receiver and quarterback in high school. He committed to Tulane University to play college football. Jackson's uncle is Pro Football Hall of Fame safety Ed Reed.

== College career ==
Jackson played at Tulane from 2019 to 2023. After recording two receptions his first year at Tulane in 2019, he led the team with 31 receptions for 425 yards and eight touchdowns in 2020. He had 17 receptions for 294 yards and one touchdown in 2021 and 33 receptions for 554 yards and three touchdowns in 2022. As a senior in 2023, Jackson had 26 receptions for 439 yards and four touchdowns over 10 games.

=== College Stats ===
In totality, Jackson played in 56 games and had 109 receptions for 1,743 yards and 17 touchdowns. He averaged 16.0 yards/reception and 31.1 yards per game.

He had 12 rushing attempts for 116 yards and 1 touchdown.

== Professional career ==
Pre-draft measurables
Height	Weight	Arm length	Hand span	Wingspan	40-yard dash	10-yard split	20-yard split	Vertical jump	Broad jump	Bench press
5 ft 9 1/8 in (1.76 m)	188 lb (85 kg)	30 7/8 in (0.78 m)	8 7/8 in (0.23 m)	6 ft 2 7/8 in (1.90 m)	4.42 s	1.55 s	2.58 s	32.0 in (0.81 m)	9 ft 10 in (3.00 m)	12 reps
All values from NFL Combine

=== Tennessee Titans ===
Jackson was selected by the Tennessee Titans in the sixth round with the 182nd overall pick in the 2024 NFL draft. The Titans acquired the pick in a previous trade with the Philadelphia Eagles.

Jackson made his NFL debut on September 8 against the Chicago Bears as the team's primary kick returner. He appeared in the first 12 games of the 2024 season, making 16 kick returns for 412 yards and 28 punt returns for 215 yards, along with one reception for 8 yards as a receiver.

Jackson was waived by the Titans on August 25, 2025.

=== New Orleans Saints ===
On November 19, 2025, Jackson signed with the New Orleans Saints' practice squad. He was waived by the Saints on November 25.

=== St. Louis Battlehawks ===
On January 14, 2026, Jackson was selected by the St. Louis Battlehawks of the United Football League (UFL). He was released by the Battlehawks on March 19.

=== Houston Texans ===
On May 26, 2026, Jackson signed with the Houston Texans. He was waived by the Texans on August 24.

=== Tampa Bay Buccaneers ===
On August 26, 2026, Jackson signed with the Tampa Bay Buccaneers. Jackson was waived by the Buccaneers as a part of final roster cuts on August 30.
