= Pooka Williams Jr. =

American football player (born 1999)

No. 7 – Orlando Pirates
- Position: Running back
- Roster status: Active

Personal information
- Born: June 19, 1999 (age 27); New Orleans, Louisiana, U.S.
- Listed height: 5 ft 10 in (1.78 m)
- Listed weight: 170 lb (77 kg)

Career information
- High school: Hahnville (Boutte, Louisiana)
- College: Kansas (2018–2020)
- NFL draft: 2021: undrafted

Career history
- Cincinnati Bengals (2021); DC Defenders (2023); St. Louis BattleHawks (2023); DC Defenders (2023–2024); San Antonio Brahmas (2024); Massachusetts / Orlando Pirates (2025–present)

Awards and highlights
- First-team All-IFL (2026); Second-team All-IFL (2025); 2× First-team All-Big 12 (2018–2019); Big 12 Offensive Freshman of the Year (2018)

Career NFL statistics
- Return yards: 52
- Stats at Pro Football Reference

Anthony "Pooka" Williams Jr. (born June 19, 1999) is an American professional football running back for the Orlando Pirates of the Indoor Football League (IFL). He played college football for the Kansas Jayhawks. He was named First Team All-Big 12 running back as a freshman and as a sophomore. He signed with the Bengals as an undrafted free agent in 2021.

== Early life ==
Williams got the nickname "Pooka" from his grandmother as a child. He attended high school at Hahnville High School in Boutte, Louisiana. As a senior he ran for 3,118 yards and 37 touchdowns. Hahnville lost in the Louisiana 5A State Championship his senior year. For his performance his senior year, he was named Louisiana Mr. Football. Williams was a four-star recruit out of high school, according to ESPN.com. He received offers from LSU, Memphis, Kansas, Mississippi State, and TCU. On February 12, 2017, he committed to Kansas.

College recruiting
Name	Hometown	School	Height	Weight	Commit date
Pooka Williams Jr. RB	New Orleans, LA	Hahnville	5 ft 10 in (1.78 m)	170 lb (77 kg)	Feb 7, 2017
Pooka Williams Jr. RB	Recruit ratings: Rivals: 247Sports: ESPN: (80)				

== College career ==
=== Freshman season ===
Williams was heavily recruited by then Kansas head coach David Beaty, and signed with Kansas in 2018. Williams played his first game at Kansas in their second game of the season against Central Michigan. He ran for 125 yards and 2 touchdowns as he helped lead Kansas to their first road victory since 2009. The following week, he rushed 161 yards and 1 touchdown. He would go on to rush for over 100 yards two more times during the season, including recording 252 rushing yards against Oklahoma. Williams finished the season with 1,125 yards and 7 touchdowns. For his performance as a freshman, Williams was named 1st Team All-Big 12 and Offensive Freshman of the Year.

=== Sophomore season ===
Following an offseason arrest, Williams was suspended for the majority off the off-season before being reinstated in July. He did also serve a 1-game suspension for the Jayhawks season opener against Indiana State. Prior to the season, Williams was named Preseason 1st team All-Big 12. He made his season debut against Coastal Carolina rushing for 99 yards and zero touchdowns in the Jayhawks 7–12 loss. The following week against Boston College, he rushed for 121 yards and one touchdown helping the Jayhawks to their first Power Five conference road win in 48 games. He would rush for over 100 yards three more times during the season, including a season high 190 yards in a 48–50 loss to Texas. Williams finished the season with 1,042 becoming only the second Jayhawk, along with James Sims, to rush for 1,000 yards in back-to-back seasons. He also broke College Football Hall of Famer Gale Sayers record for most rushing yards in a player's first two seasons. He was named 1st team All-Big 12 for the second consecutive season.

=== Junior season ===
On July 16, 2020, Williams was named pre-season 1st team All-Big 12 for the second consecutive season. He was also named to the Maxwell Award preseason watch list, which awards the nation's overall best player. In the Jayhawks first game of the season, he rushed for 67 yards and no touchdowns in the 23–38 loss. The following week against Baylor, he rushed for two touchdowns in the 14–47 loss. On October 18, he was named Big 12 Special Teams Player of the Week after returning a kickoff 92 yards for a touchdown in a loss to West Virginia. The following day he announced he would be opting out of the remainder of the season to be closer to his mother and family in Louisiana. He released a statement on Twitter saying: "Family and health are the most important things to me. Right now I need to be with my mother, who is battling health issues. I want to thank Coach Miles and everyone with the Kansas Football program for their commitment and understanding." He declared for the 2021 NFL draft on December 6, 2020. He finished his college career with 2,363 rushing yards, good for 9th all-time in Kansas history, 5.7 yards per carry average, and 12 rushing touchdowns.

== Professional career ==
=== NFL ===
Pre-draft measurables
Height	Weight	40-yard dash	20-yard shuttle	Three-cone drill	Vertical jump	Broad jump
5 ft 9 1/2 in (1.77 m)	175 lb (79 kg)	4.36 s	4.01 s	6.87 s	33 in (0.84 m)	9 ft 9 in (2.97 m)
All values from Kansas pro day, as the NFL did not hold a combine due to the COVID-19 pandemic

Williams entered the draft as the 20th ranked running back, according to Sports Illustrated. He was projected as a seventh round pick.

After going undrafted, Williams signed with the Cincinnati Bengals as an undrafted free agent on May 14, 2021, where he was reunited with his teammate from Kansas, Hakeem Adeniji. Williams moved to wide receiver for the Bengals. He was released on August 31, 2021. The following day, he was signed to the Bengals' practice squad. He was elevated to the active roster via a standard elevation on December 4, 2021. He made his NFL debut against the Los Angeles Chargers playing primarily as the team's kick returner for the game.

On February 15, 2022, Williams signed a reserve/future contract with the Bengals. He was waived on August 14, 2022.

=== XFL/UFL ===
Williams was drafted by the DC Defenders in the seventh round of the 2023 XFL draft. He was waived by the Defenders and claimed off waivers by the St. Louis BattleHawks on March 8, 2023. He was released by the BattleHawks on March 21. The Defenders re-signed Williams on April 4, 2023. He was not a part of the roster after the UFL Dispersal Draft. On January 15, 2024, Williams was selected by the DC Defenders. He was released on April 22, 2024. On May 8, 2024, Williams signed with the San Antonio Brahmas of the United Football League (UFL). He was waived on August 23, 2024.

=== IFL ===
On January 16, 2025, Williams signed with the Massachusetts Pirates of the Indoor Football League (IFL). He resigned with the Pirates on January 2, 2026.

== Career statistics ==
=== NFL ===
Year	Team	Games		Kick returns			
Year	Team	GP	GS	Ret	Yds	Avg	TD
2021	CIN	1	0	3	52	17.3	0
Career		1	0	3	52	17.3	0

=== XFL/UFL ===
Year	Team	League	Games		Rushing				Receiving			
Year	Team	League	GP	GS	Att	Yds	Avg	TD	Rec	Yds	Avg	TD
2023	DC	XFL	3	0	1	–1	–1.0	0	0	0	0.0	0
2024	DC	UFL	1	0	1	9	9.0	0	2	0	0.0	0
2024	SA	UFL	3	1	4	9	2.3	0	4	12	3.0	0
Career			7	1	6	17	2.9	0	6	12	2.0	0

=== IFL ===
Year	Team	Games	Rushing				Receiving				Kick returns			
Year	Team	GP	Att	Yds	Avg	TD	Rec	Yds	Avg	TD	Ret	Yds	Avg	TD
2025	MASS	13	202	801	4.0	11	51	361	7.1	2	9	118	13.1	0
Career		13	202	801	4.0	11	51	361	7.1	2	9	118	13.1	0

=== College ===
Year	Team	Games		Rushing				Receiving			
Year	Team	GP	GS	Att	Yds	Avg	TD	Rec	Yds	Avg	TD
2018	Kansas	11	10	161	1,125	7.0	7	33	289	8.8	2
2019	Kansas	11	10	203	1,061	5.2	3	27	214	7.9	2
2020	Kansas	4	4	51	196	3.8	2	6	31	5.2	0
Career		26	24	415	2,382	5.7	12	66	534	8.1	4

== Personal life ==
On July 19, 2021, Williams announced on his Twitter that he was expecting his first child, a girl.
