= Claudell Harris Jr. =

American basketball player (born 2002)

No. 3 – Hapoel Holon
- Position: Shooting guard
- League: Israeli Basketball Premier League

Personal information
- Born: October 1, 2002 (age 24) Hahnville, Louisiana, U.S.
- Listed height: 6 ft 4 in (1.93 m)
- Listed weight: 200 lb (91 kg)

Career information
- High school: Hahnville (Hahnville, Louisiana)
- College: Charleston Southern (2021–2023); Boston College (2023–2024); Mississippi State (2024–2025)
- NBA draft: 2025: undrafted
- Playing career: 2025–present

Career history
- 2025: Vilpas Vikings
- 2025–2026: Promitheas Patras
- 2026–present: Hapoel Holon

Career highlights
- Second-team All-Big South (2023); Big South All-Freshman Team (2022)

Claudell Morol Harris Jr. (born October 1, 2002) is an American professional basketball player for Hapoel Holon of the Israeli Basketball Premier League. He played college basketball for the Charleston Southern Buccaneers, Boston College Eagles, and Mississippi State Bulldogs.

== Early life and high school ==
Harris attended Hahnville High School. As a senior, he was a 2021 first-team All-State selection by the Louisiana Sports Writers Association. He averaged nearly 21 points per game during his final season, and earned a 7-5A District MVP honors. He holds the Hahnville High School record, scoring 22 points in a single quarter.

During high school, Harris joined an AAU team based in Atlanta, Georgia, that was run by one of his dad's friends. While competing in a tournament, he was noticed by former Charleston Southern head coach Barclay Radebaugh.

== College career ==
On December 13, 2020, Harris signed his letter of intent with Charleston Southern University during the early signing period.

In 2021-22, in his freshman year in 31 games he averaged 10.3 points, 4.2 rebounds, 2.0 assists, and 28.0 minutes per game, On March 1, 2022, Harris was named to the 2021-2022 All-Big South All-Freshman Team.

In 2022-23 in 30 games he averaged 17.4 points, 3.9 rebounds, 2.3 assists, and 31.3 minutes per game, On January 16, 2023, he was named Big South Player of the Week after having two 30-point games. On February 28, 2023, Harris was named to the 2022-2023 All-Big South Team as a Second Team selection.

In April 2023, Harris committed to Boston College. He was the first acquisition for head coach Earl Grant for the 2023 offseason. He took a visit to BC's campus over Easter weekend. For the season, in 35 games he averaged 13.7 points, 3.7 rebounds, 2.1 assists, and 31.5 minutes per game, In April 2024, Harris entered the transfer portal after being second in scoring for the team.

On April 20, 2024, Harris committed to Mississippi State University. He averaged 9.6 points, 2.8 rebounds, 1.2 assists, and 0.9 steals per game.

== Professional career ==
On June 4, 2025, Harris signed with Vilpas Vikings of Korisliiga to begin his professional career. In six games he averaged 20.0 points, 4.7 rebounds, 5.5 assists, and 26.0 minutes per game, while shooting 46.2% from three-point range,

He signed with Promitheas Patras of the Greek Basket League on November 5, and played 23 games for the team, averaging 10.1 points, 2.6 rebounds and 1.8 assists per game.

In 2026-27 he is playing for Hapoel Holon of the Israeli Basketball Premier League, with whom he signed on July 16, 2026.

== Personal life ==
His father, Claudell Harris Sr, played basketball at Southeastern Louisiana University in the early 1990's.

When Harris was six, his mother, Cheree Harris, was diagnosed with breast cancer. Ten years later, she was re-diagnosed with breast cancer for a second time. When Harris was a senior in high school, his father was diagnosed with renal cell carcinoma.
