= Alfred Blue =

American football player (born 1991)

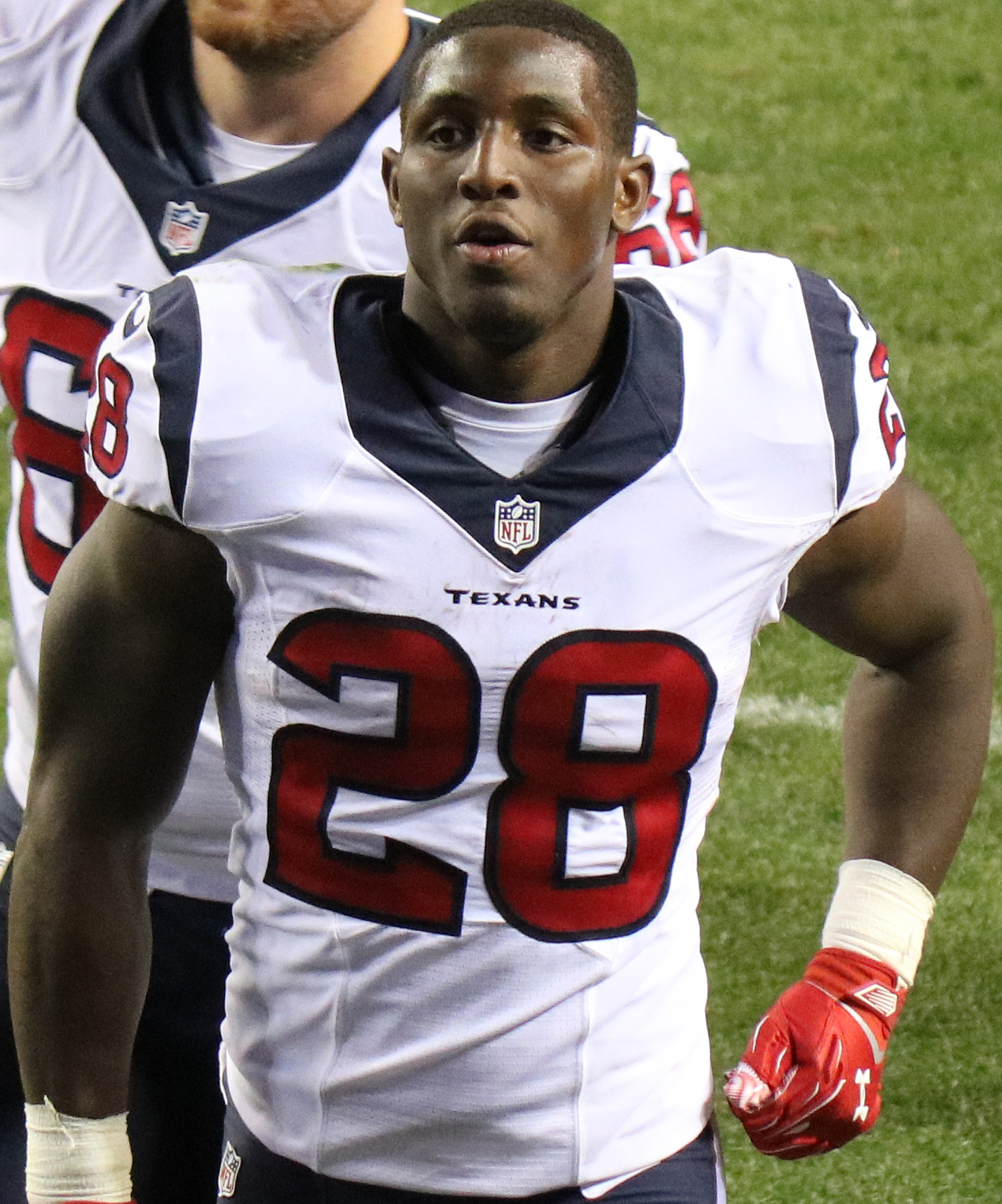
- Blue with the Houston Texans in 2016

No. 23, 28
- Position: Running back

Personal information
- Born: April 27, 1991 (age 35); Marrero, Louisiana, U.S.
- Listed height: 6 ft 2 in (1.88 m)
- Listed weight: 225 lb (102 kg)

Career information
- High school: Hahnville (Boutte, Louisiana)
- College: LSU (2010–2013)
- NFL draft: 2014: 6th round, 181st overall pick

Career history
- Houston Texans (2014–2018); Jacksonville Jaguars (2019)

Career NFL statistics
- Rushing yards: 2,407
- Rushing average: 3.6
- Rushing touchdowns: 8
- Receptions: 69
- Receiving yards: 470
- Receiving touchdowns: 2
- Stats at Pro Football Reference

Alfred Calvin Blue III (born April 27, 1991) is an American former professional football player who was a running back in the National Football League (NFL). He was selected by the Houston Texans in the sixth round of the 2014 NFL draft. Blue is from Boutte, Louisiana and attended Hahnville High School. He played college football for the LSU Tigers.

Blue remained with the Texans for five seasons, primarily as a reserve player. He received his greatest amount of playing time in 2015, when he started 9 out of 16 games. In 2019, he signed with the Jacksonville Jaguars, but was released without playing a single game.

== Early life ==
Blue attended and played high school football at Hahnville High School. He rushed for 1,695 yards and 25 touchdowns along with 13 receptions for nearly 200 yards and three touchdowns in his senior season in 2009. Blue was a member of the SuperPrep Southwest Team and was named to the Baton Rouge Advocate Super Dozen. Blue earned the honors of the Class 5A all-state first-team in 2009 and was selected as the District 6-5A 2009 Offensive MVP. Blue was also on the school's track team, where he ran the 200-meter dash in 23.5 and the 4 × 200 m relay in 1:28.70. Blue was ranked as a three-star prospect by Rivals and Scout.com. Blue committed to LSU to play college football under Les Miles.

== College career ==
Blue attended and played college football at LSU from 2010 to 2013.

As a freshman, Blue shared the backfield with Stevan Ridley, Michael Ford, Russell Shepard, Richard Murphy, and Spencer Ware. On September 11, against Vanderbilt, he had five rushes for 23 yards and a touchdown in his collegiate debut. Overall, he finished his freshman season with 101 rushing yards and one rushing touchdown.

As a sophomore, Blue's role in the backfield expanded. He finished third on the team in carries, only trailing Spencer Ware and Michael Ford. From September 24 to October 8, he scored a rushing touchdown in three straight games. On November 12, against Western Kentucky, he had 119 rushing yards and two rushing touchdowns. In the SEC Championship against Georgia, he had 94 rushing yards and a rushing touchdown in the victory. Overall, he finished the 2011 season with 539 rushing yards and seven rushing touchdowns.

As a junior, Blue finished fifth on the team in rushing yards and sixth in carries. Due to an ACL injury, he only appeared in three games. He finished the season with 270 rushing yards and two rushing touchdowns to go along with seven receptions for 45 yards.

As a senior, Blue finished third on the team in rushing yards and carries. Overall, he finished the season with 343 rushing yards and a rushing touchdown to go along with five receptions for 62 yards.

=== College statistics ===
Year	School	Class	Pos	G	Rushing				Receiving			
Year	School	Class	Pos	G	Rush	Yds	Avg	TD	Rec	Yds	Avg	TD
2010	LSU	Freshman	RB	11	20	101	5.1	1	1	1	1.0	0
2011	LSU	Sophomore	RB	13	78	539	6.9	7	3	−3	−1.0	0
2012	LSU	Junior	RB	4	40	270	6.8	2	7	45	6.4	0
2013	LSU	Senior	RB	13	71	343	4.8	1	5	62	12.4	0
Career				41	209	1253	6.0	11	16	105	6.6	0

== Professional career ==
Pre-draft measurables
Height	Weight	Arm length	Hand span	Wingspan	40-yard dash	10-yard split	20-yard split	20-yard shuttle	Three-cone drill	Vertical jump	Broad jump	Bench press
6 ft 2 3/8 in (1.89 m)	223 lb (101 kg)	32 3/8 in (0.82 m)	9 7/8 in (0.25 m)	6 ft 4 3/8 in (1.94 m)	4.63 s	1.59 s	2.67 s	4.50 s	7.15 s	32.0 in (0.81 m)	10 ft 1 in (3.07 m)	13 reps
All values from NFL Combine

=== Houston Texans ===
Blue was selected by the Houston Texans in the sixth round with the 181st overall pick in the 2014 NFL draft. In his first regular season game as a rookie with the Texans, Blue blocked a punt against Washington Redskins punter Tress Way and returned it for a touchdown. On September 21, 2014, Blue had his first career start against the New York Giants. On October 5, 2014, Blue had his first career fumble recovery against the Dallas Cowboys. On October 20, 2014, Blue caught his first career touchdown reception against the Pittsburgh Steelers. On October 26, 2014, Blue caught a season-high 22-yard pass against the Tennessee Titans. On November 16, 2014, Blue ran for 156 yards on a franchise-record 36 attempts against the Cleveland Browns. On December 7, 2014, Blue scored his first career rushing touchdown, against the Jacksonville Jaguars. At that moment, Blue became the first player in franchise history with a rushing, receiving, and return touchdown in the same season. On December 28, 2014, Blue set career highs in receptions (6) and receiving yards (37) against the Jaguars. Blue finished the 2014 season with 528 yards, which was the fourth-highest total for a rookie rusher in franchise history.

In the 2015 season, Blue remained a contributor in the Texans' backfield. In Week 3, against the Tampa Bay Buccaneers, he had 139 rushing yards and a rushing touchdown. On December 20, against the Indianapolis Colts, he had 107 rushing yards in the 16–10 victory. In the regular season finale against the Jaguars, he had 102 rushing yards in the 30–6 victory. Overall, he finished the 2015 season with 698 rushing yards, two rushing touchdowns, 15 receptions, 109 receiving yards, and a receiving touchdown. The Texans won the AFC South and made the playoffs. In the Wild Card Round against the Kansas City Chiefs, he had 17 carries for 99 yards in the 30–0 loss.

In the 2016 season, Blue's role in the backfield dipped, but he still produced for the team. On Christmas Eve, he had 73 rushing yards and his lone rushing touchdown of the season against the Cincinnati Bengals. Overall, he had 100 carries for 420 yards and a rushing touchdown in the 2016 season. For the second straight season, the Texans won the AFC South. In the Wild Card Round against the Oakland Raiders, he was limited to four rushing yards in the 27–14 victory. in the Divisional Round against the New England Patriots, he had two rushing yards in the 34–16 loss.

In the 2017 season, Blue's production dropped for the second straight season. On Christmas Day, he had 108 rushing yards in the 34–6 loss to the Steelers. Overall, he finished the 2017 season with 262 rushing yards, one rushing touchdown, seven receptions, and 54 receiving yards.

On April 30, 2018, Blue re-signed with the Texans on a one-year contract. Overall, in the 2018 season, he had 499 rushing yards and two rushing touchdowns. The Texans returned to the playoffs and faced off against the Colts in the Wild Card Round. In the 21–7 loss, he had 19 scrimmage yards.

=== Jacksonville Jaguars ===
On April 1, 2019, Blue signed with the Jaguars. On September 1, he was placed on injured reserve. He was released on October 28.

=== NFL statistics ===
Regular season statistics
Season		Games		Rushing					Receiving					Games	
Year	Team	GP	GS	Att	Yds	Avg	Lng	TD	Rec	Yds	Avg	Lng	TD	Fum	Lost
2014	HOU	16	3	169	528	3.1	46	2	15	113	7.5	22	1	0	0
2015	HOU	16	9	183	698	3.8	41	2	15	109	7.3	21	1	2	1
2016	HOU	14	2	100	420	4.2	25	1	12	40	3.3	12	0	2	1
2017	HOU	11	0	71	262	3.7	48	1	7	54	7.7	14	0	0	0
2018	HOU	16	2	150	499	3.3	17	2	20	154	7.7	28	0	0	0
Total		62	16	673	2,407	3.6	48	8	69	470	6.8	28	2	4	2

Postseason statistics
Season		Games		Rushing					Receiving					Fumbles	
Year	Team	GP	GS	Att	Yds	Avg	Lng	TD	Rec	Yds	Avg	Lng	TD	Fum	Lost
2015	HOU	1	1	17	99	5.8	49	0	0	0	0.0	0	0	0	0
2016	HOU	2	0	3	6	2.0	4	0	0	0	0.0	0	0	0	0
2018	HOU	1	0	2	8	4.0	4	0	2	11	5.5	6	0	0	0
Total		4	1	22	113	5.1	49	0	2	11	5.5	6	0	0	0
