= Hahnville High School =

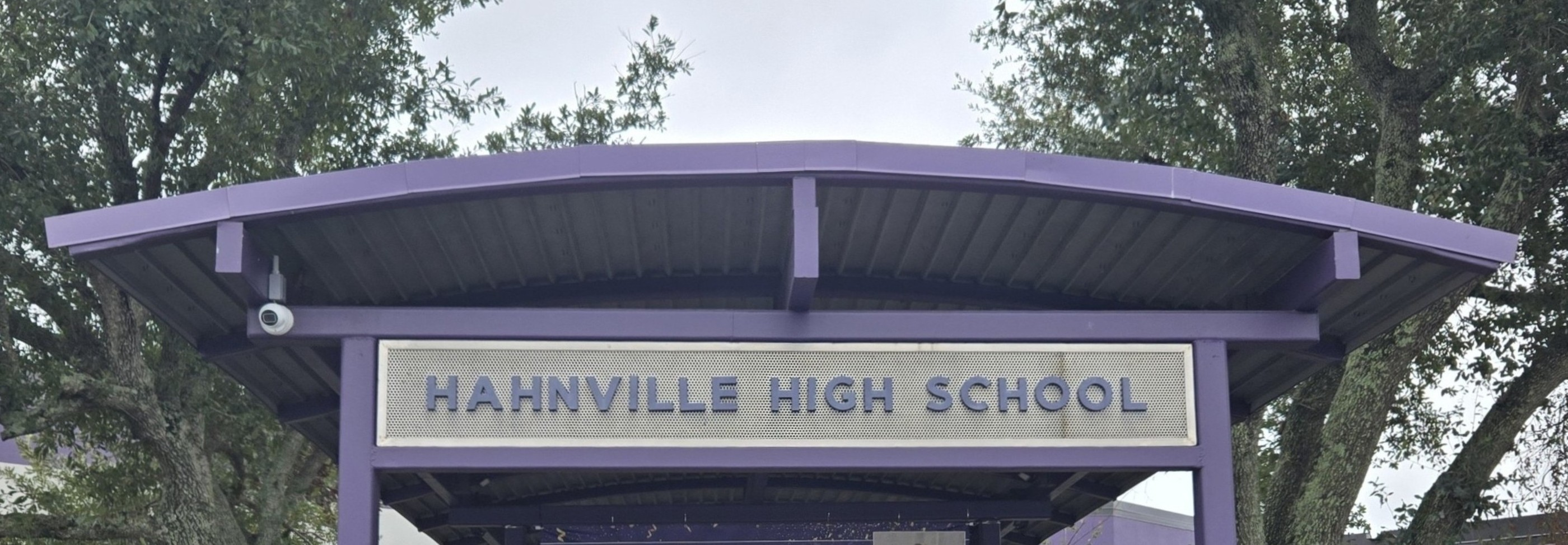

Location
- 200 Tiger Drive; Boutte, Louisiana 70039; United States; 29.889929°N 90.405637°W

Information
- School type: Public
- Established: 1924
- School district: St. Charles Parish Public School System
- CEEB code: 191135
- Principal: Jose Gonzales
- Teaching staff: 122.27 (FTE)
- Grades: 9–12
- Gender: Co-ed
- Enrollment: 1,416 (as of 2024–2025)
- Student to teacher ratio: 11.58
- Campus type: Urban Fringe
- Colors: Purple and Vegas gold
- Athletics: Louisiana High School Athletic Association
- Athletics conference: District 8-5A
- Mascot: Bengal tiger
- Nickname: Fighting Tigers
- Rivals: Destrehan Fighting Wildcats
- Yearbook: Roar
- Website: hahnville.wearescpps.org

Hahnville High School is a public high school located in Boutte, Louisiana, United States. It is part of the St. Charles Parish Public School System, serving grades 9 through 12. J.B. Martin and R.K. Smith Middle Schools are the feeder schools for Hahnville High School.

Students living on the west bank of the Mississippi River in St. Charles Parish are assigned to the school. Residents of Ama, Bayou Gauche, Boutte, Des Allemands (area of town located in St. Charles Parish), Hahnville, Killona, Luling, and Paradis are assigned to the school.

== History ==
Founded in 1924 in the parish seat of Hahnville, Louisiana, the school moved to its present location at Boutte, Louisiana in 1976. Hahnville High School has maintained its accreditation from the Southern Association of Colleges and Schools every year since 1948.

In 1969, then all-black G. W. Carver High School in Hahnville was closed and its students moved to Hahnville High.

Beginning in 2005, students in grades 11 and 12 from both Hahnville and Destrehan have had the option to attend the school district's Satellite Center for half of the school day. The goal is for students to concentrate on career paths that are projected to expand the most over the next decade. Courses at the Satellite Center include: Advanced Television Broadcasting, Digital Media, Engineering Design, Interactive Media, Process Technology (PTEC), Health Care Exploration, Patient Care, Hotel-Restaurant and Tourism (HRT) Administration, Culinary Arts, and Students Teaching And Reaching (STAR). As of the 2018-2019 school year, the Satellite Center added courses in Instrumentation and Health Clinical. Thus, the courses of Digital Media, Interactive Media, and Advanced Television Broadcasting were moved into the academic wing of the school district's brand-new Rodney Lafon Performing Arts Center less than a block away from the Satellite Center. Despite the move, these three courses are still considered a part of the Satellite Center.

Since moving to its new campus, Hahnville High has grown to nine buildings.

== Extracurricular activities ==
- National Honor Society
- National Beta Club
- Spanish Honor Society
- Student Council
- Air Force JROTC Unit LA-933
- The Fighting Tiger Marching Band
- Color Guard
- Choir
- Cheerleading
- Dance Team (Hi-Steppers)
- Fellowship of Christian Athletes
- FAM (Freshman Advisory Mentor)
- FBLA (Future Business Leaders of America)
- InterAct Club
- Literary Society
- Science Olympiad
- Television Production
- Yearbook
- Team 2183 - Tigerbots
- French Club
- Green Club
- Art Club
- Alpha Mu Omega
- Kappa Psi Gamma
- Sleep in a Box
- Anime Club

== Athletics ==
Hahnville High athletics competes in the LHSAA.

On-campus sports include football, boys and girls basketball, soccer, tennis, cross country, track and field, baseball, softball, volleyball and wrestling.

Off-campus sports include swimming, Bowling, and golf. The swim team has meets at the Mimosa Swim and Racquet Club, and the golf team participates in tournaments at Grand Ridge Golf Club as well as other nearby courses.

=== Football ===
Hahnville has won the Louisiana Prep-Football State Championship six times, most recently in 2003. Hahnville has finished in the USA Today Super 25 three times, 1992, 1994, and 2003. The team plays at Tiger Stadium on campus.

State Championships

- (6) 1949, 1968, 1972, 1992, 1994, 2003

=== Baseball ===
State Championships

- (4) 1948, 1952, 1956, 1957

=== Softball ===
During the 2011 season the softball team won the 5A State Championship and finished ranked 16th in the nation.

State Championships

- (1) 2011

== Notable alumni ==
- Alfred Blue (born 1991), NFL running back
- LaRon Byrd (born 1989), NFL wide receiver
- Channing Canada (born 2002), NFL cornerback
- Pokey Chatman, WNBA head basketball coach
- Claudell Harris Jr. (born 2002), basketball player in the Israeli Basketball Premier League
- Jha'Quan Jackson (born 2000), NFL wide receiver
- Dawan Landry, NFL safety
- LaRon Landry, NFL safety
- Aaron Loup (born 1987), MLB pitcher
- Darius Reynaud, NFL running back and wide receiver
- Garland Robinette, journalist
- Kyle Roussel (born 1988), Grammy nominated musician
- Pooka Williams Jr. (born 1999), NFL wide receiver
