= Paradis, Louisiana =

Paradis
- Census-designated place
- Location of Paradis in Louisiana
- Coordinates: 29°52′40″N 90°26′08″W
- Country: United States
- State: Louisiana
- Parish: St. Charles

Area
  - Total: 6.67 sq mi (17.27 km^{2})
  - Land: 6.43 sq mi (16.65 km^{2})
  - Water: 0.24 sq mi (0.62 km^{2})
- Elevation: 3 ft (0.91 m)

Population (2020)
  - Total: 1,242
  - Density: 193.2/sq mi (74.59/km^{2})
- Time zone: UTC-6 (CST)
  - Summer (DST): UTC-5 (CDT)
- Area code: 985
- FIPS code: 22-58920

Paradis is a census-designated place (CDP) in St. Charles Parish, Louisiana, United States. The population was 1,252 at the 2000 census and 1,242 in 2020.

== Geography ==
Paradis is located at 29°52′40″N 90°26′8″W (29.877743, -90.435598).

According to the United States Census Bureau, the CDP has a total area of 1.3 square miles (3.4 km^{2}), all land.

== Demographics ==
Historical population
Census	Pop.	Note	%±
2000	1,252		—
2010	1,298		3.7%
2020	1,242		−4.3%
U.S. Decennial Census

Paradis was first listed as a census designated place in the 2000 U.S. census.

In 2020, its population was 1,242, down from 1,252 in 2000.

== Education ==
St. Charles Parish Public School System operates public schools:

- R. J. Vial Elementary School (grades 3–5) - Opened in 1975
- J.B. Martin Middle School (grades 6–8)
- Hahnville High School in Boutte
