= LaRon Byrd =

American football player (born 1989)

No. 17
- Position: Wide receiver

Personal information
- Born: August 18, 1989 (age 37); Hahnville, Louisiana, U.S.
- Listed height: 6 ft 4 in (1.93 m)
- Listed weight: 225 lb (102 kg)

Career information
- High school: Hahnville
- College: Miami (FL)
- NFL draft: 2012: undrafted

Career history
- Arizona Cardinals (2012–2013); Dallas Cowboys (2014)*; Cleveland Browns (2014); Dallas Cowboys (2014)*; Miami Dolphins (2014–2015)*; Atlanta Falcons (2015)*; Washington Redskins (2015–2016)*; Carolina Panthers (2016)
- * Offseason or practice squad member only

Career NFL statistics
- Receptions: 1
- Receiving yards: 8
- Stats at Pro Football Reference

LaRon Byrd (born August 18, 1989) is an American former professional football player who was a wide receiver in the National Football League (NFL). He played college football for the Miami Hurricanes. After going undrafted in 2012, Byrd was signed by the Arizona Cardinals. He was also a member of the Dallas Cowboys, Cleveland Browns, Miami Dolphins, Atlanta Falcons, Washington Redskins, and Carolina Panthers.

== Early life ==
Byrd was considered the second-best receiver in Louisiana out of Hahnville High School. As a senior in 2007, caught 50 passes for 630 yards and 13 touchdowns. Byrd also played some safety, making three interceptions, in leading his team to a 10–3 record. As a junior in 2006, made 30 receptions for 447 yards and eight touchdowns. Byrd was ranked the No. 16 player in the state of Louisiana and was ranked the 60th wide receiver prospect in the nation by Rivals.com. Byrd was also ranked as the 69th wide receiver prospect by Scout.com.

College recruiting
Name	Hometown	School	Height	Weight	40^{‡}	Commit date
LaRon Byrd; Wide receiver	Boutte, Louisiana	Hahnville High School	6 ft 4 in (1.93 m)	205 lb (93 kg)	4.46	Feb 1, 2008
LaRon Byrd; Wide receiver	Recruit ratings: Scout: Rivals:					
Overall recruit ranking: Scout: 69 (WR) Rivals: 60 (WR), 16 (LS)
‡ Refers to 40-yard dash; Note: In many cases, Scout, Rivals, 247Sports, On3, and ESPN may conflict in their listings of height, weight and 40 time.; In these cases, the average was taken. ESPN grades are on a 100-point scale.; Sources: "Miami Football Commitments". Rivals.; "2008 Miami Football Recruiting Commits". Scout.; "Scout.com Team Recruiting Rankings". Scout.; "2008 Team Ranking". Rivals.com.

== College career ==
In 2008, Byrd played in all 13 games for the University of Miami and made three starts against Texas A&M, Georgia Tech, and NC State. He was the team's sixth-leading receiver with 21 receptions for 228 yards and three touchdowns. Byrd caught his first career-receiving touchdown on the road at Duke (a 10-yard reception). He had a career-high three receptions in the season opener against Charleston Southern, the regular season finale at NC State and against California in the Emerald Bowl.

== Professional career ==
Pre-draft measurables
Height	Weight	40-yard dash	10-yard split	20-yard split	20-yard shuttle	Three-cone drill	Vertical jump	Broad jump	Bench press
6 ft 3 3/4 in (1.92 m)	220 lb (100 kg)	4.45 s	1.53 s	2.62 s	4.10 s	7.07 s	35.0 in (0.89 m)	10 ft 5 in (3.18 m)	15 reps
All values from Pro Day

=== Arizona Cardinals ===
On April 30, 2012, after going undrafted, Byrd signed with the Arizona Cardinals. On August 6, 2013, Byrd was waived/injured by the Arizona Cardinals. He cleared waivers and was placed on the injured reserve list. On April 4, 2014, Byrd was released by the team.

=== Dallas Cowboys ===
On May 1, 2014, Byrd signed a two-year contract with the Dallas Cowboys. Byrd, who spent all of the 2014 offseason and camp with Dallas, was cut just before the start of the regular season.

=== Cleveland Browns ===
Byrd was claimed off waivers by the Cleveland Browns on August 31, 2014. He played in only one game and was released by the team on October 3, 2014, to make room for Rodney Smith.

=== Dallas Cowboys ===
On October 7, 2014, Byrd was re-signed by the Cowboys to their practice squad. To make room for Byrd, the Cowboys waived wide receiver Tim Benford, who was in his third season on the practice squad. On October 9, 2014, the Cowboys released Byrd from the practice squad to make room for wide receiver Kerry Taylor.

=== Miami Dolphins ===
On April 15, 2015, the Miami Dolphins signed Byrd to compete for the 5th wide receiver position. On August 30, 2015, he was released by the Dolphins.

=== Atlanta Falcons ===
On September 16, 2015, the Atlanta Falcons signed Byrd to their practice squad. He was released on November 3.

=== Washington Redskins ===
The Washington Redskins signed Byrd to their practice squad on November 9, 2015.

He signed a futures contract on January 11, 2016. He was released by the team on May 2.

=== Carolina Panthers ===
On May 20, 2016, Byrd signed with the Carolina Panthers. On August 30, 2016, Byrd was placed on injured reserve.
