= Dawan Landry =

American football player (born 1982)

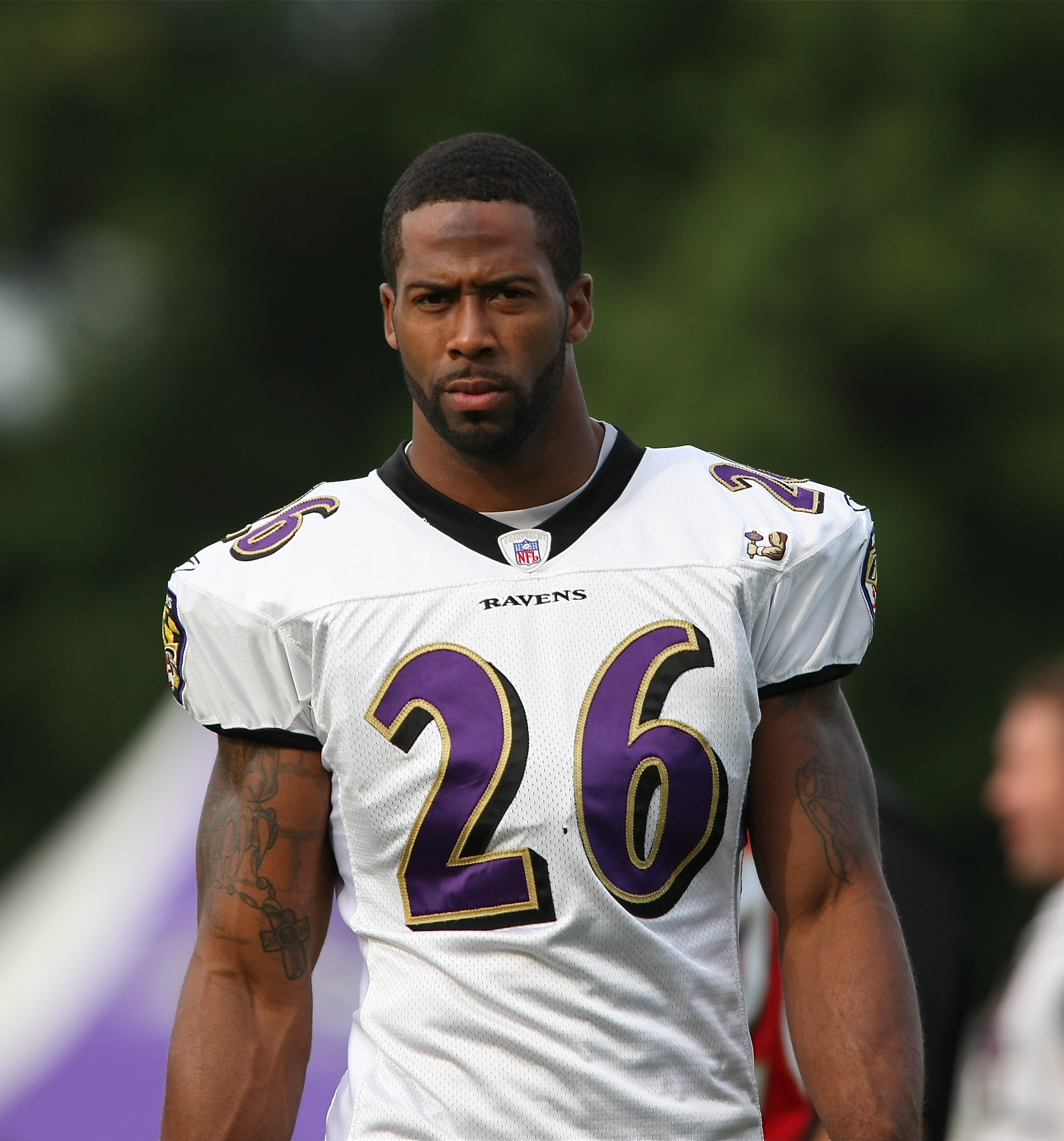
- Landry at Ravens training camp in 2008

No. 26
- Position: Safety

Personal information
- Born: December 30, 1982 (age 43); Ama, Louisiana, U.S.
- Listed height: 6 ft 1 in (1.85 m)
- Listed weight: 212 lb (96 kg)

Career information
- High school: Boutte (LA) Hahnville
- College: Georgia Tech
- NFL draft: 2006: 5th round, 146th overall pick

Career history
- Baltimore Ravens (2006–2010); Jacksonville Jaguars (2011–2012); New York Jets (2013–2014)

Awards and highlights
- Second-team All-ACC (2005); PFWA All-Rookie Team (2006)

Career NFL statistics
- Total tackles: 768
- Sacks: 8
- Forced fumbles: 3
- Fumble recoveries: 2
- Interceptions: 14
- Defensive touchdowns: 3
- Stats at Pro Football Reference

Dawan Frank Landry (born December 30, 1982) is an American former professional football player who was a safety in the National Football League (NFL). He was selected by the Baltimore Ravens in the fifth round of the 2006 NFL draft. He played college football at Georgia Tech.

== College career ==
While at Georgia Tech, he majored in Management. Dawan was a quarterback at Hahnville High School; he originally was redshirted to play quarterback in college but changed positions. Dawan, in four years, had 250 tackles, 12.5 tackles for loss, 7 interceptions, and four fumble recoveries. The most notable performance of Dawan's career was against Auburn in 2005 when he accumulated 10 tackles and an interception to help defeat the Tigers at Jordan–Hare Stadium 24–13.

== Professional career ==
Pre-draft measurables
| Height | Weight | Arm length | Hand span | 40-yard dash | 10-yard split | 20-yard split | 20-yard shuttle | Three-cone drill | Vertical jump | Broad jump | Bench press |
|---|---|---|---|---|---|---|---|---|---|---|---|
| 6 ft 0 7/8 in (1.85 m) | 220 lb (100 kg) | 31 in (0.79 m) | 9 5/8 in (0.24 m) | 4.60 s | 1.60 s | 2.71 s | 4.27 s | 6.99 s | 39.0 in (0.99 m) | 10 ft 8 in (3.25 m) | 20 reps |
All values from NFL Combine/Pro Day

=== Baltimore Ravens ===
The Baltimore Ravens selected Landry in the fifth round (146th overall) in the 2006 NFL draft. Landry was the 14th safety drafted in 2006.

On July 21, 2006, the Baltimore Ravens signed Landry to a three-year, $1.20 million contract that included a signing bonus of $129,000.

Throughout training camp, Landry competed to be the starting free safety against Gerome Sapp, Jamaine Winborne, B.J. Ward, and Robb Butler. Head coach Brian Billick opted to move Ed Reed to free safety and named Landry the starting strong safety to begin the regular season. Dawan's rookie season for the Baltimore Ravens saw him earn a starting spot in the defensive secondary alongside fellow safety Ed Reed. Dawan had a stellar rookie season, standing out on the league's #1 ranked Defense by collecting 69 tackles, 3 sacks, 6 passes defensed, and 5 interceptions for 101 yards and one touchdown.

Landry's season earned him one vote for AP Defensive Rookie of the Year, making him only one of seven players to earn a vote. In January, 2007, Landry was voted to the Pro Football Weekly PFWA All-Rookie Team as a starting defensive safety as well as Rick Gosselin's All-Rookie team as featured in The Dallas Morning News.

In his second season with the Ravens, 2007, he finished the campaign with 82 tackles, 1 sack, and 6 passes defensed, having the third most tackles on the defense, behind Bart Scott and Ray Lewis.

His third season in 2008 got off to a promising start, recording 11 tackles in the first two games of the season. However, in the second game, against the Cleveland Browns, he suffered what could have been a career-ending spinal concussion injury, tackling former Baltimore Raven Jamal Lewis. He was later judged to be okay, but his season was ended, as he was replaced by backup Jim Leonhard. He would miss out, as the Ravens would go on to advance to the AFC Championship.

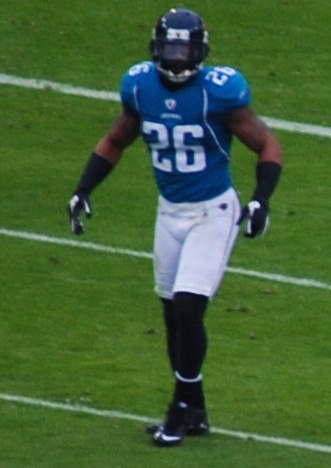
Landry with the Jaguars in 2011

In the 2009 offseason, he got himself back in game shape, and was read to take back his starting job. By all accounts, he enjoyed a successful comeback, posting career highs in tackles with 89, and passes defensed with 8. He also led the team in interceptions with four, returning one for a 48-yard touchdown against the Cleveland Browns, avenging his injury.

He continued his impressive play in 2010, recording 111 tackles, along with one sack and a forced fumble. In a game against the Carolina Panthers, fellow safety Ed Reed caught an interception, which he then lateraled to Landry, with Dawan taking it 23 yards for the go-ahead touchdown. Not only did he top his season best tackle count, with 111, but in the last two seasons he was second on the team in tackles, behind only Ray Lewis.

=== Jacksonville Jaguars ===
Landry agreed to terms on a five-year contract with the Jacksonville Jaguars on July 29, 2011. He finished his first season as a Jaguar with 97 tackles, two interceptions, one forced fumble, and half a sack. On November 16, 2012, Landry was fined $10,000 for a late hit against the Indianapolis Colts in Week 10.

On March 8, 2013, Landry was released by the Jaguars.

=== New York Jets ===
The New York Jets signed Landry on April 9, 2013.

== NFL career statistics ==
Legend
| **Bold** | Career high |

=== Regular season ===
| Year | Team | Games | | Tackles | | | | | Interceptions | | | | | Fumbles | | | |
| Year | Team | GP | GS | Cmb | Solo | Ast | Sck | TFL | Int | Yds | TD | Lng | PD | FF | FR | Yds | TD |
|---|---|---|---|---|---|---|---|---|---|---|---|---|---|---|---|---|---|
| 2006 | BAL | **16** | 14 | 69 | 48 | 21 | **3.0** | 4 | **5** | **101** | **1** | 37 | **11** | 0 | 0 | 0 | 0 |
| 2007 | BAL | **16** | **16** | 83 | 68 | 15 | 1.0 | 3 | 0 | 0 | 0 | 0 | 6 | 0 | 0 | 0 | 0 |
| 2008 | BAL | 2 | 2 | 11 | 8 | 3 | 0.0 | 0 | 0 | 0 | 0 | 0 | 0 | 0 | 0 | 0 | 0 |
| 2009 | BAL | **16** | **16** | 89 | 70 | 19 | 0.0 | **5** | 4 | 89 | **1** | **48** | 8 | **1** | 0 | 0 | 0 |
| 2010 | BAL | **16** | **16** | **111** | **86** | 25 | 1.0 | 2 | 1 | 23 | **1** | 23 | 4 | **1** | **1** | 0 | 0 |
| 2011 | JAX | **16** | **16** | 97 | 71 | 26 | 0.5 | 1 | 2 | 28 | 0 | 28 | 4 | **1** | **1** | 0 | 0 |
| 2012 | JAX | **16** | **16** | 100 | 81 | 19 | 0.0 | 0 | 1 | 47 | 0 | 47 | 2 | 0 | 0 | 0 | 0 |
| 2013 | NYJ | **16** | **16** | 101 | 63 | 38 | 1.0 | 2 | 1 | 38 | 0 | 38 | 7 | 0 | 0 | 0 | 0 |
| 2014 | NYJ | **16** | 14 | 107 | 67 | **40** | 1.5 | 1 | 0 | 0 | 0 | 0 | 1 | 0 | 0 | 0 | 0 |
| | | 130 | 126 | 768 | 562 | 206 | 8.0 | 18 | 14 | 326 | 3 | 48 | 43 | 3 | 2 | 0 | 0 |

=== Playoffs ===
| Year | Team | Games | | Tackles | | | | | Interceptions | | | | | Fumbles | | | |
| Year | Team | GP | GS | Cmb | Solo | Ast | Sck | TFL | Int | Yds | TD | Lng | PD | FF | FR | Yds | TD |
|---|---|---|---|---|---|---|---|---|---|---|---|---|---|---|---|---|---|
| 2006 | BAL | 1 | 1 | 3 | 2 | 1 | 0.0 | 0 | 0 | 0 | 0 | 0 | 0 | 0 | 0 | 0 | 0 |
| 2009 | BAL | **2** | **2** | **18** | **14** | 4 | 0.0 | 1 | **1** | **67** | 0 | **42** | **3** | 0 | 0 | 0 | 0 |
| 2010 | BAL | **2** | **2** | 15 | 8 | **7** | **0.5** | **3** | 1 | 9 | 0 | 9 | 2 | 0 | 0 | 0 | 0 |
| | | 5 | 5 | 36 | 24 | 12 | 0.5 | 4 | 2 | 76 | 0 | 42 | 5 | 0 | 0 | 0 | 0 |

== Personal life ==
Landry from Ama, Louisiana, is the older brother of former LSU All-American safety LaRon Landry, who was selected by the Washington Redskins in the first round of the 2007 NFL draft.
