= Channing Canada =

American football player (born 2002)

No. 29 – New England Patriots
- Position: Cornerback
- Roster status: Active

Personal information
- Born: August 17, 2002 (age 24); Boutte, Louisiana, U.S.
- Listed height: 5 ft 11 in (1.80 m)
- Listed weight: 190 lb (86 kg)

Career information
- High school: Hahnville (Boutte, Louisiana)
- College: Houston Baptist (2020–2021); Trinity Valley (2022); TCU (2023–2025)
- NFL draft: 2026: undrafted

Career history
- New England Patriots (2026–present)

Career NFL statistics as of Week 1, 2026
- Games played: 1
- Stats at Pro Football Reference

Channing Canada (born August 17, 2002) is an American professional football cornerback for the New England Patriots of the National Football League (NFL). He played college football for the Houston Baptist Huskies, the Trinity Valley Cardinals and TCU Horned Frogs.

== Early life and college career ==
Canada was born on August 17, 2002, and grew up in Boutte, Louisiana. He attended Hahnville High School where he played football. After playing his senior year in 2019, Canada, an unranked recruit, enrolled at Houston Baptist. He would then transfer to Trinity Valley Community College. He recorded 21 tackles and four passes defended in 2022 for the Cardinals.

Canada was ranked one of the top-five junior college recruits and transferred to the TCU Horned Frogs in 2023. He posted 20 tackles and a sack while appearing in 12 games, one as a starter, that year. Canada then posted 31 tackles and an interception in 2024 while appearing in 13 game with five starts. He became a full-time starter as a senior in 2025.

== Professional career ==
Pre-draft measurables
| Height | Weight | Arm length | Hand span | Wingspan | 40-yard dash | 10-yard split | 20-yard split | 20-yard shuttle | Three-cone drill | Vertical jump | Broad jump | Bench press |
|---|---|---|---|---|---|---|---|---|---|---|---|---|
| 5 ft 11 1/2 in (1.82 m) | 190 lb (86 kg) | 31 3/8 in (0.80 m) | 8 7/8 in (0.23 m) | 6 ft 2 3/4 in (1.90 m) | 4.36 s | 1.59 s | 2.55 s | 4.31 s | 7.05 s | 36.0 in (0.91 m) | 10 ft 6 in (3.20 m) | 15 reps |
All values from Pro Day

After going unselected in the 2026 NFL draft, Canada signed with the New England Patriots as an undrafted free agent. He made the team's initial roster for the 2026 season.
