= Bran flakes =

Breakfast cereal

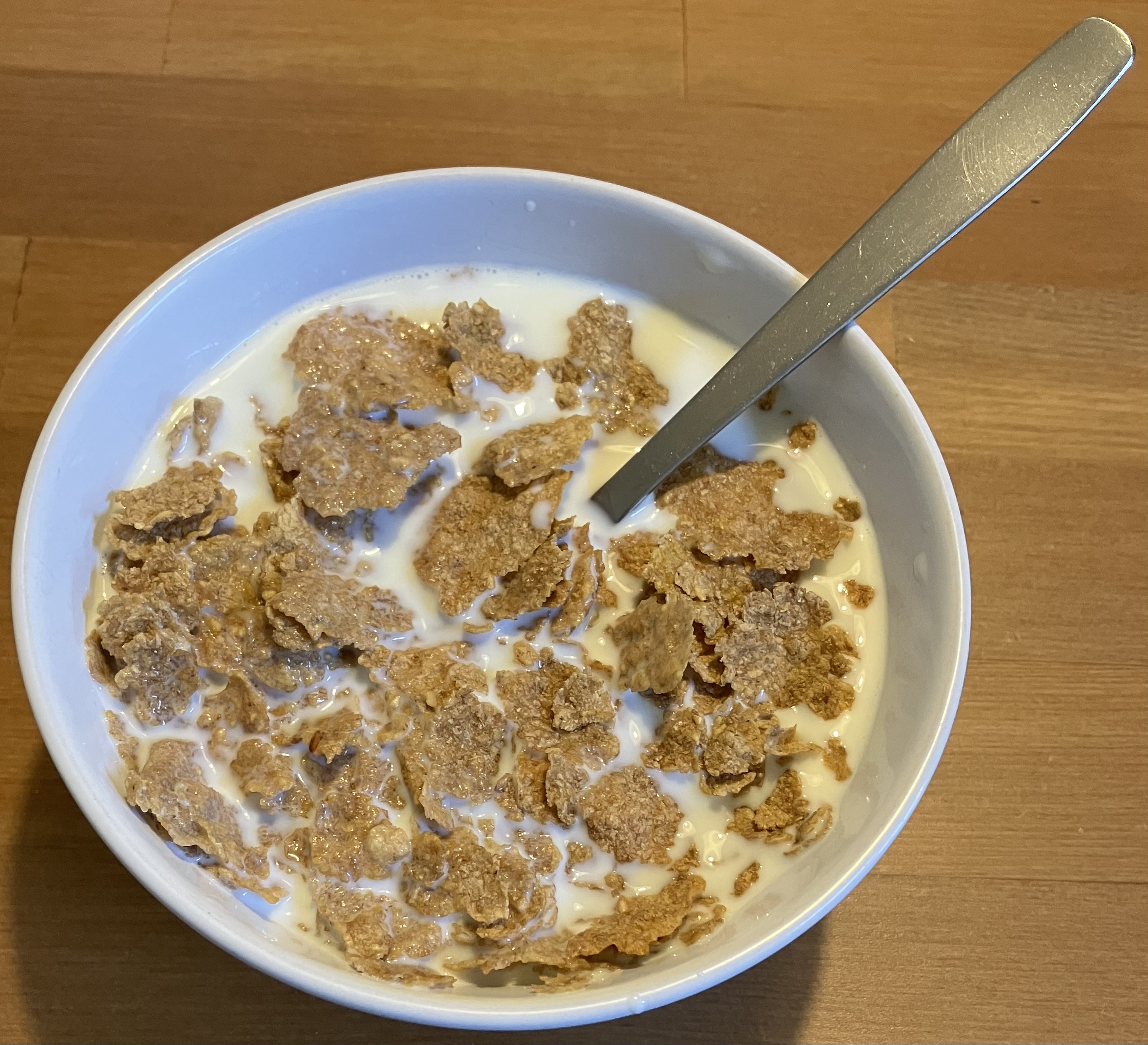
- Post Bran Flakes – Whole Grain Wheat and Bran Cereal, with milk
- Product type: Breakfast cereal
- Current owner: Post Holdings
- Produced by: Post Consumer Brands
- Country: U.S.
- Introduced: 1915; 111 years ago
- Previous owners: Kellogg's
- Website: postconsumer.com/branflakes

Bran flakes is a type of breakfast cereal similar to corn flakes. It consists of small toasted flakes of wheat or oat bran together with binders and seasoning. They may be nutritionally fortified. They are usually served cold with milk.

They have been available since 1915.

== Overview ==
Bran flakes have been produced by Kellogg's, by Post Consumer Brands, and by various other manufacturers under many generic brands.

Variants of bran flakes, with added dried fruit, include raisin bran, sultana bran, and Fruit and Fibre. Research suggests that eating commercially produced raisin bran containing sugared raisins elevates dental acids to plaque-forming levels; whereas home-made raisin bran, created by adding un-sugared raisins to bran flakes, does not produce this effect.

Bran flakes are high in dietary fiber. The consumption of dietary fiber can reduce the rate of increase in blood sugar and insulin levels after eating, thereby reducing the risk of contracting type 2 diabetes or a heart attack. It can also promote a healthy microbiome.

== See also ==
- Raisin bran
