= Boutte, Louisiana =

Boutte
- Census-designated place
- Location of Boutte in Louisiana
- Coordinates: 29°54′04″N 90°23′11″W
- Country: United States
- State: Louisiana
- Parish: St. Charles

Area
  - Total: 13.84 sq mi (35.85 km^{2})
  - Land: 13.78 sq mi (35.70 km^{2})
  - Water: 0.058 sq mi (0.15 km^{2})
- Elevation: 3 ft (0.91 m)

Population (2020)
  - Total: 3,054
  - Density: 221.5/sq mi (85.54/km^{2})
- Time zone: UTC-6 (CST)
  - Summer (DST): UTC-5 (CDT)
- Area code: 985
- FIPS code: 22-09130

Boutte is a census-designated place (CDP) in St. Charles Parish, Louisiana, United States. The population was 3,075 at the 2010 census, and 3,054 in 2020.

== Geography ==
Boutte is located at 29°54′4″N 90°23′11″W (29.901060, -90.386434).

According to the United States Census Bureau, the CDP has a total area of 3.8 square miles (9.8 km^{2}), of which 3.7 square miles (9.6 km^{2}) is land and 0.04 square miles (0.10 km^{2}) (0.80%) is water.

== Demographics ==
Historical population
Census	Pop.	Note	%±
1990	2,702		—
2000	2,181		−19.3%
2010	3,075		41.0%
2020	3,054		−0.7%
U.S. Decennial Census; 1950 1960 1970 1980; 1990 2000 2010

Boutte first appeared as a census designated place the 1990 U.S. census.

Boutte racial composition as of 2020
Race	Number	Percentage
White (non-Hispanic)	1,017	33.3%
Black or African American (non-Hispanic)	1,714	56.12%
Native American	7	0.23%
Asian	19	0.62%
Other/Mixed	84	2.75%
Hispanic or Latino	213	6.97%

As of the 2020 United States census, there were 3,054 people, 1,080 households, and 838 families residing in the CDP.

== Education ==
St. Charles Parish Public School System operates public schools:

- R. J. Vial Elementary School (grades 3–5) in Paradis - Opened in 1975
- J. B. Martin Middle School (grades 6–8) in Paradis
- Hahnville High School in Boutte

== Notable people ==
- Alfred Blue - NFL running back
- Channing Canada - NFL cornerback
- Garland Robinette - Journalist and news anchor
