= Tom Savage (American football) =

American football player (born 1990)

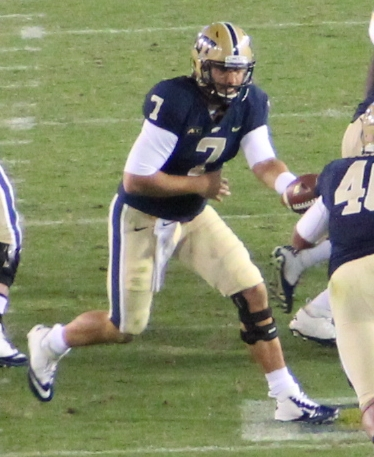
- Savage with the Pittsburgh Panthers in 2013

No. 3
- Position: Quarterback

Personal information
- Born: April 26, 1990 (age 36); Springfield, Pennsylvania, U.S.
- Listed height: 6 ft 4 in (1.93 m)
- Listed weight: 230 lb (104 kg)

Career information
- High school: Cardinal O'Hara (Springfield)
- College: Rutgers (2009–2010); Arizona (2011); Pittsburgh (2012–2013)
- NFL draft: 2014: 4th round, 135th overall pick

Career history
- Houston Texans (2014–2017); New Orleans Saints (2018)*; San Francisco 49ers (2018); Cincinnati Bengals (2018); Detroit Lions (2019)*
- * Offseason or practice squad member only

Career NFL statistics
- Passing attempts: 315
- Passing completions: 181
- Completion percentage: 57.5%
- TD–INT: 5–7
- Passing yards: 2,000
- Passer rating: 72.5
- Stats at Pro Football Reference

Thomas Benjamin Savage (born April 26, 1990) is an American former professional football player who was a quarterback in the National Football League (NFL). He played college football for the Rutgers Scarlet Knights, Arizona Wildcats, and Pittsburgh Panthers, and was selected by the Houston Texans in the fourth round of the 2014 NFL draft.

Savage spent the first four seasons of his career with the Texans; during his first three seasons, Savage was primarily a backup and missed the entire 2015 season due to injury. In 2017, he started the most games of his career at seven. After an offseason stint with the New Orleans Saints in 2018, Savage spent parts of the regular season with the San Francisco 49ers and Cincinnati Bengals without seeing any game action before having an offseason stint with the Detroit Lions in 2019.

== Early life ==
Savage was born in Springfield, Pennsylvania, on April 26, 1990, to Linda and Tom Savage. His older brother, Bryan, played quarterback at Wisconsin and Hofstra.

At Cardinal O'Hara High School, Savage was a member of the Lions football team for four years and started at quarterback for three. He threw for 1,355 yards and 10 touchdowns as a senior.

== College career ==
Savage enrolled at Rutgers University in 2009 under head coach Greg Schiano. After Rutgers opened the season with a 45–17 loss to Cincinnati, Savage was named the starting quarterback. He led the team to a 9–4 record. During his freshman year at Rutgers, Savage passed for 2,211 yards and 14 touchdowns, while throwing only seven interceptions. In arguably his best game of the year, Savage completed 14-of-27 passes for a season-high 294 yards and two touchdowns against the University of Central Florida during a 45–24 victory in the 2009 St. Petersburg Bowl. He was named on the All-American Freshman Team by the Football Writers Association of America (FWAA).

As a sophomore, Savage threw for 521 yards, two touchdowns, and three interceptions. Early in the season, he was sidelined by a hand injury and replaced with freshman quarterback Chas Dodd. Dodd remained the starting quarterback based on his performance against Connecticut in his first ever start. On January 8, 2011, Savage announced that he would transfer from Rutgers University. Rutgers granted Savage a conditional release, and he announced that he was transferring to Arizona in February 2011. Savage missed the 2011 season due to NCAA transfer rules, but was eligible to play in 2012.

Late in 2011, Savage announced his departure from Arizona, a move which followed the announcement that Arizona had hired Rich Rodriguez as head coach. Savage later transferred to Pittsburgh, where he redshirted in 2012. Savage initially wanted to play at Rutgers again; however, a hardship waiver was denied by the NCAA.

On August 14, 2013, Pitt head coach Paul Chryst officially named Savage the starting quarterback for the 2013 season opener against Florida State. On September 21 against Duke, he threw for 424 yards and six touchdowns in the 58–55 victory. Savage finished the season with 2,958 passing yards, 21 touchdowns, and nine interceptions.

Savage majored in communications.

== Professional career ==
Pre-draft measurables
Height	Weight	Arm length	Hand span	40-yard dash	10-yard split	20-yard split	20-yard shuttle	Three-cone drill	Vertical jump	Broad jump	Wonderlic
6 ft 3 7/8 in (1.93 m)	228 lb (103 kg)	31 5/8 in (0.80 m)	9 5/8 in (0.24 m)	4.97 s	1.77 s	2.92 s	4.36 s	7.33 s	27 in (0.69 m)	8 ft 9 in (2.67 m)	29
All values from NFL Combine

=== Houston Texans ===
==== 2014 season ====
Savage was selected by the Houston Texans in the fourth round (135th overall) of the 2014 NFL draft. He was the seventh quarterback to be selected that year.

On May 15, 2014, Savage signed a four-year contract with the Texans.

During a Week 13 45–21 victory over the Tennessee Titans, Savage made his NFL debut and had two kneel-down plays. Two weeks later against the Indianapolis Colts, he had his first significant playing time after Ryan Fitzpatrick broke his leg. Savage finished the 17–10 loss completing 10-of-19 passes for 127 yards and an interception.

==== 2015 season ====
On September 5, 2015, Savage was placed on injured reserve by the Texans with a shoulder injury. Due to his injury, Savage saw no playing time in 2015.

==== 2016 season ====
On December 18, 2016, Savage entered the Week 15 matchup against the Jacksonville Jaguars in the second quarter after starter Brock Osweiler was benched after throwing for 48 yards and back-to-back first-half interceptions. Savage brought the Texans back from a 13–0 deficit and completed 23-of-36 passes for 260 yards as he led the Texans to a narrow 21–20 comeback victory. Savage was named the starter for the Week 16 matchup against the Cincinnati Bengals. In that game, he completed 18 of 29 passes for 176 yards during the narrow 12–10 victory, clinching the AFC South title for the Texans. During the regular-season finale against the Titans, Savage completed five of eight passes for 25 yards before leaving the eventual 24–17 road loss in the second quarter with an apparent concussion, but later returned to the game for one play, which was a kneel down at the end of the half. During halftime, he was re-evaluated for a concussion and ruled out for the rest of the game.

Savage finished the 2016 season with 461 passing yards and no touchdowns or interceptions in three games and two starts. Osweiler started in the Wild Card Round against the Oakland Raiders due to Savage's injury, which the Texans won by a score of 27–14. Shortly after the game, head coach Bill O'Brien announced that Osweiler would remain the team's starter for the Divisional Round against the New England Patriots. Savage then cleared concussion protocol and was Osweiler's backup in the Divisional Round, where the Texans lost on the road by a score of 34–16.

==== 2017 season ====
In 2017, Savage was competing for the Texans' starting job after the team drafted Deshaun Watson in the first round. After a strong preseason, Savage was named the starter to begin the season. He started in the season-opening 29–7 loss to the Jaguars, but was benched at halftime in favor of Watson. Savage completed 7-of-13 passes for 62 yards, was sacked six times, and fumbled twice, including one that was returned for a touchdown by defensive end Dante Fowler, making the score 19–0 at halftime. Watson then started the next six games for the Texans.

On November 2, Watson tore his ACL during practice, prematurely ending his season and putting Savage in line to be the starter. Savage then started in the Week 9 20–14 loss to the Colts, completing 19-of-44 passes for 219 yards and his first NFL touchdown, a 34-yard pass to wide receiver DeAndre Hopkins during the fourth quarter. Two weeks later against the Arizona Cardinals, Savage had his first two-touchdown game, completing 22-of-32 passes for 230 yards for the two aforementioned touchdowns and an interception in the 31–21 victory. During a Week 13 24–13 road loss to the Titans, he had a career-high 365 passing yards, a touchdown, and an interception. In the next game against the San Francisco 49ers, Savage completed six of 12 passes for 63 yards before leaving the eventual 26–16 loss late in the second quarter after suffering a concussion. He was placed on injured reserve on December 23, 2017. During the process, the Texans were suspected to have violated the concussion protocol policy but were not disciplined.

Savage finished the 2017 season with 1,412 passing yards, five touchdowns, and six interceptions in eight games and seven starts.

=== New Orleans Saints ===
On March 16, 2018, Savage signed a one-year, $1.5 million contract with the New Orleans Saints. He was released on September 1 after Teddy Bridgewater was named the backup quarterback.

=== San Francisco 49ers ===
On October 16, 2018, Savage signed with the San Francisco 49ers. He was released on October 20, but was re-signed two days later. Savage was released on November 1, but was re-signed the next day. He was waived again on November 24.

=== Cincinnati Bengals ===
On November 26, 2018, Savage was claimed off waivers by the Cincinnati Bengals.

=== Detroit Lions ===
On April 9, 2019, Savage signed with the Detroit Lions. He was released on August 31.

== Career statistics ==
=== NFL ===
Year	Team	Games		Passing								Rushing			
Year	Team	GP	GS	Cmp	Att	Pct	Yds	Y/A	TD	Int	Rtg	Att	Yds	Avg	TD
2014	HOU	2	0	10	19	52.6	127	6.7	0	1	51.9	6	−6	−1.0	0
2015	HOU	0	0	Did not play due to injury											
2016	HOU	3	2	46	73	63.0	461	6.3	0	0	80.9	6	12	2.0	0
2017	HOU	8	7	125	223	56.1	1,412	6.3	5	6	71.4	4	2	0.5	0
Career		13	9	181	315	57.5	2,000	6.3	5	7	72.5	16	8	0.5	0

=== College ===
Season	Team	Passing								Rushing			
Season	Team	Cmp	Att	Pct	Yds	Y/A	TD	Int	Rtg	Att	Yds	Avg	TD
2009	Rutgers	149	285	52.3	2,211	7.8	14	7	128.7	59	−105	−1.8	1
2010	Rutgers	43	83	51.8	521	6.3	2	3	105.3	32	−6	−0.2	0
2013	Pittsburgh	238	389	61.2	2,958	7.6	21	9	138.2	76	−208	−2.7	3
Career		430	757	56.8	5,690	7.5	37	19	131.1	167	−319	−1.9	4

== Personal life ==
Savage married Catie Varley in 2015. They have two children.
