= Eddie Pleasant =

American football player (born 1988)

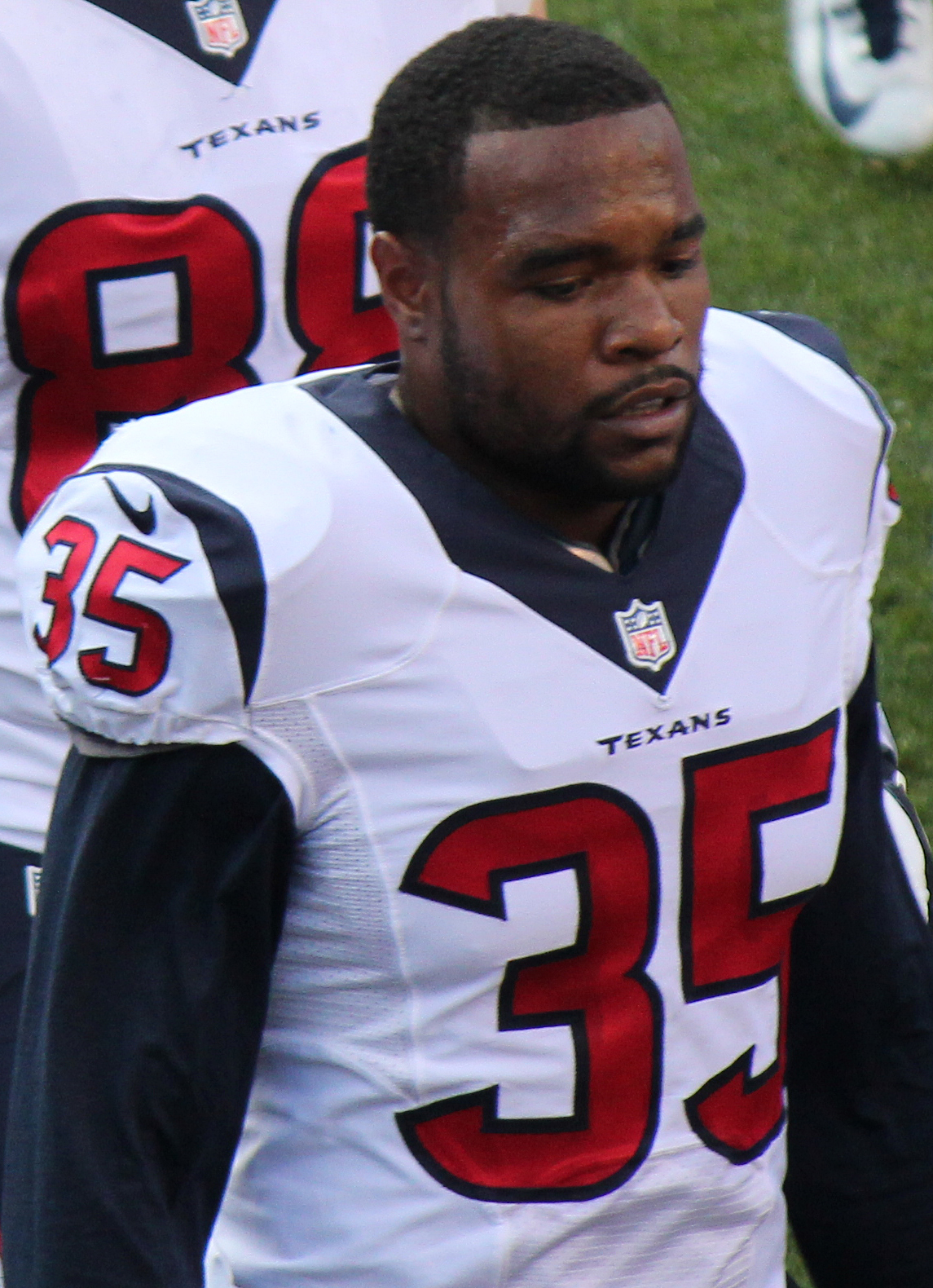
- Pleasant with the Houston Texans in 2014

No. 35, 26
- Position: Safety

Personal information
- Born: December 17, 1988 (age 37); Compton, California, U.S.
- Listed height: 5 ft 10 in (1.78 m)
- Listed weight: 210 lb (95 kg)

Career information
- High school: John F. Kennedy (La Palma, California)
- College: Oregon
- NFL draft: 2012: undrafted

Career history
- Houston Texans (2012–2017); New England Patriots (2018)*; Arizona Cardinals (2018); Green Bay Packers (2018)
- * Offseason or practice squad member only

Awards and highlights
- First-team All-Pac-12 (2011)

Career NFL statistics
- Total tackles: 124
- Sacks: 2.5
- Pass deflections: 17
- Forced fumbles: 1
- Interceptions: 3
- Stats at Pro Football Reference

Edward Joseph Pleasant (born December 17, 1988) is an American former professional football player who was a safety in the National Football League (NFL). He was signed by the Houston Texans as an undrafted free agent in 2012. He played college football for the Oregon Ducks.

== Professional career ==
=== Houston Texans ===
Pleasant was signed by the Houston Texans as an undrafted free agent on May 14, 2012. He was released on August 31, 2012 and was signed to the practice squad the next day. He was signed to the active roster on December 21, 2012.

Pleasant re-signed with the Texans on April 1, 2015.

From 2015 to 2017, Pleasant was a leader on special teams and provided depth as a backup strong safety.

=== New England Patriots ===
On July 24, 2018, Pleasant signed with the New England Patriots. He was released on August 26, 2018.

=== Arizona Cardinals ===
On October 20, 2018, Pleasant signed with the Arizona Cardinals. He was released on November 13, 2018.

=== Green Bay Packers ===
On November 28, 2018, Pleasant was signed by the Green Bay Packers.

== NFL career statistics ==
=== Regular season ===
Year	Team	Games		Tackles				Interceptions						Fumbles	
Year	Team	GP	GS	Comb	Total	Ast	Sack	Int	Yards	Avg	Long	TD	PD	FF	FR
2012	HOU	2	0	1	1	0	0	0	0	0	0	0	0	0	0
2013	HOU	16	1	21	20	1	0	0	0	0	0	0	2	0	0
2015	HOU	14	0	6	5	1	0	0	0	0	0	0	1	0	0
2015	HOU	16	0	36	24	12	0.5	2	−1	−0.5	0	0	6	0	1
2016	HOU	14	0	20	16	4	0	0	0	0	0	0	5	0	0
2017	HOU	16	0	32	25	7	2.0	1	0	0	0	0	3	1	0
2018	ARI	1	0	1	1	0	0	0	0	0	0	0	0	0	0
2018	GB	5	1	7	4	3	0	0	0	0	0	0	0	0	0
Total		84	2	124	96	28	2.5	3	−1		0	0	17	1	1
Source: NFL.com
