= 2017 Houston Texans season =

16th season in franchise history; last full one under ownership of Bob McNair

- Owner: Bob McNair
- General manager: Rick Smith
- Head coach: Bill O'Brien
- Defensive coordinator: Mike Vrabel
- Home stadium: NRG Stadium

Results
- Record: 4–12
- Division place: 4th AFC South
- Playoffs: Did not qualify
- All-Pros: WR DeAndre Hopkins (1st team)
- Pro Bowlers: WR DeAndre Hopkins; LB Jadeveon Clowney

Uniform
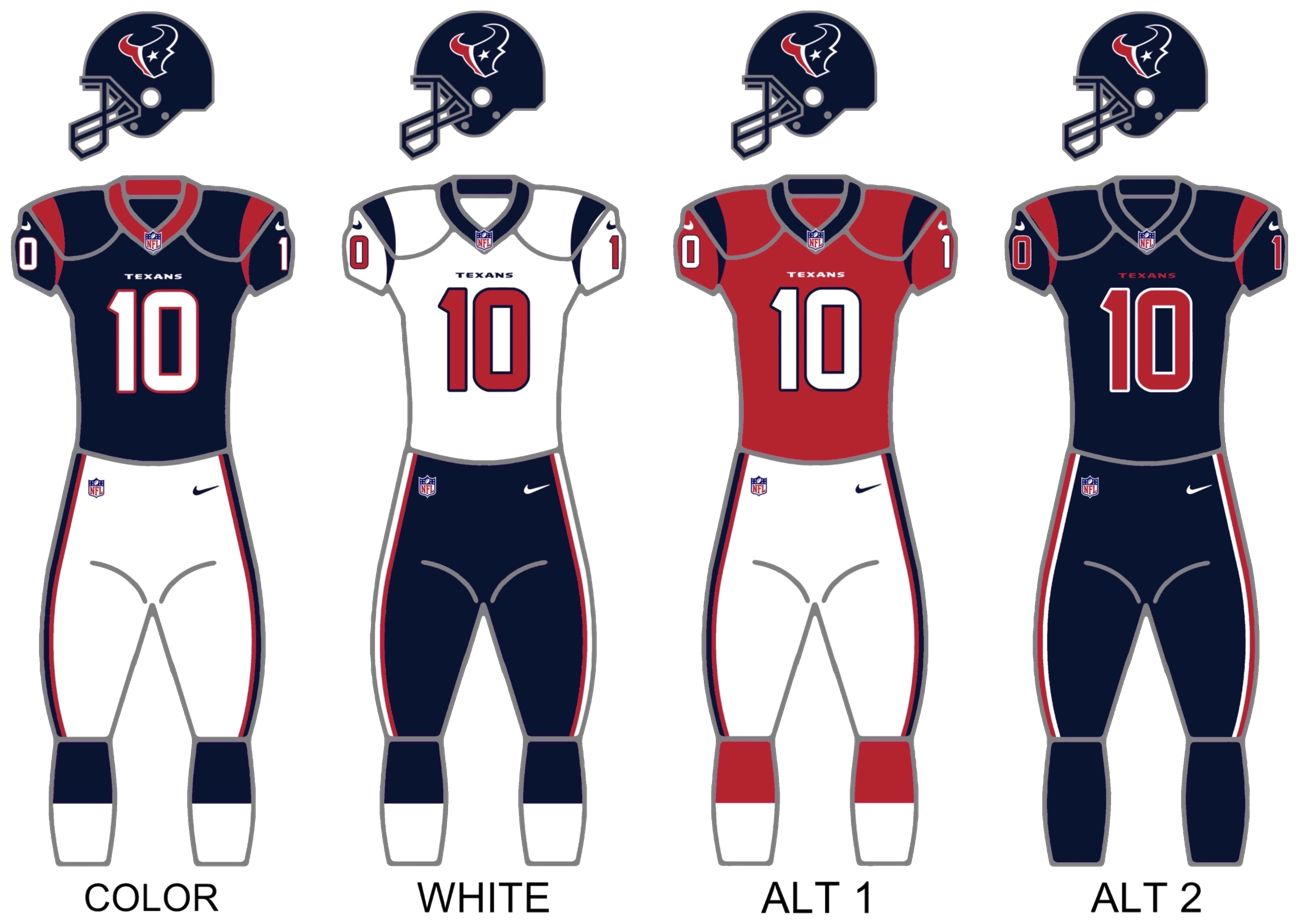

The 2017 season was the Houston Texans' 16th in the National Football League (NFL) and their fourth under head coach Bill O'Brien. With the Texans' loss at the Titans in Week 13, Houston exceeded their loss total (7) from 2014, 2015 and 2016. The Texans clinched their first losing season since 2013 (and their first under Bill O'Brien), and finished in last place in the AFC South for the first time since 2013. The Texans also missed the playoffs for the first time since 2014.

The team were with high hopes with Deshaun Watson as their starting quarterback who broke rookie records in his starts. However, after a loss in Week 8, Watson tore his ACL during practice that ruled him out for the rest of the season. The team was forced to turn to backup Tom Savage to replace Watson. Savage could not fill the void and the Texans limped to a 4–12 finish, tied for second worst in the AFC standings with the Indianapolis Colts. The team was also affected by the loss of defensive end J. J. Watt, who for the second consecutive season was lost early, this time after suffering an injury in Week 5.

This was also the last full season under the ownership of Bob McNair, who died during the 2018 season.

== Draft ==
2017 Houston Texans draft
Round	Pick	Player	Position	College	Notes
1	12	Deshaun Watson *	QB	Clemson	from Philadelphia via Cleveland
2	57	Zach Cunningham	LB	Vanderbilt	
3	89	D'Onta Foreman	RB	Texas	
4	130	Julién Davenport	OT	Bucknell	
4	142	Carlos Watkins	DT	Clemson	Compensatory pick, from Cleveland
5	169	Treston Decoud	CB	Oregon State	
7	243	Kyle Fuller	C	Baylor	
Made roster † Pro Football Hall of Fame * Made at least one Pro Bowl during career

Notes

- The Texans acquired a fourth-round compensatory selection (No. 142 overall) from the Cleveland Browns in exchange for Houston's sixth-round selection (No. 188 overall), 2018 second-round selection, and quarterback Brock Osweiler.
- The Texans acquired an additional sixth-round selection (No. 188 overall) in a trade that sent tight end Khari Lee to the Chicago Bears.
- The Texans traded their original sixth-round selection (No. 209 overall), along with their first-round selection in 2016 (22nd) to the Washington Redskins in exchange for the Redskins' first-round selection in 2016 (21st).

== Coaching changes ==
On January 16, the Texans and offensive coordinator George Godsey mutually parted ways after the team finished 29th in total yards for the 2016 season. Two days later the Texans announced that defensive coordinator Romeo Crennel had been promoted to assistant head coach while linebackers coach Mike Vrabel would become the team's new defensive coordinator. On January 31, it was announced that Wes Welker had been hired as an offensive/special teams assistant coach for the Texans.

== Staff ==
2017 Houston Texans staff
Front office: Founder/chairman/CEO – Bob McNair; Vice chairman – D. Cal McNair; Executive vice president/general manager – Rick Smith; President – Jamey Rootes; Vice president of football administration – Chris Olsen; Vice president of football operations – Doug West; Vice president of player personnel/assistant general manager – Jimmy Raye III; Director of college scouting – Jon Carr; Director of pro personnel – Rob Kisiel; Director of football research – Jim Bernhardt; Assistant director of college scouting – Mike Martin; Assistant director of pro personnel – Larry Wright; Head coaches: Head coach – Bill O'Brien; Assistant head coach-defense – Romeo Crennel; Offensive coaches: Quarterbacks – Sean Ryan; Running backs – Charles London; Wide receivers – John Perry; Tight ends – Tim Kelly; Offensive line – Mike Devlin; Offensive assistant/assistant offensive line – Will Lawing; Offensive assistant/quarterbacks – Pat O'Hara; Offensive assistant/special teams assistant – Wes Welker	Defensive coaches: Defensive coordinator – Mike Vrabel; Defensive line – Anthony Weaver; Linebackers – Bobby King; Secondary – John Butler; Assistant secondary – Anthony Midget; Defensive assistant – Shane Bowen; Special teams coaches: Special teams coordinator – Larry Izzo; Assistant special teams coordinator – Doug Colman; Strength and conditioning: Head strength and conditioning – Craig Fitzgerald; Assistant strength and conditioning – Ian Jones; Assistant strength and conditioning – Brian Bell

== Final roster ==
2017 Houston Texans roster
Quarterbacks (QB): 8 Taylor Heinicke; 5 Josh Johnson; 2 T. J. Yates; Running backs (RB): 28 Alfred Blue; 38 Andre Ellington; 26 Lamar Miller; 45 Jay Prosch FB; 22 Jordan Todman; Wide receivers (WR): 15 Will Fuller; 17 Cobi Hamilton; 10 DeAndre Hopkins; 13 Braxton Miller; 14 Chris Thompson RS; 11 DeAndrew White; Tight ends (TE): 89 Stephen Anderson; 88 Ryan Malleck	Offensive linemen (OL): 79 Jeff Allen G; 70 Julién Davenport T; 61 Kyle Fuller C; 68 Breno Giacomini T; 63 Kendall Lamm T; 65 Greg Mancz C; 77 David Quessenberry T; 62 Chad Slade G; 71 Xavier Suʻa-Filo G; Defensive linemen (DL): 97 Angelo Blackson DE; 96 Chunky Clements NT; 92 Brandon Dunn NT; 93 Joel Heath DE; 94 Ufomba Kamalu DE; 91 Carlos Watkins DE	Linebackers (LB): 90 Jadeveon Clowney OLB; 51 Dylan Cole ILB; 41 Zach Cunningham ILB; 56 Brian Cushing OLB; 44 Jelani Jenkins ILB; 54 LaTroy Lewis OLB; 55 Benardrick McKinney ILB; 52 Brian Peters ILB; 53 Gimel President OLB; Defensive backs (DB): 39 Ibraheim Campbell SS; 31 Treston Decoud CB; 23 Kurtis Drummond FS; 21 Marcus Gilchrist SS; 29 Andre Hal FS; 25 Kareem Jackson CB; 30 Kevin Johnson CB; 24 Johnathan Joseph CB; 35 Eddie Pleasant SS; 40 Marcus Williams CB; Special teams (ST): 7 Kaʻimi Fairbairn K; 9 Shane Lechler P; 46 Jon Weeks LS	Practice squad: 78 Erik Austell C; 86 Zach Conque TE; 47 Kennan Gilchrist ILB; 67 Marcus Hardison NT; 37 Bryce Jones CB; 33 Troymaine Pope RB; 81 Jevoni Robinson TE; 73 Jake Rodgers T; 36 Josh Thornton CB; 32 Dee Virgin CB; Reserve: 74 Chris Clark T (IR); 95 Christian Covington DE (IR); 12 Bruce Ellington WR (IR); 34 Tyler Ervin RB (IR); 87 C. J. Fiedorowicz TE (IR); 27 D'Onta Foreman RB (IR); 69 Matthew Godin DE (IR); 16 Deanté Gray WR (IR); 84 Ryan Griffin TE (IR); 50 Ben Heeney ILB (IR); 66 Nick Martin C (IR); 59 Whitney Mercilus OLB (IR); 43 Corey Moore SS (IR); 72 Derek Newton RT (PUP); 85 MyCole Pruitt TE (IR); 98 D. J. Reader NT (IR); 3 Tom Savage QB (IR); 57 Brennan Scarlett OLB (IR); 4 Deshaun Watson QB (IR); 99 J. J. Watt DE (IR); Rookies in italics 53 active, 20 reserve, 10 practice squad

== Preseason ==
Week	Date	Opponent	Result	Record	Venue	Recap
1	August 9	at Carolina Panthers	L 17–27	0–1	Bank of America Stadium	Recap
2	August 19	New England Patriots	W 27–23	1–1	NRG Stadium	Recap
3	August 26	at New Orleans Saints	L 0–13	1–2	Mercedes-Benz Superdome	Recap
4	August 31	Dallas Cowboys	Cancelled due to Hurricane Harvey†			

† The game was originally scheduled for August 31, and to be moved from its original venue, NRG Stadium, to the Cowboys' AT&T Stadium, due to public safety concerns regarding flooding in the Houston area from the remnants of Hurricane Harvey. However, the game was later cancelled in order to allow Texans players and coaches to return to Houston after the storm.

== Regular season ==
=== Schedule ===
Week	Date	Opponent	Result	Record	Venue	Recap
1	September 10	**Jacksonville Jaguars**	**L** 7–29	0–1	NRG Stadium	Recap
2	September 14	at Cincinnati Bengals	**W** 13–9	1–1	Paul Brown Stadium	Recap
3	September 24	at New England Patriots	**L** 33–36	1–2	Gillette Stadium	Recap
4	October 1	**Tennessee Titans**	**W** 57–14	2–2	NRG Stadium	Recap
5	October 8	Kansas City Chiefs	**L** 34–42	2–3	NRG Stadium	Recap
6	October 15	Cleveland Browns	**W** 33–17	3–3	NRG Stadium	Recap
7	Bye					
8	October 29	at Seattle Seahawks	**L** 38–41	3–4	CenturyLink Field	Recap
9	November 5	**Indianapolis Colts**	**L** 14–20	3–5	NRG Stadium	Recap
10	November 12	at Los Angeles Rams	**L** 7–33	3–6	Los Angeles Memorial Coliseum	Recap
11	November 19	Arizona Cardinals	**W** 31–21	4–6	NRG Stadium	Recap
12	November 27	at Baltimore Ravens	**L** 16–23	4–7	M&T Bank Stadium	Recap
13	December 3	at **Tennessee Titans**	**L** 13–24	4–8	Nissan Stadium	Recap
14	December 10	San Francisco 49ers	**L** 16–26	4–9	NRG Stadium	Recap
15	December 17	at **Jacksonville Jaguars**	**L** 7–45	4–10	EverBank Field	Recap
16	December 25	Pittsburgh Steelers	**L** 6–34	4–11	NRG Stadium	Recap
17	December 31	at **Indianapolis Colts**	**L** 13–22	4–12	Lucas Oil Stadium	Recap

Note: Intra-division opponents are in bold text.

=== Game summaries ===
==== Week 1: vs. Jacksonville Jaguars ====
Week One: Jacksonville Jaguars at Houston Texans – Game summary

Quarter	1	2	3	4	Total
**Jaguars**	3	16	7	3	**29**
Texans	0	0	7	0	**7**

at NRG Stadium, Houston, Texas

- Date: September 10
- Game time: 12:00 p.m. CDT
- Game weather: Played indoors (retractable roof closed)
- Game attendance: 71,710
- Referee: Tony Corrente
- TV announcers (CBS): Andrew Catalon, James Lofton and Steve Tasker
- Recap, Gamebook

Game information

**First quarter**

- JAX – Jason Myers 42-yard field goal, 12:12. Jaguars 3–0. **Drive: 8 plays, 51 yards, 2:52.**

**Second quarter**

- JAX – Jason Myers 25-yard field goal, 14:52. Jaguars 6–0. **Drive: 10 plays, 77 yards, 5:11.**
- JAX – Leonard Fournette 1-yard run (kick failed), 2:02. Jaguars 12–0. **Drive: 9 plays, 53 yards, 5:29.**
- JAX – Dante Fowler 53-yard fumble recovery (Jason Myers kick), 0:49. Jaguars 19–0. **Drive: 5 plays, 28 yards, 1:13.**

**Third quarter**

- HOU – DeAndre Hopkins 4-yard pass from Deshaun Watson (Kaʻimi Fairbairn kick), 9:09. Jaguars 19–7. **Drive: 14 plays, 75 yards, 5:51.**
- JAX – Tommy Bohanon 1-yard pass from Blake Bortles (Jason Myers kick), 4:14. Jaguars 25–7. **Drive: 10 plays, 75 yards, 4:55.**

**Fourth quarter**

- JAX – Jason Myers 38-yard field goal, 3:15. Jaguars 29–7. **Drive: 4 plays, 7 yards, 0:16.**

**Top passers**

- JAX – Blake Bortles – 11/21, 125 yards, TD
- HOU – Deshaun Watson – 12/23, 102 yards, TD, INT

**Top rushers**

- JAX – Leonard Fournette – 26 carries, 100 yards, TD
- HOU – Lamar Miller – 17 carries, 65 yards

**Top receivers**

- JAX – Allen Hurns – 3 receptions, 42 yards
- HOU – DeAndre Hopkins – 7 receptions, 55 yards, TD

Top Tacklers

- JAX – Myles Jack – 8 tackles, 6 assists
- HOU – Benardrick McKinney – 4 tackles, 7 assists

The Texans' offensive line played poorly in the game, giving up a total of 10 sacks. Tom Savage started at quarterback for Houston and was sacked 6 times for a total loss of 33 yards. Savage was benched at halftime, finishing the game 7/13 with 62 yards and fumbled twice. Rookie quarterback Deshaun Watson entered the game in the second half and ended the first drive on a 4-yard touchdown pass to DeAndre Hopkins. Watson didn't fare much better behind the poor offensive line play, being sacked 4 times for a total loss of 21 yards with one fumble. Watson finished the game 12/23 for 102 yards with one touchdown and an interception along with 2 rushes for 16 yards.

Linebacker Brian Cushing was suspended 10 games without pay following the game for violating the NFL's PED policy.

==== Week 2: at Cincinnati Bengals ====
Week Two: Houston Texans at Cincinnati Bengals – Game summary

Quarter	1	2	3	4	Total
**Texans**	3	7	0	3	**13**
Bengals	0	6	3	0	**9**

at Paul Brown Stadium, Cincinnati, Ohio

- Date: September 14
- Game time: 8:25 p.m. EDT/7:25 p.m. CDT
- Game weather: 69 °F (21 °C), mostly cloudy
- Game attendance: 52,942
- Referee: Clete Blakeman
- TV announcers (NFLN): Mike Tirico, Cris Collinsworth and Heather Cox
- Recap, Gamebook

Game information

**First quarter**

- HOU – Kaʻimi Fairbairn 26-yard field goal, 1:32. Texans 3–0. **Drive: 6 plays, 12 yards, 3:04.**

**Second quarter**

- CIN – Randy Bullock 39-yard field goal, 13:48. Tied 3–3. **Drive: 5 plays, 43 yards, 2:44.**
- HOU – Deshaun Watson 49-yard run (Kaʻimi Fairbairn kick), 0:50. Texans 10–3. **Drive: 9 plays, 94 yards, 3:40.**
- CIN – Randy Bullock 29-yard field goal, 0:06. Texans 10–6. **Drive: 6 plays, 64 yards, 0:48.**

**Third quarter**

- CIN – Randy Bullock 30-yard field goal, 6:30. Texans 10–9. **Drive: 15 plays, 63 yards, 8:24.**

**Fourth quarter**

- HOU – Kaʻimi Fairbairn 42-yard field goal, 2:01. Texans 13–9. **Drive: 13 plays, 66 yards, 6:19.**

**Top passers**

- HOU – Deshaun Watson – 15/24, 125 yards
- CIN – Andy Dalton – 20/35, 224 yards

**Top rushers**

- HOU – Deshaun Watson – 5 carries, 67 yards, TD
- CIN – Joe Mixon – 9 carries, 36 yards

**Top receivers**

- HOU – DeAndre Hopkins – 7 receptions, 73 yards
- CIN – A. J. Green – 5 receptions, 67 yards

Top Tacklers

- HOU – Kareem Jackson – 5 tackles, 3 assists, sack
- CIN – Vincent Rey – 6 tackles, 5 assists

Deshaun Watson started his first NFL game for the Texans against the Bengals on Thursday Night Football. Watson scored the team's only touchdown of the game on a 49-yard run while the Bengals failed to score a touchdown.

==== Week 3: at New England Patriots ====
Week Three: Houston Texans at New England Patriots – Game summary

Quarter	1	2	3	4	Total
Texans	10	10	7	6	**33**
**Patriots**	7	14	7	8	**36**

at Gillette Stadium, Foxborough, Massachusetts

- Date: September 24
- Game time: 1:00 p.m. EDT/12:00 p.m. CDT
- Game weather: 84 °F (29 °C), Sunny
- Game attendance: 65,878
- Referee: John Parry
- TV announcers (CBS): Ian Eagle, Dan Fouts and Evan Washburn
- Recap, Gamebook

Game information

**First quarter**

- NE – Rob Gronkowski 5-yard pass from Tom Brady (Stephen Gostkowski kick), 10:33. Patriots 7–0. **Drive: 7 plays, 51 yards, 2:59.**
- HOU – Kaʻimi Fairbairn 39-yard field goal, 7:22. Patriots 7–3. **Drive: 6 plays, 57 yards, 3:11.**
- HOU – Bruce Ellington 29-yard pass from Deshaun Watson (Kaʻimi Fairbairn kick), 1:51. Texans 10–7. **Drive: 2 plays, 44 yards, 0:40.**

**Second quarter**

- NE – Chris Hogan 7-yard pass from Tom Brady (Stephen Gostkowski kick), 12:25. Patriots 14–10. **Drive: 1 plays, 12 yards, 0:32.**
- HOU – Kaʻimi Fairbairn 40-yard field goal, 7:01. Patriots 14–13. **Drive: 10 plays, 55 yards, 5:24.**
- HOU – Jadeveon Clowney 22-yard fumble recovery (Kaʻimi Fairbairn kick), 6:15. Texans 20–14. **Drive: 2 plays, -3 yards, 0:46.**
- NE – Chris Hogan 47-yard pass from Tom Brady (Stephen Gostkowski kick), 3:58. Patriots 21–20. **Drive: 6 plays, 75 yards, 2:17.**

**Third quarter**

- NE – Brandin Cooks 42-yard pass from Tom Brady (Stephen Gostkowski kick), 12:45. Patriots 28–20. **Drive: 5 plays, 81 yards, 2:15.**
- HOU – Ryan Griffin 12-yard pass from Deshaun Watson (Kaʻimi Fairbairn kick), 7:12. Patriots 28–27. **Drive: 10 plays, 70 yards, 5:33.**

**Fourth quarter**

- HOU – Kaʻimi Fairbairn 31-yard field goal, 12:13. Texans 30–28. **Drive: 12 plays, 67 yards, 4:29.**
- HOU – Kaʻimi Fairbairn 36-yard field goal, 2:28. Texans 33–28. **Drive: 7 plays, 49 yards, 3:31.**
- NE – Brandin Cooks 25-yard pass from Tom Brady (Tom Brady–Brandin Cooks pass), 0:23. Patriots 36–33. **Drive: 8 plays, 75 yards, 2:01.**

**Top passers**

- HOU – Deshaun Watson – 22/32, 301 yards, 2 TD, 2 INT
- NE – Tom Brady – 25/35, 378 yards, 5 TD

**Top rushers**

- HOU – Lamar Miller – 14 carries, 56 yards
- NE – Mike Gillislee – 12 carries, 31 yards

**Top receivers**

- HOU – DeAndre Hopkins – 7 receptions, 76 yards
- NE – Brandin Cooks – 5 receptions, 131 yards, 2 TD

Top Tacklers

- HOU – Jadeveon Clowney – 6 tackles, 2 sacks
- NE – Kyle Van Noy – 9 tackles, 2 assists

Trying to get their first ever win in New England and only their second ever win against the Patriots, the Texans led 33–28 with 2:28 remaining, but Tom Brady threw the game winning touchdown to Brandin Cooks with 23 seconds remaining. With the loss, the Texans fell to 1–2. They also fell to 1–9 all time against the Patriots, and 0–6 against them in Foxborough.

==== Week 4: vs. Tennessee Titans ====
Week Four: Tennessee Titans at Houston Texans – Game summary

Quarter	1	2	3	4	Total
Titans	0	14	0	0	**14**
**Texans**	14	16	7	20	**57**

at NRG Stadium, Houston, Texas

- Date: October 1
- Game time: 12:00 p.m. CDT
- Game weather: Played indoors (retractable roof closed)
- Game attendance: 71,804
- Referee: Jeff Triplette
- TV announcers (CBS): Kevin Harlan and Rich Gannon
- Recap, Gamebook

Game information

**First quarter**

- HOU – Lamar Miller 2-yard run (Kaʻimi Fairbairn kick), 12:13. Texans 7–0. **Drive: 4 plays, 43 yards, 1:48.**
- HOU – DeAndre Hopkins 8-yard pass from Deshaun Watson (Kaʻimi Fairbairn kick), 5:09. Texans 14–0. **Drive: 11 plays, 76 yards, 5:07.**

**Second quarter**

- HOU – Will Fuller 16-yard pass from Deshaun Watson (Kaʻimi Fairbairn kick), 14:54. Texans 21–0. **Drive: 9 plays, 76 yards, 3:47.**
- TEN – Marcus Mariota 34-yard run (Ryan Succop kick), 11:44. Texans 21–7. **Drive: 5 plays, 75 yards, 3:10.**
- HOU – Kaʻimi Fairbairn 50-yard field goal, 6:06. Texans 24–7. **Drive: 12 plays, 43 yards, 5:38.**
- TEN – Marcus Mariota 2-yard run (Ryan Succop kick), 1:50. Texans 24–14. **Drive: 7 plays, 75 yards, 4:11.**
- HOU – Deshaun Watson 1-yard run (kick failed), 1:19. Texans 30–14. **Drive: 1 play, 58 yards, 0:31.**

**Third quarter**

- HOU – Will Fuller 10-yard pass from Deshaun Watson (Kaʻimi Fairbairn kick), 6:51. Texans 37–14. **Drive: 14 plays, 75 yards, 8:09.**

**Fourth quarter**

- HOU – Lamar Miller 8-yard pass from Deshaun Watson (Kaʻimi Fairbairn kick), 11:19. Texans 44–14. **Drive: 9 plays, 73 yards, 5:27.**
- HOU – Kaʻimi Fairbairn 40-yard field goal, 8:44. Texans 47–14. **Drive: 5 plays, 20 yards, 2:11.**
- HOU – Dylan Cole 25-yard interception return (Kaʻimi Fairbairn kick), 8:31. Texans 54–14. **Drive: 1 play, 0 yards, 0:08.**
- HOU – Kaʻimi Fairbairn 33-yard field goal, 3:39. Texans 57–14. **Drive: 3 plays, 0 yards, 1:24.**

**Top passers**

- TEN – Marcus Mariota – 6/10, 96 yards, 2 INT
- HOU – Deshaun Watson – 25/34, 283 yards, 4 TD, INT

**Top rushers**

- TEN – Marcus Mariota – 4 carries, 39 yards, 2 TD
- HOU – Lamar Miller – 19 carries, 75 yards, TD

**Top receivers**

- TEN – Delanie Walker – 3 receptions, 51 yards
- HOU – DeAndre Hopkins – 10 receptions, 107 yards, TD

Top Tacklers

- TEN – Jurrell Casey – 5 tackles, 2 assists, sack
- HOU – Dylan Cole – 3 tackles, 2 assists, INT

The Texans never punted during the first half, with four drives ending in a touchdown and one in a 50-yard field goal from Kaʻimi Fairbairn. On Houston's last possession of the half, a Deshaun Watson pass was intercepted by Kevin Byard. Andre Hal intercepted two Marcus Mariota passes during the half. The Texans' first punt came on their second possession of the second half, with 3:27 left in the 3rd quarter. The 30 points scored in the first half are the second most in franchise history. Houston defeated Tennessee by a score of 57–14, the most points scored in a single game in franchise history.

==== Week 5: vs. Kansas City Chiefs ====
Week Five: Kansas City Chiefs at Houston Texans – Game summary

Quarter	1	2	3	4	Total
**Chiefs**	3	20	0	19	**42**
Texans	0	7	6	21	**34**

at NRG Stadium, Houston, Texas

- Date: October 8
- Game time: 7:30 p.m. CDT
- Game weather: Played indoors (retractable roof closed)
- Game attendance: 71,835
- Referee: Ronald Torbert
- TV announcers (NBC): Al Michaels, Cris Collinsworth and Michele Tafoya
- Recap, Gamebook

Game information

**First quarter**

- KC – Harrison Butker 35-yard field goal, 6:57. Chiefs 3–0. **Drive: 15 plays, 64 yards, 8:07.**

**Second quarter**

- KC – Harrison Butker 42-yard field goal, 11:28. Chiefs 6–0. **Drive: 11 plays, 65 yards, 6:21.**
- KC – Charcandrick West 8-yard pass from Alex Smith (Harrison Butker kick), 5:45. Chiefs 13–0. **Drive: 8 plays, 62 yards, 4:52.**
- KC – Harrison Butker 41-yard field goal, 4:21. Chiefs 16–0. **Drive: 4 plays, 3 yards, 0:51.**
- HOU – DeAndre Hopkins 6-yard pass from Deshaun Watson (Kaʻimi Fairbairn kick), 1:49. Chiefs 16–7. **Drive: 8 plays, 75 yards, 2:28.**
- KC – Charcandrick West 4-yard pass from Alex Smith (Harrison Butker kick), 0:34. Chiefs 23–7. **Drive: 7 plays, 75 yards, 1:15.**

**Third quarter**

- HOU – Will Fuller 9-yard pass from Deshaun Watson (pass failed), 3:20. Chiefs 23–13. **Drive: 7 plays, 78 yards, 3:58.**

**Fourth quarter**

- KC – Harrison Butker 35-yard field goal, 14:05. Chiefs 26–13. **Drive: 10 plays, 58 yards, 4:15.**
- HOU – Will Fuller 48-yard pass from Deshaun Watson (Kaʻimi Fairbairn kick), 12:00. Chiefs 26–20. **Drive: 5 plays, 70 yards, 2:01.**
- KC – De'Anthony Thomas 10-yard pass from Alex Smith (pass failed), 8:57. Chiefs 32–20. **Drive: 6 plays, 70 yards, 3:03.**
- KC – Tyreek Hill 82-yard punt return (Harrison Butker kick), 7:22. Chiefs 39–20.
- HOU – DeAndre Hopkins 34-yard pass from Deshaun Watson (pass failed), 3:05. Chiefs 39–26. **Drive: 3 plays, 37 yards, 0:16.**
- KC – Harrison Butker 49-yard field goal, 1:13. Chiefs 42–26. **Drive: 4 plays, 5 yards, 1:49.**
- HOU – DeAndre Hopkins 1-yard pass from Deshaun Watson (Deshaun Watson run), 0:00. Chiefs 42–34. **Drive: 7 plays, 75 yards, 1:08.**

**Top passers**

- KC – Alex Smith – 29/37, 324 yards, 3 TD
- HOU – Deshaun Watson – 16/31, 261 yards, 5 TD

**Top rushers**

- KC – Kareem Hunt – 29 carries, 107 yards
- HOU – Lamar Miller – 15 carries, 74 yards

**Top receivers**

- KC – Travis Kelce – 8 receptions, 98 yards
- HOU – Stephen Anderson – 2 receptions, 63 yards

Top Tacklers

- KC – Ron Parker – 5 tackles, 3 assists
- HOU – Marcus Gilchrist – 7 tackles, 2 assists

Coming back from a blowout win against Tennessee, the Texans went to face an undefeated Chiefs team. However, tragedy struck when DE J. J. Watt suffered a season-ending leg injury in the first quarter that was later revealed to be a tibial plateau fracture to his left leg. OLB Whitney Mercilus also suffered a season-ending pectoral injury. Taking advantage of the Watt injury, the Chiefs jumped out to a 16–0 lead 26 minutes into the game. Houston came within 6 points of the lead early in the fourth quarter, but the Texans defense could not keep up with the Chiefs offense. The Chiefs won by 8 points and the Texans fell to 2–3 on the season.

Watt and Mercilus ended up having a major impact on the team, the team going 2–10 without them (including the Chiefs game) and 2–2 with them.

==== Week 6: vs. Cleveland Browns ====
Week Six: Cleveland Browns at Houston Texans – Game summary

Quarter	1	2	3	4	Total
Browns	3	0	0	14	**17**
**Texans**	10	14	9	0	**33**

at NRG Stadium, Houston, Texas

- Date: October 15
- Game time: 12:00 p.m. CDT
- Game weather: Played indoors (retractable roof closed)
- Game attendance: 71,815
- Referee: Brad Allen
- TV announcers (CBS): Andrew Catalon and James Lofton
- Recap, Gamebook

Game information

**First quarter**

- HOU – Kaʻimi Fairbairn 40-yard field goal, 10:57. Texans 3–0. **Drive: 10 plays, 52 yards, 4:03.**
- CLE – Zane Gonzalez 41-yard field goal, 3:15. Tied 3–3. **Drive: 4 plays, 4 yards, 1:34.**
- HOU – Will Fuller 39-yard pass from Deshaun Watson (Kaʻimi Fairbairn kick), 0:41. Texans 10–3. **Drive: 5 plays, 87 yards, 2:34.**

**Second quarter**

- HOU – Johnathan Joseph 82-yard interception return (kick failed), 11:08. Texans 16–3. **Drive: 9 plays, 53 yards, 4:33.**
- HOU – Braxton Miller 1-yard pass from Deshaun Watson (Ryan Griffin pass), 4:05. Texans 24–3. **Drive: 6 plays, 71 yards, 2:49.**

**Third quarter**

- HOU – Penalty on Kevin Hogan enforced in CLE end zone for a safety, 10:10. Texans 26–3. **Drive: 3 plays, -3 yards, 1:28.**
- HOU – DeAndre Hopkins 3-yard pass from Deshaun Watson (Kaʻimi Fairbairn kick), 4:05. Texans 33–3. **Drive: 13 plays, 65 yards, 6:05.**

**Fourth quarter**

- CLE – Jason McCourty 56-yard interception return (Zane Gonzalez kick), 13:27. Texans 33–10. **Drive: 4 plays, 21 yards, 1:53.**
- CLE – Seth DeValve 3-yard pass from Kevin Hogan (Zane Gonzalez kick), 1:03. Texans 33–17. **Drive: 4 plays, 50 yards, 0:46.**

**Top passers**

- CLE – Kevin Hogan – 20/37, 140 yards, TD, 3 INT
- HOU – Deshaun Watson – 17/29, 225 yards, 3 TD, INT

**Top rushers**

- CLE – Isaiah Crowell – 12 carries, 58 yards
- HOU – D'Onta Foreman – 12 carries, 59 yards

**Top receivers**

- CLE – Kasen Williams – 4 receptions, 41 yards
- HOU – Will Fuller – 2 receptions, 62 yards, TD

Top Tacklers

- CLE – Joe Schobert – 5 tackles, 7 assists
- HOU – Benardrick McKinney – 7 tackles, assist

The Texans started the year 3–3; however, this was their high point of the season. They suffered another major injury in week 9 and went 1–9 from week 7 onwards.

==== Week 8: at Seattle Seahawks ====
Week Eight: Houston Texans at Seattle Seahawks – Game summary

Quarter	1	2	3	4	Total
Texans	14	7	3	14	**38**
**Seahawks**	14	7	6	14	**41**

at CenturyLink Field, Seattle, Washington

- Date: October 29
- Game time: 3:05 p.m. CDT/1:05 p.m. PDT
- Game weather: 56 °F (13 °C), cloudy
- Game attendance: 69,025
- Referee: Terry McAulay
- TV announcers (CBS): Kevin Harlan, Rich Gannon and Dana Jacobson
- Recap, Gamebook

Game information

**First quarter**

- HOU – Will Fuller 59-yard pass from Deshaun Watson (Kaʻimi Fairbairn kick), 12:38. Texans 7–0. **Drive: 5 plays, 75 yards, 2:22.**
- SEA – Earl Thomas 78-yard interception return (Blair Walsh kick), 10:08. Tied 7–7. **Drive: 4 plays, 27 yards, 1:19.**
- HOU – Lamar Miller 3-yard run (Kaʻimi Fairbairn kick), 6:08. Texans 14–7. **Drive: 8 plays, 82 yards, 4:00.**
- SEA – Paul Richardson 20-yard pass from Russell Wilson (Blair Walsh kick), 2:11. Tied 14–14. **Drive: 8 plays, 75 yards, 3:57.**

**Second quarter**

- HOU – Will Fuller 20-yard pass from Deshaun Watson (Kaʻimi Fairbairn kick), 9:34. Texans 21–14. **Drive: 11 plays, 84 yards, 5:06.**
- SEA – Paul Richardson 7-yard pass from Russell Wilson (Blair Walsh kick), 6:02. Tied 21–21. **Drive: 6 plays, 75 yards, 3:32.**

**Third quarter**

- HOU – Kaʻimi Fairbairn 31-yard field goal, 7:08. Texans 24–21. **Drive: 10 plays, 63 yards, 4:19.**
- SEA – Blair Walsh 21-yard field goal, 4:39. Tied 24–24. **Drive: 6 plays, 75 yards, 2:29.**
- SEA – Blair Walsh 21-yard field goal, 2:27. Seahawks 27–24. **Drive: 5 plays, 5 yards, 1:21.**

**Fourth quarter**

- HOU – Lamar Miller 2-yard pass from Deshaun Watson (Kaʻimi Fairbairn kick), 9:09. Texans 31–27. **Drive: 5 plays, 71 yards, 2:16.**
- SEA – Jimmy Graham 1-yard pass from Russell Wilson (Blair Walsh kick), 5:37. Seahwaks 34–31. **Drive: 7 plays, 75 yards, 3:32.**
- HOU – DeAndre Hopkins 72-yard pass from Deshaun Watson (Kaʻimi Fairbairn kick), 5:01. Texans 38–34. **Drive: 2 plays, 75 yards, 0:48.**
- SEA – Jimmy Graham 18-yard pass from Russell Wilson (Blair Walsh kick), 0:21. Seahawks 41–38. **Drive: 3 plays, 80 yards, 1:18.**

**Top passers**

- HOU – Deshaun Watson – 19/30, 402 yards, 4 TD, 3 INT
- SEA – Russell Wilson – 26/41, 452 yards, 4 TD, INT

**Top rushers**

- HOU – Deshaun Watson – 8 carries, 67 yards
- SEA – Russell Wilson – 4 carries, 30 yards

**Top receivers**

- HOU – DeAndre Hopkins – 8 receptions, 224 yards, TD
- SEA – Tyler Lockett – 6 receptions, 121 yards

Top Tacklers

- HOU – Kareem Jackson – 4 tackles, assist
- SEA – K. J. Wright – 9 tackles, 6 assists

==== Week 9: vs. Indianapolis Colts ====
Week Nine: Indianapolis Colts at Houston Texans – Game summary

Quarter	1	2	3	4	Total
**Colts**	7	3	7	3	**20**
Texans	0	7	0	7	**14**

at NRG Stadium, Houston, Texas

- Date: November 5
- Game time: 12:00 p.m. CST
- Game weather: Played indoors (retractable roof closed)
- Game attendance: 71,709
- Referee: John Parry
- TV announcers (CBS): Greg Gumbel, Trent Green and Jamie Erdahl
- Recap, Gamebook

Game information

**First quarter**

- IND – T. Y. Hilton 45-yard pass from Jacoby Brissett (Adam Vinatieri kick), 8:33. Colts 7–0. **Drive: 7 plays, 92 yards, 4:00.**

**Second quarter**

- IND – Adam Vinatieri 22-yard field goal, 4:37. Colts 10–0. **Drive: 10 plays, 51 yards, 4:53.**
- HOU – Lamarr Houston 34-yard fumble recovery (Kaʻimi Fairbairn kick), 0:56. Colts 10–7. **Drive: 7 plays, 14 yards, 0:56.**

**Third quarter**

- IND – T. Y. Hilton 80-yard pass from Jacoby Brissett (Adam Vinatieri kick), 1:56. Colts 17–7. **Drive: 6 plays, 91 yards, 3:45.**

**Fourth quarter**

- IND – Adam Vinatieri 53-yard field goal, 9:17. Colts 20–7. **Drive: 7 plays, 60 yards, 3:46.**
- HOU – DeAndre Hopkins 34-yard pass from Tom Savage (Kaʻimi Fairbairn kick), 6:11. Colts 20–14. **Drive: 6 plays, 75 yards, 3:01.**

**Top passers**

- IND – Jacoby Brissett – 20/30, 308 yards, 2 TD
- HOU – Tom Savage – 19/44, 219 yards, TD

**Top rushers**

- IND – Frank Gore – 17 carries, 51 yards
- HOU – Lamar Miller – 10 carries, 57 yards

**Top receivers**

- IND – T. Y. Hilton – 5 receptions, 175 yards, 2 TD
- HOU – DeAndre Hopkins – 6 receptions, 86 yards, TD

Top Tacklers

- IND – Matthias Farley – 6 tackles, 2 assists
- HOU – Kevin Johnson – 5 tackles

The Texans suffered a serious blow when quarterback Deshaun Watson tore his ACL during practice and was lost for the season. Tom Savage was named the starter for Houston with T. J. Yates and Matt McGloin being signed as backups.

The Texans only had 96 yards of total offense in the first half with Savage completing 7 passes on 19 attempts for 76 yards. The Colts scored on their first drive with Jacoby Brissett finding T. Y. Hilton for a 45-yard touchdown pass. In the 2nd quarter, Houston kicker Kaʻimi Fairbairn missed his first field goal of the season on a 39-yard attempt. The Texans got their first score after Eddie Pleasant sacked Brissett at the Indianapolis 34-yard line. Brissett fumbled the football on the sack with it being recovered by Lamarr Houston who returned it 34 yards for a touchdown. The first half ended with Brissett being sacked by Pleasant again for a loss of 6 yards and a 1-yard run from Frank Gore. Savage threw his first NFL touchdown pass on a 34-yard pass to DeAndre Hopkins in the 4th quarter.

- Note: In the third quarter, the Sutherland Springs church shootings happened during a commercial break in which CBS cut to a special news report during the commercial break. Greg Gumbel, after the commercial break, said a prayer before Indianapolis kicked off after scoring.

==== Week 10: at Los Angeles Rams ====
Week Ten: Houston Texans at Los Angeles Rams – Game summary

Quarter	1	2	3	4	Total
Texans	0	7	0	0	**7**
**Rams**	3	6	21	3	**33**

at Los Angeles Memorial Coliseum, Los Angeles, California

- Date: November 12
- Game time: 3:05 p.m. CST/1:05 p.m. PST
- Game weather: 68 °F (20 °C), cloudy
- Game attendance: 60,032
- Referee: Pete Morelli
- TV announcers (CBS): Ian Eagle, Dan Fouts and Evan Washburn
- Recap, Gamebook

Game information

**First quarter**

- LAR – Greg Zuerlein 27-yard field goal, 11:14. Rams 3–0. **Drive: 4 plays, 3 yards, 1:22.**

**Second quarter**

- LAR – Greg Zuerlein 33-yard field goal, 10:22. Rams 6–0. **Drive: 6 plays, 62 yards, 3:04.**
- HOU – Bruce Ellington 26-yard pass from Tom Savage (Kaʻimi Fairbairn kick), 6:31. Texans 7–6. **Drive: 8 plays, 75 yards, 3:46.**
- LAR – Greg Zuerlein 50-yard field goal, 0:23. Rams 9–7. **Drive: 10 plays, 43 yards, 1:21.**

**Third quarter**

- LAR – Robert Woods 94-yard pass from Jared Goff (Greg Zuerlein kick), 9:23. Rams 16–7. **Drive: 2 plays, 96 yards, 0:33.**
- LAR – Sammy Watkins 17-yard pass from Jared Goff (Greg Zuerlein kick), 1:33. Rams 23–7. **Drive: 3 plays, 36 yards, 1:18.**
- LAR – Robert Woods 12-yard pass from Jared Goff (Greg Zuerlein kick), 1:14. Rams 30–7. **Drive: 1 play, 12 yards, 0:10.**

**Fourth quarter**

- LAR – Greg Zuerlein 33-yard field goal, 7:38. Rams 33–7. **Drive: 9 plays, 74 yards, 6:21.**

**Top passers**

- HOU – Tom Savage – 18/36, 221 yards, TD, 2 INT
- LAR – Jared Goff – 25/37, 355 yards, 3 TD

**Top rushers**

- HOU – Lamar Miller – 11 carries, 60 yards
- LAR – Todd Gurley – 11 carries, 68 yards

**Top receivers**

- HOU – DeAndre Hopkins – 7 receptions, 111 yards
- LAR – Robert Woods – 8 receptions, 171 yards, 2 TD

Top Tacklers

- HOU – Johnathan Joseph and Kareem Jackson – 4 tackles, assist each
- LAR – Alec Ogletree – 4 tackles, 3 assists

==== Week 11: vs. Arizona Cardinals ====
Week Eleven: Arizona Cardinals at Houston Texans – Game summary

Quarter	1	2	3	4	Total
Cardinals	0	14	7	0	**21**
**Texans**	0	10	7	14	**31**

at NRG Stadium, Houston, Texas

- Date: November 19
- Game time: 12:00 p.m. CST
- Game weather: Played indoors (retractable roof closed)
- Game attendance: 71,680
- Referee: Ed Hochuli
- TV announcers (Fox): Kenny Albert, Ronde Barber and Kristina Pink
- Recap, Gamebook

Game information

**First quarter**

- No scoring plays

**Second quarter**

- HOU – Lamar Miller 7-yard pass from Tom Savage (Kaʻimi Fairbairn kick), 14:12. Texans 7–0. **Drive: 12 plays, 89 yards, 6:58.**
- ARI – Larry Fitzgerald 20-yard pass from Blaine Gabbert (Phil Dawson kick), 7:20. Tied 7–7. **Drive: 2 plays, 17 yards, 0:47.**
- ARI – Ricky Seals-Jones 11-yard pass from Blaine Gabbert (Phil Dawson kick), 1:53. Cardinals 14–7. **Drive: 2 plays, 15 yards, 0:29.**
- HOU – Kaʻimi Fairbairn 34-yard field goal, 0:09. Cardinals 14–10. **Drive: 8 plays, 59 yards, 1:48.**

**Third quarter**

- HOU – DeAndre Hopkins 28-yard pass from Tom Savage (Kaʻimi Fairbairn kick), 11:02. Texans 17–14. **Drive: 7 plays, 74 yards, 3:58.**
- ARI – Ricky Seals-Jones 28-yard pass from Blaine Gabbert (Phil Dawson kick), 4:41. Cardinals 21–17. **Drive: 7 plays, 51 yards, 3:45.**

**Fourth quarter**

- HOU – D'Onta Foreman 3-yard run (Kaʻimi Fairbairn kick), 13:13. Texans 24–21. **Drive: 11 plays, 75 yards, 6:28.**
- HOU – D'Onta Foreman 34-yard run (Kaʻimi Fairbairn kick), 6:26. Texans 31–21. **Drive: 1 play, 34 yards, 0:07.**

**Top passers**

- ARI – Blaine Gabbert – 21/33, 237 yards, 2 TD, 2 INT
- HOU – Tom Savage – 22/32, 230 yards, 2 TD, INT

**Top rushers**

- ARI – Adrian Peterson – 14 carries, 26 yards
- HOU – D'Onta Foreman – 10 carries, 65 yards, 2 TD

**Top receivers**

- ARI – Larry Fitzgerald – 9 receptions, 91 yards, TD
- HOU – DeAndre Hopkins – 4 receptions, 76 yards, TD

Top Tacklers

- ARI – Deone Bucannon – 9 tackles, 4 assists
- HOU – Benardrick McKinney – 7 tackles, 2 assists

After struggling for the past 2 weeks, the Texans' offense improved against the Cardinals, scoring 4 touchdowns. Tom Savage threw 2 touchdowns in the game: a 7-yard pass to Lamar Miller in the 1st quarter and a 28-yard pass to DeAndre Hopkins in the 3rd quarter. Rookie running back D'Onta Foreman rushed for 2 touchdowns on a 3-yard run and a 34-yard run. Foreman was carted off the field after his 2nd touchdown with a lower leg injury.

Savage turned the ball over twice in the game, fumbling after being sacked by Budda Baker and throwing an interception to Patrick Peterson. Arizona scored a touchdown following both Houston turnovers. Blaine Gabbert threw 2 interceptions: one to Eddie Pleasant and one to Andre Hal.

==== Week 12: at Baltimore Ravens ====
Week Twelve: Houston Texans at Baltimore Ravens – Game summary

Quarter	1	2	3	4	Total
Texans	7	3	3	3	**16**
**Ravens**	0	17	0	6	**23**

at M&T Bank Stadium, Baltimore, Maryland

- Date: November 27
- Game time: 8:30 p.m. EST/7:30 p.m. CST
- Game weather: 50 °F (10 °C), fair
- Game attendance: 70,357
- Referee: Brad Allen
- TV announcers (ESPN): Sean McDonough, Jon Gruden and Lisa Salters
- Recap, Gamebook

Game information

**First quarter**

- HOU – Lamar Miller 4-yard run (Kaʻimi Fairbairn kick), 8:49. Texans 7–0. **Drive: 9 plays, 90 yards, 5:25.**

**Second quarter**

- BAL – Javorius Allen 10-yard run (Justin Tucker kick), 11:10. Tied 7–7. **Drive: 7 plays, 50 yards, 3:12.**
- BAL – Alex Collins 8-yard run (Justin Tucker kick), 6:44. Ravens 14–7. **Drive: 5 plays, 46 yards, 2:26.**
- HOU – Kaʻimi Fairbairn 25-yard field goal, 1:52. Ravens 14–10. **Drive: 13 plays, 68 yards, 4:56.**
- BAL – Justin Tucker 53-yard field goal, 0:12. Ravens 17–10. **Drive: 11 plays, 48 yards, 1:41.**

**Third quarter**

- HOU – Kaʻimi Fairbairn 36-yard field goal, 4:40. Ravens 17–13. **Drive: 13 plays, 65 yards, 6:20.**

**Fourth quarter**

- BAL – Justin Tucker 31-yard field goal, 10:59. Ravens 20–13. **Drive: 10 plays, 36 yards, 5:27.**
- HOU – Kaʻimi Fairbairn 37-yard field goal, 8:40. Ravens 20–16. **Drive: 7 plays, 56 yards, 2:18.**
- BAL – Justin Tucker 49-yard field goal, 2:58. Ravens 23–16. **Drive: 6 plays, 18 yards, 1:51.**

**Top passers**

- HOU – Tom Savage – 22/37, 252 yards, 2 INT
- BAL – Joe Flacco – 20/32, 141 yards

**Top rushers**

- HOU – Lamar Miller – 17 rushes, 51 yards, TD
- BAL – Alex Collins – 16 rushes, 60 yards, TD

**Top receivers**

- HOU – DeAndre Hopkins – 7 receptions, 125 yards
- BAL – Mike Wallace – 5 receptions, 48 yards

**Top tacklers**

- HOU – Kevin Johnson – 7 tackles
- BAL – C. J. Mosley – 12 tackles

==== Week 13: at Tennessee Titans ====
Week Thirteen: Houston Texans at Tennessee Titans – Game summary

Quarter	1	2	3	4	Total
Texans	3	7	0	3	**13**
**Titans**	0	10	7	7	**24**

at Nissan Stadium, Nashville, Tennessee

- Date: December 3
- Game time: 12:00 p.m. CST
- Game weather: 60 °F (16 °C), sunny
- Game attendance: 62,758
- Referee: Clete Blakeman
- TV announcers (CBS): Greg Gumbel, Trent Green and Jamie Erdahl
- Recap, Gamebook

Game information

**First quarter**

- HOU – Kaʻimi Fairbairn 23-yard field goal, 9:25. Texans 3–0. **Drive: 9 plays, 36 yards, 3:39.**

**Second quarter**

- HOU – Stephen Anderson 4-yard pass from Tom Savage (Kaʻimi Fairbairn kick), 10:40. Texans 10–0. **Drive: 7 plays, 87 yards, 3:17.**
- TEN – Marcus Mariota 9-yard run (Ryan Succop kick), 4:18. Texans 10–7. **Drive: 10 plays, 75 yards, 6:22.**
- TEN – Ryan Succop 43-yard field goal, 0:04. Tied 10–10. **Drive: 4 plays, 37 yards, 0:35.**

**Third quarter**

- TEN – Delanie Walker 24-yard pass from Marcus Mariota (Ryan Succop kick), 0:03. Titans 17–10. **Drive: 10 plays, 80 yards, 5:17.**

**Fourth quarter**

- HOU – Kaʻimi Fairbairn 42-yard field goal, 4:42. Titans 17–13. **Drive: 12 plays, 57 yards, 6:49.**
- TEN – Derrick Henry 75-yard run (Ryan Succop kick), 0:46. Titans 24–13. **Drive: 3 plays, 80 yards, 0:22.**

**Top passers**

- HOU – Tom Savage – 31/49, 365 yards, TD, INT
- TEN – Marcus Mariota – 15/23, 150 yards, TD

**Top rushers**

- HOU – Lamar Miller – 15 carries, 56 yards
- TEN – Derrick Henry – 11 carries, 109 yards, TD

**Top receivers**

- HOU – DeAndre Hopkins – 8 receptions, 80 yards
- TEN – Delanie Walker – 5 receptions, 63 yards, TD

Top Tacklers

- HOU –
- TEN –

==== Week 14: vs. San Francisco 49ers ====
Battle Red Day

Week Fourteen: San Francisco 49ers at Houston Texans – Game summary

Quarter	1	2	3	4	Total
**49ers**	0	13	10	3	**26**
Texans	3	6	7	0	**16**

at NRG Stadium, Houston, Texas

- Date: December 10
- Game time: 12:00 p.m. CST
- Game weather: Played indoors (retractable roof closed)
- Game attendance: 71,802
- Referee: John Hussey
- TV announcers (Fox): Dick Stockton, Mark Schlereth and Shannon Spake
- Recap, Gamebook

Game information

**First quarter**

- HOU – Kaʻimi Fairbairn 55-yard field goal, 9:08. Texans 3–0. **Drive: 7 plays, 30 yards, 4:16.**

**Second quarter**

- SF – Robbie Gould 52-yard field goal, 6:36. Tied 3–3. **Drive: 5 plays, 31 yards, 2:34.**
- SF – Carlos Hyde 2-yard run (Robbie Gould kick), 2:32. 49ers 10–3. **Drive: 6 plays, 68 yards, 3:05.**
- HOU – DeAndre Hopkins 7-yard pass from T. J. Yates (kick failed), 0:54. 49ers 10–9. **Drive: 9 plays, 75 yards, 1:38.**
- SF – Robbie Gould 35-yard field goal, 0:02. 49ers 13–9. **Drive: 6 plays, 62 yards, 0:52.**

**Third quarter**

- HOU – DeAndre Hopkins 29-yard pass from T. J. Yates (Kaʻimi Fairbairn kick), 12:11. Texans 16–13. **Drive: 6 plays, 75 yards, 2:49.**
- SF – Robbie Gould 25-yard field goal, 8:15. Tied 16–16. **Drive: 11 plays, 68 yards, 3:59.**
- SF – Garrett Celek 6-yard pass from Jimmy Garoppolo (Robbie Gould kick), 1:53. 49ers 23–16. **Drive: 6 plays, 85 yards, 3:33.**

**Fourth quarter**

- SF – Robbie Gould 41-yard field goal, 3:54. 49ers 26–16. **Drive: 4 plays, 9 yards, 1:46.**

**Top passers**

- SF – Jimmy Garoppolo – 20/33, 334 yards, TD, INT
- HOU – T. J. Yates – 14/26, 175 yards, 2 TD

**Top rushers**

- SF – Carlos Hyde – 14 carries, 78 yards, TD
- HOU – Lamar Miller – 18 carries, 54 yards

**Top receivers**

- SF – Marquise Goodwin – 6 receptions, 106 yards
- HOU – DeAndre Hopkins – 11 receptions, 149 yards, 2 TD

Top Tacklers

- SF –
- HOU –

Tom Savage left the game in the 2nd quarter with a concussion. Savage took a hard hit from Elvis Dumervil and his hands were visibly shaking and had trouble rolling over on his side. After throwing two incomplete passes on the ensuing drive, Savage was further evaluated and taken into the locker room. Savage's return was heavily criticized by fans, media members, and concussion experts, including Chris Nowinski. Savage finished the game 6-of-12 for 63 yards. T. J. Yates came in at quarterback on the Texans' next drive, leading a 9-play, 75-yard touchdown drive, ending with a 7-yard pass to DeAndre Hopkins.

With the loss, the Texans fell to 4–9, ensuring their first losing season under head coach Bill O'Brien. Houston was eliminated from playoff contention the following day after the Miami Dolphins defeated the New England Patriots.

==== Week 15: at Jacksonville Jaguars ====
Week Fifteen: Houston Texans at Jacksonville Jaguars – Game summary

Quarter	1	2	3	4	Total
Texans	0	0	7	0	**7**
**Jaguars**	7	24	7	7	**45**

at EverBank Field, Jacksonville, Florida

- Date: December 17
- Game time: 1:00 p.m. EST/12:00 p.m. CST
- Game weather: 72 °F (22 °C)
- Game attendance: 64,701
- Referee: Carl Cheffers
- TV announcers (Fox): Chris Myers, Daryl Johnston and Laura Okmin
- Recap, Gamebook

Game information

**First quarter**

- JAX – Tommy Bohanon 1-yard run (Josh Lambo kick), 3:54. Jaguars 7–0. **Drive: 13 plays, 78 yards, 6:52.**

**Second quarter**

- JAX – Jaydon Mickens 5-yard pass from Blake Bortles (Josh Lambo kick), 14:51. Jaguars 14–0. **Drive: 5 plays, 59 yards, 1:59.**
- JAX – Jaydon Mickens 14-yard pass from Blake Bortles (Josh Lambo kick), 10:18. Jaguars 21–0. **Drive: 6 plays, 63 yards, 2:59.**
- JAX – Josh Lambo 38-yard field goal, 0:56. Jaguars 24–0. **Drive: 8 plays, 25 yards, 0:56.**
- JAX – Keelan Cole 9-yard pass from Blake Bortles (Josh Lambo kick), 0:30. Jaguars 31–0. **Drive: 2 plays, 45 yards, 0:11.**

**Third quarter**

- HOU – DeAndre Hopkins 25-yard pass from T.J. Yates (Kaʻimi Fairbairn kick), 8:17. Jaguars 31–7. **Drive: 8 plays, 81 yards, 4:30.**
- JAX – Tommy Bohanon 1-yard run (Josh Lambo kick), 7:16. Jaguars 38–7. **Drive: 3 plays, 74 yards, 0:59.**

**Fourth quarter**

- JAX – Corey Grant 8-yard run (Josh Lambo kick), 10:30. Jaguars 45–7. **Drive: 4 plays, 45 yards, 2:07.**

**Top passers**

- HOU – T.J. Yates – 12/31, 128 yards, TD, INT
- JAX – Blake Bortles – 21/29, 326 yards, 3 TD

**Top rushers**

- HOU – Alfred Blue – 12 carries, 55 yards
- JAX – Corey Grant – 10 carries, 69 yards, TD

**Top receivers**

- HOU – DeAndre Hopkins – 4 receptions, 80 yards, TD
- JAX – Keelan Cole – 7 receptions, 186 yards, TD

**Top tacklers**

- HOU – Marcus Gilchrist – 5 tackles, 1 assist
- JAX – Calais Campbell – 5 tackles, 2 sacks

With another blowout loss to the Jaguars, the Texans were swept by Jacksonville for the first time since 2013 and fell to 4–10.

==== Week 16: vs. Pittsburgh Steelers ====
NFL on Christmas Day

Week Sixteen: Pittsburgh Steelers at Houston Texans – Game summary

Quarter	1	2	3	4	Total
**Steelers**	10	10	7	7	**34**
Texans	0	0	0	6	**6**

at NRG Stadium, Houston, Texas

- Date: December 25
- Game time: 3:30 p.m. CST
- Game weather: Played indoors (retractable roof closed)
- Game attendance: 71,842
- Referee: Bill Vinovich
- TV announcers (NBC/NFLN/Amazon Video): Mike Tirico, Kurt Warner and Heather Cox
- Recap, Gamebook

Game information

**First quarter**

- PIT – Chris Boswell 34-yard field goal, 10:40. Steelers 3–0. **Drive: 8 plays, 59 yards, 4:20.**
- PIT – Justin Hunter 5-yard pass from Ben Roethlisberger (Chris Boswell kick), 6:59. Steelers 10–0. **Drive: 6 plays, 54 yards, 2:04.**

**Second quarter**

- PIT – Roosevelt Nix 1-yard run (Chris Boswell kick), 4:14. Steelers 17–0. **Drive: 11 plays, 80 yards, 6:07.**
- PIT – Chris Boswell 36-yard field goal, 0:53. Steelers 20–0. **Drive: 6 plays, 10 yards, 1:52.**

**Third quarter**

- PIT – Le'Veon Bell 10-yard run (Chris Boswell kick), 1:48. Steelers 27–0. **Drive: 7 plays, 42 yards, 3:55.**

**Fourth quarter**

- HOU – DeAndre Hopkins 3-yard pass from T. J. Yates (pass failed), 12:30. Steelers 27–6. **Drive: 7 plays, 75 yards, 4:18.**
- PIT – JuJu Smith-Schuster 18-yard pass from Ben Roethlisberger (Chris Boswell kick), 9:26. Steelers 34–6. **Drive: 5 plays, 79 yards, 3:04.**

**Top passers**

- PIT – Ben Roethlisberger – 20/29, 226 yards, 2 TD
- HOU – T. J. Yates – 7/16, 83 yards, TD, INT

**Top rushers**

- PIT – Le'Veon Bell – 14 carries, 69 yards, TD
- HOU – Alfred Blue – 16 carries, 108 yards

**Top receivers**

- PIT – JuJu Smith-Schuster – 6 receptions, 75 yards, TD
- HOU – DeAndre Hopkins – 4 receptions, 65 yards, TD

**Top tacklers**

- PIT – Sean Spence and Vince Williams – 6 Solo, 2 Assisted
- HOU – Zach Cunningham – 7 Solo, 3 Assisted

==== Week 17: at Indianapolis Colts ====
Week Seventeen: Houston Texans at Indianapolis Colts – Game summary

Quarter	1	2	3	4	Total
Texans	3	10	0	0	**13**
**Colts**	0	7	7	8	**22**

at Lucas Oil Stadium, Indianapolis, Indiana

- Date: December 31
- Game time: 12:00 p.m. CST
- Game weather: Played indoors (retractable roof closed)
- Game attendance: 60,557
- Referee: Gene Steratore
- TV announcers (CBS): Tom McCarthy, Steve Tasker and Steve Beuerlein
- Recap, Gamebook

Game information

**First quarter**

- HOU – Kaʻimi Fairbairn 52-yard field goal, 8:15. Texans 3–0. **Drive: 10 plays, 41 yards, 5:26.**

**Second quarter**

- IND – Jack Doyle 6-yard pass from Jacoby Brissett (Adam Vinatieri kick), 14:55. Colts 7–3. **Drive: 15 plays, 75 yards, 8:20.**
- HOU – Alfred Blue 2-yard run (Kaʻimi Fairbairn kick), 6:55. Texans 10–7. **Drive: 13 plays, 75 yards, 8:00.**
- HOU – Kaʻimi Fairbairn 46-yard field goal, 1:44. Texans 13–7. **Drive: 10 plays, 58 yards, 4:37.**

**Third quarter**

- IND – Marlon Mack 1-yard run (Adam Vinatieri kick), 6:51. Colts 14–13. **Drive: 13 plays, 83 yards, 6:39.**

**Fourth quarter**

- IND – T. J. Yates sacked in end zone by Hassan Ridgeway for a Safety, 12:07. Colts 16–13.
- IND – Adam Vinatieri 54-yard field goal, 8:47. Colts 19–13. **Drive: 7 plays, 20 yards, 3:20.**
- IND – Adam Vinatieri 22-yard field goal, 0:31. Colts 22–13. **Drive: 12 plays, 49 yards, 6:06.**

**Top passers**

- HOU – T. J. Yates – 14/24, 137 yards, INT
- IND – Jacoby Brissett – 15/25, 114 yards, TD

**Top rushers**

- HOU – Alfred Blue – 18 carries, 39 yards, TD
- IND – Frank Gore – 24 carries, 100 yards

**Top receivers**

- HOU – Alfred Blue – 4 receptions, 36 yards
- IND – Jack Doyle – 4 receptions, 38 yards, TD

**Top tacklers**

- HOU – Zach Cunningham – 4 tackles, 7 assists
- IND – Antonio Morrison – 4 tackles, assist

This is the Texans' first loss in the Bill O'Brien era when they had a lead at halftime. They finished 4–12 and via head-to-head tiebreaker finished dead last in the AFC South.

=== Standings ===
==== Division ====
AFC South
	W	L	T	PCT	DIV	CONF	PF	PA	STK
^{(3)} Jacksonville Jaguars	10	6	0	.625	4–2	9–3	417	268	L2
^{(5)} Tennessee Titans	9	7	0	.563	5–1	8–4	334	356	W1
Indianapolis Colts	4	12	0	.250	2–4	3–9	263	404	W1
Houston Texans	4	12	0	.250	1–5	3–9	338	436	L6

==== Conference ====
AFC
#	Team	Division	W	L	T	PCT	DIV	CONF	SOS	SOV	STK
**Division leaders**
1 (Note: New England claimed the No. 1 seed over Pittsburgh based on head-to-head victory.)	New England Patriots	East	13	3	0	.813	5–1	10–2	.484	.466	W3
2	Pittsburgh Steelers	North	13	3	0	.813	6–0	10–2	.453	.423	W2
3 (Note: Jacksonville claimed the No. 3 seed over Kansas City based on conference record.)	Jacksonville Jaguars	South	10	6	0	.625	4–2	9–3	.434	.394	L2
4	Kansas City Chiefs	West	10	6	0	.625	5–1	8–4	.477	.481	W4
**Wild Cards**
5 (Note: Tennessee finished ahead of Buffalo, Baltimore and Los Angeles Chargers based on conference record, claiming the No. 5 seed. Buffalo and Baltimore finished ahead of Los Angeles Chargers based on conference record. Buffalo claimed the No. 6 seed over Baltimore based on strength of victory.)	Tennessee Titans	South	9	7	0	.563	5–1	8–4	.434	.396	W1
6	Buffalo Bills	East	9	7	0	.563	3–3	7–5	.492	.396	W1
**Did not qualify for the postseason**
7	Baltimore Ravens	North	9	7	0	.563	3–3	7–5	.441	.299	L1
8	Los Angeles Chargers	West	9	7	0	.563	3–3	6–6	.457	.347	W2
9	Cincinnati Bengals	North	7	9	0	.438	3–3	6–6	.465	.321	W2
10 (Note: Oakland finished ahead of Miami based on head-to-head victory.)	Oakland Raiders	West	6	10	0	.375	2–4	5–7	.512	.396	L4
11	Miami Dolphins	East	6	10	0	.375	2–4	5–7	.543	.531	L3
12 (Note: Denver finished ahead of the New York Jets based on head-to-head victory.)	Denver Broncos	West	5	11	0	.313	2–4	4–8	.492	.413	L2
13	New York Jets	East	5	11	0	.313	2–4	5–7	.520	.438	L4
14 (Note: Indianapolis finished ahead of Houston based on head-to-head sweep.)	Indianapolis Colts	South	4	12	0	.250	2–4	3–9	.480	.219	W1
15	Houston Texans	South	4	12	0	.250	1–5	3–9	.516	.375	L6
16	Cleveland Browns	North	0	16	0	.000	0–6	0–12	.520	–	L16
**Tiebreakers** (Note: When breaking ties for three or more teams under the NFL's rules, they are first broken within divisions, then comparing only the highest ranked remaining team from each division.)

== Statistics ==
=== Team ===
Category	Total yards	Yards per game	NFL rank (out of 32)
Passing offense	3,278	204.9	21st
Rushing offense	1,842	115.1	14th
Total offense	5,120	320.0	20th
Passing defense	3,799	237.4	24th
Rushing defense	1,747	109.2	13th
Total defense	5,546	346.6	20th

=== Individual ===
Category	Player	Total
Offense
Passing yards	Deshaun Watson	1,699
Passing touchdowns	Deshaun Watson	19
Rushing yards	Lamar Miller	888
Rushing touchdowns	Lamar Miller	3
Receiving yards	DeAndre Hopkins	1,378
Receiving touchdowns	DeAndre Hopkins	13
Defense
Tackles (Solo)	Benardrick McKinney	62
Sacks	Jadeveon Clowney	9.5
Interceptions	Andre Hal	3
