= DeAndre Hopkins =

American football player and coach (born 1992)

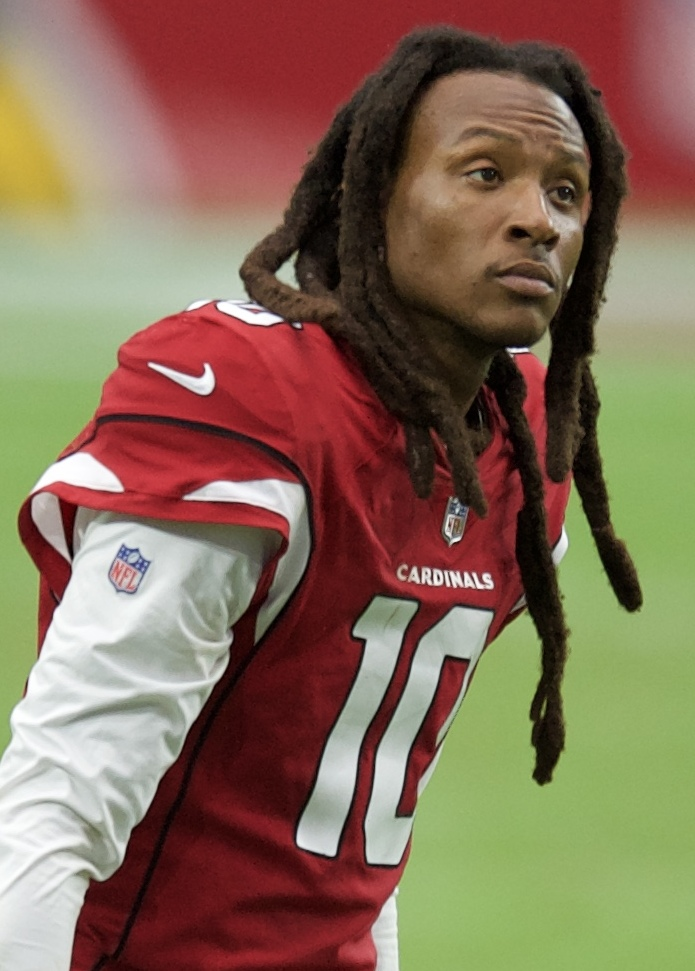
- Hopkins with the Arizona Cardinals in 2020

Georgia Tech Yellow Jackets
- Title: Wide receivers coach

Personal information
- Born: June 6, 1992 (age 34); Clemson, South Carolina, U.S.
- Listed height: 6 ft 1 in (1.85 m)
- Listed weight: 210 lb (95 kg)

Career information
- High school: D. W. Daniel (Central, South Carolina)
- College: Clemson (2010–2012)
- NFL draft: 2013: 1st round, 27th overall pick

Career history

Playing
- Houston Texans (2013–2019); Arizona Cardinals (2020–2022); Tennessee Titans (2023–2024); Kansas City Chiefs (2024); Baltimore Ravens (2025)

Coaching
- Georgia Tech (2026–present); Assistant wide receivers coach (2026); Wide receivers coach (2026–present)

Awards and highlights
- 3× First-team All-Pro (2017–2019); 2× Second-team All-Pro (2015, 2020); 5× Pro Bowl (2015, 2017–2020); NFL receiving touchdowns leader (2017); PFWA All-Rookie Team (2013); Second-team All-American (2012); First-team All-ACC (2012)

Career NFL statistics as of 2025
- Receptions: 1,006
- Receiving yards: 13,295
- Receiving touchdowns: 85
- Stats at Pro Football Reference

DeAndre Rashaun Hopkins (born June 6, 1992), nicknamed "DHop" and "Nuk", is an American football coach and a professional wide receiver who is currently the wide receivers coach for the Georgia Tech Yellow Jackets.

He played college football for the Clemson Tigers and was selected by the Houston Texans in the first round of the 2013 NFL draft. He has also played in the NFL for the Arizona Cardinals, Tennessee Titans, Kansas City Chiefs, and Baltimore Ravens. Hopkins is a five-time Pro Bowler and has been named to five All-Pro teams.

== Early life ==
As an infant, Hopkins was given the nickname Nuk by his mother because he frequently chewed through NUK pacifiers. It is pronounced "nuke" (although the pacifier brand is pronounced "nook").

Hopkins attended D. W. Daniel High School in Central, South Carolina, where he played football, basketball, and ran track and field for the Lions athletic teams. During his high school football career, Hopkins had 57 receptions for 1,266 yards and 18 touchdowns on offense and 28 interceptions and five touchdowns on defense. While on the basketball team, he played as a shooting guard and point guard, scoring 1,453 career points. His senior season, 2009–10, the Lions won their third South Carolina State Championship, and Hopkins was named the Independent Mail's player of the year. He was rated as the 12th best wide receiver in the nation and the State of South Carolina. He received various rankings by reputable sports organizations, ESPN ranked him the 29th best athlete. He earned an All-State first-team from the state and The Charlotte Observer.

== College career ==
Hopkins enrolled in Clemson University, where he played for the Clemson Tigers football team from 2010 to 2012 under head coach Dabo Swinney.

=== 2010 season ===
Hopkins immediately became a contributor to the Clemson offense as a freshman in their 6–7 season. Hopkins started his collegiate career with two receptions for 23 receiving yards in a 35–10 victory over North Texas on September 24. The next week, against Presbyterian, he scored his first collegiate receiving touchdown on a nine-yard reception from Tajh Boyd in the 58–21 victory. On November 13, in a road 16–13 loss to Florida State, he had eight receptions for 106 receiving yards. In the final game of the regular season, the Palmetto Bowl against rival South Carolina, he had seven receptions for 124 receiving yards and a receiving touchdown in the 29–7 loss. In the 2010 Meineke Car Care Bowl against South Florida, he had nine receptions for 105 receiving yards in the 31–26 loss to close out his freshman season. Hopkins was Clemson's leading receiver with 52 receptions for 637 receiving yards and four receiving touchdowns. In addition, he played basketball after his freshman season. He played in seven games in the 2010–11 season for the Tigers basketball team.

=== 2011 season ===
Clemson took a major step forward in Hopkins's sophomore year, finishing with a 10–4 mark. Hopkins started the 2011 season with nine receptions for 108 receiving yards and a receiving touchdown in two games combined against Troy and Wofford. Against Auburn on September 17, Hopkins had seven receptions for 83 receiving yards and a receiving touchdown in the 38–24 victory. On October 22, against North Carolina, he had nine receptions for 157 receiving yards and a receiving touchdown in the 59–38 victory. Nearly a month later, against NC State, he had five receptions for 124 receiving yards in the 37–13 loss. In the ACC Championship against Virginia Tech, he had seven receptions for 92 receiving yards in the 38–10 victory. In the 2012 Orange Bowl, he had 10 receptions for 107 receiving yards and a receiving touchdown in the historic 70–33 loss to West Virginia. As a sophomore in 2011, he had 72 receptions for 978 receiving yards and five receiving touchdowns. He finished second on the team in the major receiving categories to Sammy Watkins.

=== 2012 season ===
In his junior year, Hopkins helped lead the Tigers to their first 11-win season since 1981. Hopkins started the 2012 season off strong with 13 receptions for 119 receiving yards and a receiving touchdown in a 26–19 win over Auburn in the Chick-fil-A Kickoff Game. With Clemson trailing in the fourth quarter, Hopkins had the go-ahead score. One week later, against Ball State, he had six receptions for 105 receiving yards and three receiving touchdowns in a 52–27 victory. Hopkins three touchdowns all came in the second quarter, setting a new school record for touchdowns in a quarter. Dating back to the prior season, this gave Hopkins three consecutive games with 100 receiving yards, tying a school record. On September 29, against Boston College, had had 11 receptions for 197 receiving yards and a receiving touchdown in the 45–31 victory. In the following game, he had seven receptions for 173 receiving yards and two receiving touchdowns against Georgia Tech in a 47–31 victory. On November 3, in a game at Duke, he had four receptions for 128 receiving yards and three receiving touchdowns in the 56–20 victory. Like his previous three-touchdown game against Ball State, Hopkins recorded all three touchdowns in one quarter, with this performance being the first quarter. He closed out the regular season with one receiving touchdown in each of the last three games against Maryland, North Carolina State, and South Carolina. In the 2012 Chick-fil-A Bowl against LSU, he had 13 receptions for 191 receiving yards and two receiving touchdowns in the 25–24 victory. Hopkins's touchdown came with under three minutes remaining to put Clemson down 2. Clemson eventually won the game on 37-yard field goal from Chandler Catanzaro. In his junior season in 2012, Hopkins had one of the best receiving seasons in ACC history, with a conference-best 1,405 yards on 82 catches and a school-record 18 touchdowns earning First-team All-Conference honors. Hopkins, along with junior quarterback Tajh Boyd and wide receiver Sammy Watkins, combined to make one of the most prolific passing offenses in college football and broke many individual and career school records. He scored a touchdown in each of the last ten games of the season, doubling the previous school record for consecutive games with a score. Hopkins left Clemson with career record for receiving yards (3,020) and career touchdown receptions (27). His 206 career receptions were the most by a Clemson receiver since Aaron Kelly had 232 from 2005 to 2008. On January 10, 2013, Hopkins decided to forgo his senior season at Clemson and enter the NFL Draft.

== Professional career ==
=== Pre-draft ===
Coming out of Clemson, Hopkins was considered a top prospect and received an invitation to the NFL Combine. He completed nearly all of the combine drills, but was unable to finish the three-cone drill after suffering an apparent calf injury. After the combine, the hotel room Hopkins shared with Rutgers wide receiver Mark Harrison was found to be left in a state where "urine and feces were found around the bathroom, toothpaste was left on the mirror and partially eaten food was on one of the beds," per ESPN. Both players denied responsibility.

On March 7, 2013, he participated in Clemson's pro day. Hopkins attended private workouts or visits with the Dallas Cowboys, Carolina Panthers, New England Patriots, and had two with the St. Louis Rams.

At the conclusion of the predraft process, Hopkins was projected to be a first or second round pick by NFL draft experts and scouts. He was ranked as the third best wide receiver prospect by NFL.com draft analyst Josh Norris, the fourth best wide receiver by Sports Illustrated, and was ranked the fifth best wide receiver by NFLDraftScout.com and NFL analyst Mike Mayock.

Pre-draft measurables
Height	Weight	Arm length	Hand span	Wingspan	40-yard dash	10-yard split	20-yard split	20-yard shuttle	Three-cone drill	Vertical jump	Broad jump	Bench press
6 ft 1 in (1.85 m)	214 lb (97 kg)	33 3/8 in (0.85 m)	10 in (0.25 m)	6 ft 8 in (2.03 m)	4.57 s	1.62 s	2.69 s	4.50 s	6.83 s	36 in (0.91 m)	9 ft 7 in (2.92 m)	15 reps
All results from NFL Combine/Clemson's Pro Day

=== Houston Texans ===
==== 2013 season ====
The Houston Texans selected Hopkins in the first round with the 27th overall pick in the 2013 NFL draft. He was the second wide receiver selected, behind Tavon Austin (Rams, eighth overall). Hopkins was the second wide receiver in franchise history to be drafted in the first round, the first being Andre Johnson who was selected third overall in 2003. It was also just the second time in 10 years that the Texans selected an offensive player (the other selection was left tackle Duane Brown) in the first round. He became the highest wide receiver out of Clemson since Rod Gardner went 15th overall in 2001. On July 24, 2013, Hopkins signed a four-year, $7.62 million contract with the team. The first three years of the contract were fully guaranteed.

Hopkins made his NFL debut in the season opener against the San Diego Chargers and made five receptions for 55 yards in the 31–28 victory, a game where the Texans at one point trailed 28–7. His first NFL reception came on a pass from Matt Schaub for no gain in the second quarter. On September 15, Hopkins caught a season-high seven passes for 117 receiving yards and scored his first career touchdown reception on a three-yard pass from quarterback Matt Schaub in the Texans' 30–24 overtime victory against the Tennessee Titans. It was Hopkins's first game with over one hundred receiving yards. Hopkins was named the NFL Rookie of the Month for September. In Week 7, he caught three passes for 76 yards and scored a touchdown on a 29-yard pass from Case Keenum during a 16–17 loss to Kansas City Chiefs. On December 2, 2013, Head coach Gary Kubiak was fired after the Texans posted a 2–11 record. Hopkins finished the 2013 season with 52 receptions for 802 receiving yards and two touchdowns. His rookie season was marred by inconsistent quarterback play by Matt Schaub that led to Schaub's benching after nine interceptions in five games. Hopkins was named to the NFL All-Rookie Team for the 2013 season.

==== 2014 season ====
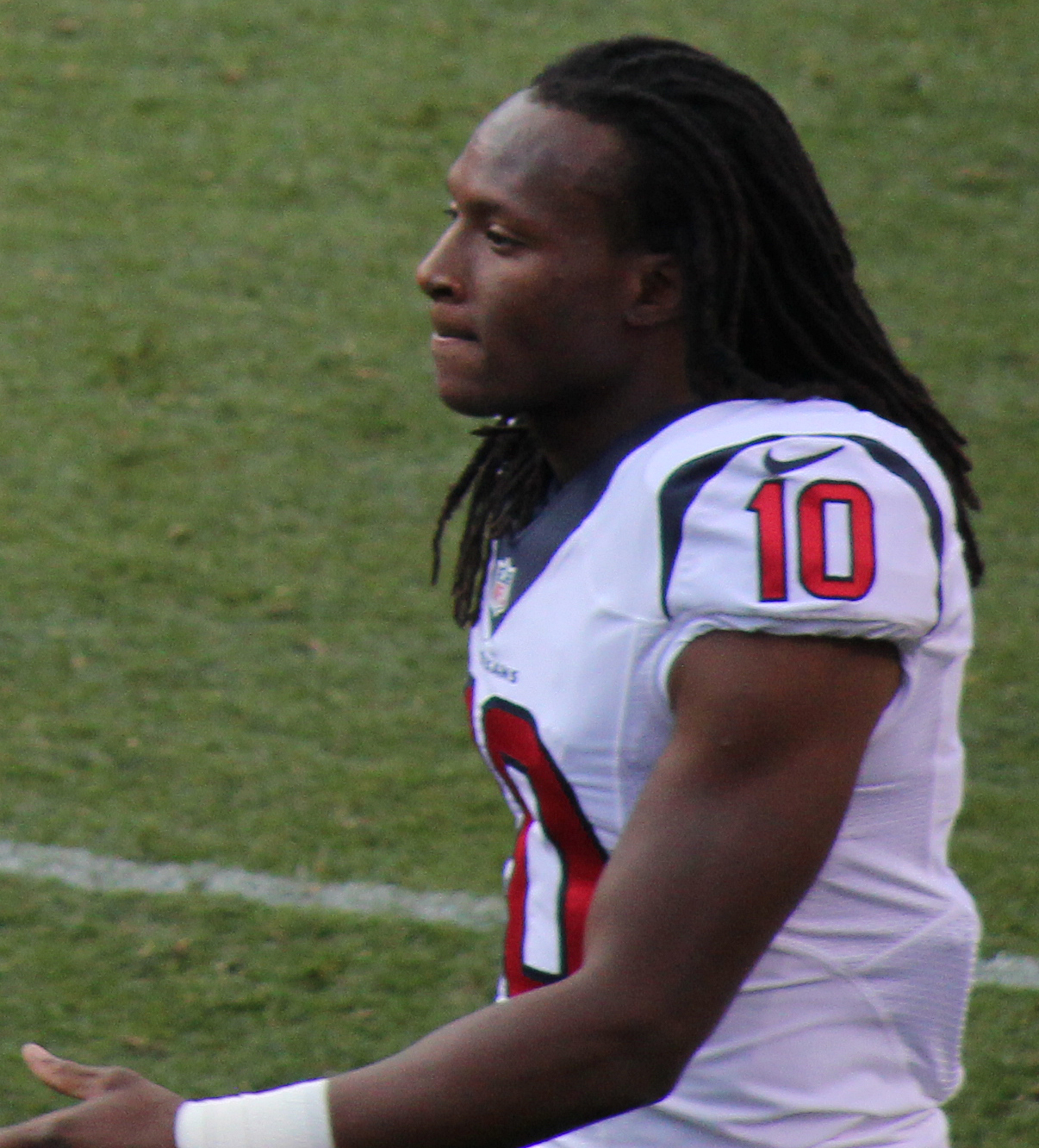
Hopkins with the Texans in 2014

Hopkins returned as a starting wide receiver alongside Andre Johnson under new head coach Bill O'Brien to begin the 2014 season.

Hopkins started in the season-opening 17–6 victory over the Washington Redskins and caught four passes for 89 yards and scored a new career-long 76-yard touchdown on a pass by quarterback Ryan Fitzpatrick. In Week 3, he had six receptions for 116 yards during a 30–14 victory over the New York Giants. In the game, Hopkins had a spectacular one-handed 53-yard catch that was negated by an illegal formation penalty. During a Week 7 matchup against the Pittsburgh Steelers, Hopkins made six receptions for 108 receiving yards in a 23–30 loss. On November 30, 2014, Hopkins caught a season-high nine passes for a season-high 238 receiving yards and two touchdowns as the Texans routed the Titans 45–21 in Week 13. Hopkins was the Texans' leading receiver in 2014, recording 76 receptions for 1,210 yards and six touchdowns in 16 games and 16 starts.

==== 2015 season ====
Hopkins was solidified as the Texans' number one receiver to begin the 2015 season after veteran Andre Johnson departed to the Indianapolis Colts in free agency.

Hopkins started in the Texans' season-opener against the Chiefs and caught nine passes for 98 yards and two touchdowns as the Texans lost 27–20. Two weeks later, he recorded his first 100-yard receiving game of the season, with eight receptions for 101 yards and a touchdown in a 19–9 victory over the Tampa Bay Buccaneers. Hopkins increased his production the following week, recording nine receptions for 157 yards in a 48–21 loss to the Atlanta Falcons. During Week 6 against the Jacksonville Jaguars he had 10 receptions for 142 yards and two touchdowns to earn his first career AFC Offensive Player of the Week award. During Week 13 against the Buffalo Bills, Hopkins broke the Texans' franchise record for most touchdown receptions in a season, which was formerly held by Andre Johnson, with his tenth score. In the 2015 season, his usage increased to 192 targets, which ranked third among NFL wide receivers, trailing only Antonio Brown of the Steelers and Julio Jones of the Falcons.

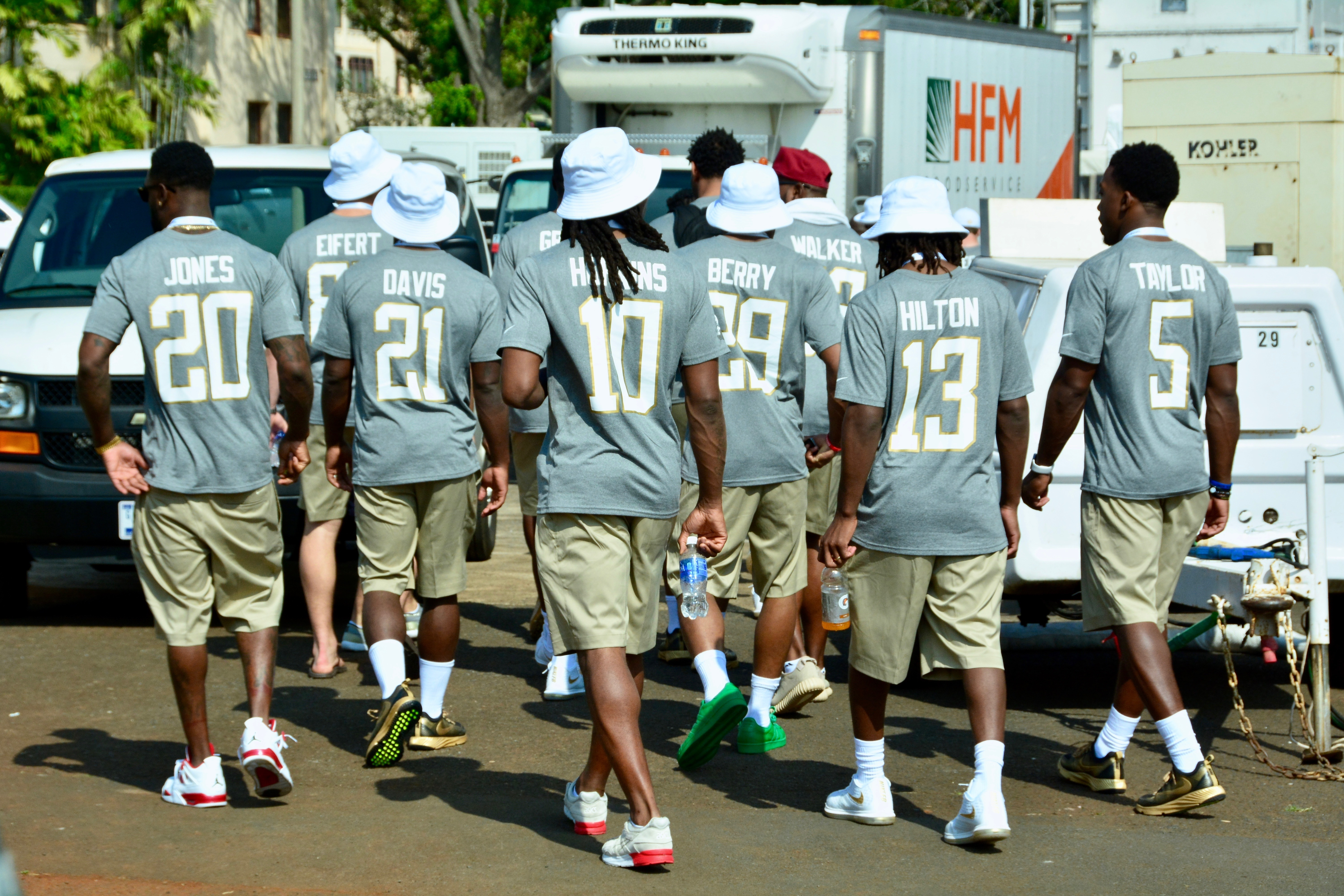
Hopkins (#10) at the 2016 Pro Bowl

Hopkins finished the 2015 season with then-career highs in receptions (111), receiving yards (1,521), and touchdowns (11), despite playing with four different quarterbacks (Brian Hoyer, Ryan Mallett, T. J. Yates, and Brandon Weeden). He earned his first career Pro Bowl nomination and was named second-team All-Pro. He was also ranked 19th by his fellow players on the NFL Top 100 Players of 2016.

==== 2016 season ====
On July 30, 2016, Hopkins did not report to training camp after he announced he was holding out for a new contract.

On September 15, 2016, Hopkins was fined $6,076 for an equipment violation regarding improper cleats on his shoes. The cleats were revealed to be Yeezy 350 Boosts cleats designed by Kanye West. In the 2016 season, Hopkins suffered through some small regression as the quarterback play of Brock Osweiler lacked positive consistency. The Texans finished atop the AFC South with a 9–7 record. In the Wild Card Round, against the Oakland Raiders, Hopkins had five receptions for 67 yards and a touchdown in the 27–14 victory. The Texans went on to lose in the Divisional Round of the 2016–17 NFL playoffs to the eventual Super Bowl champion Patriots. Hopkins had six receptions for 65 yards in the 34–16 loss.

Hopkins had 78 receptions for 954 yards and four touchdowns in the 2016 season, all his lowest totals since his rookie season in 2013.

==== 2017 season ====
On August 31, 2017, the Houston Texans signed Hopkins to a five-year, $81 million contract extension with $49 million guaranteed and a signing bonus of $7.5 million.

During the season-opening 29–7 loss to the Jaguars, Hopkins caught the first NFL touchdown pass of quarterback and fellow Clemson Tiger Deshaun Watson's career. He finished with seven receptions for 55 yards and a touchdown. During Week 8 against the Seattle Seahawks, Hopkins posted an impressive performance with eight receptions for 224 receiving yards, which was highlighted by a 72-yard touchdown. However, his performance was overshadowed as the Texans lost on the road by a score of 38–41. On December 19, 2017, Hopkins was named to his second Pro Bowl. Hopkins did not play in Week 17 due to a calf injury.

Hopkins finished the 2017 season with 96 receptions for 1,378 yards and a league-leading 13 touchdowns. He led the league in scoring among wide receivers with 78 points. He became the first player in franchise history to lead the league in receiving touchdowns for a single season. He was named as a First-team All-Pro for the 2017 season and was ranked 13th by his fellow players on the NFL Top 100 Players of 2018.

==== 2018 season ====
During Week 2, Hopkins had six catches for 110 yards and a touchdown in a 20–17 road loss against the Titans. During Week 4 against the Colts, he had 10 receptions for 169 yards and a touchdown in the 37–34 overtime victory. In the following game, on Sunday Night Football against the Cowboys, he had nine receptions for 151 yards, which included a key 49 yard catch-and-run in overtime to help set up the game-winning field goal.

Hopkins finished the 2018 season with a career-high 115 catches for a career-high 1,572 receiving yards and 11 touchdowns. He finished third in the league in receptions and second in receiving yards. He was named to his third Pro Bowl and his second straight First-team All-Pro. The Texans won the AFC South win an 11–5 record and earned the #3-seed for the AFC Playoffs. In the Wild Card Round against the Colts, playing with a torn ligament in his shoulder, he finished with five receptions for 37 yards in the 21–7 loss. He was ranked 11th by his fellow players on the NFL Top 100 Players of 2019.

==== 2019 season ====
In the season-opener against the New Orleans Saints, Hopkins had eight receptions for 111 receiving yards and two receiving touchdowns in the narrow 30–28 road loss. Three weeks later against the Panthers, he caught five passes for 41 receiving yards and threw an interception in a 16–10 loss. During Week 7 against the Colts, Hopkins caught nine passes for 106 receiving yards and a receiving touchdown in the 30–23 road loss. In the next game against the Raiders, Hopkins caught a season-high 11 passes for 109 receiving yards in the 27–24 victory. During Week 12 against the Colts, Hopkins caught six catches for 94 receiving yards and two receiving touchdowns in the 20–17 win. In the next game against the Patriots, he caught five passes for 64 receiving yards and threw a six-yard touchdown pass to quarterback Deshaun Watson during the 28–22 win. In the following week's game against the Denver Broncos, Hopkins caught seven passes for 120 receiving yards and a receiving touchdown during the 38–24 loss. During Week 15 against the Titans, he had six receptions for 119 receiving yards in the 24–21 road victory. Hopkins did not play in Week 17 due to an illness.

Hopkins finished the 2019 season with 104 receptions for 1,165 receiving yards and seven receiving touchdowns. He was ranked 8th by his fellow players on the NFL Top 100 Players of 2020.

The Texans finished atop the AFC South with a 10–6 record and qualified for the playoffs. In the Wild Card Round against the Bills, Hopkins recorded six receptions for 90 receiving yards and a crucial two-point conversion in a 22–19 overtime victory. The two-point conversion put the Texans up 19–16 in regulation. On the Texans' final drive in overtime, Hopkins had a key first down early to set in motion the eventual game-winning field goal. In the Divisional Round against the Chiefs, he caught nine passes for 118 receiving yards during the 51–31 road loss.

=== Arizona Cardinals ===
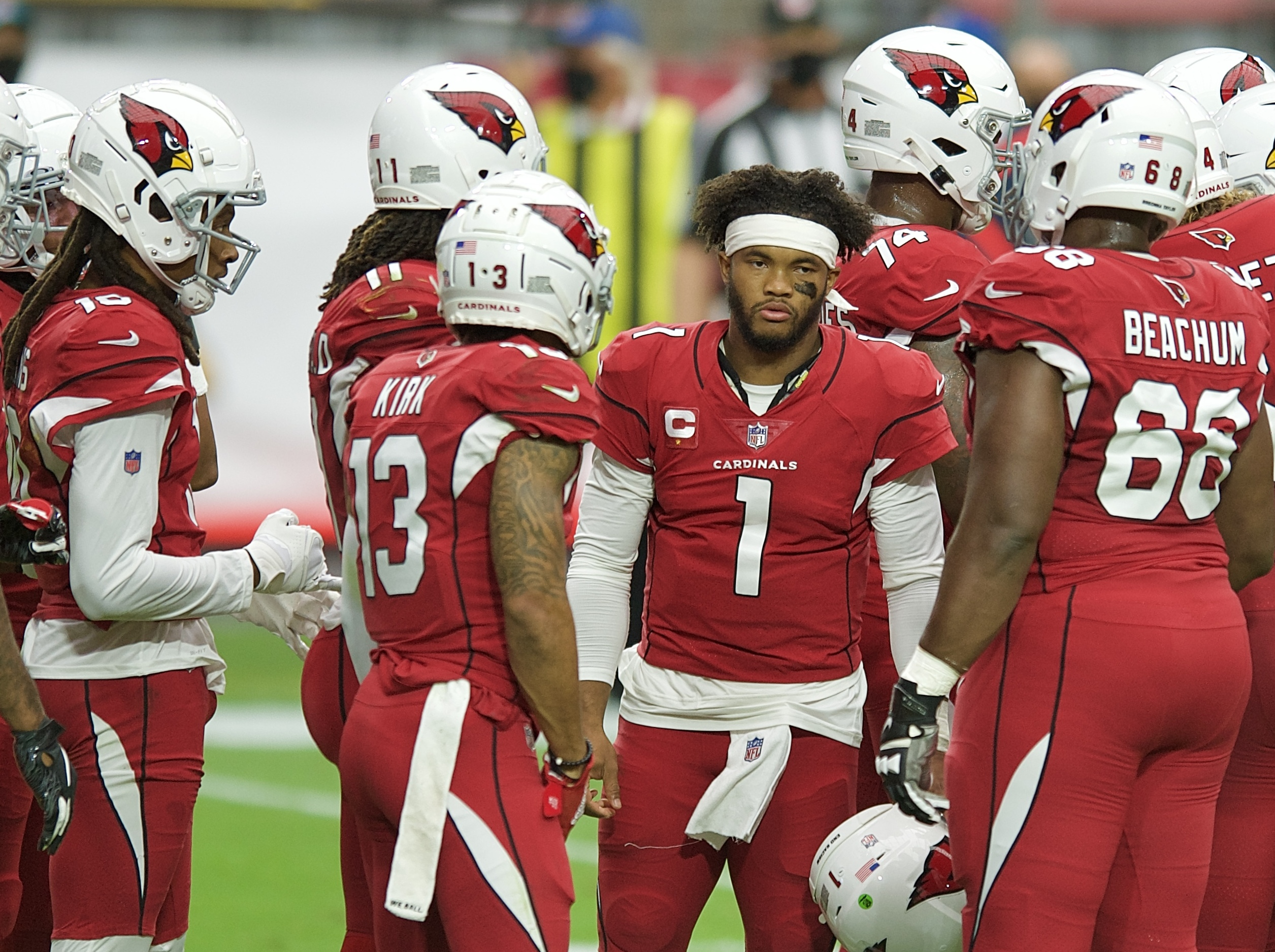
Hopkins (left) with the Cardinals in 2020

==== 2020 season ====
On March 16, 2020, the Texans traded Hopkins and a fourth-round pick in the 2020 NFL draft to the Arizona Cardinals for running back David Johnson, a 2020 second-round pick, and a 2021 fourth-round pick. Reception to the trade was highly critical of the Texans, as well as the head coach at the time, Bill O'Brien, with many sportswriters calling it one of the worst of all time from their perspective, while simultaneously praising the Cardinals for "robbing" the Texans.

On September 8, 2020, Hopkins signed a two-year, $54.5 million contract extension with the Cardinals.

On September 13, 2020, Hopkins made his debut as a Cardinal against the San Francisco 49ers, recording a career-high 14 receptions for 151 yards in the 24–20 win. In Week 2 against the Washington Football Team, Hopkins caught eight passes for 68 yards and his first receiving touchdown as a Cardinal during the 30–15 win. In Week 3, he recorded ten receptions for 137 receiving yards in the 26–23 loss to the Detroit Lions. In Week 5 against the New York Jets, Hopkins recorded six catches for 131 yards, including a 37-yard touchdown reception, during the 30–10 win. In Week 7 against the Seahawks on Sunday Night Football, Hopkins recorded 10 catches for 103 yards and a touchdown during the 37–34 overtime win. In Week 10 against the Bills, Hopkins recorded seven receptions for 127 yards and the game winning touchdown on a 43-yard Hail Mary pass thrown by Kyler Murray with one second left in the 32–30 win which would later be referred to as Hail Murray. Hopkins leaped over three defenders to catch the touchdown. Hopkins was named the NFC Offensive Player of the Week for his performance.

On November 19, Hopkins became the youngest player to reach 700 catches, a record that was held by his teammate, Larry Fitzgerald, during the 28–21 loss to Seattle. In Week 14 against the Giants, Hopkins recorded nine receptions for 136 yards during the 26–7 victory. In Week 15 against the Philadelphia Eagles, Hopkins recorded nine catches for 169 yards and a touchdown during the 33–26 win. In Week 17, against the Los Angeles Rams, Hopkins went over 10,000 receiving yards for his career. He became the youngest player in NFL history to eclipse the mark. Overall, Hopkins finished the season with 115 receptions for 1,407 receiving yards and six receiving touchdowns. His 115 receptions set a new franchise mark for a single season, breaking Fitzgerald's marks in 2015 and 2017. He was ranked 8th by his fellow players on the NFL Top 100 Players of 2021 and was named to his fifth Pro Bowl.

==== 2021 season ====
In a Week 1 matchup against the Titans, Hopkins had six receptions for 83 yards and two touchdowns in the 38–13 rout. On October 24, a Week 7 game against his former team the Texans, Hopkins caught seven passes for 53 yards and a touchdown in the 31–5 win for the eighth straight defeat and a perfect 7–0 record. After the Thursday Night Football loss to the Green Bay Packers, 24–21, Hopkins missed the next three weeks with a hamstring injury. In Week 14, he suffered a torn MCL and was placed on injured reserve on December 18. He finished the season with 42 catches for 572 yards and eight touchdowns in 10 games. He was ranked 37th by his fellow players on the NFL Top 100 Players of 2022.

==== 2022 season ====
On May 2, 2022, the NFL announced that Hopkins would be suspended for the first six games of the season for a violation of the league's performance-enhancing drugs policy. Hopkins returned in Week 7 and had ten receptions for 103 yards in the 42–34 victory over the Saints. In Week 8, he had 12 receptions for 159 yards and one touchdown in the 34–26 loss to the Minnesota Vikings. Hopkins appeared in nine games in the 2022 season. He finished with 64 receptions for 717 receiving yards and three receiving touchdowns.

On May 26, 2023, Hopkins was released by the Cardinals.

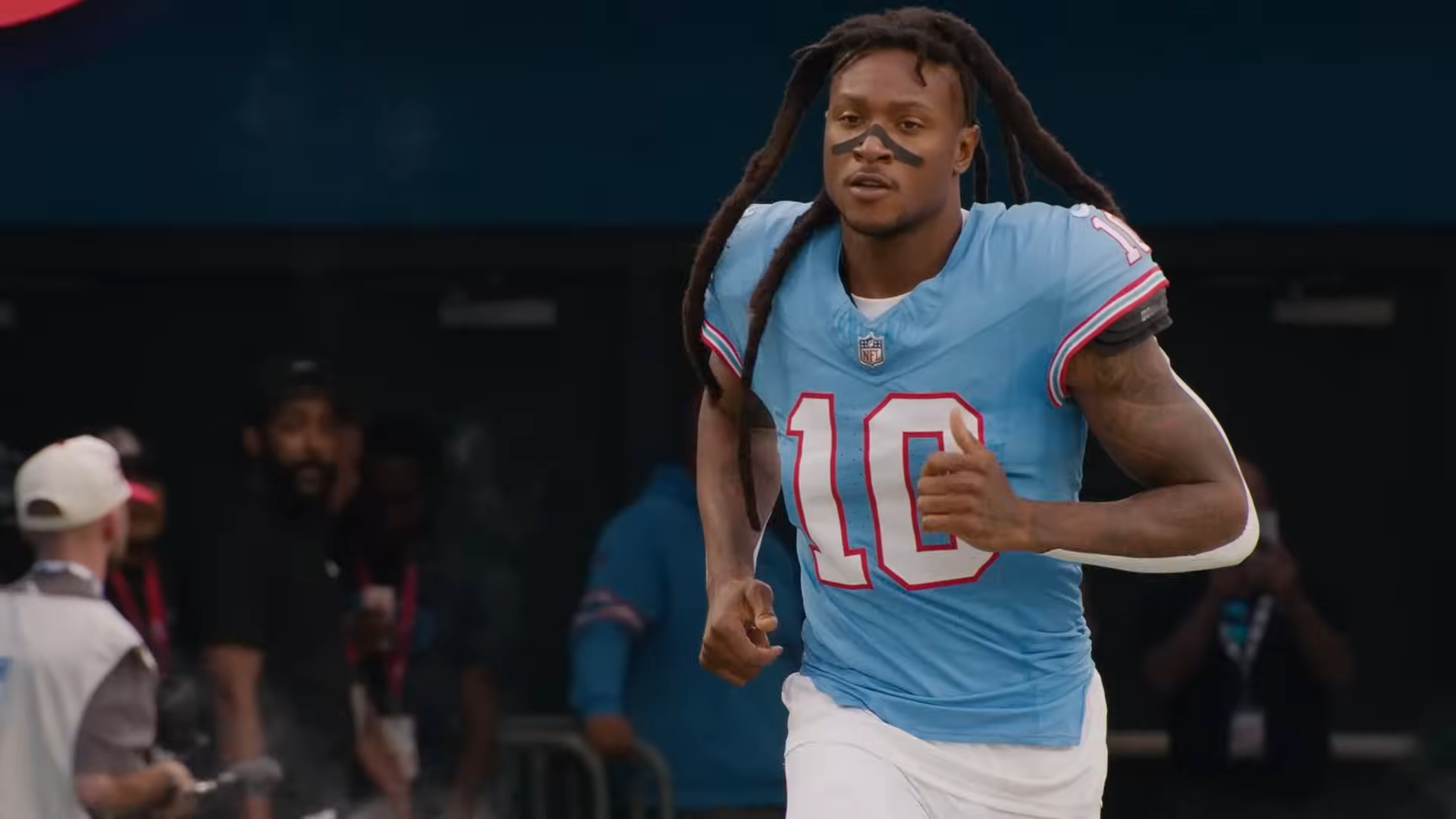
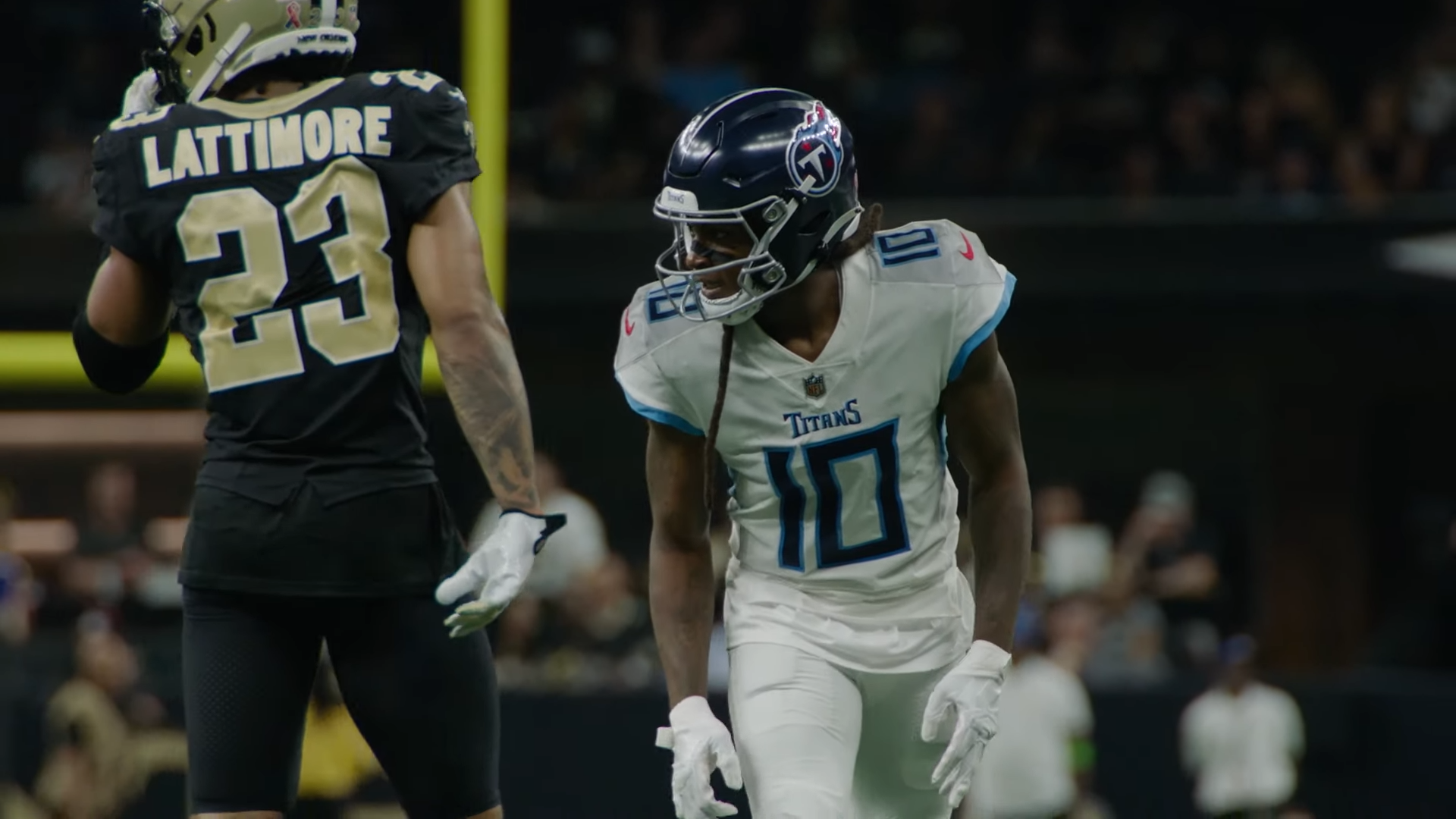
Hopkins playing for the Titans in 2023.

=== Tennessee Titans ===
Hopkins signed a two-year contract with the Titans on July 24, 2023.

In Week 5 of the 2023 season, Hopkins had eight receptions for 140 yards in a loss to the Colts. In the Week 8 win over the Atlanta Falcons, Hopkins caught his first touchdowns with the team from rookie quarterback, Will Levis, with Hopkins finishing with three receiving touchdowns (the first three-touchdown performance from a single Titans receiver since 2010) and 128 receiving yards. In Week 14, a victory over the Dolphins, he had seven receptions for 124 yards and a touchdown. He finished the 2023 season with 75 receptions for 1,057 receiving yards and seven receiving touchdowns.

Hopkins played in six games for the Titans in 2024, catching 15 passes for 173 yards and a touchdown.

=== Kansas City Chiefs ===
On October 24, 2024, the Titans traded Hopkins to the Kansas City Chiefs for a 2025 conditional fifth-round pick that would have become a fourth-round pick if Kansas City were to advance to Super Bowl LIX and Hopkins were to play in 60% of the snaps, but he played in less than 50% of the snaps.

Three days after being traded, Hopkins made his Chiefs debut on October 27 against the Las Vegas Raiders, catching two passes for 29 yards. In his second game, Hopkins finished with 86 yards and scored two touchdowns in an overtime win over the Tampa Bay Buccaneers. In the 2024 season, Hopkins finished with 56 receptions for 610 yards and five touchdowns. He reached the Super Bowl for the first time in his career, scoring a touchdown and a two-point conversion in the 40–22 loss to the Philadelphia Eagles. He became the second wide receiver in Super Bowl history to have a receiving touchdown and a two-point conversion in one game.

=== Baltimore Ravens ===
On March 13, 2025, Hopkins signed a one-year, $5 million contract with the Baltimore Ravens. In his first two games with the Ravens, Hopkins scored a touchdown. He finished the 2025 season with 22 receptions for 330 yards and two touchdowns.

== Career statistics ==
=== NFL ===
Legend
	Led the league
**Bold**	Career high

==== Regular season ====
Year	Team	Games		Receiving					Rushing					Fumbles	
Year	Team	GP	GS	Rec	Yds	Avg	Lng	TD	Att	Yds	Avg	Lng	TD	Fum	Lost
2013	HOU	16	16	52	802	15.4	66	2	—	—	—	—	—	1	1
2014	HOU	16	16	76	1,210	**15.9**	**76**	6	—	—	—	—	—	2	1
2015	HOU	16	16	111	1,521	13.7	61	11	—	—	—	—	—	1	0
2016	HOU	16	16	78	954	12.2	51	4	—	—	—	—	—	0	0
2017	HOU	15	15	96	1,378	14.4	72	**13**	—	—	—	—	—	1	1
2018	HOU	16	16	**115**	**1,572**	13.7	49	11	1	−7	−7.0	0	0	2	**2**
2019	HOU	15	15	104	1,165	11.2	43	7	**2**	**18**	**9.0**	**12**	0	0	0
2020	ARI	16	16	**115**	1,407	12.2	60	6	1	1	1.0	1	0	**3**	**2**
2021	ARI	10	10	42	572	13.6	55	8	—	—	—	—	—	0	0
2022	ARI	9	9	64	717	11.2	33	3	—	—	—	—	—	2	1
2023	TEN	17	16	75	1,057	14.1	61	7	**2**	9	4.5	5	0	0	0
2024	TEN	6	3	15	173	11.5	23	1	—	—	—	—	—	1	0
2024	KC	10	5	41	437	10.7	35	4	—	—	—	—	—	0	0
2025	BAL	17	3	22	330	15.0	41	2	—	—	—	—	—	0	0
Career		195	172	1,006	13,295	13.2	76	85	6	21	3.5	12	0	13	8

==== Postseason ====
Year	Team	Games		Receiving					Fumbles	
Year	Team	GP	GS	Rec	Yds	Avg	Lng	TD	Fum	Lost
2015	HOU	1	1	6	69	11.5	17	0	0	0
2016	HOU	2	2	11	132	12.0	38	**1**	0	0
2018	HOU	1	1	5	37	7.4	13	0	0	0
2019	HOU	2	2	**15**	**208**	**13.9**	**41**	0	**2**	**1**
2021	ARI	Did not play due to injury								
2024	KC	3	2	3	29	9.7	11	**1**	0	0
Career		9	8	40	475	11.9	41	2	2	1

=== College ===
Season	Team	GP	Rec	Yds	TD
2010	Clemson	12	52	637	4
2011	Clemson	14	72	978	5
2012	Clemson	13	82	1,405	18
Total		39	206	3,020	27

== Career highlights ==
=== Awards and honors ===
- 3× First-team All-Pro (2017–2019)
- 2× Second-team All-Pro (2015, 2020)
- 5× Pro Bowl (2015, 2017–2020)
- NFL receiving touchdowns leader (2017)
- PFWA All-Rookie Team (2013)
- NFL Moment of the Year (2020)
- 8× NFL Top 100 — 19th (2016), 13th (2018), 11th (2019), 8th (2020), 8th (2021), 37th (2022), 90th (2023), 87th (2024)
- Second-team All-American (2012)
- First-team All-ACC (2012)

=== Houston Texans franchise records ===
- Receiving yards in a single postseason: 208 (2019)
- Receptions in a season: 115 (2018)
- Receiving touchdowns in a season: 13 (2017)

== Coaching career ==
Hopkins shadowed the New England Patriots coaching staff from July 26 to 30, 2026. Patriots head coach Mike Vrabel, whom Hopkins played for in Tennessee, explained he wanted to "check things out as far as what he wants to do, as far as coaching." As part of his stint, Hopkins mainly worked with the personnel department.

On July 31, 2026, he was hired by Georgia Tech as an assistant wide receivers coach. On November 9, he became the primary wide receivers coach after Jafar Williams' firing.

== Personal life ==
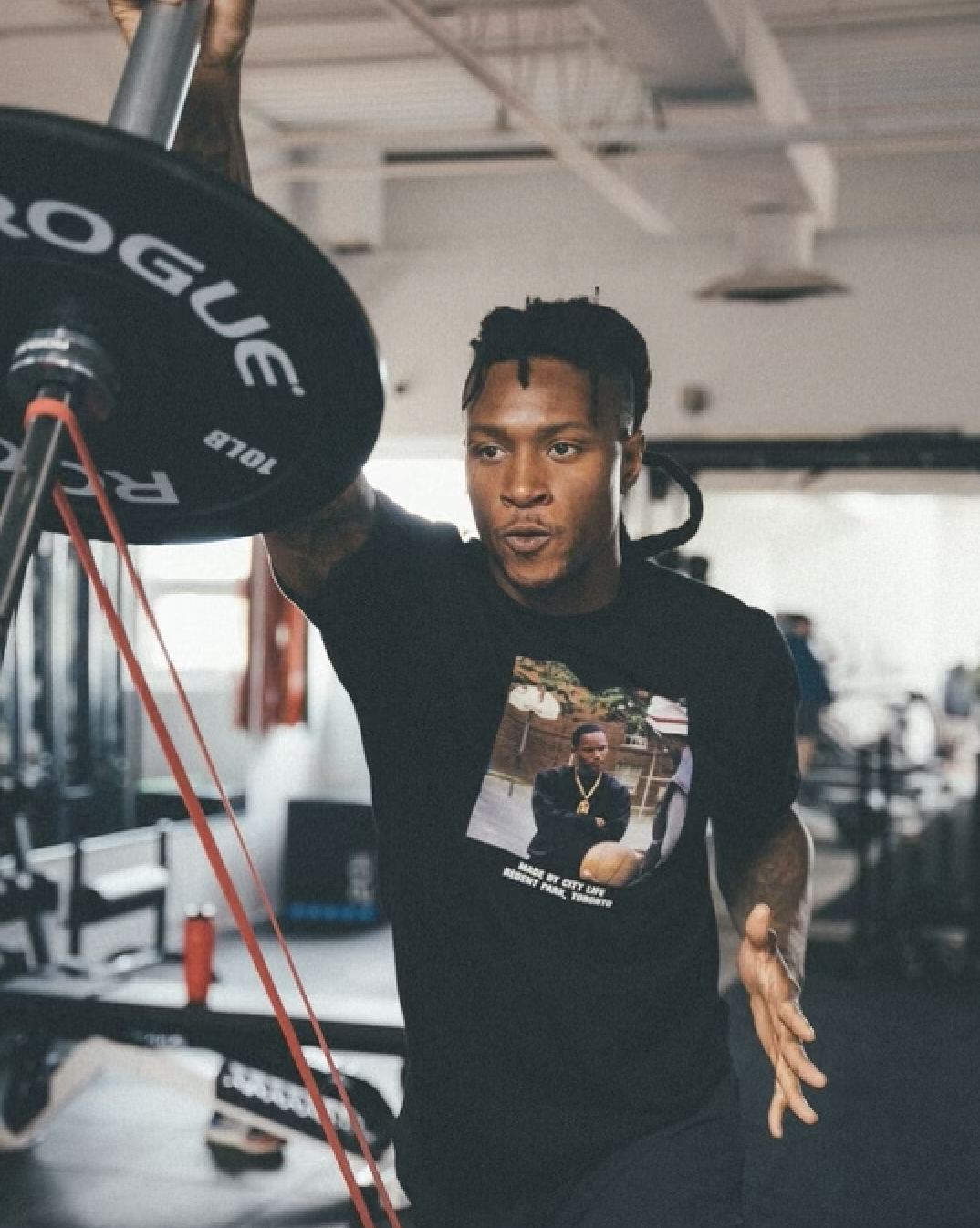
Hopkins at the gym

Hopkins' father died in a car accident when Hopkins was five months old, leaving his mother to raise him and his three siblings as a single mother. Hopkins credits his success to his mother, Sabrina Greenlee. In July 2002, Greenlee had a boiling concoction of lye and bleach thrown at her face by a woman her boyfriend had an affair with. The attack resulted in the skin rapidly peeling off her neck, face, and back and left her blind. Because of her inability to watch him play due to blindness, Hopkins started a tradition of giving touchdown balls to her immediately after scoring in an effort to remain close to her.

Hopkins' uncle on his mother's side, Terry Smith, played wide receiver at Clemson and went undrafted before having a brief professional career.

Hopkins is a Christian. He grew up going to church with his mother and was baptized one day after practice at Clemson in 2012. Hopkins has said, "My faith is a big, big thing for me. It is a major part of my life."

"No matter how hard life can get, you can never give up. Just work hard, live right, and have faith in the Lord."

During his time at Clemson, Hopkins majored in community recreation and sport & camp management. Hopkins holds a SMOOOTH Back-to-school giveaway that supplies book bags and school supplies for over 2,500 children. SMOOOTH is an acronym that stands for "Speaking Mentally Outwardly Opening Opportunities Towards Healing". In 2021, Hopkins went into the cereal business with "DeAndre's Hop Box". A portion of the proceeds of the cereal's sales went to the SMOOOTH Foundation.

In March 2020, Hopkins partnered with Beyond Meat. The partnership started the Feed A Million+ pledge with the intent to donate and distribute more than one million Beyond Burgers across the United States to needy people.

In 2020, Hopkins displayed the name of Denmark Vesey on his helmet as a tribute to the alleged mastermind of a thwarted 1822 South Carolina slave revolt. Hopkins chose Vesey due to their South Carolina heritage, to honor Vesey's sacrifice for equality, and to draw attention to a history that is not commonly taught.
