= 2007 Houston Texans season =

6th season in franchise history

- Owner: Bob McNair
- General manager: Rick Smith
- Head coach: Gary Kubiak
- Offensive coordinator: Mike Sherman
- Defensive coordinator: Richard Smith
- Home stadium: Reliant Stadium

Results
- Record: 8–8
- Division place: 4th AFC South
- Playoffs: Did not qualify
- Pro Bowlers: LB DeMeco Ryans

The 2007 Houston Texans season was the franchise's 6th season in the National Football League (NFL) and the 2nd under head coach Gary Kubiak. The Texans improved upon their 6–10 record from the previous, finishing the season at 8–8 for the franchise's first non-losing season.

== Offseason ==
The offseason was dominated by rumors and speculation surrounding the future of David Carr and the Texans. Jake Plummer was a leading candidate to replace Carr until he was traded to Tampa Bay and then retired. The Texans also contacted free agent Jeff Garcia before he signed with Tampa Bay. Finally, on March 21 the Texans struck a deal with Atlanta and traded draft picks for their backup quarterback, Matt Schaub. Carr was cut on March 23 and later signed by the Carolina Panthers.

Another situation of great speculation to fans was that of Domanick Williams. Williams, the Texans all-time leading rusher, had a lingering knee injury that kept him side-lined for the entirety of the 2006 season. The Texans signed Ahman Green during free agency and eventually released Williams on March 23, 2007.

=== Player additions and subtractions ===
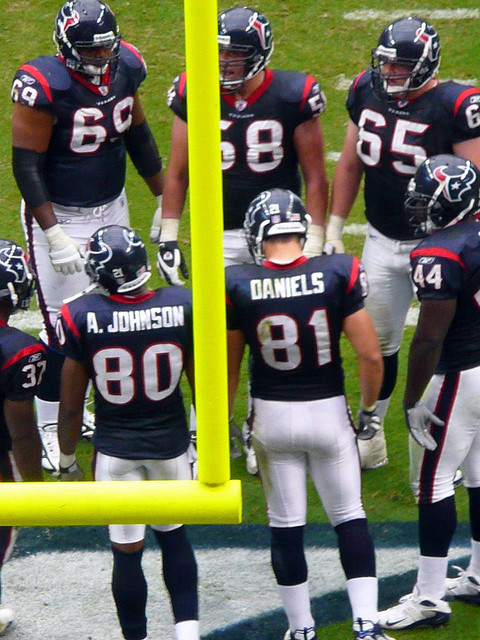
Texans players huddle on offense against Tampa Bay in 2007 week 14

Additions:

- RB Ahman Green
- LB Danny Clark
- SS Michael Boulware
- OT Jordan Black
- DT Jeff Zgonina
- LB Shawn Barber
- QB Matt Schaub
- CB Jamar Fletcher
- WR André Davis

Subtractions:

- DE Antwan Peek
- WR Eric Moulds
- DE Jason Babin
- DT Seth Payne
- OT Zach Wiegert
- CB Lewis Sanders
- RB Domanick Williams
- QB David Carr
- LB Troy Evans
- FS Michael Stone
- LB Kailee Wong

=== Draft ===
2007 Houston Texans draft
Round	Pick	Player	Position	College	Notes
1	10	Amobi Okoye	DT	Louisville	from Atlanta
3	73	Jacoby Jones *	WR	Lane	
4	123	Fred Bennett	CB	South Carolina	from New Orleans
5	144	Brandon Harrison	S	Stanford	
5	163	Brandon Frye	OT	Virginia Tech	from New Orleans
6	183	Kasey Studdard	G	Texas	
7	218	Zac Diles	LB	Kansas State	
Made roster † Pro Football Hall of Fame * Made at least one Pro Bowl during career

The Texans swapped their first-round pick in the 2007 NFL draft (8th overall) with the Atlanta Falcons for their first-round pick (10th overall) as part of the Matt Schaub deal. In drafting Okoye, who was 19 at the time of the draft, the Texans took the youngest player in NFL Draft history. Okoye ended up being a "bust"; the pick immediately after was 7x Pro Bowler Patrick Willis, who was chosen by the San Francisco 49ers.

The Texans also traded their second-round selections in 2007 and 2008 as part of the Schaub deal and did not choose again until the third round, when they took Jacoby Jones from Division II Lane College, the highest picked player who did not play in Division I FBS or FCS that year.

Guard Kasey Studdard (6th round) became the second Texas Longhorns player drafted by the Texans (Sloan Thomas was taken in the 7th round in 2004).

=== Undrafted free agents ===
2007 undrafted free agents of note
Player	Position	College
DelJuan Robinson	Defensive tackle	Mississippi State
Darius Walker	Running back	Notre Dame

== Staff ==
2007 Houston Texans staff
Front office: Founder, chairman and chief executive officer – Bob McNair; Vice chairman – Philip Burguières; General manager – Rick Smith; President – Jamey Rootes; Director of pro personnel – Brian Gardner; Associate director of pro personnel – Bobby Grier; Director of college scouting – Dale Strahm; Coordinator of college scouting – Mike Maccagnan; Head coaches: Head coach – Gary Kubiak; Assistant head coach/offensive coordinator – Mike Sherman; Special assistant to the head coach – Bob Karmelowicz; Offensive coaches: Quarterbacks – Kyle Shanahan; Running backs – Chick Harris; Wide receivers – Larry Kirksey; Tight ends – Brian Pariani; Offensive line – John Benton; Assistant offensive line – Frank Pollack; Offensive assistant – Tim Bender; Offensive assistant – Mike McDaniel	Defensive coaches: Defensive coordinator – Richard Smith; Defensive line – Jethro Franklin; Linebackers – Johnny Holland; Defensive backs – Jon Hoke; Assistant defensive backs – Martin Bayless; Senior defensive assistant – Frank Bush; Defensive assistant – Perry Carter; Defensive assistant – Robert Saleh; Special teams coaches: Special teams – Joe Marciano; Administrative coordinator/coaching assistant – Richard Hightower; Strength and conditioning: Strength and conditioning – Dan Riley; Assistant strength and conditioning – Ray Wright

== Roster ==
Houston Texans 2007 final roster
Quarterbacks: 7 Shane Boyd; 18 Sage Rosenfels; 8 Matt Schaub; Running backs: 43 Jameel Cook FB; 36 Ron Dayne; 44 Vonta Leach FB; 37 Darius Walker; Wide receivers: 89 David Anderson; 11 André Davis KR; 80 Andre Johnson; 12 Jacoby Jones PR; 83 Kevin Walter; Tight ends: 87 Mark Bruener; 81 Owen Daniels; 85 Joel Dreessen; 88 Jeb Putzier	Offensive linemen: 71 Jordan Black T; 65 Mike Brisiel G; 78 Rashad Butler T; 58 Mike Flanagan C; 75 Brandon Frye T; 57 Drew Hodgdon G; 69 Chester Pitts G; 74 Ephraim Salaam T; 64 Kasey Studdard G; 73 Eric Winston T; Defensive linemen: 93 Tim Bulman DT; 96 Earl Cochran DE; 99 Travis Johnson DT; 94 N. D. Kalu DE/DT; 95 Anthony Maddox DT; 91 Amobi Okoye DT; 66 DelJuan Robinson DT; 98 Anthony Weaver DE; 90 Mario Williams DE; 92 Jeff Zgonina DT	Linebackers: 50 Charlie Anderson OLB; 55 Danny Clark OLB; 54 Zac Diles MLB; 56 Morlon Greenwood OLB; 59 DeMeco Ryans MLB; Defensive backs: 32 Fred Bennett CB; 28 Michael Boulware SS; 24 C. C. Brown SS; 40 Curome Cox FS; 47 Will Demps FS; 38 Demarcus Faggins CB; 21 Jamar Fletcher CB; 34 Von Hutchins CB/FS; 25 Dexter Wynn CB/KR/PR; Special teams: 3 Kris Brown K; 48 Bryan Pittman LS; 1 Matt Turk P	Reserve lists: 67 Jon Abbate LB (IR); -- Roc Alexander S (IR); 51 Shawn Barber LB (IR); 26 Glenn Earl S (IR); 30 Ahman Green RB (IR); 31 Brandon Harrison S (IR); 62 Scott Jackson C/G (IR); 78 Cedric Killings DT (IR); 13 Jerome Mathis WR/KR (IR); 76 Steve McKinney C (IR); 23 Dunta Robinson CB (IR); 22 Jason Simmons S (IR); 77 Charles Spencer T (PUP); 27 Chris Taylor RB (IR); 70 Fred Weary G (IR); 63 Chris White C (IR); Practice squad: 33 Arliss Beach RB; 52 Eduardo Castañeda LB ^{Int'l}; 53 Kevis Coley LB; 60 Greg Eslinger C; 19 Derrick Hamilton WR; 42 Brandon Mitchell S; 39 Derrick Roberson CB; 68 Dan Stevenson G; 86 Harry Williams WR; rookies in italics 53 active, 16 inactive, 9 practice squad

== Preseason ==
Week	Date	Opponent	Result	Record	Venue	Recap
1	August 11	Chicago Bears	L 19–20	0–1	Reliant Stadium	Recap
2	August 18	at Arizona Cardinals	W 33–20	1–1	University of Phoenix Stadium	Recap
3	August 25	Dallas Cowboys	W 28–16	2–1	Reliant Stadium	Recap
4	August 30	at Tampa Bay Buccaneers	L 24–31	2–2	Raymond James Stadium	Recap

== Regular season ==
=== Schedule ===
Week	Date	Opponent	Result	Record	Venue	Recap
1	September 9	Kansas City Chiefs	**W** 20–3	1–0	Reliant Stadium	Recap
2	September 16	at Carolina Panthers	**W** 34–21	2–0	Bank of America Stadium	Recap
3	September 23	**Indianapolis Colts**	**L** 24–30	2–1	Reliant Stadium	Recap
4	September 30	at Atlanta Falcons	**L** 16–26	2–2	Georgia Dome	Recap
5	October 7	Miami Dolphins	**W** 22–19	3–2	Reliant Stadium	Recap
6	October 14	at **Jacksonville Jaguars**	**L** 17–37	3–3	Jacksonville Municipal Stadium	Recap
7	October 21	**Tennessee Titans**	**L** 36–38	3–4	Reliant Stadium	Recap
8	October 28	at San Diego Chargers	**L** 10–35	3–5	Qualcomm Stadium	Recap
9	November 4	at Oakland Raiders	**W** 24–17	4–5	McAfee Coliseum	Recap
10	Bye					
11	November 18	New Orleans Saints	**W** 23–10	5–5	Reliant Stadium	Recap
12	November 25	at Cleveland Browns	**L** 17–27	5–6	Cleveland Browns Stadium	Recap
13	December 2	at **Tennessee Titans**	**L** 20–28	5–7	LP Field	Recap
14	December 9	Tampa Bay Buccaneers	**W** 28–14	6–7	Reliant Stadium	Recap
15	December 13	Denver Broncos	**W** 31–13	7–7	Reliant Stadium	Recap
16	December 23	at **Indianapolis Colts**	**L** 15–38	7–8	RCA Dome	Recap
17	December 30	**Jacksonville Jaguars**	**W** 42–28	8–8	Reliant Stadium	Recap

Note: Intra-division opponents are in bold text.

=== Standings ===
AFC South
	W	L	T	PCT	DIV	CONF	PF	PA	STK
^{(2)} Indianapolis Colts	13	3	0	.813	5–1	9–3	450	262	L1
^{(5)} Jacksonville Jaguars	11	5	0	.688	2–4	8–4	411	304	L1
^{(6)} Tennessee Titans	10	6	0	.625	4–2	7–5	301	297	W3
Houston Texans	8	8	0	.500	1–5	5–7	379	384	W1

=== Game summaries ===
==== Week 1: vs. Kansas City Chiefs ====
Week One: Kansas City Chiefs at Houston Texans – Game summary

Quarter	1	2	3	4	Total
Chiefs	0	0	3	0	**3**
**Texans**	0	10	7	3	**20**

at Reliant Stadium, Houston, Texas

- Date: September 9
- Game time: 12:00 PM CDT
- Game weather: None (retractable roof closed)
- Game attendance: 70,080
- Referee: Jerome Boger
- TV announcers (CBS): Ian Eagle (play-by-play) and Solomon Wilcots (color commentator)

Game information

**First quarter**

- No scoring plays

**Second quarter**

- HOU – Kris Brown 26-yard field goal, 7:33. Texans 3–0. **Drive: 10 plays, 21 yards, 3:54.**
- HOU – Andre Johnson 77-yard pass from Matt Schaub (Kris Brown kick), 6:01. Texans 10–0. **Drive: 1 play, 77 yards, 0:12.**

**Third quarter**

- HOU – Mario Williams 38-yard fumble return (Kris Brown kick), 14:01. Texans 17–0.
- KC – Justin Medlock 27-yard field goal, 0:26. Texans 17–3. **Drive: 11 plays, 63 yards, 6:30.**

**Fourth quarter**

- HOU – Kris Brown 28-yard field goal, 5:00. Texans 20–3. **Drive: 15 plays, 65 yards, 10:26.**

**Top passers**

- KC – Damon Huard – 22/33, 168 yards, 2 INT
- HOU – Matt Schaub – 16/22, 225 yards, TD, INT

**Top rushers**

- KC – Larry Johnson – 10 rushes, 43 yards
- HOU – Ahman Green – 16 rushes, 73 yards

**Top receivers**

- KC – Samie Parker – 4 receptions, 48 yards
- HOU – Andre Johnson – 7 receptions, 142 yards, TD

The Texans began their 2007 campaign at home against the Kansas City Chiefs. After a scoreless first quarter, Houston came out pounding in the second quarter with kicker Kris Brown getting a 26-yard field goal, while QB Matt Schaub completed a 77-yard touchdown pass to WR Andre Johnson. In the third quarter, DE Mario Williams showed his reason for being last year's #1 overall pick by returning a fumble 38 yards for a touchdown. Afterwards, the Chiefs got their only score of the game with kicker Justin Medlock nailing a 27-yard field goal. In the fourth quarter, the Texans sealed the victory with Brown kicking a 28-yard field goal.

Matt Schaub, in his Texans debut, went 16 of 22 for 225 yards with 1 touchdown and 1 interception.

With the win, Houston began their season at 1–0.

==== Week 2: at Carolina Panthers ====
Week Two: Houston Texans at Carolina Panthers – Game summary

Quarter	1	2	3	4	Total
**Texans**	7	10	14	3	**34**
Panthers	14	0	0	7	**21**

at Bank of America Stadium, Charlotte, North Carolina

- Date: September 16
- Game time: 12:00 p.m. CDT / 1:00 p.m. EDT
- Game weather: Sunny, 74 °F (23 °C)
- Game attendance: 73,665
- Referee: John Parry
- TV announcers (CBS): Gus Johnson (play-by-play) and Steve Tasker (color commentator)

Game information

**First quarter**

- CAR – Steve Smith Sr. 7-yard pass from Jake Delhomme (John Kasay kick), 6:38. Panthers 7–0. **Drive: 9 plays, 64 yards, 4:31.**
- CAR – Steve Smith Sr. 12-yards pass from Jake Delhomme (John Kasay kick), 5:04. Panthers 14–0. **Drive: 2 plays, 13 yards, 0:30.**
- HOU – Andre Johnson 31-yard pass from Matt Schaub (Kris Brown kick), 3:48. Panthers 14–7. **Drive: 3 plays, 65 yards, 1:16.**

**Second quarter**

- HOU – Andre Johnson 9-yard pass from Matt Schaub (Kris Brown kick), 8:27. Tied 14–14. **Drive: 16 plays, 80 yards, 7:39.**
- HOU – Kris Brown 25-yard field goal, 2:17. Texans 17–14. **Drive: 10 plays, 50 yards, 4:54.**

**Third quarter**

- HOU – Ahman Green 13-yard run (Kris Brown kick), 11:28. Texans 24–14. **Drive: 5 plays, 56 yards, 2:33.**
- HOU – Kevin Walter fumble recovery in end zone (Kris Brown kick), 11:16. Texans 31–14.

**Fourth quarter**

- HOU – Kris Brown 33-yard field goal, 9:07. Texans 34–14. **Drive: 9 plays, 29 yards, 5:39.**
- CAR – Steve Smith Sr. 74-yard pass from Jake Delhomme (John Kasay kick), 4:26. Texans 34–21. **Drive: 3 plays, 99 yards, 1:23.**

**Top passers**

- HOU – Matt Schaub – 20/28, 227 yards, 2 TD
- CAR – Jake Delhomme – 27/41, 316 yards, 3 TD, INT

**Top rushers**

- HOU – Ahman Green – 15 rushes, 71 yards, TD
- CAR – DeAngelo Williams – 8 rushes, 31 yards

**Top receivers**

- HOU – Andre Johnson – 7 receptions, 120 yards, 2 TD
- CAR – Steve Smith Sr. – 8 receptions, 153 yards, 3 TD

Following their home win over the Chiefs, the Texans flew to Bank of America Stadium for their Week 2 match-up against the Carolina Panthers. In the first quarter, Houston trailed early as QB Jake Delhomme hooked up with WR Steve Smith for a 7-yard and a 12-yard TD pass. Houston responded with QB Matt Schaub completing a 31-yard TD pass to WR Andre Johnson. In the second quarter, Schaub and Johnson hooked up with each other again on a 9-yard TD pass. The Texans took the lead prior to halftime with kicker Kris Brown getting a 25-yard field goal.

In the third quarter, Houston increased its lead with RB Ahman Green getting a 13-yard TD run. On the following kickoff, Panthers FB Nick Goings fumbled the ball, causing it to roll into Carolina's end zone, where WR Kevin Walter landed on it for a touchdown, giving a huge momentum swing towards the Texans. In the fourth quarter, Houston put the out the game out of reach with Brown kicking a 33-yard field goal. The Panthers mustered up one last score as Delhomme completed a pass to Smith, who broke off many Texans defenders and ran 74 yards for a touchdown. In the end, Houston held on to win.

With the win, not only did the Texans begin their season at 2–0 for the first time in franchise history, but their 34 points in one game also became a franchise record.

==== Week 3: vs. Indianapolis Colts ====
Week Three: Indianapolis Colts at Houston Texans – Game summary

Quarter	1	2	3	4	Total
**Colts**	7	7	13	3	**30**
Texans	7	3	0	14	**24**

at Reliant Stadium, Houston, Texas

- Date: September 23
- Game time: 12:00 p.m. CDT
- Game weather: None (retractable roof closed)
- Game attendance: 70,765
- Referee: Peter Morelli
- TV announcers (CBS): Ian Eagle (play-by-play) and Solomon Wilcots (color commentator)

Game information

**First quarter**

- HOU – Jerome Mathis 84-yard kickoff return (Kris Brown kick), 14:39. Texans 7–0.
- IND – Dallas Clark 2-yard pass from Peyton Manning (Adam Vinatieri kick), 6:06. Tied 7–7. **Drive: 15 plays, 74 yards, 8:33.**

**Second quarter**

- HOU – Kris Brown 33-yard field goal, 14:18. Texans 10–7. **Drive: 13 plays, 54 yards, 6:48.**
- IND – Joseph Addai 4-yard run (Adam Vinatieri kick), 8:46. Colts 14–10. **Drive: 11 plays, 65 yards, 5:32.**

**Third quarter**

- IND – Adam Vinatieri 36-yard field goal, 10:32. Colts 17–10. **Drive: 8 plays, 56 yards, 4:28.**
- IND – Joseph Addai 8-yard run (Adam Vinatieri kick), 8:38. Colts 24–10. **Drive: 4 plays, 21 yards, 1:35.**
- IND – Adam Vinatieri 28-yard field goal, 2:41. Colts 27–10. **Drive: 5 plays, 62 yards, 2:13.**

**Fourth quarter**

- HOU – Samkon Gado 1-yard run (Kris Brown kick), 14:21. Colts 27–17. **Drive: 7 plays, 73 yards, 3:20.**
- IND – Adam Vinatieri 35-yard field goal, 10:40. Colts 30–17. **Drive: 7 plays, 30 yards, 3:41.**
- HOU – Vonta Leach 1-yard pass from Matt Schaub (Kris Brown kick), 2:49. Colts 30–24. **Drive: 14 plays, 85 yards, 7:51.**

**Top passers**

- IND – Peyton Manning – 20/29, 273 yards, TD
- HOU – Matt Schaub – 27/33, 236 yards, TD, 2 INT

**Top rushers**

- IND – Joseph Addai – 22 rushes, 72 yards, 2 TD
- HOU – Jameel Cook – 5 rushes, 15 yards

**Top receivers**

- IND – Reggie Wayne – 4 receptions, 84 yards
- HOU – André Davis – 4 receptions, 70 yards

Following an impressive win over the Panthers, the Texans went home for an AFC South duel with the defending Super Bowl champions, the Indianapolis Colts (who Houston won against last time at home). In the first quarter, the Texans delivered the first punch with WR Jerome Mathis returning a kickoff 84 yards for a touchdown. However, the Colts responded with QB Peyton Manning completing a 2-yard TD pass to TE Dallas Clark. In the second quarter, Houston retook the lead with kicker Kris Brown getting a 33-yard field goal. However, Indianapolis went ahead with RB Joseph Addais 4-yard TD run.

In the third quarter, the Colts managed to put the Texans in a huge hole with kicker Adam Vinatieri's 36-yard field goal, Addai's 8-yard TD run, and Vinatieri's 28-yard field goal. In the fourth quarter, Houston tried a comeback with RB Samkon Gado's 1-yard TD run. Indianapolis got their final score of the game with Vinatieri kicking a 35-yard field goal. The Texans drew close with QB Matt Schaub's 1-yard TD pass to RB Vonta Leach. However, the Colts managed to hold on to win.

With the loss, Houston fell to 2–1.

==== Week 4: at Atlanta Falcons ====
Week Four: Houston Texans at Atlanta Falcons – Game summary

Quarter	1	2	3	4	Total
Texans	7	3	3	3	**16**
**Falcons**	10	10	3	3	**26**

at Georgia Dome, Atlanta, Georgia

- Date: September 30
- Game time: 12:00 p.m. CDT / 1:00 p.m. EDT
- Game weather: None (played indoors)
- Game attendance: 69,312
- Referee: Gerry Austin
- TV announcers (CBS): Don Criqui (play-by-play) and Steve Beuerlein (color commentator)

Game information

**First quarter**

- ATL – Morten Andersen 28-yard field goal, 8:14. Falcons 3–0. **Drive: 7 plays, 42 yards, 3:01.**
- HOU – André Davis 35-yard pass from Matt Schaub (Kris Brown kick), 5:34. Texans 7–3. **Drive: 7 plays, 74 yards, 2:40.**
- ATL – Michael Jenkins 5-yard pass from Joey Harrington (Morten Andersen kick), 1:13. Falcons 10–7. **Drive: 8 plays, 14 yards, 4:21.**

**Second quarter**

- ATL – Michael Jenkins 7-yard pass from Joey Harrington (Morten Andersen kick), 8:22. Falcons 17–7. **Drive: 4 plays, 34 yards, 1:51.**
- ATL – Morten Andersen 22-yard field goal, 1:52. Falcons 20–7. **Drive: 7 plays, 58 yards, 3:46.**
- HOU – Kris Brown 42-yard field goal, 0:05. Falcons 20–10. **Drive: 9 plays, 52 yards, 1:47.**

**Third quarter**

- HOU – Kris Brown 37-yard field goal, 10:13. Falcons 20–13. **Drive: 10 plays, 61 yards, 4:47.**
- ATL – Morten Andersen 36-yard field goal, 4:00. Falcons 23–13. **Drive: 12 plays, 62 yards, 6:13.**

**Fourth quarter**

- HOU – Kris Brown 19-yard field goal, 14:52. Falcons 23–16. **Drive: 9 plays, 64 yards, 4:08.**
- ATL – Morten Andersen 46-yard field goal, 8:16. Falcons 26–16. **Drive: 12 plays, 51 yards, 6:36.**

**Top passers**

- HOU – Matt Schaub – 28/40, 317 yards, TD
- ATL – Joey Harrington – 23/29, 223 yards, 2 TD

**Top rushers**

- HOU – Ron Dayne – 15 rushes, 62 yards
- ATL – Warrick Dunn – 18 rushes, 62 yards

**Top receivers**

- HOU – André Davis – 5 receptions, 117 yards, TD
- ATL – Michael Jenkins – 6 receptions, 64 yards, 2 TD

Hoping to rebound from their divisional home loss to the Colts, the Texans flew to the Georgia Dome for an interconference battle with the winless Atlanta Falcons, where QB Matt Schaub fought against his former team.

In the first quarter, Houston trailed early as Falcons kicker Morten Andersen nailed a 28-yard field goal. The Texans managed to take the lead with Schaub completing a 35-yard TD pass to WR André Davis. However, Atlanta regained the lead with QB Joey Harrington completing a 5-yard TD pass to WR Michael Jenkins In the second quarter, Houston's current woes continued with Harrington and Jenkins hooking up with each other again as 7-yard TD pass, along with Andersen kicking a 22-yard field goal. The Texans got their only score of the period with kicker Kris Brown nailing a 42-yard field goal.

In the third quarter, Houston kept closer with a 37-yard field goal, but the Falcons eventually responded with Andersen kicking a 36-yard field goal. In the fourth quarter, the Texans again crept closer with Brown getting a 19-yard field. Yet again, Atlanta replied with Andersen kicking a 46-yard field goal. Afterwards, the Falcons held on to get their first win of the year.

With their second-straight loss, the Texans fell to 2–2.

==== Week 5: vs. Miami Dolphins ====
Week Five: Miami Dolphins at Houston Texans – Game summary

Quarter	1	2	3	4	Total
Dolphins	10	6	0	3	**19**
**Texans**	7	3	6	6	**22**

at Reliant Stadium, Houston, Texas

- Date: October 7
- Game time: 12:00 p.m. CDT
- Game weather: None (retractable roof closed)
- Game attendance: 70,156
- Referee: Tony Corrente
- TV announcers (CBS): Kevin Harlan (play-by-play) and Rich Gannon (color commentator)

Trying to snap a two-game losing streak, the Texans returned home for a Week 5 duel with the winless Miami Dolphins. In the first quarter, Houston took the early lead with RB Ron Dayne getting a 1-yard TD run. However, the Dolphin answered with kicker Jay Feely getting a 23-yard field goal, along with RB Ronnie Brown getting a 3-yard TD run. In the second quarter, the Texans' recent struggles continued as Miami managed to get 40-yard and a 33-yard field goal from Feely. The Texans ended the half with kicker Kris Brown getting a 54-yard field goal.

In the third quarter, Houston began to retaliate with Brown nailing a 43-yard and a 54-yard field goal. In the fourth quarter, the Dolphins managed to get a 48-yard field goal. The Texans snapped their two-game skid with Brown making field goals from 20 and 57 yards.

With the win, the Texans improved to 3–2.

==== Week 6: at Jacksonville Jaguars ====
Week Six: Houston Texans at Jacksonville Jaguars – Game summary

Quarter	1	2	3	4	Total
Texans	3	3	3	8	**17**
**Jaguars**	0	10	6	21	**37**

at Jacksonville Municipal Stadium, Jacksonville, Florida

- Date: October 14
- Game time: 12:00 p.m. CDT / 1:00 p.m. EDT
- Game weather: Partly cloudy, 82 °F (28 °C)
- Game attendance: 63,715
- Referee: Mike Carey
- TV announcers (CBS): Gus Johnson (play-by-play) and Steve Tasker (color commentator)

Coming off their home win over the Dolphins, the Texans flew to Jacksonville Municipal Stadium for a Week 6 AFC South showdown with the Jacksonville Jaguars. In the first quarter, Houston struck first with kicker Kris Brown getting a 20-yard field goal for the only score of the period. In the second quarter, the Texans increased its lead with Brown kicking a 35-yard field goal. However, the Jaguars took the lead with QB David Garrard completing a 1-yard TD pass to TE George Wrighster, along with kicker John Carney getting a 37-yard field goal.

In the third quarter, Houston continued to trail as Garrard completed a 9-yard TD pass to WR Reggie Williams (with a blocked PAT). The Texans responded with Brown getting a 33-yard field goal. However, in the fourth quarter, Jacksonville pulled away with RB Maurice Jones-Drew getting a 7-yard TD run, LB Daryl Smith returning a fumble 77 yards for a touchdown, and Jones-Drew getting a 57-yard TD run. Houston's only response was back-up QB Sage Rosenfels completing a 1-yard TD pass to FB Vonta Leach.

With the loss, the Texans fell to 3–3.

So far this year, Houston is 1–3 without WR Andre Johnson, who was still recovering from injuries.

==== Week 7: vs. Tennessee Titans ====
Week Seven: Tennessee Titans at Houston Texans – Game summary

Quarter	1	2	3	4	Total
**Titans**	6	16	10	6	**38**
Texans	7	0	0	29	**36**

at Reliant Stadium, Houston, Texas

- Date: October 21
- Game time: 12:00 p.m. CDT
- Game weather: None (retractable roof closed)
- Game attendance: 70,734
- Referee: Larry Nemmers
- TV announcers (NFL on CBS): Dick Enberg (play-by-play) & Randy Cross (color commentator)

Game information

**First quarter**

- TEN – Rob Bironas 52-yard field goal, 12:30. Titans 3–0. **Drive: 6 plays, 35 yards, 2:30.**
- HOU – DeMeco Ryans 26-yard fumble return (Kris Brown kick), 9:43. Texans 7–3.
- TEN – Rob Bironas 25-yard field goal, 0:52. Texans 7–6. **Drive: 10 plays, 31 yards, 4:46.**

**Second quarter**

- TEN – Rob Bironas 21-yard field goal, 11:46. Titans 9–7. **Drive: 5 plays, 45 yards, 2:14.**
- TEN – LenDale White 1-yard run (Rob Bironas kick), 5:36. Titans 16–7. **Drive: 9 plays, 77 yards, 4:29.**
- TEN – Rob Bironas 30-yard field goal, 1:06. Titans 19–7. **Drive: 9 plays, 38 yards, 2:53.**
- TEN – Rob Bironas 28-yard field goal, 0:00. Titans 22–7. **Drive: 5 plays, 22 yards, 0:45.**

**Third quarter**

- TEN – Rob Bironas 43-yard field goal, 10:53. Titans 25–7. **Drive: 7 plays, 5 yards, 3:15.**
- TEN – Chris Henry 4-yard run (Rob Bironas kick), 3:01. Titans 32–7. **Drive: 12 plays, 73 yards, 6:24.**

**Fourth quarter**

- HOU – David Anderson 7-yard pass from Sage Rosenfels (André Davis pass from Sage Rosenfels), 13:43. Titans 32–15. **Drive: 9 plays, 70 yards, 4:18.**
- HOU – Kevin Walter 6-yard pass from Sage Rosenfels (Kris Brown kick), 8:15. Titans 32–22. **Drive: 7 plays, 98 yards, 3:53.**
- TEN – Rob Bironas 29-yard field goal, 3:47. Titans 35–22. **Drive: 4 plays, 6 yards, 0:27.**
- HOU – Jeb Putzier 7-yard pass from Sage Rosenfels (Kris Brown kick), 1:37. Titans 35–29. **Drive: 12 plays, 75 yards, 2:10.**
- HOU – André Davis 53-yard pass from Sage Rosenfels (Kris Brown kick), 0:57. Texans 36–35. **Drive: 3 plays, 69 yards, 0:40.**
- TEN – Rob Bironas 29-yard field goal, 0:00. Titans 38–36. **Drive: 6 plays, 69 yards, 0:57.**

**Top passers**

- TEN – Kerry Collins – 25/42, 280 yards
- HOU – Sage Rosenfels – 22/35, 290 yards, 4 TD, 3 INT

**Top rushers**

- TEN – LenDale White – 27 rushes, 104 yards, TD
- HOU – Ahman Green – 11 rushes, 39 yards

**Top receivers**

- TEN – Roydell Williams – 5 receptions, 124 yards
- HOU – Kevin Walter – 6 receptions, 97 yards, TD

Hoping to rebound from their divisional road loss to the Jaguars, the Texans went home for a Week 7 AFC South showdown with the Tennessee Titans. In the first quarter, the Titans struck first with kicker Rob Bironas getting a 52-yard field goal. Houston responded with LB DeMeco Ryans returning a fumble 26 yards for a touchdown. However, Tennessee answered with Bironas getting a 25-yard field goal. In the second quarter, Houston began to struggle as the Titans increased its lead with Bironas kicking a 21-yard field goal, RB LenDale White getting a 1-yard TD run, and even Bironas with a 30-yard and a 28-yard field goal.

In the third quarter, the Texans continued to struggle as Bironas gave Tennessee a 43-yard field goal, while RB Chris Henry got a 4-yard TD run. However, in the fourth quarter, Houston began to fight back. It began with QB Sage Rosenfels completing a 7-yard TD pass to WR David Anderson. It continued with Rosenfels' 6-yard TD pass to WR Kevin Walter. The Titans got a 29-yard field goal by Bironas. Afterwards, the Texans continued its comeback with Rosenfels completing a 7-yard TD pass to TE Jeb Putzier and a 53-yard TD pass to WR André Davis. Tennessee got the last-second win as Bironas barely made a 29-yard field goal, making him the first kicker in NFL history to get 8 field goals in one game.

With their second-straight loss, Houston fell to 3–4.

==== Week 8: at San Diego Chargers ====
Week Eight: Houston Texans at San Diego Chargers – Game summary

Quarter	1	2	3	4	Total
Texans	0	3	0	7	**10**
**Chargers**	14	21	0	0	**35**

at Qualcomm Stadium, San Diego, California

- Date: October 28
- Game time: 3:05 p.m. CDT / 1:05 PDT
- Game weather: Slight haze, 78 °F (26 °C)
- Game attendance: 60,439
- Referee: Bill Leavy
- TV announcers (CBS): Greg Gumbel (play-by-play) and Dan Dierdorf (color commentator)

Trying to snap a two-game skid, the Texans flew to Qualcomm Stadium for a Week 8 intraconference game against the San Diego Chargers. In the first quarter, Houston's recent struggles continued as Chargers QB Philip Rivers completed a 49-yard TD pass to TE Antonio Gates. Later, a goof-up on special teams led to more points as a high punt snap went into the end zone. Punter Matt Turk was unable to fall on the ball and San Diego CB Antonio Cromartie managed to recover it for a touchdown. In the second quarter, the Texans got on the board with kicker Kris Brown nailing a 40-yard field goal. However, the Chargers continued their beatdown with Rivers and Gates hooking up again on a 31-yard TD pass. Later, San Diego increased its lead with Cromartie returning an interception 70 yards for a touchdown, along with Rivers completing a 14-yard TD pass to WR Chris Chambers.

After a scoreless third quarter, Houston tried to come back, as QB Sage Rosenfels completed a 28-yard TD to TE Joel Dreessen in the fourth quarter. That was as close to the Chargers as they got.

With their third-straight loss, the Texans fell to 3–5.

Starting QB Matt Schaub (11/18 for 77 yards and 2 interceptions) left the game in the second quarter with a concussion, after getting a late hit from San Diego CB Drayton Florence.

The team is now 1–5 without WR Andre Johnson.

==== Week 9: at Oakland Raiders ====
Week Nine: Houston Texans at Oakland Raiders – Game summary

Quarter	1	2	3	4	Total
**Texans**	7	10	0	7	**24**
Raiders	0	0	3	14	**17**

at McAfee Coliseum, Oakland, California

- Date: November 4
- Game time: 3:15 p.m. CST / 1:15 p.m. PST
- Game weather: 70 °F (21 °C) (Clear Skies)
- Game attendance: 49,603
- Referee: Peter Morelli
- TV announcers (CBS): Gus Johnson (play-by-play) and Steve Tasker (color commentator)

Trying to snap a three-game skid, the Texans flew to McAfee Coliseum for a Week 9 intraconference duel with the Oakland Raiders. With QB Matt Schaub out with a concussion, back-up QB Sage Rosenfels got the start.

In the first quarter, Houston drew first blood as RB Ahman Green got an 8-yard TD run for the only score of the period. In the second quarter, the Texans continued to roll over the Raiders as RB Ron Dayne got a 14-yard TD run, while kicker Kris Brown nailed a 40-yard field goal. In the third quarter, Oakland finally managed to respond as kicker Sebastian Janikowski managed to get a 22-yard field goal for the only score of the period. In the fourth quarter, the Raiders drew closer as RB Justin Fargas got a 1-yard TD run. Houston took control with Rosenfels completing a 42-yard TD pass to WR André Davis. Oakland's only response was QB Josh McCown completing a 28-yard TD pass to WR Tim Dwight.

With their three-game skid snapped, the Texans entered their bye week at 4–5.

The win also kept Houston unbeaten (3–0) against the Raiders.

==== Week 11: vs. New Orleans Saints ====
Week Eleven: New Orleans Saints at Houston Texans – Game summary

Quarter	1	2	3	4	Total
Saints	3	7	0	0	**10**
**Texans**	7	10	0	6	**23**

at Reliant Stadium, Houston, Texas

- Date: November 18
- Game time: 12:00 p.m. CST
- Game weather: None (retractable roof closed)
- Game attendance: 70,780
- Referee: Mike Carey
- TV announcers (Fox): Chris Rose (play-by-play) & Terry Donahue (color commentator)

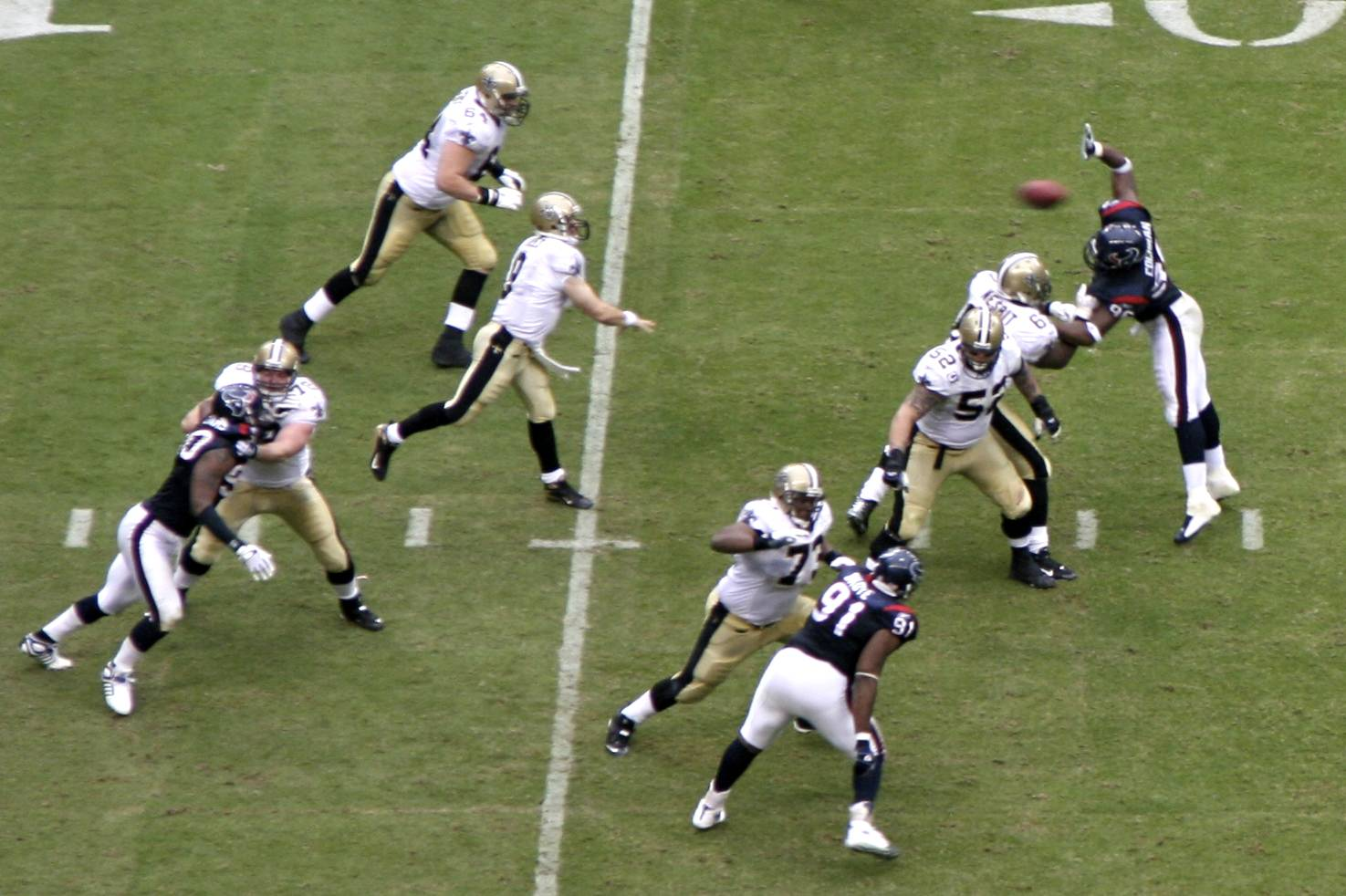
Saints QB Drew Brees passes at Houston, week 11

Coming off their bye week, the Texans were at home for a Week 11 interconference duel with the New Orleans Saints. In the first quarter, Houston trailed early as Saints kicker Olindo Mare completed a 52-yard field goal. The Texans responded with QB Matt Schaub completing a 73-yard TD pass to WR Andre Johnson. In the second quarter, New Orleans regained the lead with QB Drew Brees completing a 6-yard TD pass to WR Devery Henderson. Houston replied with Schaub completing a 10-yard TD pass to TE Joel Dreesen, along with kicker Kris Brown getting a 36-yard field goal.

After a scoreless third quarter, the Texans took control in the fourth quarter as Brown nailed a 53-yard and a 23-yard field goal.

With the win, the Texans (for the first time in franchise history) improved to 5–5.

Andre Johnson, in his first game back from injuries, had an impressive day with 6 receptions for 120 yards and 1 touchdown.

DE Mario Williams had a big game, as he had 6 tackles, a sack, and a forced fumble.

==== Week 12: at Cleveland Browns ====
Week Twelve: Houston Texans at Cleveland Browns – Game summary

Quarter	1	2	3	4	Total
Texans	7	3	0	7	**17**
**Browns**	0	14	3	10	**27**

at Cleveland Browns Stadium, Cleveland, Ohio

- Date: November 25
- Game time: 12:00 p.m. CST / 1:00 p.m. EST
- Game weather: Sunny, 41 °F (5 °C)
- Game attendance: 72,730
- Referee: Terry McAulay
- TV announcers (CBS): Gus Johnson (play-by-play) and Steve Tasker (color commentator)

Coming off their home win over the Saints, the Texans flew to Cleveland Browns Stadium for a Week 12 duel with the Cleveland Browns. In the first quarter, Houston shot first as QB Matt Schaub completed a 17-yard TD pass to WR Kevin Walter for the only score of the period. In the second quarter, the Browns got on the board as QB Derek Anderson completed a 19-yard TD pass to WR Braylon Edwards. The Texans regained the lead as kicker Kris Brown managed to get a 41-yard field goal. However, Cleveland took the lead again as Anderson completed a 7-yard TD pass to TE Kellen Winslow.

In the third quarter, Houston started to fall behind as Browns kicker Phil Dawson managed to get a 25-yard field goal for the only score of the period. In the fourth quarter, Cleveland sealed the win with Dawson nailing a 27-yard field goal and RB Jamal Lewis getting a 1-yard TD run. The Texans' only response was Schaub's 6-yard TD pass to TE Owen Daniels.

With the loss, Houston fell to 5–6.

The Browns defense managed to hold Andre Johnson to a season-low 3 receptions for 37 yards.

==== Week 13: at Tennessee Titans ====
Week Thirteen: Houston Texans at Tennessee Titans – Game summary

Quarter	1	2	3	4	Total
Texans	7	3	0	10	**20**
**Titans**	7	0	14	7	**28**

at LP Field, Nashville, Tennessee

- Date: December 2
- Game time: 12:00 p.m. CST
- Game weather: Cloudy, 61 °F (16 °C)
- Game attendance: 69,143
- Referee: Jeff Triplette
- TV announcers (CBS): Kevin Harlan (play-by-play) and Rich Gannon (color commentator)

Hoping ro rebound from their road loss to the Browns, the Texans flew to LP Field for a Week 13 AFC South rematch with the Tennessee Titans. In the first quarter, Houston got the first punch as RB Ron Dayne got a 1-yard TD run. The Titans responded with RB LenDale White getting a 1-yard TD run. In the second quarter, Houston regained the lead with kicker Kris Brown getting a 45-yard field goal for the only score of the period.

In the third quarter, the Tennessee took the lead with QB Vince Young completing a 43-yard TD pass to WR Roydell Williams, along with an 11-yard TD pass to WR Justin Gage. In the fourth quarter, the Texans tried to get a comeback as QB Sage Rosenfels completed a 28-yard TD pass to WR Andre Johnson, yet the Titans responded with RB Chris Brown getting a 7-yard TD run. Houston tried to come back and take the lead, but their only response was Browns' 50-yard field goal.

With the loss, the Texans fell to 5–7. They have now lost 7 out of their last 8 divisional road games.

QB Matt Schaub (3/5 for 34 yards) was knocked out of the game in the first quarter with a left shoulder injury.

==== Week 14: vs. Tampa Bay Buccaneers ====
Week Fourteen: Tampa Bay Buccaneers at Houston Texans – Game summary

Quarter	1	2	3	4	Total
Buccaneers	0	7	7	0	**14**
**Texans**	7	7	7	7	**28**

at Reliant Stadium, Houston, Texas

- Date: December 9
- Game time: 12:00 p.m. CST
- Game weather: Indoor (Roof closed)
- Game attendance: 70,237
- Referee: Bill Leavy
- TV announcers (Fox): Dick Stockton (play-by-play) & Terry Donahue (color commentator)

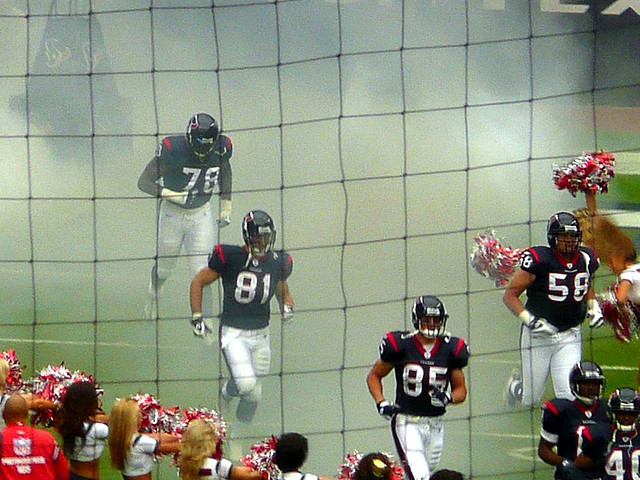
Texans players enter the field against Tampa Bay

Trying to snap a two-game losing skid, the Texans went home for a Week 14 interconference duel with the Tampa Bay Buccaneers. In the first quarter, Houston drew first blood as QB Sage Rosenfels completed a 4-yard TD pass to WR Andre Johnson for the only score of the period. In the second quarter, the Buccaneers got on the board with RB Earnest Graham getting a 4-yard TD run. Afterwards, Houston answered with Rosenfels completing an 8-yard TD pass to WR Kevin Walter.

In the third quarter, the Texans immediately increased their lead as WR André Davis returned the half's opening kickoff 97 yards for a touchdown. Tampa Bay responded with Graham getting an 11-yard TD run. In the fourth quarter, Houston ended the game with Rosenfels completing a 4-yard TD pass to TE Owen Daniels.

With the win, the Texans improved to 6–7.

For DE Mario Williams (the 1st pick of last year's draft), his 1 sack in the game increased his season total to a franchise-best 9.5 sacks.

==== Week 15: vs. Denver Broncos ====
Week Fifteen: Denver Broncos at Houston Texans – Game summary

Quarter	1	2	3	4	Total
Broncos	0	6	7	0	**13**
**Texans**	7	3	7	14	**31**

at Reliant Stadium, Houston, Texas

- Date: December 13
- Game time: 7:15 p.m. CST
- Game weather: Mostly cloudy, 60 °F (16 °C) (retractable roof open)
- Game attendance: 70,747
- Referee: Bill Carollo
- TV announcers (NFL Network): Tom Hammond (play-by-play) & Cris Collinsworth (play-by-play)

Game information

**First quarter**

- HOU – Sage Rosenfels 5-yard run (Kris Brown kick), 11:04. Texans 7–0. **Drive: 7 plays, 56 yards, 3:56.**

**Second quarter**

- DEN – Jason Elam 41-yard field goal, 8:49. Texans 7–3. **Drive: 17 plays, 70 yards, 9:20.**
- HOU – Kris Brown 41-yard field goal, 7:38. Texans 10–3. **Drive: 5 plays, 20 yards, 1:11.**
- DEN – Jason Elam 47-yard field goal, 4:31. Texans 10–6. **Drive: 8 plays, 46 yards, 3:07.**

**Third quarter**

- HOU – Ron Dayne 6-yard run (Kris Brown kick), 5:17. Texans 17–6. **Drive: 10 plays, 66 yards, 5:21.**
- DEN – Tony Scheffler 12-yard pass from Jay Cutler (Jason Elam kick), 0:36. Texans 17–13. **Drive: 3 plays, 27 yards, 1:24.**

**Fourth quarter**

- HOU – Andre Johnson 4-yard pass from Sage Rosenfels (Kris Brown kick), 10:06. Texans 24–13. **Drive: 9 plays, 60 yards, 5:30.**
- HOU – Vonta Leach 1-yard run (Kris Brown kick), 3:20. Texans 31–13. **Drive: 8 plays, 69 yards, 5:01.**

**Top passers**

- DEN – Jay Cutler – 27/39, 254 yards, TD
- HOU – Sage Rosenfels – 16/27, 200 yards, TD, INT

**Top rushers**

- DEN – Selvin Young – 8 rushes, 34 yards
- HOU – Ron Dayne – 11 rushes, 67 yards, TD

**Top receivers**

- DEN – Brandon Marshall – 11 receptions, 107 yards
- HOU – Andre Johnson – 6 receptions, 86 yards, TD

Coming off their impressive home win over the Buccaneers, the Texans stayed at home, donned their battle red alternates, and played a Thursday night intraconference duel with the Denver Broncos as head coach Gary Kubiak faced his former team. In the first quarter, Houston drew first blood as QB Sage Rosenfels got a 5-yard TD run for the only score of the period. In the second quarter, the Broncos got on the board with kicker Jason Elam getting a 41-yard field goal. Afterwards, the Texans responded with kicker Kris Brown getting a 41-yard field goal. Denver ended the half as Elam nailed a 47-yard field goal.

In the third quarter, Houston replied with RB Ron Dayne getting a 6-yard TD run. Denver answered with QB Jay Cutler completing a 12-yard TD pass to TE Tony Scheffler. In the fourth quarter, the Texans pulled away as Rosenfels completed a 4-yard TD pass to WR Andre Johnson, while FB Vonta Leach managed to get a 1-yard TD run.

With the win, Houston improved to 7–7. The game marked the only appearance of the Texans on primetime television of the season, their first since 2005, and the first game in 2007 played with the roof open.

==== Week 16: at Indianapolis Colts ====
Week Sixteen: Houston Texans at Indianapolis Colts – Game summary

Quarter	1	2	3	4	Total
Texans	7	0	0	8	**15**
**Colts**	3	21	14	0	**38**

at RCA Dome, Indianapolis, Indiana

- Date: December 23
- Game time: 12:00 p.m. CST
- Game weather: None (played indoors)
- Game attendance: 57,262
- Referee: Ed Hochuli
- TV announcers (CBS): Kevin Harlan (play-by-play) and Rich Gannon (color commentator)

Game information

**First quarter**

- HOU – Kevin Walter 17-yard pass from Sage Rosenfels (Kris Brown kick), 11:14. Texans 7–0. **Drive: 7 plays, 76 yards, 3:46.**
- IND – Adam Vinatieri 29-yard field goal, 6:55. Texans 7–3. **Drive: 11 plays, 54 yards, 4:19.**

**Second quarter**

- IND – Joseph Addai 2-yard run (Adam Vinatieri kick), 12:08. Colts 10–7. **Drive: 12 plays, 92 yards, 6:40.**
- IND – Dallas Clark 6-yard pass from Peyton Manning (Adam Vinatieri kick), 5:42. Colts 17–7. **Drive: 8 plays, 94 yards, 4:21.**
- IND – Dallas Clark 11-yard pass from Peyton Manning (Adam Vinatieri kick), 3:39. Colts 24–7. **Drive: 4 plays, 26 yards, 1:41.**

**Third quarter**

- IND – Clifton Dawson 4-yard run (Adam Vinatieri kick), 10:20. Colts 31–7. **Drive: 9 plays, 80 yards, 4:40.**
- IND – Reggie Wayne 7-yard pass from Peyton Manning (Adam Vinatieri kick), 3:08. Colts 38–7. **Drive: 7 plays, 66 yards, 3:20.**

**Fourth quarter**

- HOU – Andre Johnson 6-yard pass from Sage Rosenfels (Darius Walker run), 1:07. Colts 38–15. **Drive: 4 plays, 31 yards, 0:37.**

**Top passers**

- HOU – Sage Rosenfels – 22/36, 233 yards, 2 TD, 3 INT
- IND – Peyton Manning – 28/35, 311 yards, 3 TD

**Top rushers**

- HOU – Darius Walker – 19 rushes, 66 yards
- IND – Kenton Keith – 10 rushes, 60 yards

**Top receivers**

- HOU – Andre Johnson – 7 receptions, 74 yards, TD
- IND – Reggie Wayne – 10 receptions, 143 yards, TD

Coming off an impressive blowout of the Denver Broncos, the Texans packed up and traveled to Indianapolis to do battle with their division rival. Houston drew first blood with as QB Sage Rosenfels threw a 17-yard TD pass to Kevin Walter. The Colts responded to the TD with a 29-yard Vinatieri field goal. The Colts, who got off to a slow start in the 1st Quarter, scored three touchdowns in the 2nd quarter, a 2-yard TD run by Joseph Addai and two Peyton Manning TD passes to tight end Dallas Clark. In the 3rd quarter, the Colts continued to pull away from the struggling Texans. Clifton Dawson scored a 4-yard TD Run and Manning passed to Reggie Wayne for a 7-yard TD. In the 4th quarter, the Colts put in backups and QB Sage Rosenfels threw a 6-yard TD to Andre Johnson and Darius Walker rushed up the middle for the 2-Point Conversion. The Texans fell 38–15, ending their 2-game win streak and hopes for their first winning season.

With the loss, the Texans fell to 7–8.

==== Week 17: vs. Jacksonville Jaguars ====
Week Seventeen: Jacksonville Jaguars at Houston Texans – Game summary

Quarter	1	2	3	4	Total
Jaguars	7	7	7	7	**28**
**Texans**	0	21	14	7	**42**

at Reliant Stadium, Houston, Texas

- Date: December 30
- Game time: 12:00 p.m. CST
- Game weather: Sunny, 69 °F (21 °C) (retractable roof open)
- Game attendance: 70,059
- Referee: Tony Corrente
- TV announcers (CBS): Dick Enberg (play-by-play) & Randy Cross (play-by-play)

Game information

**First quarter**

- JAX – Reggie Williams 22-yard pass from Quinn Gray (Josh Scobee kick), 7:12. Jaguars 7–0. **Drive: 14 plays, 84 yards, 7:48.**

**Second quarter**

- HOU – Ron Dayne 2-yard run (Kris Brown kick), 14:57. Tied 7–7. **Drive: 2 plays, 28 yards, 0:11.**
- HOU – Owen Daniels 2-yard pass from Sage Rosenfels (Kris Brown kick), 3:21. Texans 14–7. **Drive: 15 plays, 84 yards, 8:34.**
- JAX – Ernest Wilford 6-yard pass from Quinn Gray (Josh Scobee kick), 0:29. Tied 14–14. **Drive: 9 plays, 66 yards, 2:52.**
- HOU – André Davis 97-yard kickoff return (Kris Brown kick), 0:15. Texans 21–14.

**Third quarter**

- HOU – André Davis 104-yard kickoff return (Kris Brown kick), 14:47. Texans 28–14.
- HOU – Ron Dayne 12-yard run (Kris Brown kick), 7:19. Texans 35–14. **Drive: 9 plays, 64 yards, 5:10.**
- JAX – Matt Jones 5-yard pass from Quinn Gray (Josh Scobee kick), 1:53. Texans 35–21. **Drive: 10 plays, 82 yards, 5:26.**

**Fourth quarter**

- HOU – Darius Walker 1-yard run (Kris Brown kick), 13:07. Texans 42–21. **Drive: 7 plays, 72 yards, 3:46.**
- JAX – Ernest Wilford 17-yard pass from Quinn Gray (Kris Brown kick), 2:56. Texans 42–28. **Drive: 12 plays, 53 yards, 7:17.**

**Top passers**

- JAX – Quinn Gray – 25/39, 302 yards, 4 TD
- HOU – Sage Rosenfels – 11/18, 128 yards, TD, INT

**Top rushers**

- JAX – Greg Jones – 14 rushes, 71 yards
- HOU – Ron Dayne – 21 rushes, 88 yards, 2 TD

**Top receivers**

- JAX – Matt Jones – 8 receptions, 138 yards, TD
- HOU – Andre Johnson – 6 receptions, 74 yards

Hoping to end their season on a high note, the Texans went home and played a Week 17 AFC South rematch with the Jacksonville Jaguars (who were playing mainly with backups, due to them already clinching a playoff berth).

In the first quarter, Houston trailed early as QB Quinn Gray completed a 22-yard TD pass to WR Reggie Williams for the only score of the period. In the second quarter, the Texans took the lead with RB Ron Dayne getting a 2-yard TD run and QB Sage Rosenfels completing a 2-yard TD pass to TE Owen Daniels. Jacksonville tied the game with Gray completing a 6-yard TD pass to WR Ernest Wilford. Afterwards, Houston immediately responded with WR André Davis returning a kickoff 97 yards for a touchdown.

In the third quarter, the Texans increased their lead as Davis returned the second half's opening kickoff 104 yards for a touchdown. In doing so, Davis became the 7th player in NFL history to return two kickoffs for touchdowns in the same game. Afterwards, Houston kept its momentum going with Dayne getting a 12-yard TD run. The Jaguars responded with Gray completing a 5-yard TD pass to WR Matt Jones. In the fourth quarter, the Texans pulled away with RB Darius Walker getting a 1-yard TD run. Jacksonville ended the game with Gray and Wilford hooking up with each other again on a 17-yard TD pass.

With the win, Houston finished its season at 8–8.

For the year, the Texans scored a total of 43 touchdowns and managed to get 8 wins on the year (both franchise records).

== Statistics ==
=== Team ===
Category	Total yards	Yards per game	NFL rank (out of 32)
Passing offense	3,751	234.4	11th
Rushing offense	1,586	99.1	22nd
Total offense	5,337	333.6	14th
Passing defense	3,682	230.1	25th
Rushing defense	1,825	114.1	19th
Total defense	5,507	344.2	24th

=== Individual ===
Category	Player	Total
Offense
Passing yards	Matt Schaub	2,241
Passing touchdowns	Matt Schaub	9
Rushing yards	Ron Dayne	773
Rushing touchdowns	Ron Dayne	6
Receiving yards	Andre Johnson	851
Receiving touchdowns	Andre Johnson	8
Defense
Tackles (Solo)	DeMeco Ryans	99
Sacks	Mario Williams	14
Interceptions	Fred Bennett	3
