= 2008 Houston Texans season =

7th season in franchise history

- Owner: Bob McNair
- General manager: Rick Smith
- Head coach: Gary Kubiak
- Offensive coordinator: Kyle Shanahan
- Defensive coordinator: Richard Smith
- Home stadium: Reliant Stadium

Results
- Record: 8–8
- Division place: 3rd AFC South
- Playoffs: Did not qualify
- Pro Bowlers: 3: WR Andre Johnson; OLB Mario Williams; TE Owen Daniels

The 2008 Houston Texans season was the franchise's 7th season in the National Football League (NFL) and the 3rd under head coach Gary Kubiak. Though the Texans lost their first four games of the season, they rallied and won five of their last six games, to finish with an 8–8 record for the second consecutive year.

The 2008 season also marked the Texans' first appearance on Monday Night Football.

== Offseason ==
=== Coaching changes ===
Head coach Gary Kubiak entered his third year with the Texans. Alex Gibbs, who implemented his successful zone blocking scheme with the Denver Broncos and the Atlanta Falcons joined the staff as the assistant head coach, replacing Mike Sherman, who left to become the head coach at Texas A&M. Kyle Shanahan, son of Broncos coach Mike Shanahan, took over as the offensive coordinator in place of Sherman.

=== Player additions/subtractions ===
Additions:

- LB Kevin Bentley
- RB Chris Brown
- SS Nick Ferguson
- QB Quinn Gray (Released before regular season)
- C Chris Myers
- CB Jacques Reeves
- LB Chaun Thompson
- LB Rosevelt Colvin (Released before regular season)

Subtractions:

- LB Charlie Anderson
- SS Michael Boulware
- LB Danny Clark
- DB Von Hutchins
- WR Jerome Mathis
- TE Jeb Putzier
- C Mike Flanagan
- C Steve McKinney
- LB Shawn Barber
- OT Jordan Black

=== Draft ===
2008 Houston Texans draft
Round	Pick	Player	Position	College	Notes
1	26	Duane Brown *	OT	Virginia Tech	
3	79	Antwaun Molden	CB	Western Kentucky	
3	89	Steve Slaton	RB	West Virginia	
4	118	Xavier Adibi	LB	Virginia Tech	
5	151	Frank Okam	DT	Texas	
6	173	Dominique Barber	WR	Minnesota	from Baltimore
7	223	Alex Brink	QB	Washington State	
Made roster † Pro Football Hall of Fame * Made at least one Pro Bowl during career

The Texans had seven selections in the 2008 NFL draft. The Texans originally had five before the draft after having traded their second round selection to the Atlanta Falcons to land quarterback Matt Schaub and their sixth-round pick to the Denver Broncos for center Chris Myers. The Texans traded their first-round pick with the Baltimore Ravens for their third and sixth-round selections along with their first-round pick.

== Staff ==
2008 Houston Texans staff
Front office: Founder, chairman and chief executive officer – Bob McNair; Vice chairman – Philip Burguières; Vice chairman – D. Cal McNair; General manager – Rick Smith; President – Jamey Rootes; Director of pro personnel – Brian Gardner; Associate director of pro personnel – Bobby Grier; Director of college scouting – Dale Strahm; Coordinator of college scouting – Mike Maccagnan; Head coaches: Head coach – Gary Kubiak; Assistant head coach/offense – Alex Gibbs; Special assistant to the head coach – Bob Karmelowicz; Offensive coaches: Offensive coordinator/quarterbacks – Kyle Shanahan; Running backs – Chick Harris; Wide receivers – Larry Kirksey; Tight ends – Brian Pariani; Offensive line – John Benton; Assistant offensive line – Frank Pollack; Offensive assistant – Matt LaFleur; Offensive assistant – Mike McDaniel	Defensive coaches: Defensive coordinator – Richard Smith; Defensive line – Jethro Franklin; Linebackers – Johnny Holland; Defensive backs – Jon Hoke; Assistant defensive backs – Ray Rhodes; Senior defensive assistant – Frank Bush; Defensive assistant – Perry Carter; Defensive assistant – Robert Saleh; Special teams coaches: Special teams – Joe Marciano; Special teams assistant – Richard Hightower; Strength and conditioning: Head strength and conditioning – Dan Riley; Assistant strength and conditioning – Ray Wright

== Roster ==
2008 Houston Texans roster
Quarterbacks (QB): 18 Sage Rosenfels; 8 Matt Schaub; Running backs (RB): 44 Vonta Leach FB; 21 Ryan Moats KR; 33 Cecil Sapp; 20 Steve Slaton; Wide receivers (WR): 89 David Anderson; 11 André Davis KR; 84 Darnell Jenkins; 80 Andre Johnson; 12 Jacoby Jones KR/PR; 83 Kevin Walter; Tight ends (TE): 87 Mark Bruener; 81 Owen Daniels; 85 Joel Dreessen	Offensive linemen (OL): 65 Mike Brisiel G; 76 Duane Brown T; 78 Rashad Butler T; 55 Chris Myers C; 69 Chester Pitts G; 74 Ephraim Salaam T; 64 Kasey Studdard G; 63 Chris White C; 73 Eric Winston T; Defensive linemen (DL): 93 Tim Bulman DE/DT; 99 Travis Johnson DT; 72 Jesse Nading DE; 97 Frank Okam DT; 91 Amobi Okoye DT; 66 DelJuan Robinson DT; 98 Anthony Weaver DE; 90 Mario Williams DE; 92 Jeff Zgonina DT	Linebackers (LB): 52 Xavier Adibi OLB; 57 Kevin Bentley OLB; 53 Kevis Coley MLB; 56 Morlon Greenwood OLB; 59 DeMeco Ryans MLB; 51 Chaun Thompson OLB; Defensive backs (DB): 34 Dominique Barber SS; 32 Fred Bennett CB; 47 Will Demps FS; 38 DeMarcus Faggins CB; 25 Nick Ferguson SS; 31 Brandon Harrison SS; 36 David Pittman CB; 35 Jacques Reeves CB; 27 Matterral Richardson CB; 23 Dunta Robinson CB; 26 Eugene Wilson FS; Special teams (ST): 3 Kris Brown K; 82 Clark Harris LS; 1 Matt Turk P	Practice squad: 94 Dan Bazuin DE; 10 Alex Brink QB; 39 A. J. Davis CB; 67 Gabe Long DT; 77 Anthony Oakley G/T; 13 Mark Simmons WR; 79 Adam Stenavich G/T; 37 Darius Walker RB; Reserve: 24 C.C. Brown S (IR); 22 Chris Brown RB (IR); 96 Earl Cochran DE/DT (IR); 54 Zac Diles LB (IR); 30 Ahman Green RB (IR); 62 Scott Jackson C/G (IR); 95 Stanley McClover DE (IR); 28 Antwaun Molden CB (IR); 48 Bryan Pittman LS (Susp.); 68 Dan Stevenson C/G (IR); 86 Harry Williams WR (IR); 41 Jimmy Williams CB (IR); Rookies in italics, 8 practice squad

== Schedule ==
=== Preseason ===
Week	Date	Opponent	Result	Record	Venue	Recap
1	August 9	Denver Broncos	**W** 19–16	1–0	Reliant Stadium	Recap
2	August 16	at New Orleans Saints	**W** 31–27	2–0	Louisiana Superdome	Recap
3	August 22	at Dallas Cowboys	**L** 22–23	2–1	Texas Stadium	Recap
4	August 28	Tampa Bay Buccaneers	**L** 6–16	2–2	Reliant Stadium	Recap

=== Regular season ===
Week	Date	Opponent	Result	Record	Venue	Recap
1	September 7	at Pittsburgh Steelers	**L** 17–38	0–1	Heinz Field	Recap
2	Bye (Note: The Ravens-Texans game was postponed due to Hurricane Ike. The NFL moved the game from September 14 to November 9 (Week 10), which was to have been the Ravens' bye week, and also moved the Bengals-Texans game from November 9 to October 26 (Week 8), which was the original bye week for both of those teams. The Texans' bye week was therefore moved to Week 2)					
3	September 21	at **Tennessee Titans**	**L** 12–31	0–2	LP Field	Recap
4	September 28	at **Jacksonville Jaguars**	**L** 27–30 (OT)	0–3	Jacksonville Municipal Stadium	Recap
5	October 5	**Indianapolis Colts**	**L** 27–31	0–4	Reliant Stadium	Recap
6	October 12	Miami Dolphins	**W** 29–28	1–4	Reliant Stadium	Recap
7	October 19	Detroit Lions	**W** 28–21	2–4	Reliant Stadium	Recap
8	October 26	Cincinnati Bengals	**W** 35–6	3–4	Reliant Stadium	Recap
9	November 2	at Minnesota Vikings	**L** 21–28	3–5	Hubert H. Humphrey Metrodome	Recap
10	November 9	Baltimore Ravens	**L** 13–41	3–6	Reliant Stadium	Recap
11	November 16	at **Indianapolis Colts**	**L** 27–33	3–7	Lucas Oil Stadium	Recap
12	November 23	at Cleveland Browns	**W** 16–6	4–7	Cleveland Browns Stadium	Recap
13	December 1	**Jacksonville Jaguars**	**W** 30–17	5–7	Reliant Stadium	Recap
14	December 7	at Green Bay Packers	**W** 24–21	6–7	Lambeau Field	Recap
15	December 14	**Tennessee Titans**	**W** 13–12	7–7	Reliant Stadium	Recap
16	December 21	at Oakland Raiders	**L** 16–27	7–8	Oakland–Alameda County Coliseum	Recap
17	December 28	Chicago Bears	**W** 31–24	8–8	Reliant Stadium	Recap

Note: Intra-division opponents are in bold text.

== Standings ==
AFC South
	W	L	T	PCT	DIV	CONF	PF	PA	STK
^{(1)} Tennessee Titans	13	3	0	.813	4–2	9–3	375	234	L1
^{(5)} Indianapolis Colts	12	4	0	.750	4–2	10–2	377	298	W9
Houston Texans	8	8	0	.500	2–4	5–7	366	394	W1
Jacksonville Jaguars	5	11	0	.313	2–4	3–9	302	367	L2

== Regular season results ==
=== Week 1: at Pittsburgh Steelers ===
Quarter	1	2	3	4	Total
Texans	0	3	0	14	17
Steelers	7	14	14	3	38

at Heinz Field, Pittsburgh, Pennsylvania

- Game time: 1:00 PM EDT/12:00 PM CDT
- Game weather: 73 °F (23 °C) (Mostly Cloudy)
- Game attendance: 64,001
- Referee: Terry McAulay
- TV announcers (CBS): Gus Johnson & Randy Cross

The Texans began their 2008 campaign on the road against the Pittsburgh Steelers. In the first quarter, Houston trailed early as Steelers RB Willie Parker got a 7-yard TD run. In the second quarter, the Texans continued to trail as Parker got a 13-yard TD run, while QB Ben Roethlisberger completed a 13-yard TD pass to WR Hines Ward. Houston ended the half with kicker Kris Brown getting a 34-yard field goal. In the third quarter, the Texans continued to trail as Parker got a 4-yard TD run, while Roethlisberger and Ward hooked up with each other again on a 16-yard TD pass. In the fourth quarter, Houston replied with QB Matt Schaub completing a 14-yard TD pass to WR Kevin Walter. Pittsburgh responded with kicker Jeff Reed nailing a 44-yard field goal. The Texans closed out the scoring with a game with a 4-yard TD run by Schaub.

With the loss, Houston began its season at 0–1.

=== Week 2: Bye Week ===
The Texans were originally scheduled to play the Baltimore Ravens in Week 2, but due to structural damage to Reliant Stadium by Hurricane Ike, the game was postponed until Week 10. This allowed both Houston and Baltimore to take their bye week.

=== Week 3: at Tennessee Titans ===
Quarter	1	2	3	4	Total
Texans	6	6	0	0	12
Titans	7	14	3	7	31

at LP Field, Nashville, Tennessee

- Game time: 1:00 PM EDT/12:00 PM CDT
- Game weather: 80 °F (27 °C) (Sunny)
- Game attendance: 69,143
- Referee: Jerome Boger
- TV announcers (CBS): Kevin Harlan & Rich Gannon

Coming off their unexpected bye week, the Texans flew to LP Field for a Week 3 AFC South duel with the Tennessee Titans. In the first quarter, Houston struck first with kicker Kris Brown getting a 44-yard field goal. The Titans responded with RB LenDale White getting a 2-yard TD run. The Texans answered with Brown kicking a 24-yard field goal. In the second quarter, Tennessee increased its lead with QB Kerry Collins completing a 9-yard TD pass to TE Bo Scaife. The Texans answered with rookie RB Steve Slaton getting a 6-yard TD run, but the PAT failed. The Titans closed out the first half scoring with White's 1-yard TD run.

In the third quarter, Tennessee added onto its lead with kicker Rob Bironas nailing a 44-yard field goal. In the fourth quarter, the Titans sealed the win with CB Cortland Finnegan returning an interception 99 yards for a touchdown.

With the loss, Houston fell to 0–2.

=== Week 4: at Jacksonville Jaguars ===
Quarter	1	2	3	4	OT	Total
Texans	3	7	7	10	0	27
Jaguars	7	3	7	10	3	30

at Jacksonville Municipal Stadium, Jacksonville, Florida

- Game time: 1:00 PM EDT/12:00 PM CDT
- Game weather: 82 °F (28 °C) (Partly Cloudy)
- Game attendance: 64,061
- Referee: John Parry
- TV announcers (CBS): Dick Enberg & Randy Cross

Still searching for their first win of the year, the Texans flew to Jacksonville Municipal Stadium for a Week 4 AFC South duel with the Jacksonville Jaguars. In the first quarter, Houston trailed early as Jaguars FB Montell Owens took a fake punt and ran 41 yards for a touchdown. The Texans got on the board with kicker Kris Brown getting a 27-yard field goal. In the second quarter, Houston took the lead as QB Matt Schaub completed a 30-yard TD pass to rookie RB Steve Slaton. Jacksonville ended the half with kicker Josh Scobee getting a 46-yard field goal.

In the third quarter, the Jaguars retook the lead with QB David Garrard completing a 16-yard TD pass to WR Matt Jones. The Texans tied the game with Schaub completing a 5-yard TD pass to WR Kevin Walter. In the fourth quarter, Jacksonville responded with Scobee's 40-yard field goal. Houston retook the lead with Schaub hooking up with Walter again on an 8-yard TD pass. However, the Jaguars got the lead again as Garrard got a 5-yard TD run. The Texans tied game on Brown's 47-yard field goal. However, in overtime, Jacksonville sealed Houston's fate as Scobee nailed the game-winning 37-yard field goal.

With the loss, the Texans fell to 0–3.

=== Week 5: vs. Indianapolis Colts ===
Quarter	1	2	3	4	Total
Colts	10	0	0	21	31
Texans	0	17	3	7	27

at Reliant Stadium, Houston, Texas

- Game time: 1:00 PM EDT/12:00 PM CDT
- Game weather: 82 °F (28 °C) (Partly Cloudy/Roof Open)
- Game attendance: 70,118
- Referee: Tony Corrente
- TV announcers (CBS): Greg Gumbel & Dan Dierdorf

Hoping to rebound from their divisional road loss to the Jaguars, the Texans finally got to play their home opener as they played a Week 5 AFC South duel with the Indianapolis Colts. Due to an illness, QB Matt Schaub was unable to play, allowing backup QB Sage Rosenfels to get the start.

In the first quarter, Houston trailed early as Colts kicker Adam Vinatieri got a 46-yard field goal, along with RB Joseph Addai getting a 1-yard TD run. In the second quarter, the Texans responded with rookie RB Steve Slaton getting a 1-yard TD run, kicker Kris Brown getting a 37-yard field goal, and Rosenfels completing a 5-yard TD pass to WR Andre Johnson. In the third quarter, Houston increased its lead with Brown nailing a 43-yard field goal. In the fourth quarter, the Texans continued its run with Slaton getting a 1-yard TD run, expanding their lead to 17 points. What followed went into the NFL history books, as Sage Rosenfels fumbled twice and threw two interceptions to blow the biggest lead inside of 5 minutes in NFL history. The key play was known as the 'Rosencopter' play, when on third-and-eight, Rosenfels opted to try to hurdle a defender rather than sliding short of the first down. Gary Brackett recovered the fumble for a 58-yard touchdown, and Rosenfels was never the same afterwards, turning the ball over twice more. With the disappointing loss, Houston fell to 0–4.

=== Week 6: vs. Miami Dolphins ===
Quarter	1	2	3	4	Total
Dolphins	7	7	7	7	28
Texans	3	10	7	9	29

at Reliant Stadium, Houston, Texas

- Game time: 1:00 PM EDT/12:00 PM CDT
- Game weather: 79 °F (26 °C) (Cloudy/Roof Open)
- Game attendance: 70,023
- Referee: Ed Hochuli
- TV announcers (CBS): Ian Eagle & Solomon Wilcots

Coming off a heartbreaking home loss to the Colts, the Texans stayed at home for a Week 6 duel with the Miami Dolphins. In the first quarter, Houston trailed early as Dolphins QB Chad Pennington completed a 53-yard TD pass to RB Patrick Cobbs. The Texans responded with kicker Kris Brown getting a 27-yard field goal. In the second quarter, Miami added onto its lead as Pennington completed an 80-yard TD pass to Cobbs. Houston answered with Brown kicking a 33-yard field goal and WR Jacoby Jones returning a punt 70 yards for a touchdown.

In the third quarter, the Texans took the lead with QB Matt Schaub completing a 12-yar TD pass to WR Andre Johnson, but the Dolphins replied with RB Ricky Williams getting a 5-yard TD run. In the fourth quarter, Houston regained the lead as Brown got a 42-yard field goal, yet Miami struck back RB Ronnie Brown got a 6-yard TD run. The Texans got the last laugh as Schaub got the game-winning 3-yard TD run (with a failed 2-point conversion).

With the thrilling win, Houston won its first game of the season and improved to 1–4.

=== Week 7: vs. Detroit Lions ===
Quarter	1	2	3	4	Total
Lions	0	3	7	11	21
Texans	14	7	7	0	28

at Reliant Stadium, Houston, Texas

- Game time: 4:05 PM EDT/3:05 PM CDT
- Game weather: 77 °F (25 °C) (Clear/Roof Open)
- Game attendance: 70,081
- Referee: Bill Carollo
- TV announcers (Fox): Chris Rose, J.C. Pearson, & Nischelle Turner

Coming off their last-second win over the Dolphins, the Texans continued their home stand with a Week 7 interconference duel with the winless Detroit Lions. In the first quarter, Houston drew first blood as QB Matt Schaub completed a 2-yard TD pass to TE Owen Daniels, along with RB Ahman Green getting a 1-yard TD run. In the second quarter, the Texans increased their lead as rookie RB Steve Slaton got a 1-yard TD run. The Lions responded with kicker Jason Hanson getting a 54-yard field goal.

In the third quarter, Detroit tried to catch up as RB Kevin Smith got a 26-yard TD run. Houston answered with Schaub hooking up with Daniels again on a 1-yard TD pass. In the fourth quarter, the Lions tried to rally as QB Dan Orlovsky completed a 96-yard TD pass to WR Calvin Johnson, along with Hanson nailing a 54-yard field goal. The Texans' defense stiffened for the victory.

With the win, Houston improved to 2–4.

=== Week 8: vs. Cincinnati Bengals ===
Quarter	1	2	3	4	Total
Bengals	3	3	0	0	6
Texans	7	7	14	7	35

at Reliant Stadium, Houston, Texas

- Game time: 4:05 PM EDT/3:05 PM CDT
- Game weather: 82 °F (28 °C) (Clear/Roof Open)
- Game attendance: 70,112
- Referee: Ron Winter
- TV announcers (CBS): Gus Johnson & Steve Tasker

Coming off their win over the Lions, the Texans closed out their four-game home stand against the winless Cincinnati Bengals. In the first quarter, Houston drew first blood as WR Jacoby Jones returned a punt 73 yards for a touchdown. The Bengals responded with kicker Shayne Graham getting a 43-yard field goal. The Texans increased their lead as QB Matt Schaub completed a 6-yard TD pass to WR David Anderson. Cincinnati closed out the half as Graham nailed a 32-yard field goal.

In the third quarter, Houston began to pull away as Schaub completed a 7-yard and a 39-yard TD pass to WR Kevin Walter. In the fourth quarter, the Texans closed out their home stand in style with rookie RB Steve Slaton getting a 20-yard TD run.

With the win, not only did Houston improve to 3–4, but they won three straight games for the first time in franchise history.

=== Week 9: at Minnesota Vikings ===
Quarter	1	2	3	4	Total
Texans	7	0	7	7	21
Vikings	7	14	0	7	28

at Hubert H. Humphrey Metrodome, Minneapolis, Minnesota

- Game time: 1:00 PM EST/12:00 PM CST
- Game weather: Indoor (Domed Stadium)
- Game attendance: 62,839
- Referee: Walt Coleman
- TV announcers (CBS): Dick Enberg & Randy Cross

Coming off their home win over the Bengals, the Texans flew to the Hubert H. Humphrey Metrodome for a Week 9 interconference duel with the Minnesota Vikings. In the first quarter, Houston trailed early as Vikings RB Adrian Peterson got a 1-yard TD run. The Texans responded with CB Jacques Reeves returning an interception 44 yards for a touchdown. In the second quarter, Minnesota answered with QB Gus Frerotte completing an 8-yard TD pass to WR Sidney Rice and a 49-yard TD pass to WR Bernard Berrian.

In the third quarter, Houston tried to rally as QB Sage Rosenfels completed a 3-yard TD pass to WR David Anderson. In the fourth quarter, the Vikings replied with Frerotte completing a 25-yard TD pass to TE Visanthe Shiancoe. The Texans tried to come back as Rosenfels completed a 14-yard TD pass to WR Andre Johnson. However, the Vikings' defense stiffened for the win.

With the loss, Houston fell to 3–5.

QB Matt Schaub (21/29 for 224 yards and 1 interception), who started the game, left after the first half with a sprained left knee.

=== Week 10: vs. Baltimore Ravens ===
Quarter	1	2	3	4	Total
Ravens	7	5	7	22	41
Texans	0	6	7	0	13

at Reliant Stadium, Houston, Texas

- Game time: 1:00 PM EST/12:00 PM CST
- Game weather: 69 °F (21 °C) (Sunny/Roof Open)
- Game attendance: 70,552
- Referee: Jerome Boger
- TV announcers (CBS): Ian Eagle & Solomon Wilcots

Hoping to rebound from their road loss to the Vikings, the Texans went home for a Week 10 duel with the Baltimore Ravens. Both teams were supposed to play each other in Week 2, but Hurricane Ike forced them to reschedule their game to this week.

With QB Matt Schaub out with an injury, back-up QB Sage Rosenfels was given the start.

In the first quarter, Houston trailed early as Ravens QB Joe Flacco completed a 43-yard TD pass to WR Yamon Figurs. In the second quarter, the Texans responded with kicker Kris Brown getting a 23-yard field goal. Baltimore answered on a Houston blunder, as rookie OT Duane Brown committed a holding penalty in his own end zone, giving the Ravens a safety. Baltimore added onto their lead as kicker Steven Hauschka got a 54-yard field goal. The Texans closed out the half with Brown nailing a 48-yard field goal.

In the third quarter, the Ravens increased their lead as RB Willis McGahee got a 1-yard TD run. Houston responded as Rosenfels completed a 60-yard TD pass to WR Kevin Walter. However, in the fourth quarter, Baltimore greatly pulled away as Flacco completed a 1-yard TD pass to TE Todd Heap (with a 2-point conversion pass to WR Derrick Mason), QB Troy Smith completed a 14-yard TD pass to Heap, and McGahee getting a 4-yard TD run.

With the loss, the Texans fell to 3–6.

=== Week 11: at Indianapolis Colts ===
Quarter	1	2	3	4	Total
Texans	6	7	7	7	27
Colts	3	6	14	10	33

at Lucas Oil Stadium, Indianapolis, Indiana

- Game time: 1:00 PM EST/12:00 PM CST
- Game weather: Indoor (Roof Closed)
- Game attendance: 66,201
- Referee: Carl Cheffers
- TV announcers (CBS): Gus Johnson & Steve Tasker

Trying to snap a two-game losing streak and avenge their Week 5 collapse, the Texans flew to Lucas Oil Stadium for a Week 11 AFC South rematch with the Indianapolis Colts. In the first quarter, Houston struck first as kicker Kris Brown got a 28-yard field goal. The Colts responded with kicker Adam Vinatieri getting a 40-yard field goal. The Texans answered with Brown making a 34-yard field goal. In the second quarter, Indianapolis tied the game with Vinatieri getting a 39-yard field goal. Houston replied with RB Ahman Green getting a 1-yard TD run. The Colts closed out the half with Vinatieri making a 32-yard field goal.

In the third quarter, Indianapolis got the lead as QB Peyton Manning completed a 23-yard TD pass to RB Joseph Addai. The Texans regained the lead as rookie RB Steve Slaton getting a 71-yard TD run. The Colts answered with Addai getting a 7-yard TD run. In the fourth quarter, Indianapolis increased their lead as Manning completed a 10-yard TD pass to WR Marvin Harrison. Houston tried to come back as Green got a 2-yard TD run, but the Colts pulled away as Vinatieri nailed a 31-yard field goal.

With the loss, the Texans fell to 3–7.

=== Week 12: at Cleveland Browns ===
Quarter	1	2	3	4	Total
Texans	7	6	3	0	16
Browns	0	6	0	0	6

at Cleveland Browns Stadium, Cleveland, Ohio

- Game time: 1:00 PM EST/12:00 PM CST
- Game weather: 30 °F (−1 °C) (Sunny)
- Game attendance: 72,077
- Referee: Ed Hochuli
- TV announcers (CBS): Kevin Harlan & Rich Gannon

Trying to snap a three-game losing streak, the Texans flew to Cleveland Browns Stadium for a Week 12 duel with the Cleveland Browns. In the first quarter, Houston drew first blood as QB Sage Rosenfels completed a 17-yard TD pass to WR Kevin Walter. In the second quarter, the Texans increased their lead as kicker Kris Brown got a 31-yard field goal. The Browns responded with kicker Phil Dawson getting a pair of 32-yard field goals. Houston ended the half with Brown making a 31-yard field goal. In the third quarter, the Texans continued their dominance as Brown nailed a 36-yard field goal. From there on out, Houston's defense kept Cleveland's offense in check.

With the win, not only did the Texans improve to 4–7, but they finally got their first road win of the season.

=== Week 13: vs. Jacksonville Jaguars ===
Quarter	1	2	3	4	Total
Jaguars	0	0	3	14	17
Texans	10	0	6	14	30

at Reliant Stadium, Houston, Texas

- Game time: 8:30 PM EST/7:30 PM CST
- Game weather: 53 °F (12 °C) (Clear/Roof Open)
- Game attendance: 70,809
- Referee: Scott Green
- TV announcers (ESPN): Mike Tirico, Ron Jaworski, & Tony Kornheiser

Coming off their road win over the Browns, the Texans went home, donned their "Battle Red" uniforms, and played in their very first Monday Night Football game in franchise history, as they played a Week 13 AFC South rematch with the Jacksonville Jaguars.

In the first quarter, Houston drew first blood as QB Sage Rosenfels completed a 31-yard TD pass to WR Andre Johnson, while kicker Kris Brown got a 38-yard field goal. After a scoreless second quarter, the Texans increased their lead early in the third quarter as Brown got a 50-yard field goal. The Jaguars responded with kicker Josh Scobee getting a 29-yard field goal, yet Houston answered with Brown nailing a 20-yard field goal. In the fourth quarter, Houston began to pull away as rookie RB Steve Slaton got a 7-yard TD run. Jacksonville answered with RB Fred Taylor getting a 4-yard TD run, yet the Texans immediately replied as Slaton got a 40-yard TD run. The Jaguars close out the scoring with QB David Garrard completing an 18-yard TD pass to WR Reggie Williams.

With the win, Houston improved to 5–7.

This was the first time that Houston hosted a football game on Monday night in 14 years. The last Monday night game that was held in Houston was on November 21, 1994, in the Houston Astrodome when the Houston Oilers were defeated by the New York Giants 13–10.

=== Week 14: at Green Bay Packers ===
Quarter	1	2	3	4	Total
Texans	7	3	3	11	24
Packers	0	7	0	14	21

at Lambeau Field, Green Bay, Wisconsin

- Game time: 1:00 PM EST/12:00 PM CST
- Game weather: 3 °F (−16 °C) (Mostly Cloudy)
- Game attendance: 70,245
- Referee: Peter Morelli
- TV announcers (CBS): Gus Johnson & Steve Tasker

With their MNF home win over the Jaguars fresh in their minds, the Texans flew to Lambeau Field for a Week 14 interconference duel with the Green Bay Packers. Houston shot early in the first quarter as QB Matt Schaub completed a 58-yard TD pass to wide receiver Kevin Walter. The Packers responded in the second quarter with QB Aaron Rodgers completing a 20-yard touchdown pass to TE Donald Lee, yet the Texans closed out the half with a 30-yard field goal from kicker Kris Brown.

Houston got the third quarter's only points as Brown got a 41-yard field goal. Green Bay answered in the fourth quarter as RB Ryan Grant got a 6-yard touchdown run, yet the Texans replied with Schaub completing an 11-yard touchdown pass and a 2-point conversion pass to wide receiver Andre Johnson. The Packers tied the game as Rodgers completed a 9-yard touchdown pass to wide receiver Jordy Nelson. Houston got the last laugh as Brown nailed the game-winning 40-yard field goal.

With the win, the Texans improved to 6–7.

=== Week 15: vs. Tennessee Titans ===
Quarter	1	2	3	4	Total
Titans	3	3	3	3	12
Texans	0	10	0	3	13

at Reliant Stadium, Houston, Texas

- Game time: 1:00 PM EST/12:00 PM CST
- Game weather: 72 °F (22 °C) (Partly Cloudy/Roof Open)
- Game attendance: 70,831
- Referee: Gene Steratore
- TV announcers (CBS): Gus Johnson & Steve Tasker

With the win, the Texans improved to 7–7. This was their second four-game winning streak in history, and their first all in one season.

=== Week 16: at Oakland Raiders ===
Quarter	1	2	3	4	Total
Texans	7	6	0	3	16
Raiders	13	0	14	0	27

at Oakland–Alameda County Coliseum, Oakland, California

- Game time: 4:05 PM EST/3:05 PM CST
- Game weather: 48 °F (9 °C) (Cloudy & Light Rain)
- Game attendance: 43,687
- Referee: Bill Carollo
- TV announcers (CBS): Bill Macatee & Steve Beuerlein

Coming off their divisional upset win at home over the Titans, the Texans flew to Oakland–Alameda County Coliseum for a Week 16 duel with the Oakland Raiders. Houston trailed early in the first quarter as Raiders quarterback JaMarcus Russell completed a 20-yard touchdown pass to wide receiver Chaz Schilens. The Texans responded with fullback Vonta Leach's 1-yard touchdown run. However, Oakland responded with kicker Sebastian Janikowski getting a 33-yard and a 30-yard field goal. Houston tied the game in the second quarter as kicker Kris Brown got a 53-yard and a 24-yard field goal.

In the third quarter, the Raiders scored two unanswered touchdowns: wide receiver Johnnie Lee Higgins caught a 29-yard touchdown pass from Russell, followed by an 80-yard punt return for a touchdown. The Texans tried to come back in the fourth quarter: Brown nailed a 40-yard field goal, but that was too little, too late.

With the loss, Houston fell to 7–8.

=== Week 17: vs. Chicago Bears ===
Quarter	1	2	3	4	Total
Bears	10	0	7	7	24
Texans	0	14	7	10	31

at Reliant Stadium, Houston, Texas

- Game time: 1:00 PM EST/12:00 PM CST
- Game weather: 49 °F (9 °C) (Cloudy & Light Rain/Roof Open)
- Game attendance: 70,838
- Referee: Carl Cheffers
- TV announcers (Fox): Matt Vasgersian, J.C. Pearson, & Nischelle Turner

Hoping to end their season on a high note, the Texans closed out their season at home in a Week 17 interconference duel with the Chicago Bears. Houston trailed early in the first quarter as Bears quarterback Kyle Orton completed a 4-yard touchdown pass to wide receiver Brandon Lloyd, followed by a 37-yard field goal from kicker Robbie Gould. The Texans responded and took the lead as quarterback Matt Schaub a 43-yard and a 3-yard touchdown pass to wide receiver Andre Johnson.

In the third quarter, Houston added onto their lead with running back Ryan Moats scoring a touchdown on a 2-yard run. Chicago answered with Orton completing a 1-yard touchdown pass to tight end Greg Olsen. In the fourth quarter, the Texans pulled away as kicker Kris Brown nailed a 22-yard field goal, followed by rookie running back Steve Slaton's 2-yard touchdown run. The Bears tried to come back as Orton got a 1-yard touchdown run, but Houston's defense stiffened for the victory.

With the win, the Texans closed out their season at 8–8.

== Statistics ==
=== Team ===
Category	Total yards	Yards per game	NFL rank (out of 32)
Passing offense	4,267	266.7	4th
Rushing offense	1,846	115.4	13th
Total offense	6,113	382.1	3rd
Passing defense	3,423	213.9	17th
Rushing defense	1,962	122.6	23rd
Total defense	5,385	336.6	22nd

=== Individual ===
Category	Player	Total
Offense
Passing yards	Matt Schaub	3,043
Passing touchdowns	Matt Schaub	15
Rushing yards	Steve Slaton	1,282
Rushing touchdowns	Steve Slaton	9
Receiving yards	Andre Johnson	1,575
Receiving touchdowns	Andre Johnson	8
Defense
Tackles (Solo)	DeMeco Ryans	86
Sacks	Mario Williams	12
Interceptions	Jacques Reeves	4
