= Matt Schaub =

American football player and coach (born 1981)

- Schaub with the Houston Texans in 2010

Arizona Cardinals
- Title: Quarterbacks coach

Personal information
- Born: June 25, 1981 (age 45); Pittsburgh, Pennsylvania, U.S.
- Listed height: 6 ft 6 in (1.98 m)
- Listed weight: 245 lb (111 kg)

Career information
- Position: Quarterback (No. 8)
- High school: West Chester East (West Chester, Pennsylvania)
- College: Virginia (1999–2003)
- NFL draft: 2004: 3rd round, 90th overall pick

Career history

Playing
- Atlanta Falcons (2004–2006); Houston Texans (2007–2013); Oakland Raiders (2014); Baltimore Ravens (2015); Atlanta Falcons (2016–2020)

Coaching
- Atlanta Falcons (2023) Football analyst; Arizona Cardinals (2026–present) Quarterbacks coach

Awards and highlights
- 2× Pro Bowl (2009, 2012); NFL passing yards leader (2009); ACC Player of the Year (2002); ACC Offensive Player of the Year (2002); First-team All-ACC (2002); Second-team All-ACC (2003); Virginia Cavaliers Jersey No. 7 retired

Career NFL statistics
- Passing attempts: 3,348
- Passing completions: 2,148
- Completion percentage: 64.2%
- TD–INT: 136–91
- Passing yards: 25,467
- Passer rating: 89.5
- Stats at Pro Football Reference

Matthew Rutledge Schaub (SHOB; born June 25, 1981) is an American professional football coach and former quarterback who is the quarterbacks coach for the Arizona Cardinals of the National Football League (NFL). He played college football for the Virginia Cavaliers and was selected by the Atlanta Falcons in the third round of the 2004 NFL draft.

After spending his first three professional seasons with the Atlanta Falcons as a backup, Schaub was traded to the Houston Texans in 2007, where he spent the next seven seasons as a starter and was selected to two Pro Bowls. He then had stints as a backup with the Oakland Raiders and Baltimore Ravens in 2014 and 2015, respectively. He then returned to the Falcons in 2016, where he remained a backup for his final five seasons in the NFL. Schaub began his NFL coaching career in 2023 an analyst for the Atlanta Falcons and was hired by the Cardinals as their quarterbacks coach in 2026.

== Early life ==
Schaub attended West Chester East High School in West Chester, Pennsylvania, where he lettered in football, basketball, and baseball.

== College career ==
Schaub enrolled at the University of Virginia in the fall of 1999, and began his career as a member of the Virginia Cavaliers football team. He redshirted his true freshman season. In 2000, starter Dan Ellis missed some time due to an injury, but fellow redshirt freshman Bryson Spinner received the bulk of playing time in relief. After the 2000 season, coach George Welsh retired and was replaced by Al Groh. Schaub was the starter for the first game of the 2001 season at the Wisconsin Badgers. Over the 2001 season, Schaub and Spinner split quarterbacking duties nearly evenly. The two alternated in some games, while in others either Schaub or Spinner received nearly all the snaps. The two quarterback system worked relatively well with both effectively passing the ball to receiver Billy McMullen, the team's leading offensive threat. Schaub finished the season with 1,524 passing yards, 10 touchdowns, and eight interceptions.

Spinner transferred to the University of Richmond for the 2002 season, seemingly making Schaub the unquestioned starter. However, Schaub was briefly replaced by redshirt freshman Marques Hagans in the first game of the 2002 season against the Colorado State Rams. Hagans was named the starter for the next game, against the Florida State Seminoles, but was replaced by Schaub who went on to his breakout season. He finished the season with 2,976 passing yards, 28 touchdowns, and seven interceptions. Schaub was the 2002 ACC Player of the Year, 2002 ACC Offensive Player of the Year and first-team All-State Virginia Sports Information Directors Association (VaSID) as a senior. Publicized in the 2003 preseason as a Heisman Trophy candidate, Schaub suffered a shoulder injury in the first game of the season and did not return for several games; therefore his overall numbers declined in his senior season. He finished the season with 2,952 passing yards, 18 touchdowns, and 10 interceptions. He was the Most Valuable Player of the 2003 Continental Tire Bowl and was twice selected to the All-ACC Academic Football Team. His University of Virginia awards included the John Acree Memorial Trophy, given to the football player with the highest qualities of leadership and unselfish service, and the Ben Wilson Award as the team's most outstanding offensive player.

Schaub finished his college career with at least 22 school records. He played in a record 40 games at the quarterback position and finished his career as one of the most accurate passers in Atlantic Coast Conference history (.670 career completion percentage). His Virginia statistics included school career records for yards passing (7,502), touchdown passes (56), completions (716), attempts (1,069), completion percentage (.670), 300-yard games (8), and 200-yard games (20).

== Professional career ==
Pre-draft measurables
Height	Weight	Arm length	Hand span	40-yard dash	10-yard split	20-yard split	20-yard shuttle	Three-cone drill	Vertical jump	Broad jump	Wonderlic
6 ft 5 5/8 in (1.97 m)	243 lb (110 kg)	31 3/8 in (0.80 m)	9 3/8 in (0.24 m)	5.00 s	1.77 s	2.94 s	4.62 s	7.65 s	30.5 in (0.77 m)	9 ft 2 in (2.79 m)	31
All values from NFL Combine

=== Atlanta Falcons (first stint) ===
Schaub was selected by the Atlanta Falcons in the third round of the 2004 NFL draft as the 90th overall pick. He was the fifth of seventeen quarterbacks taken in a quarterback-rich class, including Eli Manning, Philip Rivers, and Ben Roethlisberger.

==== 2004 season ====
In 2004, Schaub played in six games with the Atlanta Falcons, including starting the Week 16 contest against the New Orleans Saints, replacing the injured Michael Vick.

==== 2005 season ====
In 2005, Schaub was named the Most Valuable Player in the American Bowl preseason game in Tokyo, Japan. In front of 45,203 fans at the Tokyo Dome, Schaub completed 11 of 13 passes for 117 yards and two touchdowns in a 27–21 comeback victory over the Indianapolis Colts. During the regular season, he played quarterback in five games, starting one. His lone start came against the New England Patriots in Week 5; Schaub threw for 298 yards and three touchdowns in the 31–28 loss. Schaub was the holder on extra points and field goals.

==== 2006 season ====
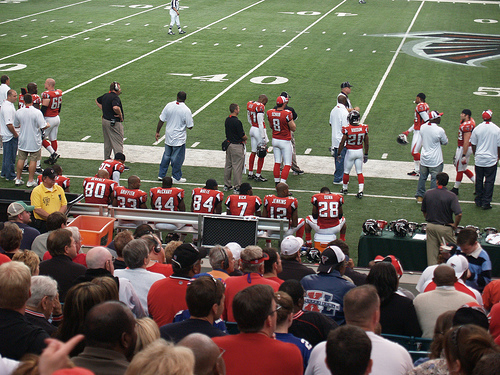
Schaub (#8) in a game against the New York Giants, 2006

In 2006, Schaub again was the holder on extra points and field goals. On the season, he finished with 208 passing yards, one touchdown, and two interceptions.

=== Houston Texans ===
On March 8, 2007, the Houston Texans acquired Schaub from the Falcons for second-round picks in 2007 and 2008. As part of the deal, the teams also swapped first-round picks in 2007, exchanging the Falcons' 10th pick with the Texans' 8th pick. Schaub was introduced to his new team at a press conference on March 22, 2007, and the same day, the Texans released David Carr, opening the door for Schaub to become their long-term starter.

==== 2007 season ====
In each of the first two games of the 2007 season, Schaub threw for over 220 yards, a 71% completion percentage, and attained a quarterback rating of over 100; both games were victories for the Texans, winning 20–3 over the Kansas City Chiefs and 34–21 over the Carolina Panthers. The second victory marked the first 2–0 start in franchise history. In Week 4, he started against his former team, the Atlanta Falcons, in which he completed 28 of 40 attempts, with 317 yards and one touchdown in what would be his second loss of the 2007 season.

Though Schaub was plagued with injuries throughout the 2007 season, he and backup quarterback Sage Rosenfels improved on the team's 2006 record of 6–10, bringing the Texans to their first .500 season in franchise history with an 8–8 record in the team's short history.

==== 2008 season ====
Schaub returned as the starter for the 2008 season. He did not perform well in the first two games, losing to the Pittsburgh Steelers and Tennessee Titans but then had a great game against the Jacksonville Jaguars despite another loss. He sat out the Week 5 loss to the Indianapolis Colts. In Week 6, Schaub set the Texans franchise record for passing yards with 379 in a comeback win against the Miami Dolphins in which Schaub scored the winning touchdown on a quarterback draw with 3 seconds left. Schaub helped teammate wide receiver Andre Johnson lead the league in both receptions and receiving yards through Week 8 of the season, having 56 catches for 772 yards. The new quarterback-receiver tandem had their best day together through mid-season during the Week 8 matchup against the Cincinnati Bengals where Schaub threw for 280 yards, completing over 85% of his passes (24 of 28), 10 of those going to Johnson for 143 yards in the 35–6 rout. Schaub's season was broken up however with a knee injury against the Minnesota Vikings, which expected to keep him out for around four weeks, making Sage Rosenfels the new starter.

Against the Green Bay Packers in Week 14, Schaub recorded 414 yards and two touchdowns, also leading the Texans down the field to set up a Kris Brown game-winning field goal. He earned AFC Offensive Player of the Week honors for his game against the Packers. He played well down the stretch and the team finished 8–8 for the second consecutive season despite starting 0–4.

==== 2009 season ====
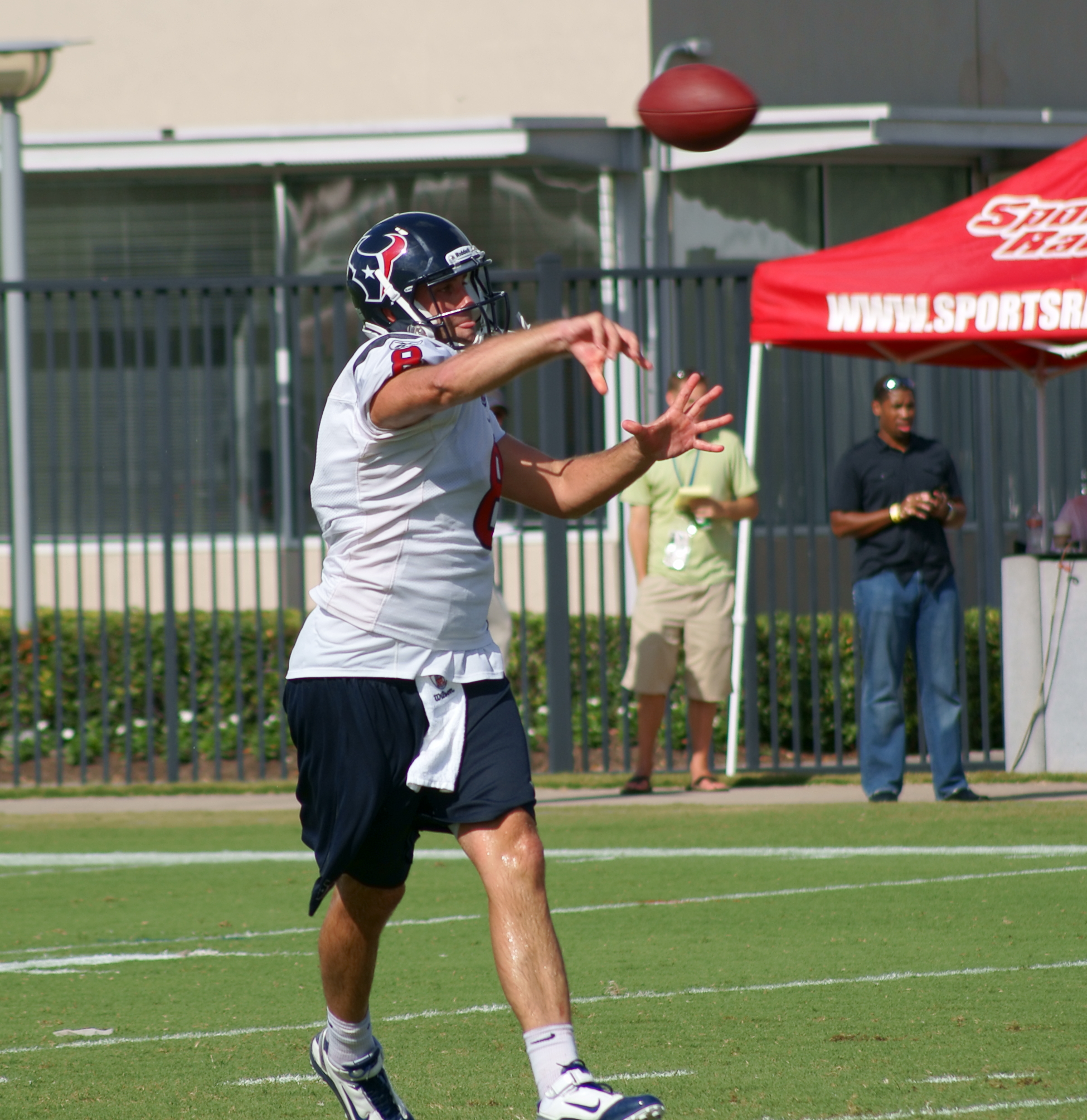
Schaub during Texans practice.

In Week 2, against the Tennessee Titans, Schaub had 357 passing yards and four touchdowns in a 34–31 victory. He earned AFC Offensive Player of the Week for his game against the Titans. On October 18, against the Cincinnati Bengals, he had 392 passing yards, four touchdowns, and an interception in the 28–17 victory. During the 2009 NFL season, he led the Texans to a 9–7 record, the first winning record in team history. He led the league in passing yards (4,770), completions (396), yards per game (298), and passing attempts (583), while finishing fifth in touchdowns (29), compiling a quarterback rating of 98.6. He had nine games reaching at least 300 passing yards. He was selected to his first Pro Bowl as an injury replacement to Patriots quarterback Tom Brady, winning MVP honors.

==== 2010 season ====
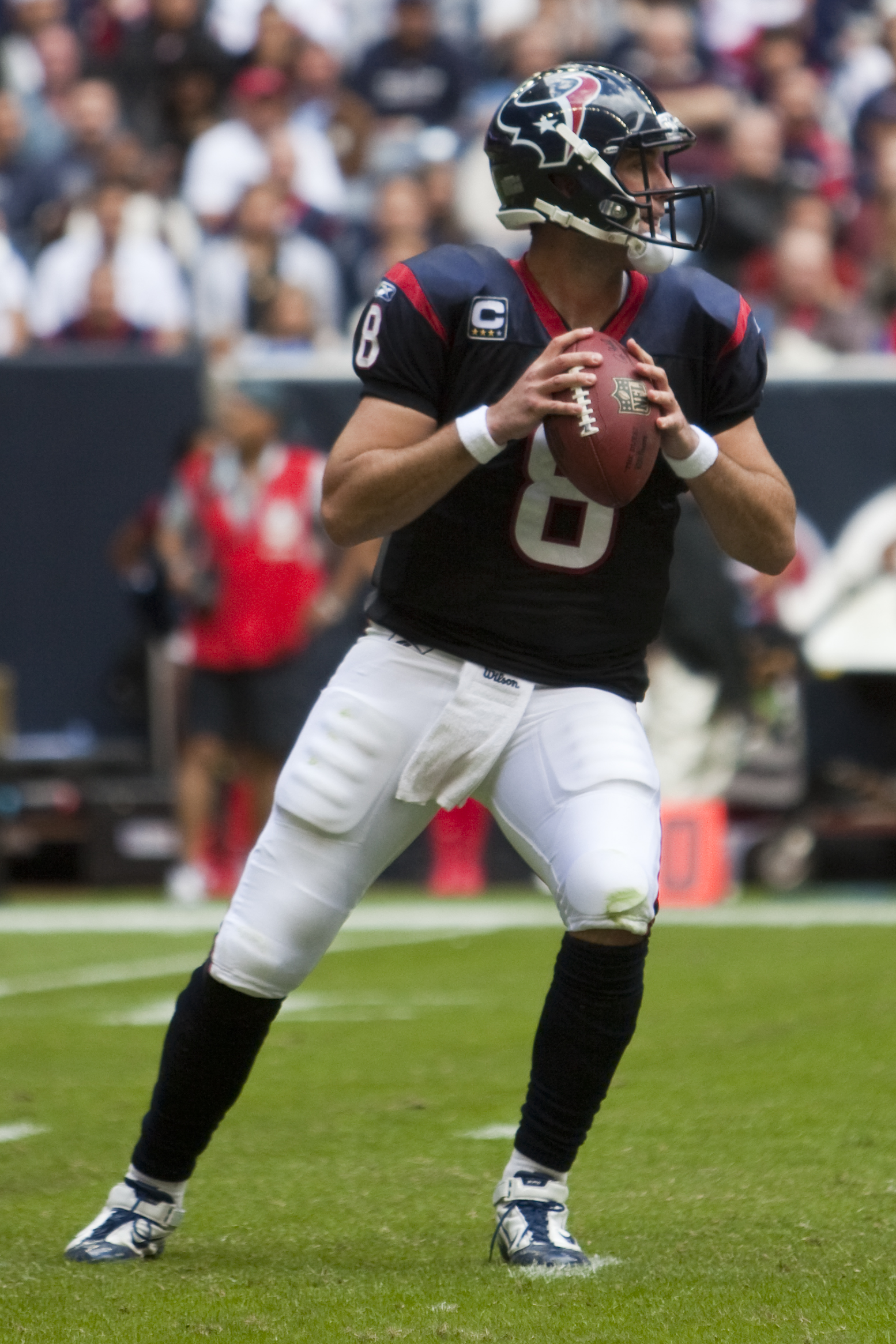
Schaub in a game against the Dallas Cowboys, 2010

There were high hopes for the Texans with the league's passing yards leader coming back for the 2010 year, but with the development of the running game, Schaub passed for 107 yards for a touchdown and an interception in a Week 1 victory against the Indianapolis Colts. Hopes for strong start to the season were rejuvenated when Schaub threw for 497 yards in an overtime victory over the Washington Redskins on September 19, 2010. In Week 6, Schaub earned AFC Offensive Player of the Week for his efficient game against the Kansas City Chiefs in a 35–31 victory. Schaub finished the season with 4,370 passing yards, good for fourth in the league, but the team finished 6–10 and missed the playoffs.

==== 2011 season ====
In 2011, the Texans made numerous defensive improvements as Schaub led the Texans to its most successful season to date, helping guide his team part of the way to their first ever playoff appearance and clinching the first division title in Texans franchise history. Schaub started all 10 of the first regular season games, and while not on pace for one of his better seasons statistically, he helped his team reach a 7–3 record, the best start after 10 weeks in franchise history. After a Week 10 game versus the Tampa Bay Buccaneers, Schaub was placed on IR with a Lisfranc injury to his right foot after a quarterback sneak. Schaub was initially replaced by Matt Leinart, who would go on to get knocked out for the season as well, leading to the eventual replacement by rookie T. J. Yates. The team finished 4–4 (including their playoff games) without Schaub as the starting quarterback.

==== 2012 season ====
Schaub entered the 2012 season in the final year of the contract he signed when he initially joined the Texans back in 2007.

After the season opening 30–10 win against the Miami Dolphins, Schaub signed a four-year, $62 million extension with the Texans, keeping him under contract through 2016.

During the Week 3 game against the Denver Broncos, Schaub was illegally hit by Broncos defender Joe Mays and was thought to have lost part of his earlobe on the play, however he suffered only a laceration.

In Week 11 against the Jacksonville Jaguars, Schaub threw for a career-high 527 yards and a career-high five touchdown passes in a 43–37 overtime victory for the Texans. Schaub's 527 yards is tied with Hall of Famer and former Houston Oilers quarterback Warren Moon for the second-most passing yards in a single game in NFL history, only behind Norm Van Brocklin's 554 yards passing in 1951 against the already defunct Boston Yanks. He earned AFC Offensive Player of the Week for his game against the Jaguars.

In Week 12, during the Thanksgiving game against the Detroit Lions, Schaub was kicked in the groin by Ndamukong Suh. Schaub rallied the Texans from a 10-point deficit to win once again in overtime, 34–31. After the game, Schaub said that he wouldn't want Suh on his team, calling him "not Houston Texan-worthy." Schaub finished the 2012 season with 4,008 passing yards, 22 touchdowns, and 12 interceptions.

Schaub was invited to the 2013 Pro Bowl. The Texans were tied with the San Francisco 49ers for most players invited.

Schaub helped lead the Texans to a 12–4 record and a spot in the postseason. In the Wild Card Round against the Cincinnati Bengals, Schaub had 262 passing yards and an interception in the 19–13 victory. In the Divisional Round against the New England Patriots, he had 343 passing yards, two touchdowns, and one interception in the 41–28 loss.

==== 2013 season ====
During the 2013 NFL draft, the Texans upgraded Schaub's receiving weapons with the selection of DeAndre Hopkins in the first round.

Schaub began the season against the San Diego Chargers. Down 28–7 early in the 3rd quarter, Schaub led the largest comeback in Texans' franchise history with a 31–28 victory. Schaub finished the game with 346 passing yards, three touchdowns, and an interception.

The next week against the Tennessee Titans, Schaub again had to rally the Texans to a comeback victory. He finished the day with 298 passing yards, three touchdowns (including the game-winner to rookie DeAndre Hopkins) and two interceptions in the Texans' 30–24 overtime victory.

The next two weeks saw Schaub throw three interceptions, including two interceptions returned for touchdowns. In the following week against the San Francisco 49ers, Schaub threw three interceptions, including a pick-six on his first pass attempt of the game. With that pick-six, Schaub had thrown a pick-six in four consecutive games, an NFL record. Local social media began tag lines such as, "Houston, we have a Schaublem!" In Week 6 against the St. Louis Rams, Schaub was injured during the game, but his replacement T. J. Yates threw another pick-6 to stretch the team total to five games. Despite recovering from an injured ankle, Schaub was benched in Week 7 in favor of Case Keenum. Keenum started for the remainder of the season until he suffered a thumb injury, and Schaub became the starter in Weeks 16 and 17. For the 2013 season, Schaub played in 10 games with 2,310 passing yards, 10 touchdowns, and 14 interceptions.

=== Oakland Raiders ===
On March 21, 2014, the Oakland Raiders traded their 2014 sixth round draft pick to the Texans in exchange for Schaub. He was benched to start the season in favor of rookie quarterback Derek Carr.

On October 26, 2014, Schaub made his first pass attempt as a Raider in the regular season against the Cleveland Browns. It was a botched fake field goal that ended in an interception. Schaub was released by the team on March 16, 2015.

=== Baltimore Ravens ===
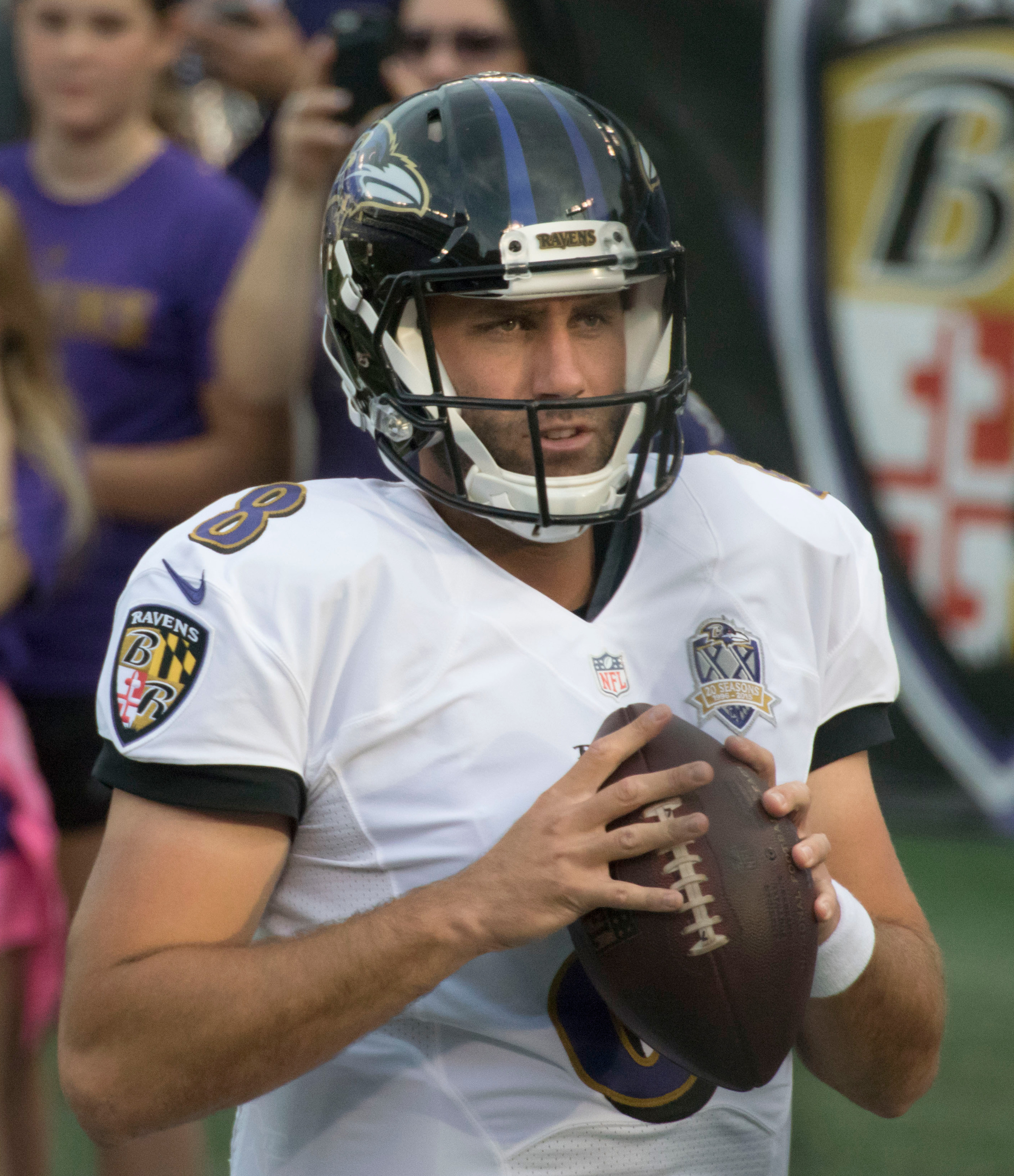
Schaub with the Baltimore Ravens

On March 31, 2015, Schaub signed with the Baltimore Ravens to be the back-up quarterback. His contract was for one-year, $2 million guaranteed and a $1 million signing bonus. Schaub was named the Ravens' starting quarterback for the rest of the 2015 season after Joe Flacco suffered a season-ending injury by tearing his ACL and MCL during a Week 11 victory over the St. Louis Rams. On November 30 against the Cleveland Browns, Schaub started his first game since his tenure with Houston. He had a relatively good performance, throwing for 232 yards and two touchdowns, with ten yards rushing, despite another pick-six and a second interception with 56 seconds left in the game. The Ravens ended up winning after defensive end Brent Urban blocked Travis Coons's attempt at the game winning field goal and it was returned by safety Will Hill for a walk-off touchdown, giving Schaub his first win in over two years. Schaub threw for 308 yards and a 41-yard touchdown the following week, but also had another pair of interceptions, one of which was again returned for a touchdown, in the 15–13 loss to Miami. On December 13, after battling a chest injury, Schaub was replaced by Jimmy Clausen as the starter. Schaub finished his stint with the Ravens starting only two games with a 1–1 record, throwing 540 yards, three touchdowns, and four interceptions.

=== Atlanta Falcons (second stint) ===
On March 8, 2016, Schaub signed a one-year contract with the Atlanta Falcons worth $2,750,000 with $500,000 guaranteed.

==== 2016 season ====
Schaub (right) with Ryan (left) during Falcons training camp, 2016

In the 2016 season, Schaub backed up Matt Ryan in Atlanta's successful season. The Falcons won the NFC Championship, and earned a trip to Super Bowl LI. Schaub appeared in four games in 2016, with a total of 16 passing yards.

==== 2017 season ====
On March 8, 2017, Schaub signed a two-year, $9 million contract extension with the Falcons. However, he did not appear in any games in the 2017 season.

==== 2018 season ====
In the 2018 season, he remained as the Falcons' main backup quarterback. In Week 5, a 41–17 loss to the Pittsburgh Steelers, he was 5-of-7 for 20 yards in relief of Matt Ryan.

==== 2019 season ====
On October 27, 2019, Schaub made his first start as a Falcon since 2005, due to Ryan being inactive with an ankle injury. Schaub finished the Week 8 contest with 460 passing yards, one touchdown, and one interception as the Falcons lost, 27–20, to the Seattle Seahawks. Despite the loss, Schaub's 460 yards passing were the second most passing yards in a single game by a Falcon all-time, the most ever allowed by the Seahawks against an opposing quarterback, and his 39 pass completions set a Falcons franchise record.

==== 2020 season and retirement ====
On January 4, 2021, Falcons owner Arthur Blank announced that Schaub was retiring from the NFL after 17 seasons, eight of them having been with the Falcons.

== Career statistics ==
=== NFL ===
Legend
	Led the league
**Bold**	Career high

==== Regular season ====
Year	Team	Games			Passing								Rushing				Sacks		Fumbles	
Year	Team	GP	GS	Record	Cmp	Att	Pct	Yds	Avg	TD	Int	Rtg	Att	Yds	Avg	TD	Sck	SckY	Fum	Lost
2004	ATL	6	1	0–1	33	70	47.1	330	4.7	1	4	42.0	8	26	3.3	0	4	14	1	0
2005	ATL	**16**	1	0–1	33	64	51.6	495	7.7	4	0	98.1	9	**76**	**8.4**	0	6	27	1	1
2006	ATL	**16**	0	—	18	27	66.7	208	7.7	1	2	71.2	7	21	3.0	0	2	8	1	0
2007	HOU	11	11	4–7	192	289	66.4	2,241	7.8	9	9	83.2	17	52	3.1	0	16	126	7	3
2008	HOU	11	11	6–5	251	380	66.1	3,043	8.0	15	10	92.7	31	68	2.2	**2**	23	149	**10**	**4**
2009	HOU	**16**	**16**	9–7	**396**	**583**	67.9	**4,770**	8.2	**29**	**15**	98.6	**48**	57	1.2	0	25	149	3	2
2010	HOU	**16**	**16**	6–10	365	574	63.6	4,370	7.6	24	12	92.0	22	28	1.3	0	**32**	**226**	9	3
2011	HOU	10	10	7–3	178	292	61.0	2,479	8.5	15	6	96.8	15	9	0.6	**2**	16	98	3	1
2012	HOU	**16**	**16**	**12–4**	350	544	64.3	4,008	7.4	22	12	90.7	21	−9	−0.4	0	27	216	4	0
2013	HOU	10	8	2–6	219	358	61.2	2,310	6.5	10	14	73.0	5	24	4.8	0	21	162	2	1
2014	OAK	11	0	—	5	10	50.0	57	5.7	0	2	27.9	0	0	0.0	0	3	24	3	1
2015	BAL	2	2	1–1	52	80	65.0	540	6.8	3	4	76.0	4	10	2.5	0	3	27	0	0
2016	ATL	4	0	—	1	3	33.3	16	5.3	0	0	52.1	2	−2	−1.0	0	0	0	0	0
2017	ATL	0	0	—	Did not play															
2018	ATL	3	0	—	5	7	71.4	20	2.9	0	0	74.1	1	0	0.0	0	0	0	1	0
2019	ATL	6	1	0–1	50	67	**74.6**	580	**8.7**	3	1	**109.0**	3	−3	−1.0	0	2	19	1	1
2020	ATL	1	0	—	0	0	0.0	0	0.0	0	0	0.0	3	−4	−1.3	0	0	0	0	0
Career		155	93	47–46	2,148	3,348	64.2	25,467	7.6	136	91	89.5	196	353	1.8	4	180	1,245	46	17

==== Postseason ====
Year	Team	Games			Passing								Rushing				Sacks		Fumbles	
Year	Team	GP	GS	Record	Cmp	Att	Pct	Yds	Avg	TD	Int	Rtg	Att	Yds	Avg	TD	Sck	SckY	Fum	Lost
2004	ATL	0	0	—	Did not play															
2011	HOU	0	0	—	Did not play due to injury															
2012	HOU	2	2	1–1	63	89	70.9	605	6.7	2	2	87.5	5	2	0.4	0	1	9	1	0
2016	ATL	0	0	—	Did not play															
2017	ATL	0	0	—	Did not play															
Career		2	2	1–1	63	89	70.9	605	6.7	2	2	87.5	5	2	0.4	0	1	9	1	0

=== College ===
Season	Team	Conf	Class	Pos	GP	Passing								
Season	Team	Conf	Class	Pos	GP	Cmp	Att	Pct	Yds	Avg	AY/A	TD	Int	Rtg
2000	Virginia	ACC	FR	QB	3	7	8	87.5	50	6.3	0.6	0	1	115.0
2001	Virginia	ACC	SO	QB	12	140	240	58.3	1,524	6.4	5.7	10	8	118.8
2002	Virginia	ACC	JR	QB	14	288	418	68.9	2,976	7.1	7.7	28	7	147.5
2003	Virginia	ACC	SR	QB	11	281	403	69.7	2,952	7.3	7.1	18	10	141.0
Career					40	716	1,069	67.0	7,502	7.0	7.0	56	26	138.4

== Career highlights ==
=== Awards and honors ===
NFL

- 2× Pro Bowl selection (2009, 2012)
- Pro Bowl MVP (2009)
- NFL passing yards leader (2009)
- 4× AFC Offensive Player of the Week

College

- ACC Player of the Year (2002)
- ACC Offensive Player of the Year (2002)
- First-team All-ACC (2002)
- Second-team All-ACC (2003)
- Virginia Cavaliers Jersey No. 7 retired

=== Texans franchise records ===
- Most games played at quarterback – 90 (2007–2013)
- Most career wins – 46 (2007–2013)
- Most career pass completions – 1,951 (2007–2013)
- Most pass completions in a single season – 396 (2009)
- Most pass completions in a single game – 43 (November 18, 2012, vs. Jacksonville Jaguars)
- Most career pass attempts – 3,020 (2007–2013)
- Most pass attempts in a single season – 583 (2009)
- Most pass attempts in a game – 62 (December 13, 2010, vs. Baltimore Ravens)
- Most career passing yards – 23,221 (2007–2013)
- Most passing yards in a game – 527 (November 18, 2012, vs. Jacksonville Jaguars)
- Most 4,000 passing yard seasons, career – 3
- Most 3,000 passing yard seasons, career – 4
- Consecutive seasons, 4,000 yards passing – 2 (2009–2010)
- Consecutive seasons, 3,000 yards passing – 3 (2008–2010)
- Most 400+ yard passing games, career – 4
- Most 300+ yard passing games, career – 27
- Most 300+ yard passing games, season – 9 (2009)
- Consecutive passing 300+ yard games – 4 (2010)
- Most career passing touchdowns – 124 (2007–2013)
- Most career interceptions – 78 (2007–2013)
- Consecutive games with an interception returned for a touchdown – 4 (2013)
- Most career 4th quarter comeback wins – 11 (2007–2013)
- Most career game Winning drives – 14 (2007–2013)

== Coaching career ==
=== Atlanta Falcons ===
On August 2, 2023, the Atlanta Falcons signed Schaub to be a football analyst.

=== Arizona Cardinals ===
On February 12, 2026, Schaub was hired by the Arizona Cardinals to serve as the team's quarterbacks coach under new head coach Mike LaFleur.

== Personal life ==
=== Broadcasting ===
From 2024 to 2025, Schaub had been an analyst for Virginia Cavaliers football radio broadcasts.

=== NFLPA candidacy ===
On August 18, 2025, Schaub announced his candidacy for the NFL Players Association's executive director, saying the players should fight the owners by forming their own league.

== See also ==
- List of National Football League annual passing yards leaders
- List of NFL quarterbacks who have passed for 500 or more yards in a game
