= Kris Brown =

American football player (born 1976)

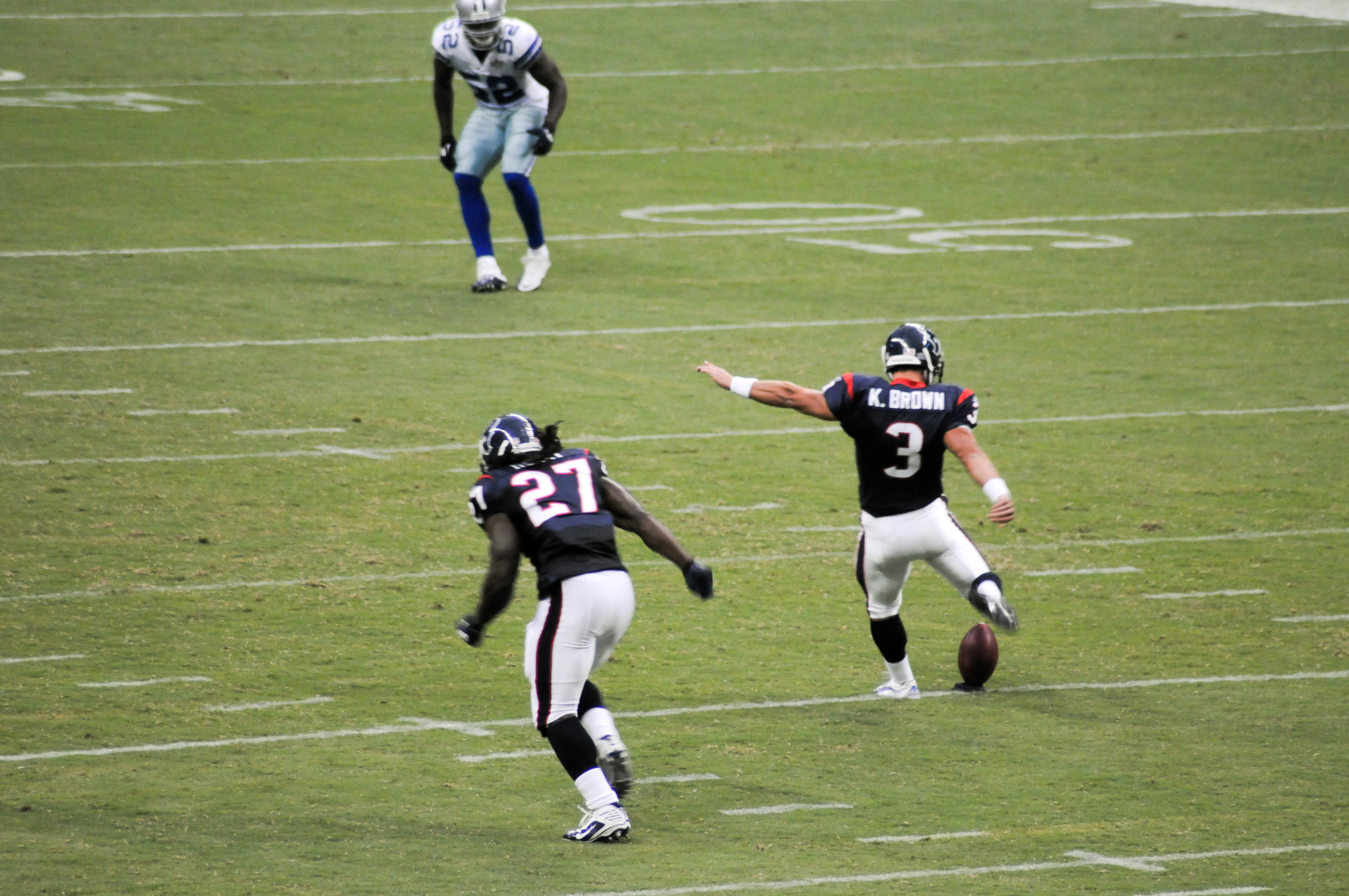
- Brown kicks off for Texans against Cowboys

No. 3, 2
- Position: Placekicker

Personal information
- Born: December 23, 1976 (age 49); Irving, Texas, U.S.
- Listed height: 5 ft 11 in (1.80 m)
- Listed weight: 211 lb (96 kg)

Career information
- High school: Southlake Carroll (Southlake, Texas)
- College: Nebraska
- NFL draft: 1999: 7th round, 228th overall pick

Career history
- Pittsburgh Steelers (1999–2001); Houston Texans (2002–2009); San Diego Chargers (2010); Dallas Cowboys (2010)

Awards and highlights
- All-Pro (2007); 2× National champion (1995, 1997); 2× Second-team All-Big 12 (1996, 1998)

Career NFL statistics
- Field goals: 256
- Field goal attempts: 331
- Field goal %: 77.3
- Longest field goal: 57
- Touchbacks: 87
- Stats at Pro Football Reference

Kristopher Clayton Brown (born December 23, 1976) is an American former professional football player who was a placekicker in the National Football League (NFL) for twelve seasons in the late 1990s and 2000s. He played college football for the Nebraska Cornhuskers, and was selected by the Pittsburgh Steelers in the seventh round of the 1999 NFL draft. In the first six years of his NFL career, he converted 132 of 173 field goals (76%) and scored 573 points. He was a key player for the expansion Houston Texans, being their placekicker for the entirety of the team's existence until 2010. He also played for the San Diego Chargers and Dallas Cowboys.

== Early life ==
Brown was a three-year starter at kicker and a two-year starter at quarterback for Carroll High School in Southlake, Texas. He led the Dragons to consecutive 16-0 records and Class 3A State Championships in 1992 and 1993, starting at quarterback on the 1993 team.

Brown served as captain of the Dragons as a senior and connected on 16-of-18 field goal attempts in 1994. He earned first-team all-district, All-Northeast Tarrant County honors and all-area honors as a kicker, as well as honorable-mention all-state honors from both the AP and the Texas Sportswriters Association. Brown was named an All-America kicker by Bluechip Illustrated and an All-Midlands region choice by SuperPrep in 1994.

In Carroll Senior High School's first ever 4A playoff game in 1994, Brown kicked four field goals, including a long of 50 yards, and the unranked Dragons defeated No. 2 Waxahachie, 26−23. The following week Brown was knocked out of the game in the first quarter with a concussion and Carroll was eliminated from the playoffs. The Dragons went 38−5 during Brown's tenure with the Dragons.

== College career ==
Brown was a four-year starter at kicker and won two national championships at the University of Nebraska–Lincoln. Brown broke numerous school records while playing for the Cornhuskers, including most career points (388), most field goals made (217), most consecutive field goals made (17), most PATs made (217), most consecutive PATs made (114), most points scored by kicking during a season (116) and career (388), most points scored by a freshman (97 in 1995), and most PATs made during a season without a miss (62 of 62 in 1997). Several of these records were later broken by former Philadelphia Eagles kicker, Alex Henery.

His younger brother, Drew Brown, followed in his footsteps by becoming the Nebraska's place kicker in 2014. Like his brother, he previously was the kicker for Southlake Carroll before his career with Nebraska.

== Professional career ==
=== Pittsburgh Steelers ===
Brown was selected in the seventh round (228th overall) of the 1999 NFL draft by the Pittsburgh Steelers. He saw action immediately in his rookie season leading the team in scoring with 105 points while seeing action in all 16 games of the regular season.

Brown remained with the Steelers through the 2001 season, but had a crucial field goal blocked in the AFC Championship game that was returned for a touchdown. Brown also struggled in the team's first season at Heinz Field, including missing 4 field goals in a 13−10 loss to the arch-rival Baltimore Ravens.

Following the 2001 season, Brown sought free agency and was granted the right to sign with another team. In 2002, Brown chose to sign with the newly formed Houston Texans as a restricted free agent. The Steelers chose not to match the Texans' offer, opting to initially go with Todd Peterson before selecting kicker Jeff Reed after Peterson was injured mid-season.

=== Houston Texans ===
Brown won the job as a placekicker for the Texans and held the position for the first eight years of the franchise's history. On Christmas Eve 2006, Brown nailed a 48-yard field goal as time expired to give the Texans their first-ever win over the Indianapolis Colts.

Brown kicked five field goals on October 7, 2007, against the Miami Dolphins at home, including the game-winner on a career-long 57-yarder with one second remaining. Brown set an NFL single-game record with three field goals of 54 yards or more, hitting two 54-yarders earlier in the game. Neil Rackers, Connor Barth, Morten Andersen, Sebastian Janikowski, Phil Dawson, Josh Scobee, Blair Walsh, Chris Boswell, and Tyler Bass are the only other kickers to kick three field goals of 50+ yards in a single game.

Brown was given an extension on June 16, 2009, worth $10 million over 4 years. It also included $2.5 million in guarantees.

Brown missed two game-tying field goals vs the Colts and Titans on Monday Night Football in week 9 and 11 of the 2009 season.

On September 3, 2010, Brown was released from the Texans after losing a training camp battle to Neil Rackers. Brown was the last remaining member of the inaugural 2002 team.

=== San Diego Chargers ===
Brown signed with the Chargers on October 20, 2010, after an injury to Nate Kaeding. On October 24, 2010, Brown kicked his first field goal as a San Diego Charger against the New England Patriots, later making his second field goal. With 27 seconds left in the game, he missed a 50-yard field goal which would have tied the game. It was the only one he missed out of 5 attempts in 3 games. Brown was cut on November 23.

=== Dallas Cowboys ===
On December 31, 2010, Brown was signed to a two-year contract by the Dallas Cowboys, who were looking for him to compete the next year with David Buehler for the kicker job, so he was declared inactive for the last game of the season against the Philadelphia Eagles. On July 28, 2011, he was released after the team decided to sign undrafted free agent Kai Forbath and not have to pay Brown's scheduled $911,000 salary.

== NFL career statistics ==
Year	Team	GP	Field goals				Extra points			Points
Year	Team	GP	FGA	FGM	Lng	Pct	XPA	XPM	Pct	Points
1999	PIT	16	29	25	51	86.2	31	30	96.8	105
2000	PIT	16	30	25	52	83.3	33	32	97.0	107
2001	PIT	16	44	30	55	68.2	37	34	91.9	124
2002	HOU	16	24	17	51	70.8	20	20	100.0	71
2003	HOU	16	22	18	50	81.8	27	27	100.0	81
2004	HOU	16	24	17	50	70.8	34	34	100.0	85
2005	HOU	16	34	26	53	76.5	24	24	100.0	102
2006	HOU	16	25	19	49	76.0	27	26	96.3	83
2007	HOU	16	29	25	57	86.2	40	40	100.0	115
2008	HOU	16	33	29	53	87.9	37	37	100.0	124
2009	HOU	16	32	21	56	65.6	44	43	97.7	106
2010	SD	3	5	4	36	80.0	8	8	100.0	20
Career		179	331	256	57	77.3	362	355	98.1	1,123

== Charity work ==
In August 2012, a report from The Kansas City Star mentioned that Brown's company, Savoreaux, Inc. was holding a job fair for his Dunkin Donuts locations that had recently opened. The report went on to state that Brown had retired from football.

== Personal life ==
Brown is co-owner and chief executive officer of the Berliner Group, a Dunkin' Donuts franchisee in Kansas City and Omaha.
