= Brandon Harrison =

American football player (born 1985)

No. 31, 27
- Position: Safety

Personal information
- Born: April 29, 1985 (age 41); Baton Rouge, Louisiana, U.S.
- Listed height: 6 ft 2 in (1.88 m)
- Listed weight: 215 lb (98 kg)

Career information
- High school: Catholic (Baton Rouge)
- College: Stanford
- NFL draft: 2007: 5th round, 144th overall pick

Career history
- Houston Texans (2007–2008); California Redwoods (2009)

Career NFL statistics
- Total tackles: 33
- Pass deflections: 1
- Stats at Pro Football Reference

Brandon Harrison (born April 29, 1985) is an American former professional football player who was a safety in the National Football League (NFL). He was selected by the Houston Texans in the fifth round of the 2007 NFL draft. He played college football for the Stanford Cardinal.

He also played for the California Redwoods.

== Professional career ==
=== Houston Texans ===
Harrison was selected by the Houston Texans in the fifth round, with the 144th overall pick, of the 2007 NFL draft. He officially signed with the team on July 23, 2007. He was placed on injured reserve on September 1, and did not play in any games in 2007. Harrison appeared in 15 games, starting six, during the 2008 season, recording 24 solo tackles, nine assisted tackles, and one pass breakup. He was waived by the Texans on September 5, 2009.

=== California Redwoods ===
Harrison was signed by the California Redwoods of the United Football League on October 19, 2009. He played in four games, starting two, for the Redwoods in 2009, totaling 18 tackles.
