= DelJuan Robinson =

American football player (born 1984)

No. 66
- Position: Defensive tackle

Personal information
- Born: July 1, 1984 (age 42); Memphis, Tennessee, U.S.
- Listed height: 6 ft 3 in (1.91 m)
- Listed weight: 303 lb (137 kg)

Career information
- High school: Hernando (Hernando, Mississippi)
- College: Mississippi State
- NFL draft: 2007: undrafted

Career history
- Houston Texans (2007–2010); Carolina Panthers (2011)*
- * Offseason or practice squad member only

Awards and highlights
- Second-team All-SEC (2006)

Career NFL statistics
- Total tackles: 31
- Forced fumbles: 1
- Stats at Pro Football Reference

DelJuan Cortez Robinson (born July 1, 1984) is an American former professional football player who was a defensive tackle in the National Football League (NFL). He played college football for the Mississippi State Bulldogs and was signed by the Houston Texans as an undrafted free agent in 2007.

Robinson was raised in Hernando, Mississippi, and played for their high school.
