= Kevis Coley =

American football player (born 1982)

No. 53
- Position: Linebacker

Personal information
- Born: June 23, 1982 (age 44); Palatka, Florida, U.S.
- Listed height: 6 ft 1 in (1.85 m)
- Listed weight: 228 lb (103 kg)

Career information
- High school: Palatka (FL)
- College: Southern Miss
- NFL draft: 2006: undrafted

Career history
- New York Giants (2006)*; Jacksonville Jaguars (2006–2007)*; Cincinnati Bengals (2007)*; Houston Texans (2007–2008)
- * Offseason or practice squad member only

Awards and highlights
- C-USA Defensive Player of the Year (2005)
- Stats at Pro Football Reference

Kevis Coley (born June 23, 1982) is an American former professional football linebacker. He was signed by the New York Giants as an undrafted free agent in 2006. He played college football at Southern Mississippi.

== Career ==
On May 14, 2006, the New York Giants signed Coley as an undrafted free agent after he went unselected in the 2006 NFL draft. Coley was also been a member of the Jacksonville Jaguars, Cincinnati Bengals, and Houston Texans.
