= Scott Jackson (American football) =

American football player (born 1979)

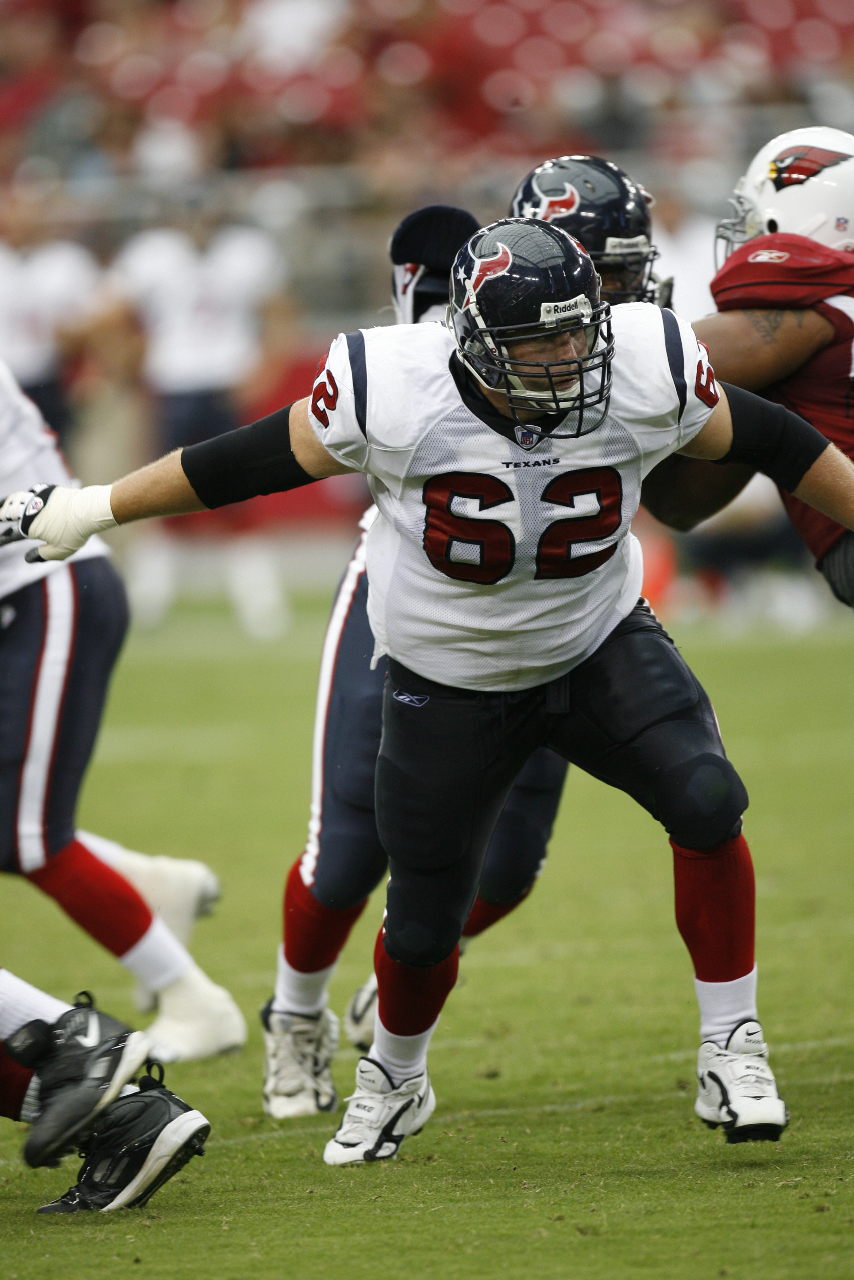
- Jackson with the Houston Texans in 2007

No. 62
- Positions: Offensive guard, center

Personal information
- Born: January 19, 1979 (age 47); Whittier, California, U.S.
- Listed height: 6 ft 5 in (1.96 m)
- Listed weight: 300 lb (136 kg)

Career information
- College: BYU
- NFL draft: 2004: undrafted

Career history
- Tampa Bay Buccaneers (2004–2006); Houston Texans (2006–2008)

Scott Jackson (born January 19, 1979) is an American former professional football player who was an offensive lineman in the National Football League (NFL). He was signed by the Tampa Bay Buccaneers as an undrafted free agent in 2004 after playing college football at Brigham Young University. Jackson was on the active rosters of both the Buccaneers and Houston Texans but never played in a regular season or postseason NFL game.

== Early life ==
Jackson was a star offensive lineman for Palos Verdes Peninsula High School in Rolling Hills Estates, California. A three-year letter winner, Jackson was named all-west, all-state, and Los Angeles Times Lineman of the Year as a senior. He graduated from Peninsula High School in 1997. He was heavily recruited by Stanford, USC, Cal, UCLA, Washington, and Colorado State ultimately choosing to accept a full scholarship to BYU.

== College career ==
Jackson redshirted his freshman year at Brigham Young University in 1997. After returning from a two-year mission for the Church of Jesus Christ of Latter-day Saints, Jackson started at center position. A broken fibula caused him to miss most of the 2000 season, and a knee injury cut his 2001 season short. During his junior year (2002), Jackson earning All-Mountain West Conference honors his senior season. At the 2004 NFL Scouting Combine, Jackson ran the 40-yard dash in 4.94 seconds, the fastest of any offensive lineman at the Combine.

== Professional career ==
=== Tampa Bay Buccaneers ===
Undrafted in the 2004 NFL draft, Jackson was signed by the Tampa Bay Buccaneers as a free agent. Jackson failed to make the active roster out of training camp, but was signed to the team's practice squad, where he remained the rest of the season.

In 2005, Jackson was again signed to the practice squad following training camp and promoted to the active roster after the fourth game. A backup to the guard and center positions, Jackson did not appear in a game.

In the 2006 preseason, Jackson showed impressive improvement over his earlier preseason form and earned public praise from Buccaneers head coach Jon Gruden; however, Jackson was again cut by Tampa Bay and signed to its practice squad. Before the first regular season game, however, injuries to other offensive linemen forced Jackson to be promoted to the active roster again, with the Buccaneers cutting former standout wide receiver David Boston to make room for him. Jackson saw no action and was cut within days to make room for a long snapper. Jackson was soon re-signed to the practice squad.

=== Houston Texans ===
A month later, Jackson was signed to the Houston Texans' active roster from Tampa Bay's practice squad. He finished the 2006 season on the Texans' active roster but did not see action in a regular season game. Jackson re-signed with the Texans on April 2, 2007. During 2007 training camp, a shoulder injury sidelined him on the Texans' injured reserve for the entire season. Jackson suffered a foot injury during the 2008 preseason and ended up missing the entire season for the second straight year. He became a free agent after the 2008 season, without ever having played in an NFL game.

== Personal life ==
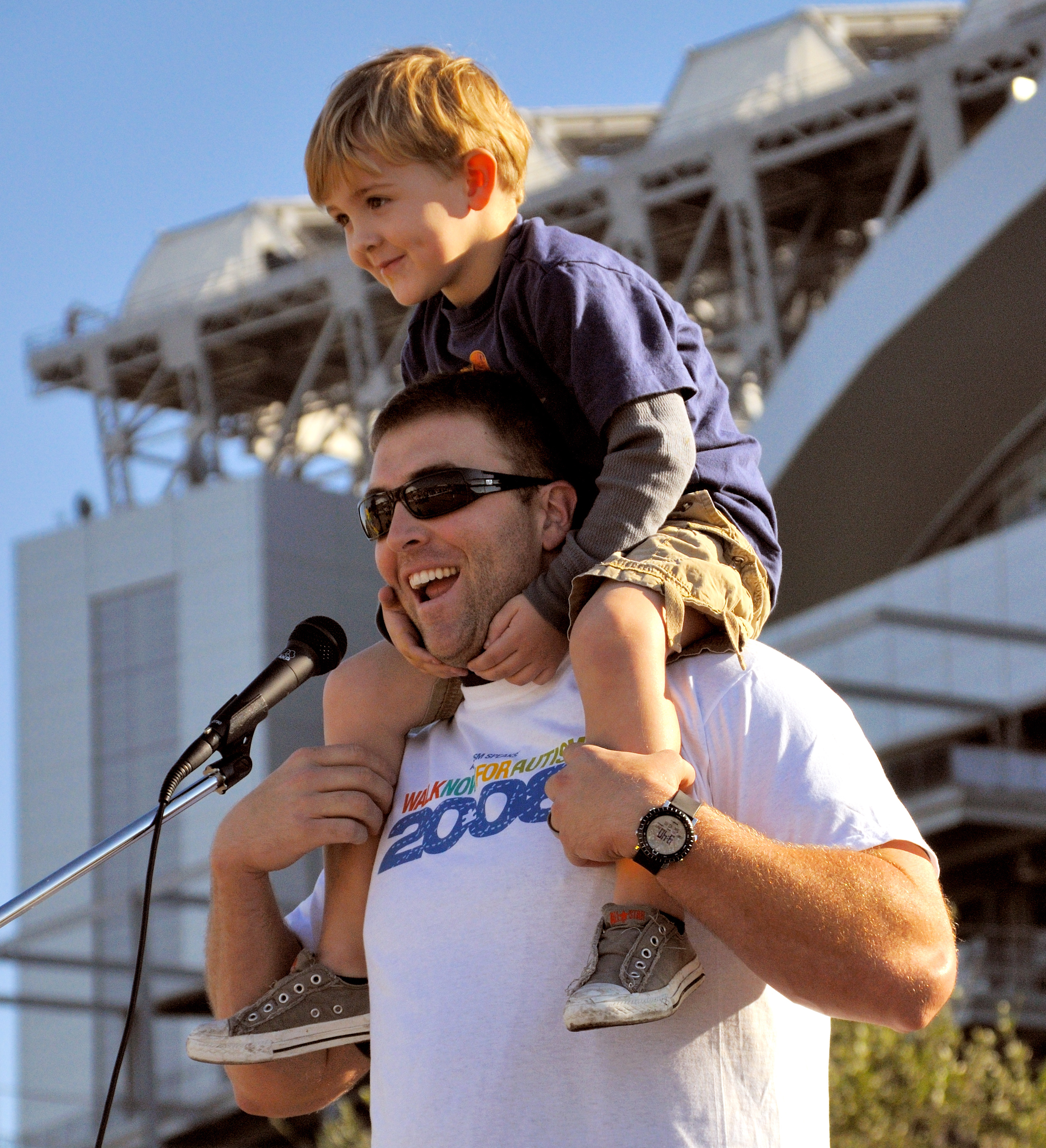
Jackson and his son Tyler at the 2008 Houston Walk Now for Autism.

Jackson served as a missionary for the Church of Jesus Christ of Latter-day Saints to the Spanish-speaking residents in the Dallas area in 1998 and 1999. He is an Eagle Scout. Scott married Ashley McKinnon of Winter Park, Florida in 2002. Together they have four boys.

== Education ==
During his time in the NFL, Jackson participated in several NFL Business Management and Entrepreneurial programs: Northwestern in 2005, Stanford in 2007 and Harvard in 2008. After retiring from the NFL, Jackson entered the Class of 2012 at the Darden Graduate School of Business Administration at the University of Virginia. Following graduation, Jackson accepted a position with Boston Consulting Group. He and his family currently live in Houston.
