= 2013 Houston Texans season =

12th season in franchise history

- Owner: Bob McNair
- General manager: Rick Smith
- Head coach: Gary Kubiak (fired on December 6, 2–11 record); Wade Phillips (Interim during Week 10 while Kubiak recovered from a mini-stroke; Interim from Weeks 15–17, 0–3 record)
- Offensive coordinator: Rick Dennison
- Defensive coordinator: Wade Phillips
- Home stadium: Reliant Stadium

Results
- Record: 2–14
- Division place: 4th AFC South
- Playoffs: Did not qualify
- Pro Bowlers: 3: OT Duane Brown; DE J. J. Watt; WR Andre Johnson

Uniform
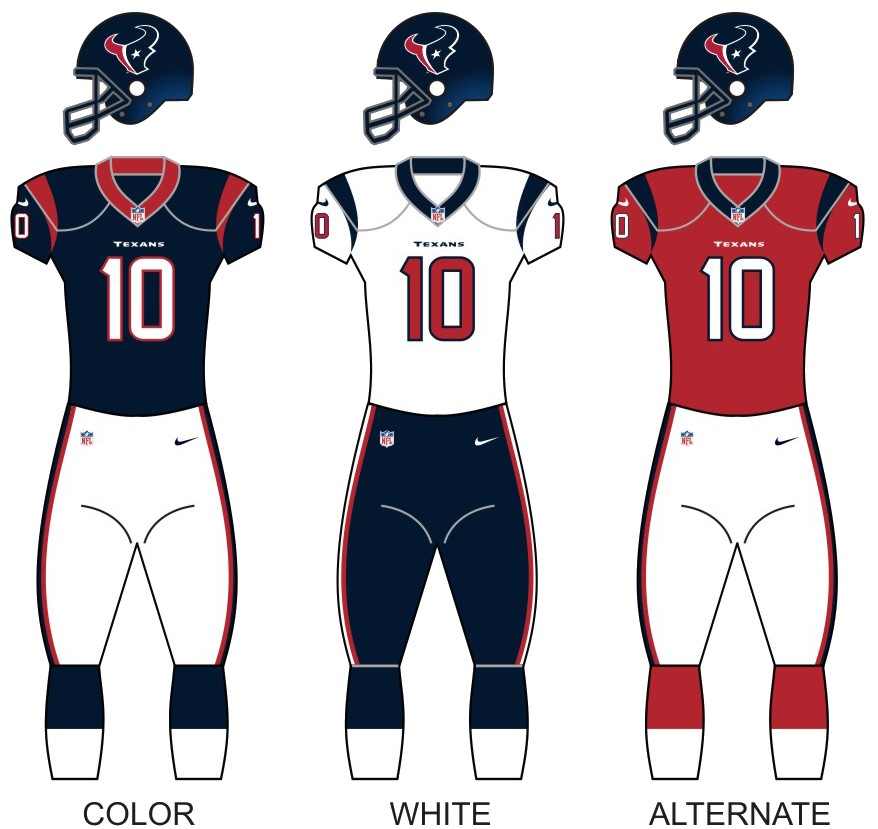

The 2013 season was the Houston Texans' 12th in the National Football League (NFL). They failed to improve upon their 12–4 record from 2012, suffering through a season-ending 14-game losing streak following a 2–0 start and missing the playoffs for the first time since 2010. Head coach Gary Kubiak was fired after eight seasons following their eleventh loss (Week 14 vs. the Jacksonville Jaguars). Defensive coordinator Wade Phillips was named the interim head coach for the final three games of the season. Out of the 14 games lost by the Texans this year, nine of them were by one score, marking a record amount of one-score losses for the franchise. Their 14-game losing streak is the worst in team history and their 2–14 record matched their 2005 losses for the most losses in franchise history. Coming off a franchise-best 12–4 record just the year before, the Texans tie a league record with Houston's previous team, the Oilers (who, coincidentally, also went 12–4 in 1993 and 2–14 in 1994) for the biggest season-to-season decline in win total. On January 3, 2014, claiming, "I'm ready to kick 2013 the hell out the door", Texans owner Bob McNair announced that former Penn State head coach Bill O'Brien would be the Texans' third head coach.

== 2013 draft class ==
2013 Houston Texans draft
Round	Pick	Player	Position	College	Notes
1	27	DeAndre Hopkins *	WR	Clemson	
2	57	D. J. Swearinger	FS	South Carolina	
3	89	Brennan Williams	OT	North Carolina	
3	95	Sam Montgomery	OLB	LSU	Compensatory
4	124	Trevardo Williams	OLB	Connecticut	
6	176	David Quessenberry	OT	San Jose State	Pick from OAK
6	195	Alan Bonner	WR	Jacksonville State	
6	198	Chris Jones	DT	Bowling Green	Pick from STL
6	201	Ryan Griffin	TE	Connecticut	Compensatory
Made roster † Pro Football Hall of Fame * Made at least one Pro Bowl during career

Draft trades

- The Texans traded their fifth-round selection (No. 160 overall) to the St. Louis Rams in exchange for two sixth-round selections from the Rams – Nos. 184 and 198 overall. The Texans later traded the No. 184 selection along with their seventh-round selection (No. 233 overall) to the Oakland Raiders in exchange for the Raiders' sixth-round selection (No. 176 overall).

== Staff ==
2013 Houston Texans staff
Front office: Founder/chairman/CEO – Bob McNair; Vice chairman – Philip Burguières; Vice chairman – D. Cal McNair; Executive vice president/general manager – Rick Smith; President – Jamey Rootes; Vice president of football administration – Chris Olsen; Director of pro personnel – Brian Gardner; Senior personnel advisor – Bobby Grier; Director of college scouting – Mike Maccagnan; Head coaches: Head coach – Gary Kubiak; Assistant head coach/defensive line – Bill Kollar; Offensive coaches: Offensive coordinator – Rick Dennison; Quarterbacks – Karl Dorrell; Running backs – Chick Harris; Wide receivers – Larry Kirksey; Assistant wide receivers – Marc Lubick; Tight ends – Brian Pariani; Offensive line – John Benton; Assistant offensive line – Jim Ryan; Offensive assistant – Dan Hammerschmidt	Defensive coaches: Interim head coach/defensive coordinator – Wade Phillips; Assistant defensive line – Jeff Zgonina; Linebackers – Reggie Herring; Assistant linebackers – Bobby King; Secondary – Vance Joseph; Assistant defensive backs – Perry Carter; Special teams coaches: Special teams coordinator – Joe Marciano; Special teams assistant - Bob Ligashesky; Strength and conditioning: Head strength and conditioning – Cedric Smith; Assistant strength and conditioning – Matt Schiotz; Strength and conditioning intern – Taylor Porter

== Final roster ==
2013 Houston Texans roster
Quarterbacks (QB): 7 Case Keenum; 8 Matt Schaub; 13 T. J. Yates; Running backs (RB): 37 Ray Graham; 41 Jonathan Grimes; 28 Dennis Johnson; 33 Greg Jones FB; 42 Toben Opurum FB; 32 Chad Spann; Wide receivers (WR): 10 DeAndre Hopkins; 18 Lestar Jean; 80 Andre Johnson; 82 Keshawn Martin; 11 DeVier Posey; Tight ends (TE): 84 Ryan Griffin; 48 Phillip Supernaw	Offensive linemen (OL): 79 Brandon Brooks G; 76 Duane Brown T; 66 Andrew Gardner T; 68 Ryan Harris T; 60 Ben Jones G/C; 62 Alex Kupper G; 55 Chris Myers C; 75 Derek Newton T; 74 Wade Smith G; 67 Cody White G; Defensive linemen (DL): 93 Jared Crick DE; 96 Tim Jamison DE; 97 Terrell McClain NT; 92 Earl Mitchell NT; 94 Antonio Smith DE; 99 J. J. Watt DE	Linebackers (LB): 50 Bryan Braman OLB; 53 Joe Mays ILB; 59 Whitney Mercilus OLB; 54 Mike Mohamed ILB; 58 Brooks Reed OLB; 91 Ricky Sapp OLB; 51 Darryl Sharpton ILB; 52 Jeff Tarpinian ILB; 57 Justin Tuggle ILB; Defensive backs (DB): 26 Brandon Harris CB; 25 Kareem Jackson CB; 31 Shiloh Keo FS; 43 Elbert Mack CB; 21 Brice McCain CB; 35 Eddie Pleasant SS; 29 Jawanza Starling SS; 36 D. J. Swearinger FS; 27 Josh Victorian CB; Special teams (ST): 4 Randy Bullock K; 9 Shane Lechler P; 46 Jon Weeks LS	Practice squad: 98 Keith Browner Jr. DE; 12 Andy Cruse WR (IR); 22 Loyce Means CB; 70 Nate Menkin T; 87 Uzoma Nwachukwu WR; 83 Rico Richardson WR; 30 Steven Terrell S; Reserve: 16 Alan Bonner WR (IR); 34 A. J. Bouye CB (IR); 56 Brian Cushing ILB (IR); 81 Owen Daniels TE (IR/DFR); 23 Arian Foster RB (IR); -- Evan Frierson ILB (IR); 88 Garrett Graham TE (IR); 24 Johnathan Joseph CB (IR); 39 Deji Karim RB (IR); 17 Alec Lemon WR (IR); 38 Danieal Manning SS (IR); 77 David Quessenberry T (IR); 47 Brad Smelley TE (IR); 44 Ben Tate RB (IR); 73 Brennan Williams T (IR); 54 Trevardo Williams OLB (IR); Rookies in italics 53 active, 17 reserve, 6 practice squad

== Schedule ==
=== Preseason ===
Week	Date	Opponent	Result	Record	Venue	Recap
1	August 9	at Minnesota Vikings	**W** 27–13	1–0	Mall of America Field	Recap
2	August 17	Miami Dolphins	**W** 24–17	2–0	Reliant Stadium	Recap
3	August 25	New Orleans Saints	**L** 23–31	2–1	Reliant Stadium	Recap
4	August 29	at Dallas Cowboys	**W** 24–6	3–1	AT&T Stadium	Recap

=== Regular season ===
Week	Date	Opponent	Result	Record	Venue	Recap
1	September 9	at San Diego Chargers	**W** 31–28	1–0	Qualcomm Stadium	Recap
2	September 15	**Tennessee Titans**	**W** 30–24 (OT)	2–0	Reliant Stadium	Recap
3	September 22	at Baltimore Ravens	**L** 9–30	2–1	M&T Bank Stadium	Recap
4	September 29	Seattle Seahawks	**L** 20–23 (OT)	2–2	Reliant Stadium	Recap
5	October 6	at San Francisco 49ers	**L** 3–34	2–3	Candlestick Park	Recap
6	October 13	St. Louis Rams	**L** 13–38	2–4	Reliant Stadium	Recap
7	October 20	at Kansas City Chiefs	**L** 16–17	2–5	Arrowhead Stadium	Recap
8	Bye					
9	November 3	**Indianapolis Colts**	**L** 24–27	2–6	Reliant Stadium	Recap
10	November 10	at Arizona Cardinals	**L** 24–27	2–7	University of Phoenix Stadium	Recap
11	November 17	Oakland Raiders	**L** 23–28	2–8	Reliant Stadium	Recap
12	November 24	**Jacksonville Jaguars**	**L** 6–13	2–9	Reliant Stadium	Recap
13	December 1	New England Patriots	**L** 31–34	2–10	Reliant Stadium	Recap
14	December 5	at **Jacksonville Jaguars**	**L** 20–27	2–11	EverBank Field	Recap
15	December 15	at **Indianapolis Colts**	**L** 3–25	2–12	Lucas Oil Stadium	Recap
16	December 22	Denver Broncos	**L** 13–37	2–13	Reliant Stadium	Recap
17	December 29	at **Tennessee Titans**	**L** 10–16	2–14	LP Field	Recap

Note: Intra-division opponents are in bold text.

=== Game summaries ===
==== Week 1: at San Diego Chargers ====
Week One: Houston Texans at San Diego Chargers – Game summary

Quarter	1	2	3	4	Total
**Texans**	7	0	7	17	**31**
Chargers	7	14	7	0	**28**

at Qualcomm Stadium, San Diego, California

- Date: September 9
- Game time: 9:20 p.m. CDT/7:20 p.m. PDT
- Game weather: 70 °F (21 °C), partly cloudy
- Game attendance: 59,522
- Referee: Scott Green
- TV announcers (ESPN): Chris Berman, Trent Dilfer and Sal Paolantonio
- Recap, Game book

Game information

**First quarter**

- SD – Ryan Mathews 14-yard pass from Philip Rivers (Nick Novak kick), 14:45. Chargers 7–0. **Drive: 1 play, 14 yards, 0:05.**
- HOU – Owen Daniels 1-yard pass from Matt Schaub (Randy Bullock kick), 3:11. Tied 7–7. **Drive: 10 plays, 71 yards, 5:51.**

**Second quarter**

- SD – Eddie Royal 6-yard pass from Philip Rivers (Nick Novak kick), 12:24. Chargers 14–7. **Drive: 12 plays, 80 yards, 5:47.**
- SD – Vincent Brown 10-yard pass from Philip Rivers (Nick Novak kick), 0:18. Chargers 21–7. **Drive: 8 plays, 59 yards, 1:43.**

**Third quarter**

- SD – Eddie Royal 1-yard pass from Philip Rivers (Nick Novak kick), 10:42. Chargers 28–7. **Drive: 8 plays, 80 yards, 4:18.**
- HOU – Garrett Graham 7-yard pass from Matt Schaub (Randy Bullock kick), 4:57. Chargers 28–14. **Drive: 11 plays, 70 yards, 5:45.**

**Fourth quarter**

- HOU – Owen Daniels 9-yard pass from Matt Schaub (Randy Bullock kick), 14:44. Chargers 28–21. **Drive: 10 plays, 75 yards, 3:46.**
- HOU – Brian Cushing 18-yard interception return (Randy Bullock kick), 9:30. Tied 28–28.
- HOU – Randy Bullock 41-yard field goal, 0:05. Texans 31–28. **Drive: 9 plays, 38 yards, 3:53.**

**Top passers**

- HOU – Matt Schaub – 34/45, 346 yards, 3 TD, INT
- SD – Philip Rivers – 14/29, 195 yards, 4 TD, INT

**Top rushers**

- HOU – Arian Foster – 18 rushes, 57 yards
- SD – Ryan Mathews – 13 rushes, 33 yards

**Top receivers**

- HOU – Andre Johnson – 12 receptions, 146 yards
- SD – Antonio Gates – 2 receptions, 49 yards

The Texans won their fourth straight regular season opener and picked up their first franchise victory against the San Diego Chargers, improving to 1–4 against them on the late game of ESPN's Week 1 Monday Night Football doubleheader. San Diego scored 4 times compared to Houston's 1 to take a 28–7 3rd quarter lead before Houston scored 24 straight points to win 31–28.

==== Week 2: vs. Tennessee Titans ====
Week Two: Tennessee Titans at Houston Texans – Game summary

Quarter	1	2	3	4	OT	Total
Titans	7	3	0	14	0	**24**
**Texans**	7	0	7	10	6	**30**

at Reliant Stadium, Houston, Texas

- Date: September 15
- Game time: 12:00 p.m. CDT
- Game weather: Played indoors (retractable roof closed)
- Game attendance: 71,718
- Referee: Jeff Triplette
- TV announcers (CBS): Kevin Harlan and Solomon Wilcots
- Recap, Game book

Game information

**First quarter**

- HOU – Garrett Graham 1-yard pass from Matt Schaub (Randy Bullock kick), 12:30. Texans 7–0. **Drive: 5 plays, 80 yards, 2:30.**
- TEN – Kendall Wright 6-yard pass from Jake Locker (Rob Bironas kick), 5:10. Tied 7–7. **Drive: 14 plays, 80 yards, 7:20.**

**Second quarter**

- TEN – Rob Bironas 47-yard field goal, 0:04. Titans 10–7. **Drive: 4 plays, -6 yards, 1:25.**

**Third quarter**

- HOU – Owen Daniels 12-yard pass from Matt Schaub (Randy Bullock kick), 7:46. Texans 14–10. **Drive: 5 plays, 47 yards, 2:00.**

**Fourth quarter**

- HOU – Chris Johnson tackled in end zone by Joe Mays, 13:26. Texans 16–10.
- TEN – Delanie Walker 10-yard pass from Jake Locker (Rob Bironas kick), 6:37. Titans 17–16. **Drive: 9 plays, 94 yards, 4:08.**
- TEN – Alterraun Verner 23-yard interception return (Rob Bironas kick), 4:59. Titans 24–16.
- HOU – Arian Foster 1-yard run (Arian Foster run), 1:53. Tied 24–24. **Drive: 8 plays, 66 yards, 1:14.**

**Overtime**

- HOU – DeAndre Hopkins 3-yard pass from Matt Schaub, 10:38. Texans 30–24. **Drive: 11 plays, 78 yards, 4:28.**

**Top passers**

- TEN – Jake Locker – 17/30, 148 yards, 2 TD
- HOU – Matt Schaub – 26/48, 298 yards, 3 TD, 2 INT

**Top rushers**

- TEN – Chris Johnson – 25 rushes, 96 yards
- HOU – Ben Tate – 9 rushes, 93 yards

**Top receivers**

- TEN – Kendall Wright – 7 receptions, 54 yards, TD
- HOU – DeAndre Hopkins – 7 receptions, 117 yards, TD

With the overtime win, the Texans improved to 2–0 for the 4th straight year. In a hard-fought defensive battle, Tennessee built up a lead as big as 24–16 before Houston sent it to overtime behind Arian Foster's touchdown run and 2-point conversion with 1:53 to go in regulation. DeAndre Hopkins caught his first career touchdown, which was the game-winning touchdown to give the Texans the 30–24 win. If not for this overtime victory, the 2013 Texans would have become the first team since the 2001 Carolina Panthers to win their opener and lose the remainder of their games.

==== Week 3: at Baltimore Ravens ====
Week Three: Houston Texans at Baltimore Ravens – Game summary

Quarter	1	2	3	4	Total
Texans	3	6	0	0	**9**
**Ravens**	0	17	7	6	**30**

at M&T Bank Stadium, Baltimore, Maryland

- Date: September 22
- Game time: 1:00 p.m. EDT/12:00 p.m. CDT
- Game weather: 73 °F (23 °C), sunny
- Game attendance: 71,168
- Referee: John Parry
- TV announcers (CBS): Greg Gumbel and Dan Dierdorf
- Recap, Game book

Game information

**First quarter**

- HOU – Randy Bullock 27-yard field goal, 7:06. Texans 3–0. **Drive: 16 plays, 69 yards, 7:54.**

**Second quarter**

- HOU – Randy Bullock 29-yard field goal, 14:56. Texans 6–0. **Drive: 5 plays, 18 yards, 2:35.**
- BAL – Justin Tucker 28-yard field goal, 4:11. Texans 6–3. **Drive: 11 plays, 62 yards, 4:52.**
- BAL – Daryl Smith 37-yard interception return (Justin Tucker kick), 2:39. Ravens 10–6.
- BAL – Tandon Doss 82-yard punt return (Justin Tucker kick), 0:45. Ravens 17–6.
- HOU – Randy Bullock 47-yard field goal, 0:00. Ravens 17–9. **Drive: 5 plays, 51 yards, 0:45.**

**Third quarter**

- BAL – Bernard Pierce 1-yard run (Justin Tucker kick), 11:05. Ravens 24–9. **Drive: 9 plays, 29 yards, 3:55.**

**Fourth quarter**

- BAL – Justin Tucker 45-yard field goal, 9:09. Ravens 27–9. **Drive: 13 plays, 69 yards, 6:15.**
- BAL – Justin Tucker 43-yard field goal, 1:08. Ravens 30–9. **Drive: 9 plays, 27 yards, 3:51.**

**Top passers**

- HOU – Matt Schaub – 25/35, 194 yards, INT
- BAL – Joe Flacco – 16/24, 171 yards

**Top rushers**

- HOU – Arian Foster – 12 rushes, 54 yards
- BAL – Bernard Pierce – 24 rushes, 65 yards, TD

**Top receivers**

- HOU – DeAndre Hopkins – 6 receptions, 60 yards
- BAL – Torrey Smith – 5 receptions, 92 yards

The Texans' 14-game losing streak started in Baltimore, where the Ravens pummeled Houston, 30–9. The Texans fell to 2–1. After Houston grabbed a 6–3 lead, the Ravens got a pick-six and a punt return for a touchdown to make it 17–6. Baltimore blanked Houston in the second half 13–0 en route to a 30–9 win.

==== Week 4: vs. Seattle Seahawks ====
Week Four: Seattle Seahawks at Houston Texans – Game summary

Quarter	1	2	3	4	OT	Total
**Seahawks**	3	0	3	14	3	**23**
Texans	0	20	0	0	0	**20**

at Reliant Stadium, Houston, Texas

- Date: September 29
- Game time: 12:00 p.m. CDT
- Game weather: Played indoors (retractable roof closed)
- Game attendance: 71,756
- Referee: Tony Corrente
- TV announcers (Fox): Chris Myers, Tim Ryan and Jennifer Hale
- Recap, Game book

Game information

**First quarter**

- SEA – Steven Hauschka 48-yard field goal, 11:11. Seahawks 3–0. **Drive: 4 plays, 40 yards, 1:34.**

**Second quarter**

- HOU – Garrett Graham 31-yard pass from Matt Schaub (Randy Bullock kick), 14:55. Texans 7–3. **Drive: 6 plays, 90 yards, 2:52.**
- HOU – Arian Foster 5-yard pass from Matt Schaub (Randy Bullock kick), 6:11. Texans 14–3. **Drive: 10 plays, 78 yards, 5:10.**
- HOU – Randy Bullock 22-yard field goal, 3:51. Texans 17–3. **Drive: 7 plays, 15 yards, 2:13.**
- HOU – Randy Bullock 42-yard field goal, 0:01. Texans 20–3. **Drive: 12 plays, 67 yards, 1:12.**

**Third quarter**

- SEA – Steven Hauschka 39-yard field goal, 3:54. Texans 20–6. **Drive: 4 plays, 0 yards, 0:25.**

**Fourth quarter**

- SEA – Marshawn Lynch 3-yard run (Steven Hauschka kick), 7:43. Texans 20–13. **Drive: 14 plays, 75 yards, 7:28.**
- SEA – Richard Sherman 58-yard interception return (Steven Hauschka kick), 2:40. Tied 20–20.

**Overtime**

- SEA – Steven Hauschka 45-yard field goal, 3:23. Seahawks 23–20. **Drive: 8 plays, 35 yards, 3:27.**

**Top passers**

- SEA – Russell Wilson – 12/23, 123 yards, INT
- HOU – Matt Schaub – 31/49, 355 yards, 2 TD, 2 INT

**Top rushers**

- SEA – Marshawn Lynch – 17 rushes, 98 yards, TD
- HOU – Arian Foster – 27 rushes, 102 yards

**Top receivers**

- SEA – Marshawn Lynch – 3 receptions, 45 yards
- HOU – Andre Johnson – 9 receptions, 110 yards

After falling behind 3–0 at the end of the first quarter, the Texans scored 20 unanswered to build up a 20–3 halftime lead. But with a 20–6 fourth quarter lead, Houston gave up two touchdowns, including a pick-six by Richard Sherman to tie the game at 20. The Seahawks won in overtime 23–20 on Steven Hauschka's 45-yard field goal with 3:23 to go in overtime. With the surprising loss, the Texans fell to 2–2.

==== Week 5: at San Francisco 49ers ====
Week Five: Houston Texans at San Francisco 49ers – Game summary

Quarter	1	2	3	4	Total
Texans	0	0	3	0	**3**
**49ers**	14	7	3	10	**34**

at Candlestick Park, San Francisco, California

- Date: October 6
- Game time: 7:20 p.m. CDT/5:20 p.m. PDT
- Game weather: 76 °F (24 °C), sunny
- Game attendance: 69,732
- Referee: Mike Carey
- TV announcers (NBC): Al Michaels, Cris Collinsworth and Michele Tafoya
- Recap, Game book

Game information

**First quarter**

- SF – Tramaine Brock 18-yard interception return (Phil Dawson kick), 13:30. 49ers 7–0.
- SF – Frank Gore 1-yard run (Phil Dawson kick), 1:37. 49ers 14–0. **Drive: 12 plays, 65 yards, 5:51.**

**Second quarter**

- SF – Anthony Dixon 2-yard run (Phil Dawson kick), 5:03. 49ers 21–0. **Drive: 4 plays, 32 yards, 1:58.**

**Third quarter**

- HOU – Randy Bullock 41-yard field goal, 12:01. 49ers 21–3. **Drive: 7 plays, 43 yards, 1:58.**
- SF – Phil Dawson 38-yard field goal, 5:15. 49ers 24–3. **Drive: 8 plays, 39 yards, 3:20.**

**Fourth quarter**

- SF – Vernon Davis 64-yard pass from Colin Kaepernick (Phil Dawson kick), 14:16. 49ers 31–3. **Drive: 3 plays, 69 yards, 1:09.**
- SF – Phil Dawson 24-yard field goal, 10:46. 49ers 34–3. **Drive: 4 plays, 2 yards, 2:31.**

**Top passers**

- HOU – Matt Schaub – 19/35, 173 yards, 3 INT
- SF – Colin Kaepernick – 6/15, 113 yards, TD

**Top rushers**

- HOU – Arian Foster – 21 rushes, 98 yards
- SF – Frank Gore – 17 rushes, 81 yards, TD

**Top receivers**

- HOU – Owen Daniels – 6 receptions, 60 yards
- SF – Vernon Davis – 3 receptions, 88 yards, TD

Matt Schaub threw another pick-six in a blowout loss to the 49ers. The final was 34–3 and the Texans fell to 2–3.

==== Week 6: vs. St. Louis Rams ====
Week Six: St. Louis Rams at Houston Texans – Game summary

Quarter	1	2	3	4	Total
**Rams**	7	10	21	0	**38**
Texans	0	6	0	7	**13**

at Reliant Stadium, Houston, Texas

- Date: October 13
- Game time: 12:00 p.m. CDT
- Game weather: Played indoors (retractable roof closed)
- Game attendance: 71,104
- Referee: Bill Leavy
- TV announcers (Fox): Chris Myers, Tim Ryan and Jennifer Hale
- Recap, Game book

Game information

**First quarter**

- STL – Cory Harkey 2-yard pass from Sam Bradford (Greg Zuerlein kick), 5:59. Rams 7–0. **Drive: 6 plays, 65 yards, 2:48.**

**Second quarter**

- STL – Greg Zuerlein 42-yard field goal, 13:26. Rams 10–0. **Drive: 6 plays, 19 yards, 3:22.**
- HOU – Randy Bullock 20-yard field goal, 8:24. Rams 10–3. **Drive: 8 plays, 78 yards, 5:01.**
- STL – Lance Kendricks 2-yard pass from Sam Bradford (Greg Zuerlein kick), 2:43. Rams 17–3. **Drive: 10 plays, 76 yards, 5:38.**
- HOU – Randy Bullock 35-yard field goal, 0:53. Rams 17–6. **Drive: 8 plays, 63 yards, 1:54.**

**Third quarter**

- STL – Brian Quick 4-yard pass from Sam Bradford (Greg Zuerlein kick), 7:42. Rams 24–6. **Drive: 10 plays, 79 yards, 5:20.**
- STL – Daren Bates 11-yard fumble return (Greg Zuerlein kick), 7:36. Rams 31–6.
- STL – Alec Ogletree 98-yard interception return (Greg Zuerlein kick), 0:36. Rams 38–6.

**Fourth quarter**

- HOU – Ben Tate 1-yard run (Randy Bullock kick), 3:15. Rams 38–13. **Drive: 12 plays, 39 yards, 6:02.**

**Top passers**

- STL – Sam Bradford – 12/16, 117 yards, 3 TD
- HOU – Matt Schaub – 15/21, 186 yards

**Top rushers**

- STL – Zac Stacy – 18 rushes, 79 yards
- HOU – Arian Foster – 20 rushes, 141 yards

**Top receivers**

- STL – Jared Cook – 2 receptions, 45 yards
- HOU – Andre Johnson – 7 receptions, 88 yards

St. Louis had 2 straight defensive touchdowns and they dominated Houston 38–13. Houston dropped to 2–4.

==== Week 7: at Kansas City Chiefs ====
Week Seven: Houston Texans at Kansas City Chiefs – Game summary

Quarter	1	2	3	4	Total
Texans	3	7	6	0	**16**
**Chiefs**	7	7	3	0	**17**

at Arrowhead Stadium, Kansas City, Missouri

- Date: October 20
- Game time: 3:25 p.m. CDT
- Game weather: 70 °F (21 °C), sunny
- Game attendance: 74,118
- Referee: Ed Hochuli
- TV announcers (CBS): Jim Nantz and Phil Simms
- Recap, Game book

Game information

**First quarter**

- HOU – Randy Bullock 48-yard field goal, 8:12. Texans 3–0. **Drive: 10 plays, 27 yards, 4:55.**
- KC – Jamaal Charles 1-yard run (Ryan Succop kick), 2:43. Chiefs 7–3. **Drive: 11 plays, 79 yards, 5:29.**

**Second quarter**

- HOU – DeAndre Hopkins 29-yard pass from Case Keenum (Randy Bullock kick), 14:54. Texans 10–7. **Drive: 5 plays, 81 yards, 2:49.**
- KC – Alex Smith 5-yard run (Ryan Succop kick), 0:56. Chiefs 14–10. **Drive: 15 plays, 97 yards, 6:35.**

**Third quarter**

- HOU – Randy Bullock 21-yard field goal, 9:24. Chiefs 14–13. **Drive: 5 plays, 25 yards, 2:07.**
- KC – Ryan Succop 22-yard field goal, 6:07. Chiefs 17–13. **Drive: 7 plays, 17 yards, 3:17.**
- HOU – Randy Bullock 47-yard field goal, 4:12. Chiefs 17–16. **Drive: 5 plays, 51 yards, 1:46.**

**Fourth quarter**

- HOU – No scoring plays

**Top passers**

- HOU – Case Keenum – 15/25, 271 yards, TD
- KC – Alex Smith – 23/34, 240 yards, INT

**Top rushers**

- HOU – Ben Tate – 15 rushes, 50 yards
- KC – Jamaal Charles – 21 rushes, 86 yards, TD

**Top receivers**

- HOU – Andre Johnson – 4 receptions, 89 yards
- KC – Dexter McCluster – 4 receptions, 70 yards

Case Keenum got the start in a game that ended with Houston losing 17–16 to Kansas City. They would drop to 2–5.

==== Week 9: vs. Indianapolis Colts ====
Battle Red Day

Week Nine: Indianapolis Colts at Houston Texans – Game summary

Quarter	1	2	3	4	Total
**Colts**	0	3	9	15	**27**
Texans	14	7	3	0	**24**

at Reliant Stadium, Houston, Texas

- Date: November 3
- Game time: 7:30 p.m. CST
- Game weather: 60 °F (16 °C), clear (retractable roof open)
- Game attendance: 71,778
- Referee: Bill Vinovich
- TV announcers (NBC): Al Michaels, Cris Collinsworth and Michele Tafoya
- Recap, Game book

Game information

**First quarter**

- HOU – Andre Johnson 62-yard pass from Case Keenum (Randy Bullock kick), 14:00. Texans 7–0. **Drive: 3 plays, 73 yards, 1:00.**
- HOU – Andre Johnson 41-yard pass from Case Keenum (Randy Bullock kick), 4:13. Texans 14–0. **Drive: 4 plays, 57 yards, 2:05.**

**Second quarter**

- IND – Adam Vinatieri 30-yard field goal, 3:30. Texans 14–3. **Drive: 4 plays, 41 yards, 1:30.**
- HOU – Andre Johnson 5-yard pass from Case Keenum (Randy Bullock kick), 0:34. Texans 21–3. **Drive: 7 plays, 72 yards, 2:56.**

**Third quarter**

- IND – Adam Vinatieri 35-yard field goal, 11:54. Texans 21–6. **Drive: 10 plays, 45 yards, 3:06.**
- HOU – Randy Bullock 43-yard field goal, 4:25. Texans 24–6. **Drive: 11 plays, 62 yards, 7:29.**
- IND – T. Y. Hilton 10-yard pass from Andrew Luck (pass failed), 0:05. Texans 24–12. **Drive: 13 plays, 78 yards, 4:20.**

**Fourth quarter**

- IND – T. Y. Hilton 58-yard pass from Andrew Luck (Adam Vinatieri kick), 9:46. Texans 24–19. **Drive: 2 plays, 67 yards, 0:46.**
- IND – T. Y. Hilton 9-yard pass from Andrew Luck (Andrew Luck pass to Coby Fleener), 4:00. Colts 27–24. **Drive: 6 plays, 52 yards, 2:09.**

**Top passers**

- IND – Andrew Luck – 18/40, 271 yards, 3 TD
- HOU – Case Keenum – 20/34, 350 yards, 3 TD

**Top rushers**

- IND – Donald Brown – 6 rushes, 49 yards
- HOU – Ben Tate – 22 rushes, 81 yards

**Top receivers**

- IND – T. Y. Hilton – 7 receptions, 121 yards, 3 TD
- HOU – Andre Johnson – 9 receptions, 229 yards, 3 TD

Houston got off to a 21–3 lead, but Indianapolis outscored them 24–3 to win 27–24. Houston dropped to 2–6. At halftime, head coach Gary Kubiak collapsed on the field on his way to the locker room with a transient ischemic attack. Defensive coordinator Wade Phillips took over head coaching duties for the remainder of the game.

==== Week 10: at Arizona Cardinals ====
Week Ten: Houston Texans at Arizona Cardinals – Game summary

Quarter	1	2	3	4	Total
Texans	7	10	0	7	**24**
**Cardinals**	7	7	6	7	**27**

at University of Phoenix Stadium, Glendale, Arizona

- Date: November 10
- Game time: 3:25 p.m. CST/2:25 p.m. MST
- Game weather: TBD (retractable roof stadium)
- Game attendance: 60,845
- Referee: Gene Steratore
- TV announcers (CBS): Kevin Harlan and Solomon Wilcots
- Recap, Game book

Game information

**First quarter**

- ARI – Matt Shaughnessy 6-yard fumble return (Jay Feely kick), 14:46. Cardinals 7–0.
- HOU – Andre Johnson 7-yard pass from Case Keenum (Randy Bullock kick), 5:55. Tied 7–7. **Drive: 8 plays, 55 yards, 4:52.**

**Second quarter**

- ARI – Rob Housler 12-yard pass from Carson Palmer (Jay Feely kick), 13:57. Cardinals 14–7. **Drive: 6 plays, 58 yards, 2:28.**
- HOU – Ryan Griffin 2-yard pass from Case Keenum (Randy Bullock kick), 9:37. Tied 14–14. **Drive: 9 plays, 80 yards, 4:20.**
- HOU – Randy Bullock 48-yard field goal, 6:31. Texans 17–14. **Drive: 6 plays, 15 yards, 2:09.**

**Third quarter**

- ARI – Jay Feely 35-yard field goal, 6:06. Tied 17–17. **Drive: 10 plays, 43 yards, 5:12.**
- ARI – Jay Feely 21-yard field goal, 0:02. Cardinals 20–17. **Drive: 9 plays, 59 yard, 4:23.**

**Fourth quarter**

- ARI – Andre Roberts 19-yard pass from Carson Palmer (Jay Feely kick), 6:42. Cardinals 27–17. **Drive: 9 plays, 67 yards, 4:48.**
- HOU – Andre Johnson 5-yard pass from Case Keenum (Randy Bullock kick), 4:34. Cardinals 27–24. **Drive: 3 plays, 5 yards, 0:12.**

**Top passers**

- HOU – Case Keenum – 22/43, 201 yards, 3 TD
- ARI – Carson Palmer – 20/32, 241 yards, 2 TD, INT

**Top rushers**

- HOU – Ben Tate – 15 rushes, 56 yards
- ARI – Andre Ellington – 11 rushes, 55 yards

**Top receivers**

- HOU – DeAndre Hopkins – 6 receptions, 69 yards
- ARI – Andre Roberts – 5 receptions, 72 yards, TD

Arizona dominated the second half in a 27–24 win. Houston dropped to 2–7

==== Week 11: vs. Oakland Raiders ====
Week Eleven: Oakland Raiders at Houston Texans – Game summary

Quarter	1	2	3	4	Total
**Raiders**	14	0	14	0	**28**
Texans	0	17	0	6	**23**

at Reliant Stadium, Houston, Texas

- Date: November 17
- Game time: 12:00 p.m. CST
- Game weather: Played indoors (retractable roof closed)
- Game attendance: 71,726
- Referee: Ron Winter
- TV announcers (CBS): Kevin Harlan and Solomon Wilcots
- Recap, Game book

Game information

**First quarter**

- OAK – Denarius Moore 5-yard pass from Matt McGloin (Sebastian Janikowski kick), 9:26. Raiders 7–0. **Drive: 6 plays, 16 yards, 3:54.**
- OAK – Rod Streater 16-yard pass from Matt McGloin (Sebastian Janikowski kick), 3:45. Raiders 14–0. **Drive: 1 play, 16 yards, 0:05.**

**Second quarter**

- HOU – Garrett Graham 42-yard pass from Case Keenum (Randy Bullock kick), 11:52. Raiders 14–7. **Drive: 4 plays, 85 yards, 2:07.**
- HOU – Keshawn Martin 87-yard punt return (Randy Bullock kick), 2:56. Tied 14–14.
- HOU – Randy Bullock 51-yard field goal, 0:40. Texans 17–14. **Drive: 9 plays, 43 yards, 1:46.**

**Third quarter**

- OAK – Mychal Rivera 26-yard pass from Matt McGloin (Sebastian Janikowski kick), 8:13. Raiders 21–17. **Drive: 5 plays, 73 yards, 2:21.**
- OAK – Rashad Jennings 80-yard run (Sebastian Janikowski kick), 2:26. Raiders 28–17. **Drive: 1 play, 80 yards, 0:13.**

**Fourth quarter**

- HOU – Randy Bullock 26-yard field goal, 12:13. Raiders 28–20. **Drive: 9 plays, 61 yards, 2:34.**
- HOU – Randy Bullock 30-yard field goal, 8:02. Raiders 28–23. **Drive: 10 plays, 33 yards, 3:18.**

**Top passers**

- OAK – Matt McGloin – 18/32, 197 yards, 3 TD
- HOU – Case Keenum – 13/24, 170 yards, TD, INT

**Top rushers**

- OAK – Rashad Jennings – 22 rushes, 150 yards, TD
- HOU – Ben Tate – 19 rushes, 88 yards

**Top receivers**

- OAK – Rod Streater – 6 receptions, 84 yards, TD
- HOU – Garrett Graham – 7 receptions, 136 yards, TD

==== Week 12: vs. Jacksonville Jaguars ====
Week Twelve: Jacksonville Jaguars at Houston Texans – Game summary

Quarter	1	2	3	4	Total
**Jaguars**	7	3	0	3	**13**
Texans	0	3	3	0	**6**

at Reliant Stadium, Houston, Texas

- Date: November 24
- Game time: 12:00 p.m. CST
- Game weather: Played indoors (retractable roof closed)
- Game attendance: 71,659
- Referee: Mike Carey
- TV announcers (CBS): Bill Macatee and Steve Tasker
- Recap, Game book

Game information

**First quarter**

- JAX – Maurice Jones-Drew 1-yard run (Josh Scobee kick), 10:57. Jaguars 7–0. **Drive: 10 plays, 75 yards, 4:03.**

**Second quarter**

- JAX – Josh Scobee 30-yard field goal, 7:57. Jaguars 10–0. **Drive: 7 plays, 73 yards, 4:01.**
- HOU – Randy Bullock 49-yard field goal, 0:29. Jaguars 10–3. **Drive: 9 plays, 49 yards, 4:35.**

**Third quarter**

- HOU – Randy Bullock 20-yard field goal, 8:26. Jaguars 10–6. **Drive: 13 plays, 83 yards, 6:34.**

**Fourth quarter**

- JAX – Josh Scobee 53-yard field goal, 6:44. Jaguars 13–6. **Drive: 8 plays, 42 yards, 4:27.**

**Top passers**

- JAX – Chad Henne – 23/32, 239 yards
- HOU – Case Keenum – 18/34, 169 yards, INT

**Top rushers**

- JAX – Maurice Jones-Drew – 14 rushes, 84 yards, TD
- HOU – Dennis Johnson – 13 rushes, 74 yards

**Top receivers**

- JAX – Cecil Shorts – 8 receptions, 71 yards
- HOU – Garrett Graham – 5 receptions, 32 yards

==== Week 13: vs. New England Patriots ====
Week Thirteen: New England Patriots at Houston Texans – Game summary

Quarter	1	2	3	4	Total
**Patriots**	7	0	14	13	**34**
Texans	10	7	7	7	**31**

at Reliant Stadium, Houston, Texas

- Date: December 1
- Game time: 12:00 p.m. CST
- Game weather: 64 °F (18 °C), mostly cloudy (retractable roof open)
- Game attendance: 71,769
- Referee: Pete Morelli
- TV announcers (CBS): Greg Gumbel and Dan Dierdorf
- Recap, Game book

Game information

**First quarter**

- HOU – Ben Tate 8-yard run (Randy Bullock kick), 8:44. Texans 7–0. **Drive: 5 plays, 52 yards, 2:04.**
- HOU – Randy Bullock 43-yard field goal, 4:10. Texans 10–0. **Drive: 4 plays, 6 yards, 1:32.**
- NE – Rob Gronkowski 23-yard pass from Tom Brady (Stephen Gostkowski kick), 1:25. Texans 10–7. **Drive: 6 plays, 55 yards, 2:45.**

**Second quarter**

- HOU – Ben Tate 20-yard run (Randy Bullock kick), 1:47. Texans 17–7. **Drive: 7 plays, 55 yards, 3:03.**

**Third quarter**

- NE – James Develin 1-yard run (Stephen Gostkowski kick), 12:41. Texans 17–14. **Drive: 5 plays, 78 yards, 2:19.**
- NE – Shane Vereen 9-yard pass from Tom Brady (Stephen Gostkowski kick), 8:05. Patriots 21–17. **Drive: 7 plays, 73 yards, 3:04.**
- HOU – Case Keenum 5-yard run (Randy Bullock kick), 2:11. Texans 24–21. **Drive: 10 plays, 81 yards, 5:55.**

**Fourth quarter**

- NE – LeGarrette Blount 7-yard run (Stephen Gostkowski kick), 13:09. Patriots 28–24. **Drive: 9 plays, 81 yards, 4:02.**
- HOU – Ben Tate 10-yard run (Randy Bullock kick), 11:35. Texans 31–28. **Drive: 3 plays, 80 yards, 1:34.**
- NE – Stephen Gostkowski 53-yard field goal, 7:16. Tied 31–31. **Drive: 9 plays, 40 yards, 4:19.**
- NE – Stephen Gostkowski 53-yard field goal, 3:12. Patriots 34–31. **Drive: 7 plays, 18 yards, 3:32.**

**Top passers**

- NE – Tom Brady – 29/41, 371 yards, 2 TD, INT
- HOU – Case Keenum – 15/30, 272 yards, INT

**Top rushers**

- NE – LeGarrette Blount – 12 rushes, 44 yards, TD
- HOU – Ben Tate – 22 rushes, 102 yards, 3 TD

**Top receivers**

- NE – Rob Gronkowski – 6 receptions, 127 yards, TD
- HOU – Andre Johnson – 8 receptions, 121 yards

The Texans had a lead as much as 17–7 at the half, but fell 34–31 to the Patriots to match their combined number of losses from the previous two seasons (10).

==== Week 14: at Jacksonville Jaguars ====
Week Fourteen: Houston Texans at Jacksonville Jaguars – Game summary

Quarter	1	2	3	4	Total
Texans	0	7	10	3	**20**
**Jaguars**	7	10	7	3	**27**

at EverBank Field, Jacksonville, Florida

- Date: December 5
- Game time: 8:25 p.m. EST/7:25 p.m. CST
- Game weather: 72 °F (22 °C), 0% chance of rain
- Game attendance: 60,414
- Referee: Tony Corrente
- TV announcers (NFLN): Brad Nessler, Mike Mayock and Alex Flanagan
- Recap, Game book

Game information

**First quarter**

- JAX – Marcedes Lewis 1-yard pass from Chad Henne (Josh Scobee kick), 8:48. Jaguars 7–0. **Drive: 13 plays, 75 yards, 6:12.**

**Second quarter**

- JAX – Cecil Shorts 6-yard pass from Chad Henne (Josh Scobee kick), 13:41. Jaguars 14–0. **Drive: 4 plays, 86 yards, 1:30.**
- HOU – Keshawn Martin 8-yard pass from Case Keenum (Randy Bullock kick), 1:53. Jaguars 14–7. **Drive: 12 plays, 91 yards, 6:57.**
- JAX – Josh Scobee 40-yard field goal, 0:03. Jaguars 17–7. **Drive: 6 plays, 37 yards, 0:51.**

**Third quarter**

- HOU – Randy Bullock 34-yard field goal, 8:29. Jaguars 17–10. **Drive: 5 plays, 30 yards, 1:20.**
- JAX – Jordan Todman 21-yard pass from Ace Sanders (Josh Scobee kick), 6:12. Jaguars 24–10. **Drive: 6 plays, 90 yards, 2:17.**
- HOU – Garrett Graham 5-yard pass from Matt Schaub (Randy Bullock kick), 1:08. Jaguars 24–17. **Drive: 7 plays, 75 yards, 3:02.**

**Fourth quarter**

- HOU – Randy Bullock 31-yard field goal, 11:31. Jaguars 24–20. **Drive: 11 plays, 98 yards, 3:21.**
- JAX – Josh Scobee 39-yard field goal, 0:25. Jaguars 27–20. **Drive: 4 plays, 0 yards, 1:43.**

**Top passers**

- HOU – Matt Schaub – 17/29, 198 yards, TD, INT
- JAX – Chad Henne – 12/27, 117 yards, 2 TD

**Top rushers**

- HOU – Ben Tate – 14 rushes, 53 yards
- JAX – Maurice Jones-Drew – 14 rushes, 103 yards

**Top receivers**

- HOU – Andre Johnson – 13 receptions, 154 yards
- JAX – Marcedes Lewis – 2 receptions, 42 yards, TD

With the Texans dropping to 2–11, Houston was swept by the Jaguars for the first time since 2009.

==== Week 15: at Indianapolis Colts ====
Week Fifteen: Houston Texans at Indianapolis Colts – Game summary

Quarter	1	2	3	4	Total
Texans	3	0	0	0	**3**
**Colts**	7	13	5	0	**25**

at Lucas Oil Stadium, Indianapolis, Indiana

- Date: December 15
- Game time: 1:00 p.m. EST/12:00 p.m. CST
- Game weather: Played indoors (retractable roof closed)
- Game attendance: 65,470
- Referee: Jerome Boger
- TV announcers (CBS): Kevin Harlan and Solomon Wilcots
- Recap, Game book

Game information

**First quarter**

- IND – Griff Whalen 14-yard pass from Andrew Luck (Adam Vinatieri kick), 9:31. Colts 7–0. **Drive: 11 plays, 77 yards, 5:29.**
- HOU – Randy Bullock 49-yard field goal, 1:46. Colts 7–3. **Drive: 7 plays, 22 yards, 2:27.**

**Second quarter**

- IND – Adam Vinatieri 37-yard field goal, 12:00. Colts 10–3. **Drive: 4 plays, -2 yards, 1:29.**
- IND – Trent Richardson 9-yard pass from Andrew Luck (Adam Vinatieri kick), 7:03. Colts 17–3. **Drive: 4 plays, 71 yards, 2:11.**
- IND – Adam Vinatieri 43-yard field goal, 1:44. Colts 20–3. **Drive: 6 plays, 19 yards, 1:11.**

**Third quarter**

- IND – Adam Vinatieri 40-yard field goal, 12:27. Colts 23–3. **Drive: 4 plays, 8 yards, 1:08.**
- IND – Duane Brown tackled in end zone, 1:53. Colts 25–3.

**Fourth quarter**

- No scoring plays

**Top passers**

- HOU – Case Keenum – 18/34, 168 yards, 2 INT
- IND – Andrew Luck – 19/32, 180 yards, 2 TD, INT

**Top rushers**

- HOU – Ben Tate – 16 rushes, 72 yards
- IND – Trent Richardson – 19 rushes, 64 yards

**Top receivers**

- HOU – Ryan Griffin – 6 receptions, 62 yards
- IND – T. Y. Hilton – 8 receptions, 78 yards

With the loss, the Texans were swept by the Colts for the first time since 2009.

==== Week 16: vs. Denver Broncos ====
Week Sixteen: Denver Broncos at Houston Texans – Game summary

Quarter	1	2	3	4	Total
**Broncos**	3	13	0	21	**37**
Texans	3	3	7	0	**13**

at Reliant Stadium, Houston, Texas

- Date: December 22
- Game time: 12:00 p.m. CST
- Game weather: 58 °F (14 °C), partly cloudy (retractable roof open)
- Game attendance: 71,761
- Referee: Ed Hochuli
- TV announcers (CBS): Ian Eagle and Dan Fouts
- Recap, Game book

Game information

**First quarter**

- DEN – Matt Prater 32-yard field goal, 8:53. Broncos 3–0. **Drive: 12 plays, 78 yards, 4:38.**
- HOU – Randy Bullock 45-yard field goal, 2:53. Tied 3–3. **Drive: 7 plays, 47 yards, 3:04.**

**Second quarter**

- DEN – Demaryius Thomas 36-yard pass from Peyton Manning (Matt Prater kick), 14:54. Broncos 10–3. **Drive: 5 plays, 64 yards, 2:08.**
- HOU – Randy Bullock 35-yard field goal, 6:09. Broncos 10–6. **Drive: 7 plays, 10 yards, 3:45.**
- DEN – Matt Prater 25-yard field goal, 0:59. Broncos 13–6. **Drive: 13 plays, 69 yards, 5:10.**
- DEN – Matt Prater 44-yard field goal, 0:00. Broncos 16–6. **Drive: 4 plays, 44 yards, 0:26.**

**Third quarter**

- HOU – Keshawn Martin 15-yard pass from Matt Schaub (Randy Bullock kick), 10:33. Broncos 16–13. **Drive: 9 plays, 74 yards, 3:14.**

**Fourth quarter**

- DEN – Eric Decker 10-yard pass from Peyton Manning (Matt Prater kick), 13:26. Broncos 23–13. **Drive: 2 plays, 28 yards, 0:45.**
- DEN – Eric Decker 20-yard pass from Peyton Manning (Matt Prater kick), 6:47. Broncos 30–13. **Drive: 8 plays, 55 yards, 3:03.**
- DEN – Julius Thomas 25-yard pass from Peyton Manning (Matt Prater kick), 4:28. Broncos 37–13. **Drive: 3 plays, 56 yards, 0:48.**

**Top passers**

- DEN – Peyton Manning – 32/51, 400 yards, 4 TD
- HOU – Matt Schaub – 18/37, 176 yards, TD, 2 INT

**Top rushers**

- DEN – Knowshon Moreno – 11 rushes, 76 yards
- HOU – Deji Karim – 8 rushes, 30 yards

**Top receivers**

- DEN – Eric Decker – 10 receptions, 131 yards, 2 TD
- HOU – Ryan Griffin – 5 receptions, 66 yards

==== Week 17: at Tennessee Titans ====
Week Seventeen: Houston Texans at Tennessee Titans – Game summary

Quarter	1	2	3	4	Total
Texans	7	0	0	3	**10**
**Titans**	0	6	7	3	**16**

at LP Field, Nashville, Tennessee

- Date: December 29
- Game time: 12:00 p.m. CST
- Game weather: 53 °F (12 °C), sunny
- Game attendance: 69,143
- Referee: Terry McAulay
- TV announcers (CBS): Andrew Catalon and Adam Archuleta
- Recap, Game book

Game information

**First quarter**

- HOU – Jonathan Grimes 3-yard run (Randy Bullock kick), 9:37. Texans 7–0. **Drive: 9 plays, 63 yards, 5:23.**

**Second quarter**

- TEN – Rob Bironas 42-yard field goal, 9:49. Texans 7–3. **Drive: 7 plays, 32 yards, 3:36.**
- TEN – Rob Bironas 55-yard field goal, 0:00. Texans 7–6. **Drive: 7 plays, 58 yards, 1:53.**

**Third quarter**

- TEN – Chris Johnson 11-yard run (Rob Bironas kick), 5:39. Titans 13–7. **Drive: 7 plays, 36 yards, 3:41.**

**Fourth quarter**

- TEN – Rob Bironas 37-yard field goal, 10:48. Titans 16–7. **Drive: 6 plays, 14 yards, 3:30.**
- HOU – Randy Bullock 19-yard field goal, 2:56. Titans 16–10. **Drive: 8 plays, 89 yards, 2:50.**

**Top passers**

- HOU – Matt Schaub – 22/34, 229 yards, 2 INT
- TEN – Ryan Fitzpatrick – 15/24, 166 yards, INT

**Top rushers**

- HOU – Jonathan Grimes – 16 rushes, 50 yards, TD
- TEN – Chris Johnson – 27 rushes, 127 yards, TD

**Top receivers**

- HOU – Jonathan Grimes – 6 receptions, 76 yards
- TEN – Kendall Wright – 5 receptions, 50 yards

With the loss to Tennessee, Houston lost 14 straight games to close out a disappointing season.

The Texans 14 game losing streak has matched the 1980 Saints and the 1976 Buccaneers.

== Standings ==
=== Division ===
AFC South
	W	L	T	PCT	DIV	CONF	PF	PA	STK
^{(4)} Indianapolis Colts	11	5	0	.688	6–0	9–3	391	336	W3
Tennessee Titans	7	9	0	.438	2–4	6–6	362	381	W2
Jacksonville Jaguars	4	12	0	.250	3–3	4–8	247	449	L3
Houston Texans	2	14	0	.125	1–5	2–10	276	428	L14

=== Conference ===
AFC
#	Team	Division	W	L	T	PCT	DIV	CONF	SOS	SOV	STK
Division winners
1	Denver Broncos	West	13	3	0	.813	5–1	9–3	.469	.423	W2
2	New England Patriots	East	12	4	0	.750	4–2	9–3	.473	.427	W2
3 (Note: Cincinnati defeated Indianapolis head-to-head (Week 14, 42–28).)	Cincinnati Bengals	North	11	5	0	.688	3–3	8–4	.480	.494	W2
4	Indianapolis Colts	South	11	5	0	.688	6–0	9–3	.484	.449	W3
Wild cards
5	Kansas City Chiefs	West	11	5	0	.688	2–4	7–5	.445	.335	L2
6	San Diego Chargers	West	9	7	0	.563	4–2	6–6	.496	.549	W4
Did not qualify for the postseason
7 (Note: Pittsburgh finished with a better division record than Baltimore.) (Note: Pittsburgh defeated the New York Jets head-to-head (Week 6, 19–6).)	Pittsburgh Steelers	North	8	8	0	.500	4–2	6–6	.469	.441	W3
8 (Note: Baltimore defeated the New York Jets head-to-head (Week 12, 19–3).)	Baltimore Ravens	North	8	8	0	.500	3–3	6–6	.484	.418	L2
9 (Note: The New York Jets finished with a better division record than Miami.)	New York Jets	East	8	8	0	.500	3–3	5–7	.488	.414	W2
10	Miami Dolphins	East	8	8	0	.500	2–4	7–5	.523	.523	L2
11	Tennessee Titans	South	7	9	0	.438	2–4	6–6	.504	.375	W2
12	Buffalo Bills	East	6	10	0	.375	3–3	5–7	.520	.500	L1
13 (Note: Oakland and Jacksonville finished with a better conference record than Cleveland.) (Note: Oakland defeated Jacksonville head-to-head (Week 2, 19–9).)	Oakland Raiders	West	4	12	0	.250	1–5	4–8	.523	.359	L6
14 (Note: Jacksonville defeated Cleveland head-to-head (Week 13, 32–28).)	Jacksonville Jaguars	South	4	12	0	.250	3–3	4–8	.504	.234	L3
15	Cleveland Browns	North	4	12	0	.250	2–4	3–9	.516	.477	L7
16	Houston Texans	South	2	14	0	.125	1–5	2–10	.559	.500	L14
Tiebreakers (Note: When breaking ties for three or more teams under the NFL's rules, they are first broken within divisions, then comparing only the highest ranked remaining team from each division.)

== Statistics ==
=== Team ===
Category	Total yards	Yards per game	NFL rank (out of 32)
Passing offense	3,813	238.3	15th
Rushing offense	1,743	108.9	21st
Total offense	5,556	347.3	11th
Passing defense	3,123	195.2	3rd
Rushing defense	1,958	122.4	23rd
Total defense	5,081	317.6	7th

=== Individual ===
Category	Player	Total
Offense
Passing yards	Matt Schaub	2,310
Passing touchdowns	Matt Schaub	10
Rushing yards	Ben Tate	771
Rushing touchdowns	Ben Tate	4
Receiving yards	Andre Johnson	1,407
Receiving touchdowns	Andre Johnson	5
Defense
Tackles (Solo)	J. J. Watt	65
Sacks	J. J. Watt	10.5
Interceptions	Johnathan Joseph	3
