= Earl Mitchell =

American football player (born 1987)

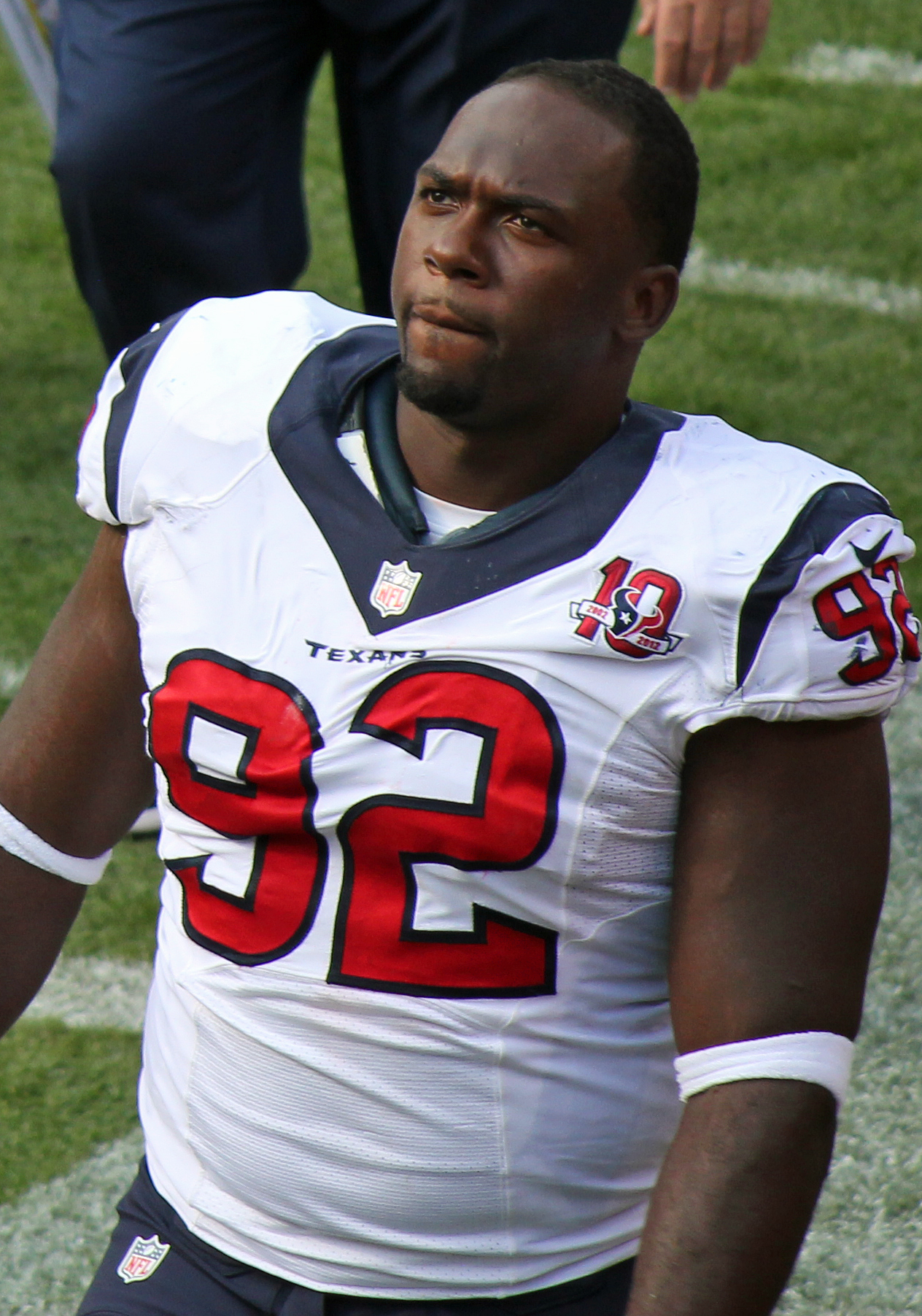
- Mitchell with the Houston Texans in 2012

No. 92, 90, 93
- Position: Defensive tackle

Personal information
- Born: September 25, 1987 (age 39); Houston, Texas, U.S.
- Listed height: 6 ft 3 in (1.91 m)
- Listed weight: 310 lb (141 kg)

Career information
- High school: North Shore (Houston)
- College: Arizona (2006–2009)
- NFL draft: 2010: 3rd round, 81st overall pick

Career history
- Houston Texans (2010–2013); Miami Dolphins (2014–2016); San Francisco 49ers (2017–2018); Seattle Seahawks (2019)*; San Francisco 49ers (2019)
- * Offseason or practice squad member only

Awards and highlights
- Second-team All-Pac-10 (2009)

Career NFL statistics
- Total tackles: 267
- Sacks: 6.5
- Forced fumbles: 1
- Fumble recoveries: 3
- Pass deflections: 9
- Stats at Pro Football Reference

Earl Mitchell (born September 25, 1987) is an American former professional football player who was a defensive tackle in the National Football League (NFL). He was selected by the Houston Texans in the third round of the 2010 NFL draft. He played college football for the Arizona Wildcats.

== College career ==
Mitchell attended the University of Arizona from 2006 to 2009.

== Professional career ==
=== Houston Texans ===
Mitchell was selected by the Houston Texans in the third round (81st overall) of the 2010 NFL draft.

=== Miami Dolphins ===
On March 11, 2014, he was signed by the Miami Dolphins to a four-year, $16 million contract including $9 million guaranteed.

On September 13, 2016, Mitchell was placed on injured reserve. He was activated off injured reserve to the active roster on November 10, 2016, prior to Week 10.

On February 17, 2017, Mitchell was released by the Dolphins.

=== San Francisco 49ers (first stint) ===
On February 24, 2017, Mitchell signed a four-year, $16 million contract with the San Francisco 49ers. In his first season in San Francisco, Mitchell started all 16 games, recording 33 combined tackles, one sack, and a career-high four passes defensed.

On January 23, 2019, the 49ers declined the two-year option on Mitchell's contract, making him a free agent in 2019.

=== Seattle Seahawks ===
On July 24, 2019, Mitchell was signed by the Seattle Seahawks. He was released on August 31, 2019.

On November 7, 2019, Mitchell announced his retirement from the NFL.

=== San Francisco 49ers (second stint) ===
On January 1, 2020, Mitchell came out of retirement and signed with the 49ers. Mitchell reached Super Bowl LIV with 49ers, but lost 31–20 to the Kansas City Chiefs. Mitchell recorded 1 tackle and 0.5 sacks in the Super Bowl.

=== NFL statistics ===
Year	Team	GP	COMB	TOTAL	AST	SACK	FF	FR	FR YDS	INT	IR YDS	AVG IR	LNG	TD	PD
2010	HOU	15	28	18	10	1.0	0	0	0	0	0	0	0	0	0
2011	HOU	16	27	14	13	1.0	0	0	0	0	0	0	0	0	1
2012	HOU	16	31	19	12	0.0	1	0	0	0	0	0	0	0	3
2013	HOU	16	48	30	18	1.5	0	0	0	0	0	0	0	0	0
2014	MIA	16	33	21	11	2.0	0	0	0	0	0	0	0	0	1
2015	MIA	12	22	14	8	0.0	0	0	0	0	0	0	0	0	0
2016	MIA	9	17	11	6	0.0	0	0	0	0	0	0	0	0	0
2017	SF	16	33	19	14	1.0	0	1	0	0	0	0	0	0	4
2018	SF	14	28	17	11	0.0	0	0	0	0	0	0	0	0	0
Career		130	268	164	104	6.5	1	1	0	0	0	0	0	0	9

== Personal life ==
Mitchell was born and raised in Houston, moving around with his mom, who separated from his dad. His grandma sometimes provided a home for him in the Trinity Garden neighborhood, but she died when Mitchell was 14 and Mitchell's dad died during his senior year in college.
