= Darryl Sharpton =

American football player (born 1988)

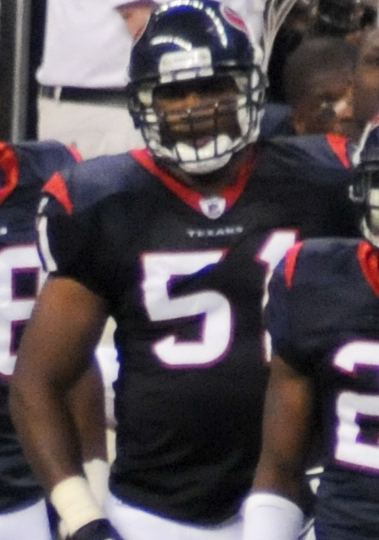
- Sharpton with the Houston Texans in 2010

No. 51, 96, 53
- Position: Linebacker

Personal information
- Born: January 1, 1988 (age 38); Coral Gables, Florida, U.S.
- Listed height: 5 ft 11 in (1.80 m)
- Listed weight: 235 lb (107 kg)

Career information
- High school: Coral Gables Senior
- College: Miami (FL)
- NFL draft: 2010: 4th round, 102nd overall pick

Career history
- Houston Texans (2010−2013); Washington Redskins (2014); Chicago Bears (2014); Arizona Cardinals (2015)*
- * Offseason or practice squad member only

Awards and highlights
- Second-team All-ACC (2009)

Career NFL statistics
- Total tackles: 176
- Sacks: 1
- Forced fumbles: 2
- Fumble recoveries: 1
- Interceptions: 1
- Stats at Pro Football Reference

Darryl Sharpton (born January 1, 1988) is an American former professional football player who was a linebacker in the National Football League (NFL). He played college football for the Miami Hurricanes and was selected by the Houston Texans in the fourth round of the 2010 NFL draft.

== Early life ==
Sharpton attended Coral Gables Senior High School in Coral Gables, Florida. As a senior, he recorded 96 tackles, two interceptions, and blocked four punts. As a junior, he had 110 tackles and returned an interception for a touchdown.

== College career ==
After being redshirted as a freshman in 2005, Sharpton earned third-team freshman All-America by The Sporting News and Collegefootballnews.com and was selected to The Sporting News ACC all-freshman team. He finished the season starting five of 12 games recording 41 tackles and a sack. As a sophomore in 2007 he started five of 11 games, recording 57 tackles. As a junior in 2008 recorded 58 tackles and a sack. As a senior in 2009 he had 106 tackles including 8.5 TFL and returned an interception for a touchdown. He also had a forced fumble.

== Professional career ==
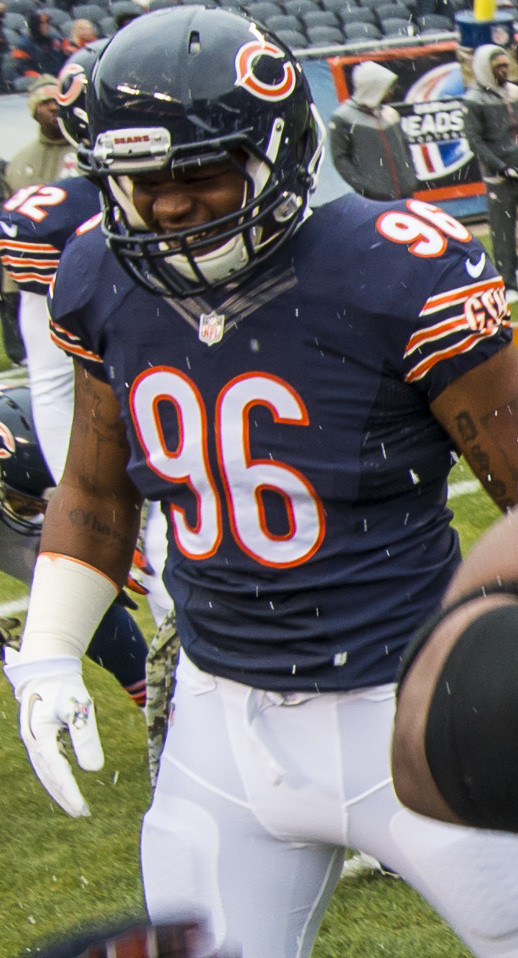
Sharpton with the Chicago Bears in 2014

=== Houston Texans ===
Sharpton was selected by the Houston Texans in the fourth round (102nd pick) of the 2010 NFL draft. He became a free agent after the 2013 season.

=== Washington Redskins ===
Sharpton signed a one-year contract with the Washington Redskins on March 13, 2014. The Redskins placed him on injured reserve on August 30, 2014. The Redskins terminated Sharpton's contract on September 22.

=== Chicago Bears ===
He signed with the Chicago Bears on September 24, 2014.

=== Arizona Cardinals ===
Sharpton signed with the Arizona Cardinals in May 2015. On August 19, he was released by the Cardinals.

== NFL career statistics ==
Legend
**Bold**	Career high

Year	Team	Games		Tackles					Interceptions					Fumbles			
Year	Team	GP	GS	Cmb	Solo	Ast	Sck	TFL	Int	Yds	TD	Lng	PD	FF	FR	Yds	TD
2010	HOU	12	6	34	23	11	**1.0**	**3**	0	0	0	0	0	0	0	0	0
2011	HOU	8	0	12	12	0	0.0	0	0	0	0	0	0	0	0	0	0
2012	HOU	7	5	28	16	12	0.0	1	**1**	-2	0	-2	**1**	0	**1**	0	0
2013	HOU	**15**	**8**	**87**	**56**	**31**	0.0	2	0	0	0	0	**1**	**2**	0	0	0
2014	CHI	5	2	15	10	5	0.0	0	0	0	0	0	**1**	0	0	0	0
Career		47	21	176	117	59	1.0	6	1	-2	0	0	3	2	1	0	0

== Post-football career ==
Darryl launched a mid-century furniture brand Edloe Finch with his wife Jessica in 2017.

== Personal life ==
Sharpton is the second cousin of famous minister Al Sharpton, though by his own admission, he thinks of him more as an uncle.
