= Zac Diles =

American football player (born 1985)

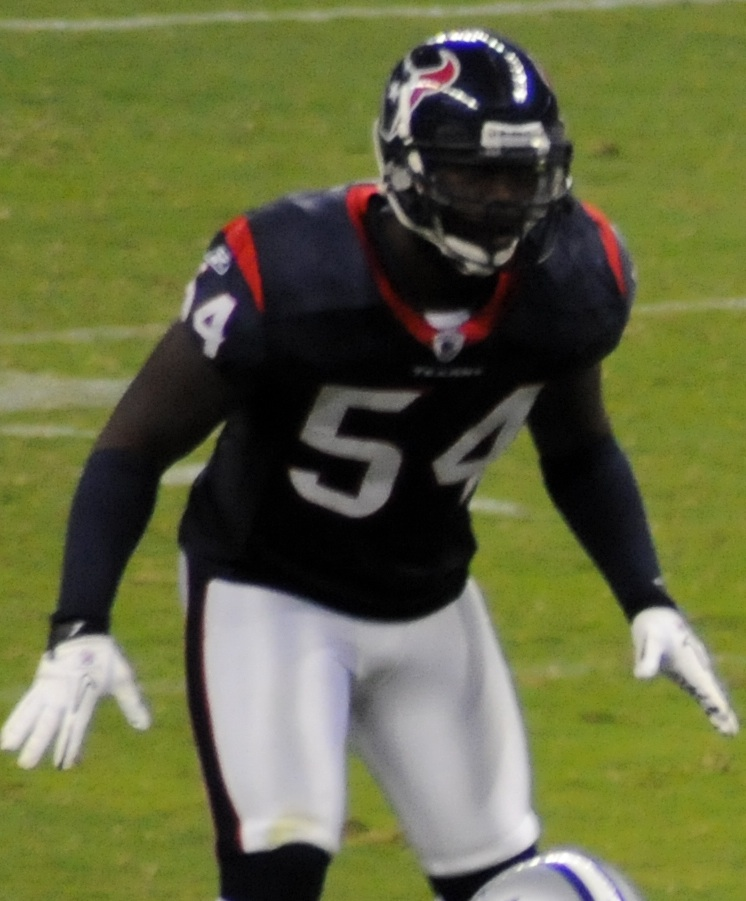
- Diles with the Houston Texans in 2010

No. 54, 53, 91
- Position: Linebacker

Personal information
- Born: June 11, 1985 (age 41); Abilene, Texas, U.S.
- Listed height: 6 ft 0 in (1.83 m)
- Listed weight: 245 lb (111 kg)

Career information
- High school: Tulare Union (Tulare, California)
- College: Kansas State
- NFL draft: 2007: 7th round, 218th overall pick

Career history
- Houston Texans (2007–2010); St. Louis Rams (2011)*; Tampa Bay Buccaneers (2011); Indianapolis Colts (2011); Tennessee Titans (2012); Kansas City Chiefs (2013)*; Tennessee Titans (2013); Cleveland Browns (2014)*; Houston Texans (2014); Cleveland Browns (2014)
- * Offseason or practice squad member only

Career NFL statistics
- Total tackles: 244
- Sacks: 1.0
- Forced fumbles: 3
- Fumble recoveries: 1
- Interceptions: 1
- Stats at Pro Football Reference

Zachary Lee Diles (born June 11, 1985) is an American former professional football player who was a linebacker in the National Football League (NFL). He was selected by the Houston Texans in the seventh round of the 2007 NFL draft. He played college football for the Kansas State Wildcats.

He was also a member of the St. Louis Rams, Tampa Bay Buccaneers, Indianapolis Colts, Tennessee Titans, Kansas City Chiefs, and Cleveland Browns.

== Early life ==
Diles attended Tulare Union High School, but did not gain any post-season recognition in football.

== College career ==
Diles was a two-year starter at Fresno City College in 2003 and 2004. He totaled 70 tackles in 2004 and 60 in 2003. In his two seasons the team had a 16-5 record and in 2004 Diles was named All.CVC

He finished his college career at Kansas State. He did not start in 2005 at Kansas State but still finished fourth on the team with 50 tackles (27 solos), adding two sacks, a pair of quarterback pressures, 5.5 stops behind the line of scrimmage and three forced fumbles. Diles earned honorable mention All-Big 12 in 2006. He ranked second on the team and eighth in the conference with 99 tackles (38 solos) while starting all 13 games at middle linebacker. He added 3.5 sacks with two pressures and was credited with 7.5 stops for losses. He recovered one fumble, deflected two passes and intercepted another.

In 24 games at Kansas State, Diles started 13 contests. He produced 149 tackles (65 solos) with 5.5 sacks, 13 stops for losses and four pressures. He caused three fumbles, recovered another, knocked down two passes and had one interception.

== Professional career ==
Pre-draft measurables
Height	Weight	40-yard dash	10-yard split	20-yard split	20-yard shuttle	Three-cone drill	Vertical jump	Broad jump	Bench press
6 ft 0 1/8 in (1.83 m)	240 lb (109 kg)	4.78 s	1.65 s	2.73 s	4.22 s	7.16 s	33 1/2 in (0.85 m)	9 ft 5 in (2.87 m)	22 reps
All values from KSU Pro Day

=== Houston Texans (first stint) ===
Diles was selected in the 7th round of the 2007 NFL draft. As a rookie in 2007 Diles played mostly on special teams. In 2008, he started 8 games as the Texans strong-side linebacker and made 66 tackles. In 2009, he moved to weakside linebacker and made 64 tackles and forced two fumbles. In 2010, he was again the starting weakside linebacker and totaled 81 tackles.

=== St. Louis Rams ===
He was signed to a free agent contract on July 29, 2011. He was released in the final cutdown after the fourth preseason game.

=== Tampa Bay Buccaneers ===
Diles signed with the Tampa Bay Buccaneers on September 4, 2011. He was cut on December 3, 2011.

=== Indianapolis Colts ===
The Indianapolis Colts claimed Diles off waivers on December 6. After playing in four games for the Colts in 2011, and recording two tackles, Diles was waived on February 7, 2012.

=== Tennessee Titans (first stint) ===
Diles signed with the Tennessee Titans on May 1, 2012.

=== Kansas City Chiefs ===
On April 12, 2013, Diles signed with the Kansas City Chiefs. He was released before the season.

=== Tennessee Titans (second stint) ===
Diles signed with the Titans on October 17, 2013. Diles was released by the Titans on December 3, 2013.

=== Cleveland Browns (first stint) ===
Diles signed a contract with the Cleveland Browns after he worked out for them during their voluntary minicamp.

=== Houston Texans (second stint) ===
Diles signed with the Texans on October 28, 2014.

=== Cleveland Browns (second stint) ===
Diles was signed by the Browns on November 19, 2014. He played in four games for the team before being released on December 16, 2014.

== NFL career statistics ==
Legend
**Bold**	Career high

Year	Team	Games		Tackles					Interceptions					Fumbles			
Year	Team	GP	GS	Cmb	Solo	Ast	Sck	TFL	Int	Yds	TD	Lng	PD	FF	FR	Yds	TD
2007	HOU	11	0	15	13	2	0.0	1	0	0	0	0	0	0	0	0	0
2008	HOU	8	8	66	47	19	**1.0**	3	**1**	0	0	0	**2**	1	0	0	0
2009	HOU	**16**	**12**	62	45	17	0.0	**7**	0	0	0	0	1	**2**	**1**	0	0
2010	HOU	15	10	**82**	**59**	**23**	0.0	4	0	0	0	0	0	0	0	0	0
2011	IND	4	0	2	2	0	0.0	0	0	0	0	0	0	0	0	0	0
2011	TAM	7	0	1	1	0	0.0	0	0	0	0	0	0	0	0	0	0
2012	TEN	6	1	11	7	4	0.0	0	0	0	0	0	0	0	0	0	0
2013	TEN	2	0	2	2	0	0.0	0	0	0	0	0	0	0	0	0	0
2014	CLE	4	0	2	2	0	0.0	0	0	0	0	0	0	0	0	0	0
2014	HOU	1	0	1	1	0	0.0	0	0	0	0	0	0	0	0	0	0
Career		74	31	244	179	65	1.0	15	1	0	0	0	3	3	1	0	0
