= 2010 Houston Texans season =

9th season in franchise history

- Owner: Bob McNair
- General manager: Rick Smith
- Head coach: Gary Kubiak
- Offensive coordinator: Rick Dennison
- Defensive coordinator: Frank Bush
- Home stadium: Reliant Stadium

Results
- Record: 6–10
- Division place: 3rd AFC South
- Playoffs: Did not qualify
- Pro Bowlers: 3: HB Arian Foster; WR Andre Johnson; FB Vonta Leach

The 2010 season was the Houston Texans' ninth season in the National Football League (NFL) and their fifth under head coach Gary Kubiak. They started the season with a 4–2 record going into a Week 7 bye week, but collapsed with two wins in the last 10 games in the second part of the season, finishing 6–10.

The Texans gave up 427 points to opponents (26.2 points per game), second-most in the AFC and fourth-most in the entire league. Football statistics site Football Outsiders states that the Texans' defense had allowed the highest percentage of plays with broken tackles in the league, allowing a broken tackle on 8.1% of defensive plays. FO also calculated that Houston had the #2 offense in the league per play (adjusted for strength of opponent), but the second-worst defense (also adjusted). In their final eight losses, the Texans allowed an average of just under 30.4 points per game.

Undrafted second year running back Arian Foster led the NFL in rushing in 2010 with 1,616 yards. Foster had rushed for 257 yards in six games the season before.

== Offseason ==
=== Coaching changes ===
- On January 6, Kyle Shanahan was hired as the new offensive coordinator of the Washington Redskins, shortly after his father, Mike Shanahan, was hired as the new head coach of the Redskins. One week later (January 13), the Texans hired former longtime Denver Broncos offensive assistant Rick Dennison as Kyle Shanahan's replacement.
- On January 12, assistant head coach/offensive line coach Alex Gibbs was hired to the same position with the Seattle Seahawks.

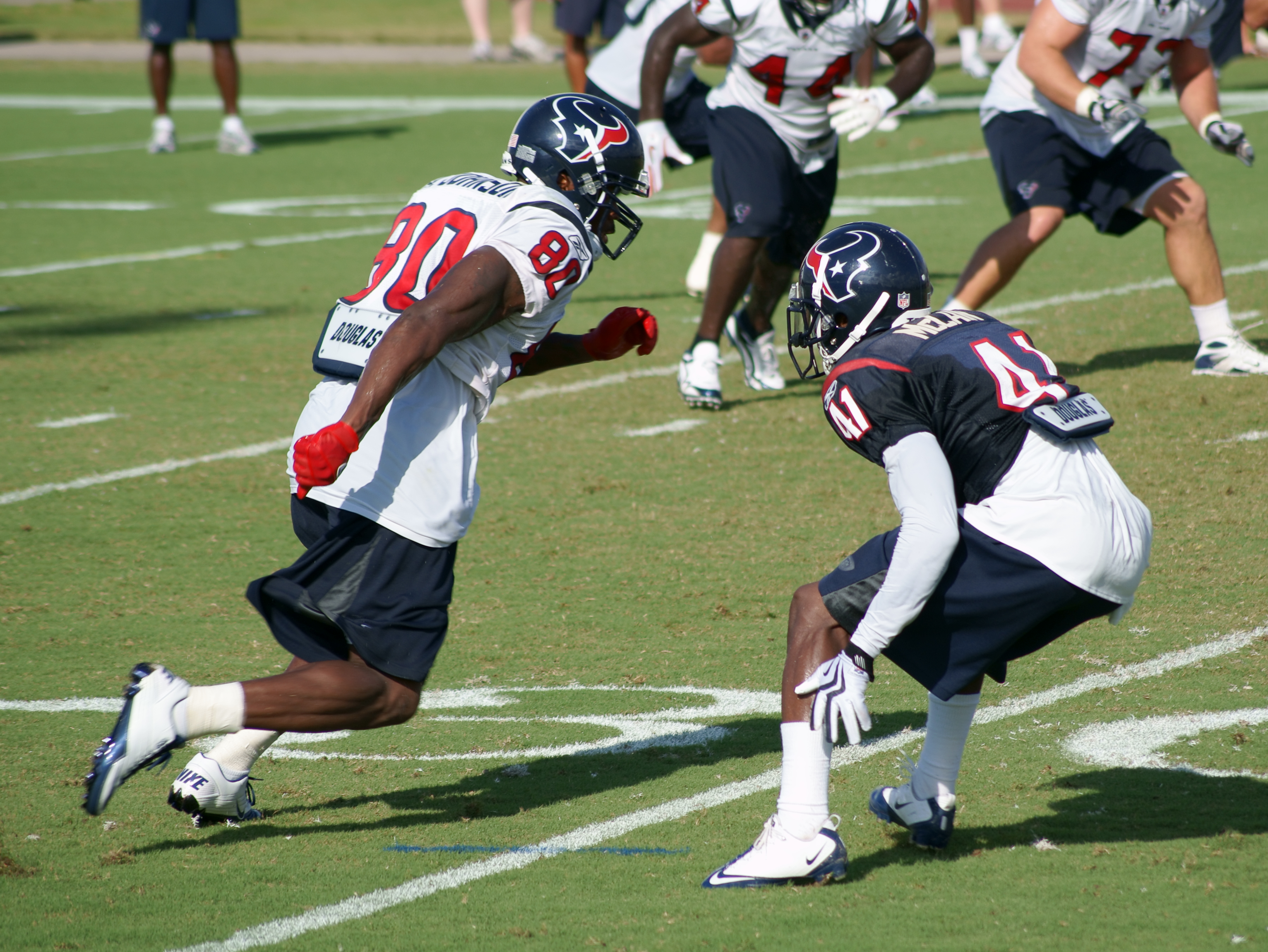
Andre Johnson (left) and Brice McCain (right) do battle in Texans' training camp, 2010.

=== NFL draft ===
2010 Houston Texans draft
Round	Pick	Player	Position	College	Notes
1	20	Kareem Jackson	Cornerback	Alabama	
2	58	Ben Tate	Running back	Auburn	
3	81	Earl Mitchell	Defensive tackle	Arizona	
4	102	Darryl Sharpton	Linebacker	Miami (FL)	
4	118	Garrett Graham	Tight end	Wisconsin	
5	144	Sherrick McManis	Cornerback	Northwestern	
6	187	Shelley Smith	Guard	Colorado State	
6	197	Trindon Holliday	Wide receiver	LSU	
7	227	Dorin Dickerson	Tight end	Pittsburgh	
Made roster

== Staff ==
2010 Houston Texans staff
Front office: Founder, chairman and chief executive officer – Bob McNair; Vice chairman – Philip Burguières; Vice chairman – D. Cal McNair; General manager – Rick Smith; President – Jamey Rootes; Vice president of football administration – Chris Olsen; Vice president of football operations – Lloyd Richards; Director of pro personnel – Brian Gardner; Associate director of pro personnel – Bobby Grier; Director of college scouting – Dale Strahm; Assistant director of college scouting – Mike Maccagnan; Head coaches: Head coach – Gary Kubiak; Assistant head coach/defensive line – Bill Kollar; Offensive coaches: Offensive coordinator – Rick Dennison; Quarterbacks – Greg Knapp; Running backs – Chick Harris; Wide receivers – Larry Kirksey; Tight ends – Brian Pariani; Offensive line – John Benton; Assistant offensive line – Frank Pollack; Offensive assistant – Marc Lubick; Offensive assistant/quality control – Bruce Matthews	Defensive coaches: Defensive coordinator – Frank Bush; Linebackers – Johnny Holland; Assistant linebackers – Robert Saleh; Defensive backs – David Gibbs; Assistant defensive backs – Perry Carter; Senior defensive assistant – Ray Rhodes; Special teams coaches: Special teams – Joe Marciano; Strength and conditioning: Head strength and conditioning – Cedric Smith; Assistant strength and conditioning – Matt Schiotz

== Roster ==
2010 Houston Texans roster
Quarterbacks (QB): 9 Matt Leinart; 7 Dan Orlovsky; 8 Matt Schaub; Running backs (RB): 23 Arian Foster; 44 Vonta Leach FB; 20 Steve Slaton KR; 32 Derrick Ward; Wide receivers (WR): 19 Dorin Dickerson; 80 Andre Johnson; 12 Jacoby Jones PR; 14 Derrick Townsel; 83 Kevin Walter; Tight ends (TE): 86 James Casey; 81 Owen Daniels; 85 Joel Dreessen; 88 Garrett Graham; 87 Anthony Hill	Offensive linemen (OL): 76 Duane Brown T; 78 Rashad Butler T; 62 Antoine Caldwell G; 55 Chris Myers C; 71 Shelley Smith G; 74 Wade Smith G; 64 Kasey Studdard G; 73 Eric Winston T; Defensive linemen (DL): 96 Mark Anderson DE; 95 Shaun Cody DT; 77 Jarvis Green DE; 99 Tim Jamison DE; 97 Damione Lewis DT; 92 Earl Mitchell DT; 91 Amobi Okoye DT; 69 DeMario Pressley DT; 94 Antonio Smith DE	Linebackers (LB): 52 Xavier Adibi OLB; 57 Kevin Bentley MLB; 56 Brian Cushing OLB; 54 Zac Diles OLB; 58 Isaiah Greenhouse MLB; 53 Stanford Keglar OLB; Defensive backs (DB): 30 Jason Allen CB; 39 Quintin Demps SS; 25 Kareem Jackson CB; 21 Brice McCain CB; 22 Sherrick McManis CB; 28 Antwaun Molden CB; 33 Troy Nolan S; 31 Bernard Pollard SS; 29 Glover Quin CB; 26 Eugene Wilson FS; Special teams (ST): 4 Neil Rackers K; 1 Matt Turk P; 46 Jon Weeks LS	Practice squad: 37 Antonio Baker S; 15 Montez Billings WR; 75 Brett Helms C; 61 Chris McCoy DE; 27 Chris Ogbonnaya RB; 70 Cole Pemberton T; 79 Cody Wallace G; 17 Paul Williams WR; Reserve: 89 David Anderson WR (IR); 34 Dominique Barber FS (IR); 98 Connor Barwin DE (IR); 50 Darnell Bing OLB (IR); 65 Mike Brisiel G (IR); 93 Tim Bulman DE (IR); 11 André Davis WR (IR); 16 Trindon Holliday WR (IR); 72 Jesse Nading DE (IR); 24 Karl Paymah CB (IR); 59 DeMeco Ryans MLB (IR); 51 Darryl Sharpton OLB (IR); 43 Ben Tate RB (IR); 90 Mario Williams DE (IR); 42 Torri Williams SS (IR); Rookies in italics 53 active, 15 reserve, 8 practice squad

== Preseason ==
Week	Date	Opponent	Result	Record	Venue	Recap
1	August 14	at Arizona Cardinals	L 16–19	0–1	University of Phoenix Stadium	Recap
2	August 21	at New Orleans Saints	L 20–38	0–2	Louisiana Superdome	Recap
3	August 28	Dallas Cowboys	W 23–7	1–2	Reliant Stadium	Recap
4	September 2	Tampa Bay Buccaneers	L 17–24	1–3	Reliant Stadium	Recap

== Regular season ==
=== Schedule ===
Week	Date	Opponent	Result	Record	Venue	Recap
1	September 12	**Indianapolis Colts**	**W** 34–24	1–0	Reliant Stadium	Recap
2	September 19	at Washington Redskins	**W** 30–27 (OT)	2–0	FedExField	Recap
3	September 26	Dallas Cowboys	**L** 13–27	2–1	Reliant Stadium	Recap
4	October 3	at Oakland Raiders	**W** 31–24	3–1	Oakland–Alameda County Coliseum	Recap
5	October 10	New York Giants	**L** 10–34	3–2	Reliant Stadium	Recap
6	October 17	Kansas City Chiefs	**W** 35–31	4–2	Reliant Stadium	Recap
7	Bye					
8	November 1	at **Indianapolis Colts**	**L** 17–30	4–3	Lucas Oil Stadium	Recap
9	November 7	San Diego Chargers	**L** 23–29	4–4	Reliant Stadium	Recap
10	November 14	at **Jacksonville Jaguars**	**L** 24–31	4–5	EverBank Field	Recap
11	November 21	at New York Jets	**L** 27–30	4–6	New Meadowlands Stadium	Recap
12	November 28	**Tennessee Titans**	**W** 20–0	5–6	Reliant Stadium	Recap
13	December 2	at Philadelphia Eagles	**L** 24–34	5–7	Lincoln Financial Field	Recap
14	December 13	Baltimore Ravens	**L** 28–34 (OT)	5–8	Reliant Stadium	Recap
15	December 19	at **Tennessee Titans**	**L** 17–31	5–9	LP Field	Recap
16	December 26	at Denver Broncos	**L** 23–24	5–10	Invesco Field at Mile High	Recap
17	January 2	**Jacksonville Jaguars**	**W** 34–17	6–10	Reliant Stadium	Recap

Note: Intra-division opponents are in bold text.

=== Standings ===
==== Division ====
AFC South
	W	L	T	PCT	DIV	CONF	PF	PA	STK
^{(3)} Indianapolis Colts	10	6	0	.625	4–2	8–4	435	388	W4
Jacksonville Jaguars	8	8	0	.500	3–3	7–5	353	419	L3
Houston Texans	6	10	0	.375	3–3	4–8	390	427	W1
Tennessee Titans	6	10	0	.375	2–4	3–9	356	339	L2

==== Conference ====
AFC
#	Team	Division	W	L	T	PCT	DIV	CONF	SOS	SOV	STK
**Division winners**
1	New England Patriots	East	14	2	0	.875	5–1	10–2	.504	.504	W8
2 (Note: Pittsburgh clinched the AFC North title instead of Baltimore based on division record (5–1 to Baltimore's 4–2).)	Pittsburgh Steelers	North	12	4	0	.750	5–1	9–3	.500	.417	W2
3 (Note: Indianapolis clinched the AFC No. 3 seed instead of Kansas City based on a head-to-head victory.)	Indianapolis Colts	South	10	6	0	.625	4–2	8–4	.473	.425	W4
4	Kansas City Chiefs	West	10	6	0	.625	2–4	6–6	.414	.381	L1
**Wild cards**
5	Baltimore Ravens	North	12	4	0	.750	4–2	9–3	.484	.422	W4
6	New York Jets	East	11	5	0	.688	4–2	9–3	.492	.409	W1
**Did not qualify for the postseason**
7	San Diego Chargers	West	9	7	0	.563	3–3	7–5	.457	.410	W1
8 (Note: Jacksonville finished ahead of Oakland based on head-to-head victory.)	Jacksonville Jaguars	South	8	8	0	.500	3–3	7–5	.453	.383	L3
9	Oakland Raiders	West	8	8	0	.500	6–0	6–6	.469	.469	W1
10	Miami Dolphins	East	7	9	0	.438	2–4	5–7	.539	.438	L3
11 (Note: Houston finished ahead of Tennessee in the AFC South based on division record (3–3 to Tennessee's 2–4).)	Houston Texans	South	6	10	0	.375	3–3	5–7	.523	.500	W1
12	Tennessee Titans	South	6	10	0	.375	2–4	3–9	.508	.500	L2
13	Cleveland Browns	North	5	11	0	.313	1–5	3–9	.570	.475	L4
14 (Note: Denver finished ahead of Buffalo and Cincinnati based on strength of victory.)	Denver Broncos	West	4	12	0	.250	1–5	3–9	.516	.453	L1
15 (Note: Buffalo finished ahead of Cincinnati based on head-to-head victory.)	Buffalo Bills	East	4	12	0	.250	1–5	3–9	.578	.344	L2
16	Cincinnati Bengals	North	4	12	0	.250	2–4	3–9	.582	.438	L1
**Tiebreakers** (Note: When breaking ties for three or more teams under the NFL's rules, they are first broken within divisions, then comparing only the highest ranked remaining team from each division.)

=== Game summaries ===
==== Week 1: vs. Indianapolis Colts ====
Week 1: Indianapolis Colts at Houston Texans – Game summary

Quarter	1	2	3	4	Total
Colts	0	10	0	14	**24**
**Texans**	6	7	7	14	**34**

at Reliant Stadium, Houston, Texas

- Date: September 12
- Game time: 12:00 p.m. CDT
- Game weather: None (retractable roof closed)
- Game attendance: 70,974
- Referee: Ed Hochuli
- TV announcers (CBS): Greg Gumbel and Dan Dierdorf
- Recap

Game information

**First quarter**

- HOU – Neil Rackers 30-yard field goal, Texans 3–0, **Drive: 9 plays, 19 yards, 3:40.**
- HOU – Neil Rackers 49-yard field goal, Texans 6–0, **Drive: 4 plays, 53 yards, 1:19.**

**Second quarter**

- HOU – Kevin Walter 22-yard pass from Matt Schaub (Neil Rackers kick), Texans 13–0, **Drive: 7 plays, 80 yards, 3:44.**
- IND – Reggie Wayne 14-yard pass from Peyton Manning (Adam Vinatieri kick), Texans 13–7, **Drive: 7 plays, 35 yards, 2:53.**
- IND – Adam Vinatieri 20-yard field goal, Texans 13–10, **Drive: 11 plays, 63 yards, 3:35.**

**Third quarter**

- HOU – Arian Foster 1-yard run (Neil Rackers kick), Texans 20–10, **Drive: 15 plays, 66 yards, 7:57.**

**Fourth quarter**

- HOU – Arian Foster 25-yard run (Neil Rackers kick), Texans 27–10, **Drive: 4 plays, 91 yards, 1:57.**
- IND – Dallas Clark 10-yard pass from Peyton Manning (Adam Vinatieri kick), Texans 27–17, **Drive: 12 plays, 75 yards, 3:49.**
- HOU – Arian Foster 8-yard run (Neil Rackers kick), Texans 34–17, **Drive: 7 plays, 41 yards, 2:56.**
- IND – Austin Collie 73-yard pass from Peyton Manning (Adam Vinatieri kick), Texans 34–24, **Drive: 2 plays, 77 yards, 0:41.**

**Top passers**

- IND – Peyton Manning – 40/57, 433 yards, 3 TD
- HOU – Matt Schaub – 9/17, 107 yards, TD, INT

**Top rushers**

- IND – Joseph Addai – 10 rushes, 44 yards
- HOU – Arian Foster – 33 rushes, 231 yards, 3 TD

**Top receivers**

- IND – Austin Collie – 11 rushes, 163 yards, TD
- HOU – Andre Johnson – 3 receptions, 33 yards

**Top tacklers**

- IND – Antoine Bethea – 8 tackles, 5 assists
- HOU – Zac Diles – 9 tackles, 3 assists

Starting lineups: HOUSTON – OFFENSE: QB Matt Schaub, LT Duane Brown, LG Wade Smith, C Chris Myers, RT Antoine Caldwell, RG Eric Winston, WR Andre Johnson, RB Arian Foster, FB Vonta Leach, TE Owen Daniels, WR Kevin Walter.

The Texans began their season with a home game against the Indianapolis Colts, a division rival in which they had only beaten once ever. However, Houston got off to an early 13–0 lead after 30 and 49-yard field goals from Neil Rackers (who had recently replaced Kris Brown as the team's kicker) and a 22-yard touchdown pass from Matt Schaub, leading passer in the league a year ago, to Kevin Walter. As expected, the Colts wouldn't go down without a fight as Indy scored ten unanswered points to close out the half on a 14-yard touchdown pass from Peyton Manning to Reggie Wayne and a 20-yard field goal by Adam Vinatieri. With the momentum seemingly shifting to Indianapolis, Houston took nearly eight minutes off the third-quarter clock with a 15-play drive (13 rushes) out of the locker room, as Arian Foster scored from a yard out, his first of three touchdowns on the day. Going into the fourth with Houston leading 20–10, the Texans continued to run, and the Colts continued to pass, as Peyton Manning attempted 57 passes that day, completing 40, a career-high. However, it wouldn't be enough; even though the Colts scored two touchdowns on a 10-yard pass to Dallas Clark and a 73-yard pass to Austin Collie, the Texans would score two of their own: 25 and 8-yard runs from Arian Foster en route to a 34–24 Houston win at Reliant Stadium. Arian Foster finished with 231 rushing yards on 33 carries. Both were Houston records for a game, and the 231 yards was the second most rushing yards on opening week, only behind O. J. Simpson. Peyton Manning eventually went 40/57 for 433 yards and three touchdowns. Houston began the season 1–0 and won for only the second time against Indianapolis, against fifteen losses. The Colts, after going 0–4 in the 2010 preseason, lost their fifth game overall to start the 2010 year.

==== Week 2: at Washington Redskins ====
Week 2: Houston Texans at Washington Redskins – Game summary

Quarter	1	2	3	4	OT	Total
**Texans**	0	7	10	10	3	**30**
Redskins	6	14	7	0	0	**27**

at FedExField, Landover, Maryland

- Date: September 19
- Game time: 3:15 p.m. CDT
- Game weather: 85 °F (29 °C) (Sunny)
- Game attendance: 88,240
- Referee: Jeff Triplette
- TV announcers (CBS): Ian Eagle and Dan Fouts
- Recap

Game information

**First quarter**

- WAS – Graham Gano 41-yard field goal, Redskins 3–0, **Drive: 9 plays, 57 yards, 5:23.**
- WAS – Graham Gano 27-yard field goal, Redskins 6–0, **Drive: 5 plays, 33 yards, 2:11.**

**Second quarter**

- HOU – Jacoby Jones 5-yard pass from Matt Schaub (Neil Rackers kick), Texans 7–6, **Drive: 11 plays, 77 yards, 5:52.**
- WAS – Clinton Portis 1-yard run (Graham Gano kick), Redskins 13–7, **Drive: 5 plays, 73 yards, 2:27.**
- WAS – Clinton Portis 1-yard run (Graham Gano kick), Redskins 20–7, **Drive: 4 plays, 63 yards, 0:59.**

**Third quarter**

- HOU – Neil Rackers 47-yard field goal, Redskins 20–10, **Drive: 11 plays, 56 yards, 5:38.**
- WAS – Chris Cooley 22-yard pass from Donovan McNabb (Graham Gano kick), Redskins 27–10, **Drive: 9 plays, 92 yards, 5:31.**
- HOU – Kevin Walter 6-yard pass from Matt Schaub (Neil Rackers kick), Redskins 27–17, **Drive: 6 plays, 78 yards, 3:51.**

**Fourth quarter**

- HOU – Neil Rackers 43-yard field goal, Redskins 27–20, **Drive: 5 plays, 40 yards, 2:05.**
- HOU – Andre Johnson 34-yard pass from Matt Schaub (Neil Rackers kick), Tied 27–27, **Drive: 8 plays, 81 yards, 1:13.**

**Overtime**

- HOU – Neil Rackers 35-yard field goal, Texans 30–27, **Drive: 7 plays, 41 yards, 3:48.**

**Top passers**

- HOU – Matt Schaub – 38/52, 497 yards, 3 TD, INT
- WAS – Donovan McNabb – 28/38, 426 yards, TD

**Top rushers**

- HOU – Arian Foster – 19 rushes, 69 yards
- WAS – Clinton Portis – 13 rushes, 33 yards, 2 TD

**Top receivers**

- HOU – Andre Johnson – 12 receptions, 158 yards, TD
- WAS – Santana Moss – 10 receptions, 89 yards

**Top tacklers**

- HOU – Zac Diles, Glover Quin – 5 tackles, 3 assists
- WAS – Reed Doughty – 10 tackles, 4 assists

Hoping to maintain their winning streak the Texans flew to FedExField for an Interconference duel with the Redskins. In the first quarter The Texans trailed early as kicker Graham Gano got a 41 and a 27-yard field goal. In the second quarter the Texans replied and took the lead with QB Matt Schaub completing a 5-yard TD pass to WR Jacoby Jones, but fell behind again when RB Clinton Portis got two 1-yard TD runs to put the Redskins up 20–7. The Texans tried to cut the lead in the third quarter as kicker Neil Rackers nailed a 47-yard field goal, but the Redskins increased their lead with QB Donovan McNabb completing a 22-yard TD pass to TE Chris Cooley. The Texans then went on a scoring rally to successfully cut the lead when QB Matt Schaub made a 6-yard TD pass to WR Kevin Walter, followed in the 4th quarter by Rackers making a 43-yard field goal. Then Schaub threw a 34-yard TD pass to WR Andre Johnson. The Texans pulled out the overtime victory, their first in franchise history, when Rackers booted a 35-yard field goal to win the game for the Texans by the score of 30–27.

With the win, Houston improved to 2–0.

==== Week 3: vs. Dallas Cowboys ====
Week 3: Dallas Cowboys at Houston Texans – Game summary

Quarter	1	2	3	4	Total
**Cowboys**	0	10	7	10	**27**
Texans	0	3	0	10	**13**

at Reliant Stadium, Houston, Texas

- Date: September 26
- Game time: 12:00 p.m. CDT
- Game weather: None (retractable roof closed)
- Game attendance: 71,456
- Referee: Carl Cheffers
- TV announcers (FOX): Joe Buck, Troy Aikman and Pam Oliver
- Recap

Game information

**First quarter**

- No scoring plays

**Second quarter**

- HOU – Neil Rackers 24-yard field goal, Texans 3–0, **Drive: 13 plays, 65 yards, 6:19.**
- DAL – Marion Barber 1-yard run (David Buehler kick), Cowboys 7–3, **Drive: 13 plays, 80 yards, 7:30.**
- DAL – David Buehler 49-yard field goal, Cowboys 10–3, **Drive: 7 plays, 32 yards, 1:40.**

**Third quarter**

- DAL – Roy E. Williams 15-yard pass from Tony Romo (David Buehler kick), Cowboys 17–3, **Drive: 7 plays, 90 yards, 4:02.**

**Fourth quarter**

- HOU – Neil Rackers 30-yard field goal, Cowboys 17–6, **Drive: 9 plays, 64 yards, 4:31.**
- DAL – Roy E. Williams 63-yard pass from Tony Romo (David Buehler kick), Cowboys 24–6, **Drive: 4 plays, 74 yards, 2:10.**
- DAL – David Buehler 40-yard field goal, Cowboys 27–6, **Drive: 10 plays, 29 yards, 5:28.**
- HOU – Kevin Walter 7-yard pass from Matt Schaub (Neil Rackers kick), Cowboys 27–13, **Drive: 9 plays, 77 yards, 2:21.**

**Top passers**

- DAL – Tony Romo – 23/30, 284 yards, 2 TD
- HOU – Matt Schaub – 23/32, 241 yards, TD, 2 INT

**Top rushers**

- DAL – Marion Barber – 17 rushes, 55 yards, TD
- HOU – Arian Foster – 17 rushes, 106 yards

**Top receivers**

- DAL – Roy E. Williams – 5 receptions, 117 yards, 2 TD
- HOU – Andre Johnson – 4 receptions, 64 yards

**Top tacklers**

- DAL – Terence Newman, Gerald Sensabaugh – 7 tackles
- HOU – Bernard Pollard – 6 tackles, 9 assists

Hoping to increase their winning streak the Texans played on home ground for an Inter-conference duel with the Cowboys. Houston took the early lead in the 1st quarter when kicker Neil Rackers hit a 24-yard field goal. Then they fell behind with RB Marion Barber getting a 1-yard TD run, followed by kicker David Buehler's 49-yard field goal. The Texans struggled further in the third quarter when QB Tony Romo completed a 15-yard TD pass to WR Roy E. Williams. Houston replied with Rackers nailing a 30-yard field goal, but Dallas continued to score when Romo found Williams again on a 63-yard TD pass. Then David Buehler made a 40-yard field goal. The Texans would finally score when QB Matt Schaub made a 7-yard TD pass to WR Kevin Walter.

With the loss, the Texans fell to 2–1.

==== Week 4: at Oakland Raiders ====
Week 4: Houston Texans at Oakland Raiders – Game summary

Quarter	1	2	3	4	Total
**Texans**	14	0	10	7	**31**
Raiders	7	7	0	10	**24**

at Oakland–Alameda County Coliseum, Oakland, California

- Date: October 3
- Game time: 3:05 p.m. CDT
- Game weather: 71 °F (22 °C) (Partly Cloudy)
- Game attendance: 32,218
- Referee: Scott Green
- TV announcers (CBS): Gus Johnson and Steve Tasker
- Recap

Game information

**First quarter**

- HOU – Derrick Ward 33-yard run (Neil Rackers kick), Texans 7–0, **Drive: 6 plays, 90 yards, 2:48.**
- OAK – Michael Bush 2-yard run (Sebastian Janikowski kick), Tied 7–7, **Drive: 8 plays, 80 yards, 3:52.**
- HOU – Joel Dreessen 11-yard pass from Matt Schaub (Neil Rackers kick), Texans 14–7, **Drive: 5 plays, 37 yards, 1:46.**

**Second quarter**

- OAK – Marcel Reece 13-yard pass from Bruce Gradkowski (Sebastian Janikowski kick), Tied 14–14, **Drive: 9 plays, 64 yards, 4:47.**

**Third quarter**

- HOU – Arian Foster 74-yard run (Neil Rackers kick), Texans 21–14, **Drive: 2 plays, 80 yards, 0:44.**
- HOU – Neil Rackers 35-yard field goal, Texans 24–14, **Drive: 13 plays, 73 yards, 7:40.**

**Fourth quarter**

- HOU – Arian Foster 10-yard pass from Matt Schaub (Neil Rackers kick), Texans 31–14, **Drive: 5 plays, 35 yards, 2:20.**
- OAK – Zach Miller 10-yard pass from Matt Schaub (Neil Rackers kick), Texans 31–21, **Drive: 9 plays, 87 yards, 3:58.**
- OAK – Sebastian Janikowski 39-yard field goal, Texans 31–24, **Drive: 10 plays, 61 yards, 3:43.**

**Top passers**

- HOU – Matt Schaub – 16/29, 192 yards, 2 TD
- OAK – Bruce Gradkowski – 24/39, 278 yards, 2 TD, 2 INT

**Top rushers**

- HOU – Arian Foster – 17 rushes, 133 yards, TD
- OAK – Darren McFadden – 12 rushes, 47 yards

**Top receivers**

- HOU – Joel Dreessen – 5 receptions, 73 yards, TD
- OAK – Zach Miller – 11 receptions, 122 yards, TD

**Top tacklers**

- HOU – Bernard Pollard – 8 tackles, 3 assists
- OAK – Michael Huff – 7 tackles, 1 assist

Hoping to rebound from their loss to the Cowboys the Texans flew to Oakland–Alameda County Coliseum for an AFC duel with the Raiders. The Texans took the early lead in the 1st quarter as RB Derrick Ward got a 33-yard TD run. The Raiders replied with RB Michael Bush making a 2-yard TD run. The Texans got the lead back when QB Matt Schaub completed an 11-yard TD pass to TE Joel Dreessen. The Raiders responded in the 2nd quarter with QB Bruce Gradkowski getting a 13-yard TD pass to FB Marcel Reece. In the 3rd quarter the Texans started to rally with RB Arian Foster making a 74-yard TD run, followed by kicker Neil Rackers getting a 35-yard field goal, then in the 4th quarter Schaub threw a 10-yard TD pass to RB Arian Foster. The lead was cut with Gradkowski found TE Zach Miller on a 14-yard TD pass, and kicker Sebastian Janikowski nailing a 39-yard field goal.

With the win, the Texans improved to 3–1.

==== Week 5: vs. New York Giants ====
Week 5: New York Giants at Houston Texans – Game summary

Quarter	1	2	3	4	Total
**Giants**	14	10	3	7	**34**
Texans	0	3	7	0	**10**

at Reliant Stadium, Houston, Texas

- Date: October 10
- Game time: 12:00 p.m. CDT
- Game weather: None (retractable roof closed)
- Game attendance: 71,110
- Referee: Walt Coleman
- TV announcers (Fox): Kenny Albert, Daryl Johnston and Tony Siragusa
- Recap

Game information

**First quarter**

- NYG – Hakeem Nicks 6-yard pass from Eli Manning (Lawrence Tynes kick), Giants 7–0, **Drive: 8 plays, 85 yards, 4:32.**
- NYG – Brandon Jacobs 1-yard run (Lawrence Tynes kick), Giants 14–0, **Drive: 4 plays, 40 yards, 1:59.**

**Second quarter**

- NYG – Haleem Nicks 12-yard pass from Eli Manning (Lawrence Tynes kick), Giants 21–0, **Drive: 6 plays, 55 yards, 2:58.**
- HOU – Neil Rackers 38-yard field goal, Giants 21–3, **Drive: 10 plays, 35 yards, 4:09.**
- NYG – Lawrence Tynes 45-yard field goal, Giants 24–3, **Drive: 12 plays, 70 yards, 4:09.**

**Third quarter**

- HOU – Derrick Ward 1-yard run (Neil Rackers kick), Giants 24–10, **Drive: 2 plays, 17 yards, 0:32.**
- NYG – Lawrence Tynes 42-yard field goal, Giants 27–10, **Drive: 11 plays, 47 yards, 5:38.**

**Fourth quarter**

- NYG – Steve Smith 4-yard pass from Eli Manning (Lawrence Tynes kick), Giants 34–10, **Drive: 9 plays, 73 yards, 5:12.**

**Top passers**

- NYG – Eli Manning – 27/42, 297 yards, 3 TD, 2 INT
- HOU – Matt Schaub – 16/34, 196 yards, INT

**Top rushers**

- NYG – Ahmad Bradshaw – 16 rushes, 67 yards
- HOU – Arian Foster – 11 rushes, 25 yards

**Top receivers**

- NYG – Hakeem Nicks – 12 receptions, 130 yards, 2 TD
- HOU – Andre Johnson – 5 receptions, 95 yards

**Top tacklers**

- NYG – Antrel Rolle, Terrel Thomas – 5 tackles, 1 assist
- HOU – DeMeco Ryans – 8 tackles, 3 assists

Coming off their win over the Raiders the Texans played on home ground for an Interconference duel with the Giants. In the first quarter the Texans trailed early when QB Eli Manning made a 6-yard TD pass to WR Hakeem Nicks. Then RB Brandon Jacobs got a 1-yard TD run. This was followed in the 2nd quarter by Manning finding Hicks again on a 12-yard TD pass. The Texans tried to cut the lead when kicker Neil Rackers hit a 38-yard field goal, which was responded by Lawrence Tynes' 45-yard field goal. The Texans' offense managed to break through in the third quarter when RB Derrick Ward got a 1-yard TD run, but was closed off after Tynes made a 42-yard field goal; followed by Manning completing a 4-yard TD pass to WR Steve Smith.

With the loss, Houston fell to 3–2.

==== Week 6: vs. Kansas City Chiefs ====
Week 6: Kansas City Chiefs at Houston Texans – Game summary

Quarter	1	2	3	4	Total
Chiefs	7	7	10	7	**31**
**Texans**	0	7	7	21	**35**

at Reliant Stadium, Houston, Texas

- Date: October 17
- Game time: 12:00 p.m. CDT
- Game weather: 78 °F (26 °C) (Partly Cloudy)
- Game attendance: 70,926
- Referee: Ron Winter
- TV announcers (CBS): Gus Johnson and Steve Tasker
- Recap

Game information

**First quarter**

- KC – Mike Vrabel 2-yard pass from Matt Cassel (Ryan Succop kick), Chiefs 7–0, **Drive: 15 plays, 74 yards, 8:37.**

**Second quarter**

- HOU – Joel Dreessen 5-yard pass from Matt Schaub (Neil Rackers kick), Tied 7–7, **Drive: 9 plays, 74 yards, 4:37.**
- KC – Dwayne Bowe 17-yard pass from Matt Cassel (Ryan Succop kick), Chiefs 14–7, **Drive: 7 plays, 63 yards, 2:00.**

**Third quarter**

- KC – Dwayne Bowe 42-yard pass from Matt Cassel (Ryan Succop kick), Chiefs 21–7, **Drive: 9 plays, 77 yards, 4:53.**
- HOU – Derrick Ward 38-yard run (Neil Rackers kick), Chiefs 21–14, **Drive: 3 plays, 66 yards, 1:17.**
- KC – Ryan Succop 24-yard field goal, Chiefs 24–14, **Drive: 9 plays, 65 yards, 4:04.**

**Fourth quarter**

- HOU – Arian Foster 2-yard run (Neil Rackers kick), Chiefs 24–21, **Drive: 11 plays, 46 yards, 5:52.**
- KC – Thomas Jones 11-yard run (Ryan Succop kick), Chiefs 31–21, **Drive: 9 plays, 70 yards, 5:01.**
- HOU – Arian Foster 1-yard run (Neil Rackers kick), Chiefs 31–28, **Drive: 8 plays, 86 yards, 3:35.**
- HOU – Andre Johnson 11-yard pass from Matt Schaub (Neil Rackers kick), Texans 35–31, **Drive: 9 plays, 80 yards, 1:54.**

**Top passers**

- KC – Matt Cassel – 20/29, 201 yards, 3 TD
- HOU – Matt Schaub – 25/33, 305 yards, 2 TD

**Top rushers**

- KC – Thomas Jones – 19 rushes, 100 yards, TD
- HOU – Arian Foster – 18 rushes, 71 yards, 2 TD

**Top receivers**

- KC – Dwayne Bowe – 6 receptions, 108 yards, 2 TD
- HOU – Andre Johnson – 8 receptions, 138 yards, TD

**Top tacklers**

- KC – Derrick Johnson – 6 tackles, 3 assists
- HOU – Eugene Wilson – 7 tackles, 3 assists

Hoping to rebound from their loss to the Giants the Texans played on home ground for an AFC duel against the Chiefs. In the first quarter the Chiefs took the early lead with QB Matt Cassel getting a 2-yard TD pass to OLB Mike Vrabel. The Texans responded and tied the game with QB Matt Schaub making a 5-yard TD pass to TE Joel Dreessen. The Chiefs rallied with Cassel making a 17 and then a 42-yard TD pass to WR Dwayne Bowe in the 3rd quarter. The Texans replied with RB Derrick Ward getting a 38-yard TD run. Then kicker Ryan Succop made a 24-yard field goal to put the Chiefs up 24–14. In the fourth quarter the Texans closed the gap with RB Arian Foster making a 2-yard TD run, but the Chiefs tried to pull away with RB Thomas Jones getting an 11-yard TD run. However, the Texans replied and eventually snatched the win with Foster making a 1-yard TD run, and then with Schaub finding WR Andre Johnson on an 11-yard TD pass.

With the win, Houston went into their bye week at 4–2.

==== Week 8: at Indianapolis Colts ====
Week 8: Houston Texans at Indianapolis Colts – Game summary

Quarter	1	2	3	4	Total
Texans	0	3	7	7	**17**
**Colts**	7	10	10	3	**30**

at Lucas Oil Stadium, Indianapolis, Indiana

- Date: November 1
- Game time: 7:30 p.m. CDT
- Game weather: None (retractable roof closed)
- Game attendance: 66,363
- Referee: Tony Corrente
- TV announcers (ESPN): Mike Tirico, Ron Jaworski, Jon Gruden, Suzy Kolber and Michele Tafoya
- Recap

Game information

**First quarter**

- IND – Jacob Tamme 2-yard pass from Peyton Manning (Adam Vinatieri kick), Colts 7–0, **Drive: 7 plays, 78 yards, 4:04.**

**Second quarter**

- IND – Kelvin Hayden 25-yard interception return (Adam Vinatieri kick), Colts 14–0.
- HOU – Neil Rackers 53-yard field goal, Colts 14–3, **Drive: 5 plays, 31 yards, 2:44.**
- IND – Adam Vinatieri 48-yard field goal, Colts 17–3, **Drive: 13 plays, 36 yards, 4:59.**

**Third quarter**

- IND – Reggie Wayne 15-yard pass from Peyton Manning (Adam Vinatieri kick), Colts 24–3, **Drive: 10 plays, 70 yards, 3:30.**
- HOU – Andre Johnson 28-yard pass from Matt Schaub (Neil Rackers kick), Colts 24–10, **Drive: 7 plays, 59 yards, 3:50.**
- IND – Adam Vinatieri 23-yard field goal, Colts 27–10, **Drive: 12 plays, 64 yards, 6:22.**

**Fourth quarter**

- HOU – Arian Foster 6-yard run (Neil Rackers kick), Colts 27–17, **Drive: 10 plays, 86 yards, 3:56.**
- IND – Adam Vinatieri 36-yard field goal, Colts 30–17, **Drive: 10 plays, 58 yards, 4:59.**

**Top passers**

- HOU – Matt Schaub – 22/38, 201 yards, TD, INT
- IND – Peyton Manning – 26/45, 268 yards, 2 TD

**Top rushers**

- HOU – Arian Foster – 15 rushes, 102 yards, 1 TD
- IND – Mike Hart – 12 rushes, 84 yards

**Top receivers**

- HOU – Andre Johnson – 7 receptions, 106 yards, TD
- IND – Pierre Garçon – 7 receptions, 78 yards

**Top tacklers**

- HOU – Zac Diles – 10 tackles, 1 assist
- IND – Clint Session – 8 tackles, 1 sack

Starting lineups: HOUSTON – DEFENSE: DE Antonio Smith, DT Shaun Cody, DT Amobi Okoye, DE Mario Williams, LB Brian Cushing, LB Kevin Bentley, LB Darryl Sharpton, CB Glover Quinn, CB Kareem Jackson, SS Bernard Pollard, FS Eugene Wilson.

Coming off their bye week the Texans played at Lucas Oil Stadium for an AFC South division rivalry match against the Indianapolis Colts. In the first quarter the Texans trailed early as QB Peyton Manning completed a 2-yard TD pass to TE Jacob Tamme. The Texans struggled further in the 2nd quarter when Matt Schaub's pass was intercepted by CB Kelvin Hayden and returned 25 yards for a touchdown. They soon responded with kicker Neil Rackers nailing a 53-yard field goal. The Texans fell further behind with kicker Adam Vinatieri getting a 48-yard field goal. This was followed in the third quarter by Manning throwing a 15-yard TD pass to WR Reggie Wayne. The Texans' offense broke through with Schaub connecting to WR Andre Johnson on a 28-yard TD pass. The Colts replied with Vinatieri hitting a 23-yard field goal. The Texans tried to fight back but only came away with a touchdown after RB Arian Foster got a 6-yard TD run. The Colts closed the game with Vinatieri making a 36-yard field goal.

With the loss, Houston fell to 4–3.

==== Week 9: vs. San Diego Chargers ====
Week 9: San Diego Chargers at Houston Texans – Game summary

Quarter	1	2	3	4	Total
**Chargers**	14	0	7	8	**29**
Texans	10	10	3	0	**23**

at Reliant Stadium, Houston, Texas

- Date: November 7
- Game time: 12:00 p.m. CST
- Game weather: 63 °F (17 °C) (Sunny)
- Game attendance: 70,886
- Referee: Mike Carey
- TV announcers (CBS): Ian Eagle and Dan Fouts
- Recap

Game information

**First quarter**

- HOU – Arian Foster 8-yard run (Neil Rackers kick), Texans 7–0, **Drive: 1 plays, 8 yards, 0:04.**
- SD – Seyi Ajirotutu 55-yard pass from Philip Rivers (Kris Brown kick), Tied 7–7, **Drive: 6 plays, 78 yards, 3:38.**
- HOU – Neil Rackers 27-yard field goal, Texans 10–7, **Drive: 10 plays, 64 yards, 4:41.**
- SD – Randy McMichael 11-yard pass from Philip Rivers (Kris Brown kick), Chargers 14–10, **Drive: 6 plays, 80 yards, 3:39.**

**Second quarter**

- HOU – Arian Foster 2-yard run (Neil Rackers kick), Texans 17–14, **Drive: 8 plays, 44 yards, 3:49.**
- HOU – Neil Rackers 21-yard field goal, Texans 20–14, **Drive: 12 plays, 87 yards, 6:16.**

**Third quarter**

- HOU – Neil Rackers 25-yard field goal, Texans 23–14, **Drive: 11 plays, 66 yards, 6:05.**
- SD – Randy McMichael 12-yard pass from Philip Rivers (Kris Brown kick), Texans 23–21, **Drive: 7 plays, 74 yards, 3:07.**

**Fourth quarter**

- SD – Seyi Ajirotutu 28-yard pass from Philip Rivers (Mike Tolbert run), Chargers 29–23, **Drive: 7 plays, 65 yards, 4:14.**

**Top passers**

- SD – Philip Rivers – 17/23, 295 yards, 4 TD, INT
- HOU – Matt Schaub – 21/32, 267 yards, INT

**Top rushers**

- SD – Ryan Mathews – 9 rushes, 42 yards
- HOU – Arian Foster – 27 rushes, 127 yards, 2 TD

**Top receivers**

- SD – Seyi Ajirotutu – 4 receptions, 111 yards, 2 TD
- HOU – Arian Foster – 4 receptions, 70 yards

**Top tacklers**

- SD – Antoine Cason, Eric Weddle – 7 tackles, 1 assist
- HOU – Bernard Pollard – 8 tackles, 1 forced fumble

Starting lineups: HOUSTON – OFFENSE: QB Matt Schaub, LT Duane Brown, LG Wade Smith, C Chris Myers, RG Mike Brisiel, RT Eric Winston, WR Andre Johnson, RB Arian Foster, FB Vonta Leach, TE Joel Dreessen, WR Kevin Walter. HOUSTON – DEFENSE: LDE Antonio Smith, DT Shaun Cody, DT Amobi Okoye, RDE Mario Williams, SLB Kevin Bentley, MLB Brian Cushing, WLB Zac Diles, CB Glover Quinn, CB Kareem Jackson, SS Bernard Pollard, FS Eugene Wilson.

The Texans' eighth game was an AFC duel with the Chargers. In the first quarter the Texans took the early lead as RB Arian Foster got an 8-yard TD run. The Chargers replied with QB Philip Rivers making a 55-yard TD pass to WR Seyi Ajirotutu. The Texans led again with kicker Neil Rackers nailing a 27-yard field goal, but fell behind after Rivers got an 11-yard TD pass to TE Randy McMichael. They took the lead in the second quarter as Foster made a 2-yard TD run, followed by Rackers hitting a 21 and a 25-yard field goal. The Texans lost the lead with Rivers finding McMichael again on a 12-yard TD pass. This was followed in the 4th quarter by Rivers' 28-yard TD pass to Ajirotutu (With a successful 2-point conversion as FB Mike Tolbert ran to the endzone).

With the loss, Houston fell to 4–4.

==== Week 10: at Jacksonville Jaguars ====
Week 10: Houston Texans at Jacksonville Jaguars – Game summary

Quarter	1	2	3	4	Total
Texans	3	0	14	7	**24**
**Jaguars**	3	14	0	14	**31**

at EverBank Field, Jacksonville, Florida

- Date: November 14
- Game time: 12:00 p.m. CST
- Game weather: 70 °F (21 °C) (Sunny)
- Game attendance: 62,340
- Referee: Gene Steratore
- TV announcers (CBS): Gus Johnson and Steve Tasker
- Recap

Game information

**First quarter**

- JAC – Josh Scobee 38-yard field goal, Jaguars 3–0, **Drive: 12 plays, 52 yards, 6:01.**
- HOU – Neil Rackers 24-yard field goal, Tied 3–3, **Drive: 10 plays, 69 yards, 4:28.**

**Second quarter**

- JAC – Maurice Jones-Drew 3-yard run (Josh Scobee kick), Jaguars 10–3, **Drive: 9 plays, 52 yards, 5:01.**
- JAC – Maurice Jones-Drew 9-yard run (Josh Scobee kick), Jaguars 17–3, **Drive: 6 plays, 55 yards, 1:13.**

**Third quarter**

- HOU – Arian Foster 1-yard run (Neil Rackers kick), Jaguars 17–10, **Drive: 6 plays, 80 yards, 3:41.**
- HOU – Andre Johnson 9-yard pass from Matt Schaub (Neil Rackers kick), Tied 17–17, **Drive: 8 plays, 80 yards, 3:30.**

**Fourth quarter**

- JAC – Zach Miller 52-yard pass from David Garrard (Josh Scobee kick), Jaguars 24–17, **Drive: 10 plays, 87 yards, 5:53.**
- HOU – Kevin Walter 18-yard pass from Matt Schaub (Neil Rackers kick), Tied 24–24, **Drive: 5 plays, 80 yards, 2:38.**
- JAC – Mike Thomas 50-yard pass from David Garrard (Josh Scobee kick), Jaguars 31–24, **Drive: 2 plays, 66 yards, 0:08.**

**Top passers**

- HOU – Matt Schaub – 22/32, 314 yards, 2 touchdowns
- JAC – David Garrard – 24/31, 342 yards, 2 touchdowns

**Top rushers**

- HOU – Arian Foster – 15 rushes, 56 yards, 1 touchdown
- JAC – Maurice Jones-Drew – 24 rushes, 100 yards, 2 touchdowns

**Top receivers**

- HOU – Andre Johnson – 9 receptions, 146 yards, 1 touchdown
- JAC – Mike Thomas – 8 receptions, 149 yards, 1 touchdown

**Top tacklers**

- HOU – Glover Quin – 13 tackles
- JAC – Courtney Greene – 7 tackles

The Texans' ninth match was an AFC South rivalry match against the Jaguars at EverBank Field. In the first quarter the Texans trailed early as kicker Josh Scobee hit a 38-yard field goal. They replied after kicker Neil Rackers made a 24-yard field goal. They trailed again in the 2nd quarter with RB Maurice Jones-Drew getting a 3 and a 9-yard TD run. However, the lead didn't last long after RB Arian Foster got a 1-yard TD run, and QB Matt Schaub threw a 9-yard TD pass to WR Andre Johnson. The Jaguars stayed in the lead when QB David Garrard completed a 52-yard TD pass to TE Zach Miller, but the Texans replied again with Schaub finding WR Kevin Walter on an 18-yard TD pass. Suddenly, the Texans' defense broke through with only a few seconds remaining after Garrard made a 50-yard Hail Mary pass to WR Mike Thomas. The ball was batted into his hands by Texans Defensive back Glover Quin, who made an attempt to bat the ball to the ground.

With the loss, the Texans fell to 4–5.

==== Week 11: at New York Jets ====
Week 11: Houston Texans at New York Jets – Game summary

Quarter	1	2	3	4	Total
Texans	0	7	0	20	**27**
**Jets**	3	10	7	10	**30**

at New Meadowlands Stadium, East Rutherford, New Jersey

- Date: November 21
- Game time: 1:00 p.m. EST
- Game weather: 46 °F (8 °C) (Sunny)
- Game attendance: 78,843
- Referee: Jerome Boger
- TV announcers (CBS): Greg Gumbel & Dan Dierdorf
- https://www.nfl.com/gamecenter/2010112101/2010/REG11/texans@jets

Game information

**First quarter**

- NYJ – Nick Folk 37-yard field goal, Jets 3–0, **Drive: 6 plays, 10 yards, 1:47.**

**Second quarter**

- HOU – Arian Foster 2-yard run (Neil Rackers kick), Texans 7–3, **Drive: 11 plays, 67 yards, 5:35.**
- NYJ – Braylon Edwards 4-yard pass from Mark Sanchez (Nick Folk kick), Jets 10–7, **Drive: 10 plays, 78 yards, 4:59.**
- NYJ – Nick Folk 33-yard field goal, Jets 13–7, **Drive: 8 plays, 33 yards, 3:15.**

**Third quarter**

- NYJ – Santonio Holmes 41-yard pass from Mark Sanchez (Nick Folk kick), Jets 20–7, **Drive: 9 plays, 92 yards, 4:06.**

**Fourth quarter**

- NYJ – Nick Folk 30-yard field goal, Jets 23–7, **Drive: 4 plays, 10 yards, 1:28.**
- HOU – Neil Rackers 38-yard field goal, Jets 23–10, **Drive: 7 plays, 59 yards, 2:30.**
- HOU – Joel Dreessen 43-yard pass from Matt Schaub (Neil Rackers kick), Jets 23–17, **Drive: 1 plays, 43 yards, 0:09.**
- HOU – Arian Foster 1-yard run (Neil Rackers kick), Texans 24–23, **Drive: 7 plays, 73 yards, 3:51.**
- HOU – Neil Rackers 22-yard field goal, Texans 27–23, **Drive: 4 plays, 6 yards, 0:57.**
- NYJ – Santonio Holmes 6-yard pass from Mark Sanchez (Nick Folk kick), Jets 30–27, **Drive: 5 plays, 72 yards, 0:45.**

**Top passers**

- HOU – Matt Schaub – 19/33, 254 yards, 1 touchdown
- NYJ – Mark Sanchez – 22/38, 315 yards, 3 touchdowns, 1 interception

**Top rushers**

- HOU – Arian Foster – 22 rushes, 84 yards, 2 touchdowns
- NYJ – Shonn Greene – 15 rushes, 42 yards

**Top receivers**

- HOU – Joel Dreessen – 4 receptions, 106 yards, 1 touchdown
- NYJ – Santonio Holmes – 7 receptions, 126 yards, 2 touchdowns

**Top tacklers**

- HOU – Kevin Bentley – 6 tackles, 2 assisted, 1 interception
- NYJ – Brodney Pool – 7 tackles

Starting lineups: HOUSTON – OFFENSE: QB Matt Schaub, LT Duane Brown, LG Wade Smith, C Chris Myers, RG Mike Brisiel, RT Eric Winston, WR Andre Johnson, RB Arian Foster, FB Vonta Leach, TE Joel Dreessen, WR Kevin Walter. HOUSTON – DEFENSE: LDE Antonio Smith, NT Shaun Cody, DT Amobi Okoye, RDE Mario Williams, SLB Brian Cushing, MLB Kevin Bentley, WLB Darryl Sharpton, LCB Glover Quinn, RCB Kareem Jackson, SS Bernard Pollard, FS Eugene Wilson. In an attempt to break a three-game losing streak the Texans flew to New Meadowlands Stadium for an AFC duel with the Jets. In the first quarter the Texans trailed early as kicker Nick Folk nailed a 37-yard field goal. They replied in the second quarter with RB Arian Foster getting a 2-yard TD run. The Texans struggled further as QB Mark Sanchez threw a 4-yard TD pass to WR Santonio Holmes; followed by Folk making a 30-yard field goal. The Jets' lead extended in the third quarter with Sanchez found Holmes again on a 41-yard TD pass. In the fourth quarter Folk made a 30-yard field goal to put the Jets up 23–7. The Texans rallied to take the lead back with kicker Neil Rackers nailing a 38-yard field goal, followed by QB Matt Schaub completing a 43-yard TD pass to TE Joel Dreessen, followed by Foster getting a 1-yard TD run, and then Rackers got a 22-yard field goal. The Texans' defense however broke through with Sanchez finding Holmes again on a 6-yard TD pass.

With the loss, Houston fell to 4–6.

==== Week 12: vs. Tennessee Titans ====
Week 12: Tennessee Titans at Houston Texans – Game summary

Quarter	1	2	3	4	Total
Titans	0	0	0	0	**0**
**Texans**	0	14	3	3	**20**

at Reliant Stadium, Houston, Texas

- Date: November 28
- Game time: 12:00 p.m. CST
- Game weather: 58 °F (14 °C) (Mostly Cloudy)
- Game attendance: 70,855
- Referee: Clete Blakeman
- TV announcers (CBS): Ian Eagle and Dan Fouts
- Recap

Game information

**First quarter**

**Second quarter**

- HOU – Joel Dreessen 1-yard pass from Matt Schaub (Neil Rackers kick), Texans 7–0, **Drive: 4 plays, 25 yards, 2:02.**
- HOU – Andre Johnson 2-yard pass from Matt Schaub (Neil Rackers kick), Texans 14–0, **Drive: 9 plays, 71 yards, 5:06.**

**Third quarter**

- HOU – Neil Rackers 35-yard field goal, Texans 17–0, **Drive: 11 plays, 49 yards, 5:24.**

**Fourth quarter**

- HOU – Neil Rackers 33-yard field goal, Texans 20–0, **Drive: 14 plays, 80 yards, 8:27.**

**Top passers**

- TEN – Rusty Smith – 17/31, 138 yards, 3 interceptions
- HOU – Matt Schaub – 25/35, 178 yards, 2 touchdowns

**Top rushers**

- TEN – Javon Ringer – 4 rushes, 27 yards
- HOU – Arian Foster – 30 rushes, 143 yards

**Top receivers**

- TEN – Justin Gage – 4 receptions, 50 yards
- HOU – Arian Foster – 9 receptions, 75 yards

**Top tacklers**

- TEN – Stephen Tulloch – 11 tackles, 3 assists
- HOU – Brian Cushing – 6 tackles, 1 assist

Starting lineups: HOUSTON – OFFENSE: QB Matt Schaub, LT Duane Brown, LG Wade Smith, C Chris Myers, RG Mike Brisiel, RT Eric Winston, WR Andre Johnson, RB Arian Foster, FB Vonta Leach, TE Joel Dreessen, WR Kevin Walter. Hoping to snap a four-game losing streak the Texans played on home ground for an AFC South rivalry match against the Titans. The Texans took control throughout the game as QB Matt Schaub got a 1-yard TD pass to TE Joel Dreessen, followed by his 2-yard TD pass to WR Andre Johnson. The lead was increased when kicker Neil Rackers hit a 35 and a 33-yard field goal.

With the easy win, the Texans improved to 5–6. However, in the fourth quarter, Johnson was ejected following a fight with Titans CB Cortland Finnegan, who was also ejected.

This was the Texans first shutout win since 2004, and they would not have a shutout win again until 2025, which was also a home game against the Titans.

==== Week 13: at Philadelphia Eagles ====
Week 13: Houston Texans at Philadelphia Eagles – Game summary

Quarter	1	2	3	4	Total
Texans	3	7	14	0	**24**
**Eagles**	7	13	0	14	**34**

at Lincoln Financial Field, Philadelphia, Pennsylvania

- Date: December 2
- Game time: 7:20 p.m. CST
- Game weather: 36 °F (2 °C) (Partly Cloudy)
- Game attendance: 69,144
- Referee: Walt Anderson
- TV announcers (NFLN): Bob Papa, Matt Millen and Joe Theismann
- Recap

Game information

**First quarter**

- PHI – LeSean McCoy 1-yard pass from Michael Vick (David Akers kick), Eagles 7–0, **Drive: 11 plays, 88 yards, 7:04.**
- HOU – Neil Rackers 48-yard field goal, Eagles 7–3, **Drive: 7 plays, 39 yards, 3:01.**

**Second quarter**

- PHI – LeSean McCoy 4-yard run (David Akers kick), Eagles 14–3, **Drive: 11 plays, 72 yards, 5:25.**
- PHI – David Akers 36-yard field goal, Eagles 17–3, **Drive: 7 plays, 51 yards, 3:16.**
- HOU – Jacoby Jones 8-yard pass from Matt Schaub (Neil Rackers kick), Eagles 17–10, **Drive: 8 plays, 80 yards, 3:57.**
- PHI – David Akers 22-yard field goal, Eagles 20–10, **Drive: 7 plays, 14 yards, 0:59.**

**Third quarter**

- HOU – Arian Foster 13-yard pass from Matt Schaub (Neil Rackers kick), Eagles 20–17, **Drive: 11 plays, 79 yards, 6:11.**
- HOU – Arian Foster 3-yard run (Neil Rackers kick), Texans 24–20, **Drive: 13 plays, 86 yards, 6:23.**

**Fourth quarter**

- PHI – Michael Vick 2-yard run (David Akers kick), Eagles 27–24, **Drive: 6 plays, 60 yards, 2:46.**
- PHI – Owen Schmitt 5-yard pass from Michael Vick (David Akers kick), Eagles 34–24, **Drive: 8 plays, 72 yards, 5:52.**

**Top passers**

- HOU – Matt Schaub – 22/36, 337 yards, 2 touchdowns, 1 interception
- PHI – Michael Vick – 22/33, 302 yards, 2 touchdowns, 1 interception

**Top rushers**

- HOU – Arian Foster – 22 rushes, 83 yards, 1 touchdown
- PHI – Michael Vick – 10 rushes, 48 yards

**Top receivers**

- HOU – Andre Johnson – 6 receptions, 149 yards
- PHI – LeSean McCoy – 8 receptions, 86 yards, 1 touchdown

**Top tacklers**

- HOU – Jason Allen – 9 tackles, 1 interception
- PHI – Quintin Mikell – 7 tackles

Starting lineups:

HOUSTON – OFFENSE: QB Matt Schaub, LT Duane Brown, LG Wade Smith, C Chris Myers, RG Mike Brisiel, RT Eric Winston, WR Andre Johnson, RB Arian Foster, FB Vonta Leach, TE Joel Dreessen, WR Kevin Walter. HOUSTON – DEFENSE: DE Antonio Smith, DT Shaun Cody, DT Amobi Okoye, DE Mario Williams, LB Brian Cushing, LB Kevin Bentley, LB Darryl Sharpton, CB Glover Quinn, CB Kareem Jackson, SS Bernard Pollard, FS Eugene Wilson. Coming off their shutout win over the Titans, the Texans flew to Lincoln Financial Field for a Week 13 interconference duel with the Philadelphia Eagles on Thursday night. Houston trailed early in the first quarter as Eagles quarterback Michael Vick completed a 1-yard touchdown pass to running back LeSean McCoy. The Texans answered with a 48-yard field goal from kicker Neil Rackers, but Philadelphia struck back with McCoy getting a 4-yard touchdown run, followed by kicker David Akers getting a 36-yard field goal. Houston replied with quarterback Matt Schaub finding wide receiver Jacoby Jones on an 8-yard touchdown pass. The Eagles would close out the half with Akers making a 22-yard field goal.

The Texans took the lead in the third quarter with running back Arian Foster catching a 13-yard touchdown pass from Schaub and getting a 3-yard touchdown run. Philadelphia regained the lead with Vick getting a 2-yard touchdown run, followed by his 5-yard touchdown pass to fullback Owen Schmitt. Houston tried to rally, but the Eagles' defense prevented any progress.

With the loss, the Texans fell to 5–7.

==== Week 14: vs. Baltimore Ravens ====
Battle Red Day

Week 14: Baltimore Ravens at Houston Texans – Game summary

Quarter	1	2	3	4	OT	Total
**Ravens**	7	14	7	0	6	**34**
Texans	0	7	6	15	0	**28**

at Reliant Stadium, Houston, Texas

- Date: December 13
- Game time: 8:30 p.m. EST
- Game weather: None (Dome Closed)
- Referee: Bill Leavy
- TV announcers (ESPN): Mike Tirico, Ron Jaworski, Jon Gruden, Suzy Kolber and Michele Tafoya
- Recap

Game information

**First quarter**

- BAL – Willis McGahee 1-yard run (Billy Cundiff kick), Ravens 7–0, **Drive: 8 plays, 52 yards, 3:55.**

**Second quarter**

- BAL – Derrick Mason 9-yard pass from Joe Flacco (Billy Cundiff kick), Ravens 14–0, **Drive: 6 plays, 44 yards, 3:15.**
- BAL – Derrick Mason 26-yard pass from Joe Flacco (Billy Cundiff kick), Ravens 21–0, **Drive: 4 plays, 38 yards, 0:34.**
- HOU – Andre Johnson 46-yard pass from Matt Schaub (Neil Rackers kick), Ravens 21–7, **Drive: 7 plays, 80 yards, 0:55.**

**Third quarter**

- BAL – David Reed 103-yard kickoff return (Billy Cundiff kick), Ravens 28–7, **Drive: 0 plays, 0 yards, 0:15.**
- HOU – Neil Rackers 24-yard field goal, Ravens 28–10, **Drive: 16 plays, 70 yards, 7:37.**
- HOU – Neil Rackers 42-yard field goal, Ravens 28–13, **Drive: 10 plays, 42 yards, 4:28.**

**Fourth quarter**

- HOU – Jacoby Jones 7-yard pass from Matt Schaub (Neil Rackers kick), Ravens 28–20, **Drive: 15 plays, 99 yards, 5:03.**
- HOU – Andre Johnson 5-yard pass from Matt Schaub (Matt Schaub – Jacoby Jones pass), Tied 28–28, **Drive: 12 plays, 95 yards, 2:21.**

**Overtime**

- BAL – Josh Wilson 12-yard interception return, Ravens 34–28.

**Top passers**

- BAL – Joe Flacco – 22/33, 235 yards, 2 touchdowns
- HOU – Matt Schaub – 31/62, 393 yards, 3 touchdowns, 2 interceptions

**Top rushers**

- BAL – Ray Rice – 19 rushes, 54 yards
- HOU – Arian Foster – 20 rushes, 100 yards

**Top receivers**

- BAL – Derrick Mason – 6 receptions, 78 yards, 2 touchdowns
- HOU – Andre Johnson – 9 receptions, 140 yards, 2 touchdowns

**Top tacklers**

- BAL – Josh Wilson – 7 tackles, 1 interception
- HOU – Kevin Bentley – 6 tackles, 5 assists

Hoping to rebound from their road loss to the Eagles, the Texans went home, donned their alternate uniforms, and played a Week 14 Monday night duel with the Baltimore Ravens. Houston trailed in the first quarter as Ravens running back Willis McGahee got a 1-yard touchdown run. Baltimore added onto their lead in the second quarter as quarterback Joe Flacco completed a 9-yard and a 26-yard touchdown pass to wide receiver Derrick Mason. The Texans would answer with quarterback Matt Schaub finding wide receiver Andre Johnson on a 46-yard touchdown pass.

The Ravens struck back in the third quarter as wide receiver David Reed returned the second half's opening kickoff 103 yards for a touchdown. Houston continued to hang around with a 24-yard and a 42-yard field goal from kicker Neil Rackers. The Texans tied the game in the fourth quarter as Schaub connected with wide receiver Jacoby Jones on a 7-yard touchdown pass, followed by a 5-yard touchdown pass to Johnson and a successful two-point conversion pass to Jones and the game headed to overtime.

The Ravens won the toss, but failed to advance the ball and punted to the Texans 9. On the second play, Schaub's pass was intercepted by Josh Wilson, who ran untouched into the end zone.

With the loss, not only did Houston fall to 5–8, but they became the first team in NFL history to have four games where they have come back and either tie or the lead, only to end up losing the game.

==== Week 15: at Tennessee Titans ====
Week 15: Houston Texans at Tennessee Titans – Game summary

Quarter	1	2	3	4	Total
Texans	0	3	7	7	**17**
**Titans**	21	3	7	0	**31**

at LP Field, Nashville, Tennessee

- Date: December 19
- Game time: 12:00 p.m. CST
- Game weather: 36 °F (2 °C) (Sunny and Cold)
- Game attendance: 69,143
- Referee: Gene Steratore
- TV announcers (CBS): Kevin Harlan and Solomon Wilcots
- Recap

Game information

**First quarter**

- TEN – Nate Washington 3-yard pass from Kerry Collins (Rob Bironas kick), Titans 7–0, **Drive: 9 plays, 60 yards, 4:40.**
- TEN – Justin Gage 1-yard pass from Kerry Collins (Rob Bironas kick), Titans 14–0, **Drive: 5 plays, 61 yards, 2:13.**
- TEN – Chris Johnson 11-yard run (Rob Bironas kick), Titans 21–0, **Drive: 6 plays, 44 yards, 2:01.**

**Second quarter**

- HOU – Neil Rackers 37-yard field goal, Titans 21–3, **Drive: 12 plays, 38 yards, 5:27.**
- TEN – Rob Bironas 30-yard field goal, Titans 24–3, **Drive: 4 plays, 10 yards, 0:47.**

**Third quarter**

- HOU – Andre Johnson 12-yard pass from Matt Schaub (Neil Rackers kick), Titans 24–10, **Drive: 10 plays, 66 yards, 5:43.**
- TEN – Javon Ringer 7-yard run (Rob Bironas kick), Titans 31–10, **Drive: 6 plays, 80 yards, 2:46.**

**Fourth quarter**

- HOU – Kevin Walter 4-yard pass from Matt Schaub (Neil Rackers kick), Titans 31–17, **Drive: 13 plays, 83 yards, 4:27.**

**Top passers**

- HOU – Matt Schaub – 35/54, 325 yards, 2 touchdowns, 1 interception
- TEN – Kerry Collins – 14/24, 237 yards, 2 touchdowns, 1 interception

**Top rushers**

- HOU – Arian Foster – 11 rushes, 15 yards
- TEN – Chris Johnson – 24 rushes, 130 yards, 1 touchdown

**Top receivers**

- HOU – Kevin Walter – 7 receptions, 70 yards, 1 touchdown
- TEN – Kenny Britt – 6 receptions, 128 yards

**Top tacklers**

- HOU – Bernard Pollard – 4 tackles, 2 assists
- TEN – Stephen Tulloch – 8 tackles, 1 assist

Hoping to break a two-game losing streak the Texans flew to LP Field for an AFC South rivalry rematch against the Titans. The Texans trailed early after QB Kerry Collins threw a 3 and a 1-yard TD pass to WR Nate Washington and to WR Justin Gage. This was followed by RB Chris Johnson getting an 11-yard TD run. The Texans got on the scoreboard after kicker Neil Rackers made a 37-yard field goal, but fell further behind after kicker Rob Bironas hit a 30-yard field goal. The Texans tried to cut the lead with QB Matt Schaub getting a 12-yard TD pass to WR Andre Johnson, but the Titans would pull away with RB Javon Ringer getting a 7-yard TD run. The Texans tried to come back into the game, but only came away with Schaub throwing a 4-yard TD pass to WR Kevin Walter.

With the loss, the Texans fell to 5–9, and were officially eliminated from postseason contention.

==== Week 16: at Denver Broncos ====
Week 16: Houston Texans at Denver Broncos – Game summary

Quarter	1	2	3	4	Total
Texans	7	10	6	0	**23**
**Broncos**	0	0	10	14	**24**

at INVESCO Field at Mile High, Denver, Colorado

- Date: December 26
- Game time: 3:05 p.m. CST
- Game weather: 50 °F (10 °C) (Partly Cloudy)
- Game attendance: 73,691
- Referee: Ron Winter
- TV announcers (CBS): Don Criqui and Steve Beuerlein
- Recap

Game information

**First quarter**

- HOU – Arian Foster 3-yard run (Neil Rackers kick), Texans 7–0, **Drive: 6 plays, 91 yards, 3:11.**

**Second quarter**

- HOU – Owen Daniels 3-yard pass from Matt Schaub (Neil Rackers kick), Texans 14–0, **Drive: 6 plays, 86 yards, 3:42.**
- HOU – Neil Rackers 34-yard field goal, Texans 17–0, **Drive: 8 plays, 37 yards, 3:42.**

**Third quarter**

- DEN – Correll Buckhalter 6-yard run (Steven Hauschka kick), Texans 17–7, **Drive: 4 plays, 80 yards, 2:02.**
- HOU – Neil Rackers 54-yard field goal, Texans 20–7, **Drive: 7 plays, 44 yards, 2:44.**
- DEN – Steven Hauschka 57-yard field goal, Texans 20–10, **Drive: 7 plays, 71 yards, 3:08.**
- HOU – Neil Rackers 57-yard field goal, Texans 23–10, **Drive: 8 plays, 42 yards, 4:32.**

**Fourth quarter**

- DEN – Correl Buckhalter 23-yard pass from Tim Tebow (Steven Hauschka kick), Texans 23–17, **Drive: 12 plays, 74 yards, 6:39.**
- DEN – Tim Tebow 6-yard run (Steven Hauschka kick), Broncos 24–23, **Drive: 12 plays, 76 yards, 4:40.**

**Top passers**

- HOU – Matt Schaub – 23/33, 310 yards, 1 touchdown, 1 interception
- DEN – Tim Tebow – 16/29, 308 yards, 1 touchdown, 1 interception

**Top rushers**

- HOU – Arian Foster – 19 rushes, 91 yards, 1 touchdown
- DEN – Correll Buckhalter – 11 rushes, 42 yards, 1 touchdown

**Top receivers**

- HOU – Jacoby Jones – 5 receptions, 115 yards
- DEN – Brandon Lloyd – 5 receptions, 111 yards

**Top tacklers**

- HOU – Glover Quin – 8 tackles
- DEN – Brian Dawkins, Wesley Woodyard – 8 tackles, 1 assist

The Texans' fifteenth game was an AFC duel with the Broncos. The Texans commanded the first half with RB Arian Foster getting a 3-yard TD run, followed by QB Matt Schaub getting a 3-yard TD pass to TE Owen Daniels, then with kicker Neil Rackers hitting a 34-yard field goal. The Broncos got on the board with RB Correll Buckhalter getting a 3-yard TD run, but the Texans scored again with Rackers nailing a 54-yard field goal. The Broncos replied as kicker Steven Hauschka got a 27-yard field goal, but the Texans extended their lead with Rackers hitting a 57-yard field goal. However, they failed to maintain this lead after QB Tim Tebow completed a 23-yard TD pass to Buckhalter, followed by Tebow scrambling 6-yards for a touchdown.

With the close loss, the Texans fell to 5–10.

==== Week 17: vs. Jacksonville Jaguars ====
Week 17: Jacksonville Jaguars at Houston Texans – Game summary

Quarter	1	2	3	4	Total
Jaguars	0	17	0	0	**17**
**Texans**	10	10	7	7	**34**

at Reliant Stadium, Houston, Texas

- Date: January 2
- Game time: 3:15 p.m. CST
- Game weather: 60 °F (16 °C) (Sunny)
- Game attendance: 71,023
- Referee: Jeff Triplette
- TV announcers (CBS): Greg Gumbel and Dan Dierdorf

Game information

**First quarter**

**Second quarter**

**Third quarter**

**Fourth quarter**

**Top passers**

- JAC – Trent Edwards 12–25, 140 yds, 1 td
- HOU – Matt Schaub 18–22, 253 yds, 1 td

**Top rushers**

- JAC – Rashad Jennings 22 car, 108 yds, 1 td
- HOU – Arian Foster 31 car, 180 yds, 2 tds

**Top receivers**

- JAC – Jason Hill 3 rec, 68 yds, 0 tds
- HOU – Jacoby Jones 5 rec, 70 yds, 0 tds

The Texans' final game was a division rivalry rematch against the Jaguars. The Texans took the lead as RB Arian Foster got a 2-yard TD run, followed by kicker Neil Rackers making a 26-yard field goal. The Jaguars responded with RB Rashad Jennings getting a 3-yard TD run, but Houston scored further as RB Derrick Ward made a 35-yard TD run. The Jaguars managed to tie the game with kicker Josh Scobee hitting a 39-yard field goal, followed by Edwards completing a 7-yard TD pass to Marcedes Lewis. However, the Texans pulled away from the tie with Rackers making a 33-yard field goal, followed by QB Matt Schaub completing a 5-yard TD pass to TE Owen Daniels, then with Foster getting a 35-yard TD run.

With the win, Houston ended their season with a 6–10 record.

== Statistics ==
=== Team ===
Category	Total yards	Yards per game	NFL rank (out of 32)
Passing offense	4,144	259.0	4th
Rushing offense	2,042	127.6	7th
Total offense	6,186	386.6	3rd
Passing defense	4,280	267.5	32nd
Rushing defense	1,751	109.4	13th
Total defense	6,031	376.9	30th

=== Individual ===
Category	Player	Total
Offense
Passing yards	Matt Schaub	4,370
Passing touchdowns	Matt Schaub	24
Rushing yards	Arian Foster	1,616
Rushing touchdowns	Arian Foster	16
Receiving yards	Andre Johnson	1,216
Receiving touchdowns	Andre Johnson	8
Defense
Tackles (Solo)	Bernard Pollard	81
Sacks	Mario Williams	8.5
Interceptions	Jason Allen	6
