= Houston Texans draft history =

The following list contains all NFL draft selections made by the National Football League's Houston Texans franchise since the team's inception into the league in 2002. Included in the list is the 2002 NFL expansion draft.

== Drafts by year ==
= Pro Bowler

* Asterisk indicates a player who was selected to the Pro Bowl only as a member of another team.

=== Expansion draft ===
Round	Player	Position	Team
1	Tony Boselli*	OT	Jacksonville Jaguars
2	Ryan Young	OT	New York Jets
3	Aaron Glenn	CB	New York Jets
4	Gary Walker	DT	Jacksonville Jaguars
5	Jamie Sharper	LB	Baltimore Ravens
6	Jermaine Lewis*	WR	Baltimore Ravens
7	Marcus Coleman	DB	New York Jets
8	Seth Payne	DT	Jacksonville Jaguars
9	Matt Campbell	OG	Washington Redskins
10	Matt Stevens	S	New England Patriots
11	Jeremy McKinney	OG	Cleveland Browns
12	Ryan Schau	OG	Philadelphia Eagles
13	Charlie Rogers	RB	Seattle Seahawks
14	Sean McDermott	TE	Tampa Bay Buccaneers
15	Jabari Issa	DE	Arizona Cardinals
16	Avion Black	WR	Buffalo Bills
17	Danny Wuerffel	QB	Chicago Bears
18	Brian Allen	LB	St. Louis Rams
19	Johnny Huggins	TE	Dallas Cowboys

=== 2002 ===
Round	Pick	Player	Position	College	Notes
1	1	David Carr	QB	Fresno State	
2	33	Jabar Gaffney	WR	Florida	
2	50	Chester Pitts	OG	San Diego State	
3	66	Fred Weary	OG	Tennessee	
3	83	Charles Hill	DT	Maryland	
4	99	Jonathan Wells	RB	Ohio State	
5	136	Jarrod Baxter	FB	New Mexico	
5	153	Ramon Walker	S	Pittsburgh	
6	173	Demarcus Faggins	CB	Kansas State	
6	190	Howard Green	DT	LSU	
6	0	Milford Brown	OG	Florida State	Supplemental Draft
7	229	Stylez G. White	DE	Minnesota	
7	261	Ahmad Miller	DT	UNLV	

=== 2003 ===
Round	Pick	Player	Position	College	Notes
1	3	Andre Johnson	WR	Miami (FL)	
2	41	Bennie Joppru	TE	Michigan	from New England
2	0	Tony Hollings	RB	Georgia Tech	Supplemental Draft
3	67	Antwan Peek	LB	Cincinnati	
3	75	Seth Wand	OT	NW Missouri State	from New England
3	88	Dave Ragone	QB	Louisville	from Atlanta
4	101	Domanick Davis	RB	LSU	
6	192	Drew Henson	QB	Michigan	
6	214	Keith Wright	DT	Missouri	
7	217	Curry Burns	S	Louisville	
7	233	Chance Pearce	C	Texas A&M	

=== 2004 ===
Round	Pick	Player	Position	College	Notes
1	10	Dunta Robinson	CB	South Carolina	
1	27	Jason Babin*	DE	Western Michigan	from Tennessee
4	122	Glenn Earl	S	Notre Dame	from Indianapolis
6	170	Vontez Duff	CB	Notre Dame	
6	175	Jammal Lord	S	Nebraska	from Jacksonville
7	210	Raheem Orr	LB	Rutgers	
7	211	Sloan Thomas	WR	Texas	
7	248	B. J. Symons	QB	Texas Tech	

=== 2005 ===
Round	Pick	Player	Position	College	Notes
1	16	Travis Johnson	DT	Florida State	from New Orleans
3	73	Vernand Morency	RB	Oklahoma State	from Dallas
4	114	Jerome Mathis	WR	Hampton	
5	151	Drew Hodgdon	C	Arizona State	
6	188	C.C. Brown	S	Louisiana-Lafayette	
7	277	Kenneth Pettway	LB	Grambling	

=== 2006 ===
Round	Pick	Player	Position	College	Notes
1	1	Mario Williams	DE	North Carolina State	
2	33	DeMeco Ryans	LB	Alabama	
3	65	Charles Spencer	OT	Pittsburgh	
3	66	Eric Winston	OT	Miami (FL)	from New Orleans
4	98	Owen Daniels	TE	Wisconsin	
6	170	Wali Lundy	RB	Virginia	
7	251	David Anderson	WR	Colorado State	

=== 2007 ===
Round	Pick	Player	Position	College	Notes
1	10	Amobi Okoye	DT	Louisville	from Atlanta
3	73	Jacoby Jones*	WR	Lane	
4	123	Fred Bennett	CB	South Carolina	from New Orleans
5	144	Brandon Harrison	S	Stanford	
5	163	Brandon Frye	OT	Virginia Tech	from New Orleans
6	183	Kasey Studdard	OG	Texas	
7	218	Zac Diles	LB	Kansas State	

=== 2008 ===
Round	Pick	Player	Position	College	Notes
1	26	Duane Brown	OT	Virginia Tech	from Baltimore
3	79	Antwaun Molden	CB	Eastern Kentucky	
3	89	Steve Slaton	RB	West Virginia	from Baltimore
4	118	Xavier Adibi	LB	Virginia Tech	
5	151	Frank Okam	DT	Texas	
6	173	Dominique Barber	S	Minnesota	from Baltimore
7	223	Alex Brink	QB	Washington State	

=== 2009 ===
Round	Pick	Player	Position	College	Notes
1	15	Brian Cushing	LB	Southern California	
2	46	Connor Barwin*	DE	Cincinnati	
3	77	Antoine Caldwell	C	Alabama	
4	112	Glover Quin*	CB	New Mexico	
4	122	Anthony Hill	TE	North Carolina State	from Minnesota
5	152	James Casey	TE	Rice	
6	188	Brice McCain	CB	Utah	
7	223	Troy Nolan	S	Arizona State	

=== 2010 ===
Round	Pick	Player	Position	College	Notes
1	20	Kareem Jackson	CB	Alabama	
2	58	Ben Tate	RB	Auburn	from New England
3	81	Earl Mitchell	DT	Arizona	
4	102	Darryl Sharpton	LB	Miami (FL)	from Kansas City
4	118	Garrett Graham	TE	Wisconsin	
5	144	Sherrick McManis	CB	Northwestern	from Kansas City
6	187	Shelley Smith	OG	Colorado State	
6	197	Trindon Holliday	WR	LSU	from San Diego
7	227	Dorin Dickerson	TE	Pittsburgh	

=== 2011 ===
Round	Pick	Player	Position	College	Notes
1	11	J. J. Watt	DE	Wisconsin	
2	42	Brooks Reed	LB	Arizona	
2	60	Brandon Harris	CB	Miami (FL)	from New England
4	127	Rashad Carmichael	CB	Virginia Tech	from Washington
5	144	Shiloh Keo	S	Idaho	from Washington
5	152	T. J. Yates	QB	North Carolina	from Washington
7	214	Derek Newton	OT	Arkansas State	
7	254	Cheta Ozougwu	DE	Rice	

=== 2012 ===
Round	Pick	Player	Position	College	Notes
1	26	Whitney Mercilus	LB	Illinois	
3	68	DeVier Posey	WR	Ohio State	from Tampa Bay
3	76	Brandon Brooks*	OG	Miami (OH)	from Philadelphia
4	99	Ben Jones*	C	Georgia	from Tampa Bay via Philadelphia
4	121	Keshawn Martin	WR	Michigan State	
4	126	Jared Crick	DE	Nebraska	from New England via Denver and Tampa Bay
5	161	Randy Bullock	PK	Texas A&M	
6	195	Nick Mondek	OT	Purdue	

=== 2013 ===
Round	Pick	Player	Position	College	Notes
1	27	DeAndre Hopkins	WR	Clemson	
2	57	D. J. Swearinger	S	South Carolina	
3	89	Brennan Williams	OT	North Carolina	
3	95	Sam Montgomery	DE	LSU	
4	124	Trevardo Williams	DE	Connecticut	
6	176	David Quessenberry	OT	San Jose State	from Tennessee via Minnesota, Arizona, and Oakland
6	195	Alan Bonner	WR	Jacksonville State	
6	198	Chris Jones	DT	Bowling Green	from Atlanta via St. Louis
6	201	Ryan Griffin	TE	Connecticut	

=== 2014 ===
Round	Pick	Player	Position	College	Notes
1	1	Jadeveon Clowney	DE	South Carolina	
2	33	Xavier Su'a-Filo	OG	UCLA	
3	65	C. J. Fiedorowicz	TE	Iowa	
3	83	Louis Nix III	DT	Notre Dame	from Pittsburgh via Cleveland and Philadelphia
4	135	Tom Savage	QB	Pittsburgh	
6	177	Jeoffrey Pagan	DE	Alabama	
6	181	Alfred Blue	RB	LSU	from Oakland
6	211	Jay Prosch	FB	Auburn	
7	216	Andre Hal	CB	Vanderbilt	
7	256	Lonnie Ballentine	S	Memphis	

=== 2015 ===
Round	Pick	Player	Position	College	Notes
1	16	Kevin Johnson	CB	Wake Forest	
2	43	Benardrick McKinney	ILB	Mississippi State	
3	70	Jaelen Strong	WR	Arizona State	
5	175	Keith Mumphery	WR	Michigan State	(Compensatory Selection)
6	211	Reshard Cliett	OLB	South Florida	(Compensatory Selection)
6	216	Christian Covington	NT	Rice	(Compensatory Selection)
7	235	Kenny Hilliard	RB	LSU	

=== 2016 ===
Round	Pick	Player	Position	College	Notes
1	21	Will Fuller V	WR	Notre Dame	(From Washington)
2	50	Nick Martin	C	Notre Dame	
3	85	Braxton Miller	WR	Ohio State	(From Atlanta)
4	119	Tyler Ervin	RB	San Jose State	
5	159	K. J. Dillon	SS	West Virginia	
5	166	D. J. Reader	DT	Clemson	(From New England)

=== 2017 ===
Round	Pick	Player	Position	College	Notes
1	12	Deshaun Watson	QB	Clemson	(From Cleveland)
2	57	Zach Cunningham	LB	Vanderbilt	
3	89	D'Onta Foreman	RB	Texas	
4	130	Julién Davenport	OT	Bucknell	
4	142	Carlos Watkins	DT	Clemson	(From Cleveland)
5	169	Treston Decoud	CB	Oregon State	
7	243	Kyle Fuller	C	Baylor	

=== 2018 ===
Round	Pick	Player	Position	College	Notes
3	68	Justin Reid	S	Stanford	
3	80	Martinas Rankin	OT	Mississippi State	(From Seattle)
3	98	Jordan Akins	TE	Central Florida	
4	103	Keke Coutee	WR	Texas Tech	
6	177	Duke Ejiofor	DE	Wake Forest	
6	211	Jordan Thomas	TE	Mississippi State	
6	214	Peter Kalambayi	LB	Stanford	
7	222	Jermaine Kelly	CB	San Jose State	

=== 2019 ===
Round	Pick	Player	Position	College	Notes
1	23	Tytus Howard	OT	Alabama State	
2	54	Lonnie Johnson Jr.	CB	Kentucky	from Seattle
2	55	Max Scharping	OT	Northern Illinois	
3	86	Kahale Warring	TE	San Diego State	
5	161	Charles Omenihu	DE	Texas	
6	195	Xavier Crawford	CB	Central Michigan	
7	220	Cullen Gillaspia	FB	Texas A&M	from NY Giants via Denver

=== 2020 ===
Round	Pick	Player	Position	College	Notes
2	40	Ross Blacklock	Defensive tackle	TCU	from Arizona
3	90	Jonathan Greenard*	Defensive end	Florida	
4	126	Charlie Heck	Offensive tackle	North Carolina	from LA Rams
4	141	John Reid	Cornerback	Penn State	from Miami
5	171	Isaiah Coulter	Wide receiver	Rhode Island	

=== 2021 ===
Round	Pick	Player	Position	College	Notes
3	67	Davis Mills	Quarterback	Stanford	
3	89	Nico Collins	Wide receiver	Michigan	from Cleveland via Carolina
5	147	Brevin Jordan	Tight end	Miami	
5	170	Garret Wallow	Linebacker	TCU	from Cleveland via Jacksonville and LA Rams
6	195	Roy Lopez	Defensive tackle	Arizona	from Dallas via New England

=== 2022 ===
Round	Pick	Player	Position	College	Notes
1	3	Derek Stingley Jr.	Cornerback	LSU	
1	15	Kenyon Green	Guard	Texas A&M	from Miami via Philadelphia
2	37	Jalen Pitre	Safety	Baylor	
2	44	John Metchie III	Wide receiver	Alabama	from Cleveland
3	75	Christian Harris	Linebacker	Alabama	via Denver
4	107	Dameon Pierce	Running back	Florida	from Seattle via Cleveland
5	150	Thomas Booker	Defensive end	Stanford	from Chicago
5	170	Teagan Quitoriano	Tight end	Oregon State	from Tampa Bay via New England
6	205	Austin Deculus	Offensive tackle	LSU	from Green Bay

=== 2023 ===
Round	Pick	Player	Position	College	Notes
1	2	C. J. Stroud	Quarterback	Ohio State	
1	3	Will Anderson Jr.	Outside linebacker	Alabama	from Arizona
2	62	Juice Scruggs	Center	Penn State	
3	69	Tank Dell	Wide receiver	Houston	from Los Angeles Rams
4	109	Dylan Horton	Defensive end	TCU	from Las Vegas
5	167	Henry To'oTo'o	Linebacker	Alabama	from Los Angeles Rams
6	201	Jarrett Patterson	Center	Notre Dame	from Minnesota
6	202	Xavier Hutchinson	Wide receiver	Iowa State	from Buffalo
7	248	Brandon Hill	Safety	Pittsburgh	from Philadelphia

=== 2024 ===
Round	Pick	Player	Position	College	Notes
2	42	Kamari Lassiter	Cornerback	Georgia	from Minnesota
2	59	Blake Fisher	Offensive tackle	Notre Dame	
3	78	Calen Bullock	Safety	USC	from Seattle via Washington and Philadelphia
4	123	Cade Stover	Tight end	Ohio State	from Cleveland via Houston and Philadelphia
6	188	Jamal Hill	Linebacker	Oregon	from Las Vegas via New England and Minnesota
6	205	Jawhar Jordan	Running back	Louisville	from Detroit
7	238	Solomon Byrd	Defensive end	USC	from New Orleans
7	247	Marcus Harris	Defensive tackle	Auburn	
7	249	LaDarius Henderson	Guard	Michigan	from Detroit

=== 2025 ===
Round	Pick	Player	Position	College	Notes
2	34	Jayden Higgins	Wide receiver	Iowa State	from New York Giants
2	48	Aireontae Ersery	Offensive tackle	Minnesota	from Miami via Las Vegas
3	79	Jaylin Noel	Wide receiver	Iowa State	from Miami via Philadelphia and Washington
3	97	Jaylin Smith	Cornerback	USC	from Minnesota
4	116	Woody Marks	Running back	USC	from Miami
6	187	Jaylen Reed	Safety	Penn State	from San Francisco via Minnesota
6	197	Graham Mertz	Quarterback	Florida	from Denver
7	224	Kyonte Hamilton	Defensive tackle	Rutgers	from Chicago via Miami
7	255	Luke Lachey	Tight end	Iowa	from Cleveland

=== 2026 ===
Round	Pick	Player	Position	College	Notes
1	26	Keylan Rutledge	Offensive guard	Georgia Tech	from Buffalo
2	36	Kayden McDonald	Defensive tackle	Ohio State	from Las Vegas
2	59	Marlin Klein	Tight end	Michigan	
4	106	Febechi Nwaiwu	Offensive guard	Oklahoma	from Washington
4	123	Wade Woodaz	Linebacker	Clemson	from Los Angeles Chargers
5	141	Kamari Ramsey	Safety	USC	from Las Vegas via Cleveland
6	204	Lewis Bond	Wide Receiver	Boston College	from Los Angeles Chargers
7	243	Aiden Fisher	Linebacker	Indiana	from San Francisco
