= Michael Williams =

Michael Williams or Micheal Williams may refer to:

== Authors ==
- Michael Williams (author) (born 1952), known for his Dragonlance novels
- Michael Allen Williams, author of Rethinking "Gnosticism": An Argument for Dismantling a Dubious Category
- Michael G. Williams (born 1974), American author, podcaster, and speaker

== Fictional characters ==
- Michael Williams (Henry V), a character in William Shakespeare's Henry V
- Michael Williams (Neighbours), a character from the soap opera Neighbours

== Music ==
- Michael Williams, semifinalist on the twenty-first season of American Idol
- Michael Williams (guitarist), American blues guitarist
- Michael Williams II (born 1989), American record producer known professionally as Mike Will Made It
- Michael Glenn Williams (born 1957), composer, pianist and technologist
- Michael F. Williams (born 1962), New Zealand composer of contemporary classical music
- Michael James Williams (c. 1944–1983), known as Prince Far I, Jamaican reggae musician

== Politics ==
- Michael Williams (Georgia politician) (born 1973), Republican member of the Georgia State Senate
- Michael Williams (MP) (1785–1858), MP for West Cornwall and owner of Caerhays castle
- Michael Williams, Baron Williams of Baglan (1949–2017), British diplomat and United Nations special coordinator for Lebanon
- Michael J. Williams (politician) (born 1929), Trinidad and Tobago politician and businessman, acting president 1986–1987
- Michael John Williams (born 1979), congressional candidate for the 5th District of Connecticut
- Michael L. Williams (born 1953), Texas railroad commissioner; departing Texas education commissioner
- Micheal R. Williams (born 1955), American politician from Tennessee
- Sir Michael S. Williams (1911–1984), British diplomat

== Sports ==
=== American football ===
- Michael Williams (defensive back) (born 1970), American football player
- Michael Williams (defensive lineman) (born 1984), American football defensive end
- Michael Williams (running back) (born 1961), American football player
- Michael Williams (tight end) (born 1990), American football offensive lineman

=== Other sports ===
- H. Michael Williams (fl. 2010s), American athletic director
- Michael Williams (boxer) (born 1962), American boxer and actor
- Michael Williams (figure skater) (born 1947), British ice skater
- Michael Williams (footballer, born 2004), Canadian footballer
- Michael Williams (footballer) (born 1988), Montserattian footballer
- Michael Williams (runner, born 1989), American middle-distance runner and winner of the 2013 NCAA DI distance medley relay championship
- Michael Williams (runner, born 1971), Jamaican middle-distance runner and winner of the 1995 800 meters at the NCAA Division I Indoor Track and Field Championships
- Michael Williams (sprinter) (born 1964), Vincentian sprinter
- Micheal Williams (born 1966), American basketball player
- MJ Williams (Michael Jordan Williams, born 1995), Welsh footballer

== TV and film ==
- Michael Williams (actor) (1935–2001), British actor and husband of Judi Dench
- Michael Williams (Canadian TV personality), former MuchMusic VJ
- Michael Williams (film director) (born 1987), American film director
- Michael Williams (film producer) (born 1957), 2004 Academy Award winner for the documentary The Fog of War
- Michael C. Williams (actor) (born 1973), American actor
- Michael K. Williams (1966–2021), American actor best known for his role in The Wire

== Other people ==
- Michael Williams, defendant in United States v. Williams (2008)
- Michael Williams, academic in Indigenous Australian studies whose historical framework influenced Wesley Enoch's play The 7 Stages of Grieving
- Michael Williams (bishop), American Anglican bishop and retired U.S. Air Force chaplain
- Michael Williams (geographer) (1935–2009), Welsh historical geographer
- Michael Williams (philosopher) (born 1947), professor of philosophy at Johns Hopkins University
- Michael Williams (photographer) (1956–2024) Australian photographic artist
- Michael Ann Williams (born 1953), American folklorist
- Michael Duryea Williams (born 1957), American physicist
- Michael Ingouville Williams (born 1946), lord-lieutenant of East Lothian, Scotland
- Michael J. Williams (general) (born 1943), retired United States Marine Corps general
- Michael Paul Williams (born 1958), American journalist
- Michael R. Williams, president of the University of North Texas Health Science Center
- Murder of Michael Williams, a 1789 robbery and murder in England

== See also ==
- Michael Carter-Williams (born 1991), American basketball player
- Mike Williams (disambiguation)
- Mykel Williams (born 2004), American football player
