= Gus Young =

Gus Young may refer to:

- Gus Young (activist) (1909–1969), civil rights leader in Baton Rouge, Louisiana
- Gus Young (basketball) (1910–1977), American basketball coach
- Gus Young (footballer) (1915–1941), Australian rules footballer
- Gus Young (sprinter) (born 1961), Jamaican Olympic sprinter
