= Mike Williams =

Mike Williams or Mikey Williams may refer to:

== Sportspeople ==
=== American football ===
- Mike Williams (cornerback) (born 1953), American cornerback
- Mike Williams (American football coach) (born 1954), American football coach at Jacksonville State University
- Mike Williams (American football, born 1957) (1957–2013), American tight end and fullback who played for the Kansas City Chiefs
- Mike Williams (quarterback) (born 1958), American football quarterback
- Mike Williams (tight end) (born 1959), American tight end who played for the Washington Redskins
- Mike Williams (wide receiver, born 1966), American wide receiver who played for the Detroit Lions and Miami Dolphins
- Mike Williams (offensive lineman) (born 1980), American offensive lineman
- Mike Williams (wide receiver, born 1984), American wide receiver who played collegiately for USC
- Mike Williams (wide receiver, born 1987) (1987–2023), American wide receiver who played collegiately for Syracuse
- Mike Williams (wide receiver, born 1994), American wide receiver who played collegiately for Clemson

=== Association football ===
- Mike Williams (footballer, born 1956), Welsh football player for Wrexham and Bangor City
- Mike Williams (footballer, born 1965), Welsh football player for Chester City and Wrexham
- Mike Williams (footballer, born 1969), English football player
- Mike Williams (footballer, born 1986), Welsh football player for Wrexham and Altrincham

=== Basketball ===
- Mike Williams (basketball) (born 1963), American basketball player
- Mikey Williams (basketball, born 1991), Filipino-American basketball player
- Mikey Williams (basketball, born 2004), American basketball player

=== Other sports ===
- Mike Williams (baseball) (born 1968), American baseball player
- Mike Williams (boxer) (born 1962), American boxer
- Mike Williams (rugby union) (born 1991), Zimbabwean rugby player

== Musicians ==
- Mike Will Made It (born 1989), American hip-hop producer
- Mike IX Williams (born 1968), American lead singer for Eyehategod
- Mike Williams (trumpeter), American lead trumpet for the Count Basie Orchestra
- Mike Williams (DJ) (born 1996), Dutch electronic music producer
- Mike Williams, vocalist for The Agony Scene
- Mike Williams, former bassist for Project 86

== Others ==
- Mike Williams (1969–2000), American murder victim, see murder of Mike Williams
- Mike Williams (New Zealand politician) (born 1949), former president of the New Zealand Labour Party
- Mike Williams (journalist) (born 1979), British music journalist and current editor of NME
- Mike Williams (died 1871), deputy of "Wild Bill" Hickok who was accidentally shot and killed by Wild Bill
- Mike Williams, former president and CEO of Fannie Mae
- Mike Williams, lawyer and assistant to Daniel Fried
- Mike Williams, of Plastiq Musiq, American retailer of electronic pop music
- Mike Williams (physicist), American experimental particle physicist

== See also ==
- Michael Williams (disambiguation)
