= D. J. Williams =

D. J. Williams may refer to:

- D. J. Williams (linebacker) (born 1982), retired American football linebacker
- D. J. Williams (tight end) (born 1988), retired American football tight end
- D. J. Williams (running back) (born 1999), American football running back
- D. J. Williams (American football coach), American football quarterback and coach
- D. J. Williams (Welsh nationalist) (1885–1970), Welsh-language writer and political activist
- D. J. Williams (politician) (1897–1972), British miner and checkweighman who became a Labour Party Member of Parliament
- D. J. Williams (actor) (1868–1949), British actor

== See also ==
- List of people with surname Williams
