= Northeast High School (Louisiana) =

Location
- 13700 Pride-Port Hudson Road; Pride, Louisiana 70770; United States; 30.709282°N 91.023680°W

Information
- Established: 1981
- School district: East Baton Rouge Parish Public Schools
- CEEB code: 193060
- Principal: John Jenkins
- Teaching staff: 41.83 (as of 2023-2024)
- Grades: 7–12
- Enrollment: 365 (2023–2024)
- Student to teacher ratio: 8.73
- Campus type: Rural
- Colours: Royal Blue, Grey, White, Black
- Athletics: LHSAA Class 6-2A
- Mascot: Viking
- Website: ebrschools.org/northeasthigh/

Northeast High School is a public high school in Pride, unincorporated East Baton Rouge Parish, Louisiana, United States, north of Zachary and in the Baton Rouge metropolitan area, serving students in grades 7–12. It is a part of East Baton Rouge Parish Public Schools.

The school serves a section of the Brownfields census-designated place.

== History ==
Northeast High School was established in 1981 from the consolidation of Pride High School and Chaneyville High School.

At one time it served a section of Central before the city started its own school district.

== Athletics ==
Northeast High athletics competes in the LHSAA.

== Notable alumni ==
- Trindon Holliday, LSU running back and return specialist who broke the school record for men's 100 m dash with a time of 10.02
- Johnny Huggins, football player
- Doug Williams (Chaneyville), former NFL quarterback for the Washington Redskins and MVP of Super Bowl XXII
