= Jeff Grau =

American football player (born 1979)

No. 58, 47
- Positions: Long snapper, tight end

Personal information
- Born: December 16, 1979 (age 46); Inglewood, California, U.S.
- Listed height: 6 ft 3 in (1.91 m)
- Listed weight: 257 lb (117 kg)

Career information
- High school: Loyola (Los Angeles, California)
- College: UCLA (1998–2001)
- NFL draft: 2002: 7th round, 230th overall pick

Career history
- Washington Redskins (2002)*; Dallas Cowboys (2002); Tampa Bay Buccaneers (2003)*; Miami Dolphins (2003)
- * Offseason or practice squad member only

Career NFL statistics
- Games played: 27
- Stats at Pro Football Reference

Jeffrey Alan Grau (born December 16, 1979) is an American former professional football player who was a long snapper and tight end in the National Football League (NFL) for the Dallas Cowboys and Miami Dolphins. He played college football for the UCLA Bruins.

== Early life ==
Grau attended Loyola High School, where he didn't have a specific position in the football team. As a junior, he played quarterback and defensive tackle, while the next year, he played tight end and defensive end. As a senior, he posted 64 tackles, 6 sacks, 8 receptions for 68 yards. He helped his team become the CIF Division I runner-up and received All-League honors at defensive end.

In baseball, he played as a first baseman and pitcher, earning All-League honors three times and team MVP twice. As a sophomore, he tallied a .373 batting average. As a junior, he had an 8-1 record (1.52 ERA) and a .380 batting average. As a senior, he had a 4-0 record (1.23 ERA) and a .408 batting average.

== College career ==
Grau walked-on at the University of California, Los Angeles, becoming a four-year starter after earning the team's long snapper job during his freshman season. He was awarded a football scholarship prior to his junior season.

== Professional career ==
=== Washington Redskins ===
Grau was selected by the Washington Redskins in the seventh round (230th overall) of the 2002 NFL draft, to play as a long snapper. He was released on August 27.

=== Dallas Cowboys ===
In 2002, the Dallas Cowboys spent resources to sign free agent Jeff Robinson to upgrade the long snapper position, but he tore his Anterior cruciate ligament during training camp. Needing a replacement, the team claimed Grau off waivers on August 28. He played in all 16 games and posted 6 special teams tackles.

On August 6, 2003, he was traded to the Tampa Bay Buccaneers in exchange for a conditional draft choice (not exercised).

=== Tampa Bay Buccaneers ===
On August 24, 2003, he was released after the Tampa Bay Buccaneers decided to keep Ryan Benjamin as the starting long snapper.

=== Miami Dolphins ===
In 2003, after long snapper Ed Perry was lost for the season with a knee injury, the Miami Dolphins first tried to replace him with Sean McDermott, before signing Grau as a free agent on October 14. He was cut on March 2, 2004, after the team signed William Delahoussaye to compete with Perry.
