= Gus Young (footballer) =

Australian rules footballer

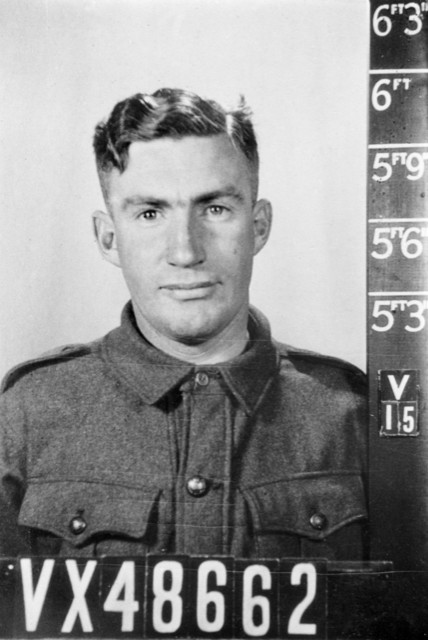
- The only known image of Gus Young, the paybook photo taken upon his enlistment.

Personal information
- Full name: Leo Young
- Born: 18 May 1915; Heyfield, Victoria
- Died: 29 May 1941 (aged 26); HMS Hereward, off Cape Sideros, Crete
- Original team: Maffra
- Height: 183 cm (6 ft 0 in)
- Weight: 78 kg (172 lb)
- Position: Forward

Playing career^{1}
Years	Club	Games (Goals)
1939–40	Hawthorn	10 (5)
- ^{1} Playing statistics correct to the end of 1940.

Leo "Gus" Young (18 May 1915 – 29 May 1941) was an Australian rules footballer who played with Hawthorn in the Victorian Football League. Rated as a top forward early in his career, Young was killed in action in World War II during the Battle of Crete.

== Family ==
The youngest of the seven children of Henry James Young (1870–1943), and Margaret Young (1875–1947), née Clark, Leo Young was born at Heyfield, Victoria on 18 May 1915.

== Education ==
He was educated (as a boarder) at the Marist Brothers' St Patrick's College, in Sale, Victoria.

== Football ==
=== Maffra (GFL) ===
Playing from, at least, 1933, he played for the Maffra Football Club in the Gippsland Football League, in four Grand Finals: two of which were won by Maffra (1935, and 1938).

=== Hawthorn (VFL) ===
He was cleared from Maffra to Hawthorn on 17 May 1939. The League records have him making his "debut" against North Melbourne, at the Arden Street Oval, on 15 July 1939; whilst technically correct—in that Young was selected as the team's 19th man—there is nothing in any of the available match reports to indicate that he ever took the field. His first match, as part of the Hawthorn "run on" team of 18 players, on the following Saturday (22 July 1939), against Geelong, at the Corio Oval.

Hawthorn have secured a promising player from Maffra in Leo (Gus) Young, who made a successful debut against Geelong. Stationed at half-forward [flank], he showed a sound knowledge of position play, and was noticeable for some quick-thinking actions which would have done credit to a more experienced player. Young, who is 23 years of age is a nicely built footballer weighing 12.9 [stone] and standing 5ft 11in. He played with Maffra for eight years, mostly as a utility player, and was a member of [two] premiership teams. – The Sporting Globe, 26 July 1939.
It has been said that the true test of a city player's ability can be gauged from the form he shows on the dreaded Geelong ground. If such is the case, Gus Young, the Maffra utility, has a bright future, as he was one of the outstanding players in his first League game with Hawthorn. He played on a half forward [flank], but as he has registered some good scoring performances when stationed at full forward for Maffra, it is likely that he will be given a trial in this position by Hawthorn. – The Herald, 28 July 1939.

He played in another three senior matches in 1939, and another five in 1940. His last match for Hawthorn was against Collingwood, at the Glenferrie Oval, on 6 July 1940 when, as 19th man, he took the field, in place of the injured Wally Culpitt, in the last quarter.

== Military service ==
A butcher by trade, Young enlisted in the Australian Imperial Force in August 1940, and became a bombardier in 3 Light Anti Aircraft Regiment RAA, Royal Australian Artillery. The unit was posted to Crete to protect RAF Heraklion from attack, and was involved in the German paratrooper attack that marked the beginning of the Battle of Crete.

== Death ==
During the battle of Crete (20 May 1941 – 1 June 1941), Young was a member of a Bofors gun crew. The Allies' problems with resupplying and communications quickly turned the battle in the Germans' favour.

On 29 May 1941, Young and his unit were evacuated from Crete on the destroyer HMS Hereward. The ship was bombed twice by Stuka bombers, with the second bombardment sinking the ship. Most aboard were rescued by MAS torpedo boats and the Italian destroyer Crispi, but Young was among the 48 Australians killed.

Originally declared missing in action, his status was later changed to "missing, believed killed", and, finally, to "drowned as a result of enemy action".

His body has never been recovered, and he is commemorated at the Athens Memorial, Athens, Greece and at the Australian War Memorial.

== See also ==
- List of Victorian Football League players who died on active service
