= D. J. Williams (American football coach) =

American football player and coach

Washington Commanders
- Title: Quarterbacks coach

Personal information
- Born: Zachary, Louisiana, U.S.
- Listed height: 6 ft 4 in (1.93 m)
- Listed weight: 195 lb (88 kg)

Career information
- Position: Quarterback (No. 4)
- High school: Tampa Catholic (Tampa, Florida)
- College: Grambling State (2011–2014)

Career history
- New Orleans Saints (2019–2023) Offensive assistant; Atlanta Falcons (2024–2025); Assistant quarterbacks coach (2024); Quarterbacks coach (2025); Washington Commanders (2026–present) Quarterbacks coach

Doug "D. J." Williams Jr. is an American professional football coach and former quarterback who is the quarterbacks coach for the Washington Commanders of the National Football League (NFL). Williams played college football for the Grambling State Tigers. He is the son of former NFL quarterback Doug Williams.

== Early life ==
Williams was born to Lataunya and former NFL quarterback Doug Williams, the latter of whom was a Super Bowl MVP in 1987. Williams first attended Tampa Catholic High School in Tampa, Florida, where he played football. He then transferred to Hargrave Military Academy in Chatham, Virginia before the 2010 season. Williams continued his football career for the Grambling State Tigers, where he emerged as the starting quarterback under his father, who was the head coach. In his first year at Grambling State, Williams led the team to winning the SWAC Football Championship Game over Alabama A&M in 2011. Williams began struggling as quarterback in 2013, causing him to temporarily lose his starting job with team struggles culminating in his father being fired. Williams college career was ended in October during the 2014 season after he required surgery on his ACL.

== Coaching career ==
Pre-draft measurables
Height	Weight	Arm length	Hand span	Wingspan
6 ft 3 1/4 in (1.91 m)	197 lb (89 kg)	34 1/8 in (0.87 m)	8 3/4 in (0.22 m)	6 ft 6 3/4 in (2.00 m)
All values from Pro Day

After going undrafted in the 2015 NFL draft, Williams participated in tryouts with the Pittsburgh Steelers and Baltimore Ravens but was unable to land a spot on either team's rosters. Williams began his coaching career assisting the New Orleans Saints during training camp in 2017 and working in the team's coaches and football operations department in 2018. In 2019, Williams became an offensive assistant for the Saints, a role he would hold until 2023. While with the Saints, Williams joined the coaching staff for the Senior Bowl. In 2024, Williams joined the Atlanta Falcons as an offensive analyst, specifically taking on a role as the assistant quarterbacks coach. Williams would be promoted the following year to quarterbacks coach. In 2026, Williams joined the Washington Commanders as their quarterbacks coach.
