= Doug Williams (quarterback) =

American football player, coach, and executive (born 1955)

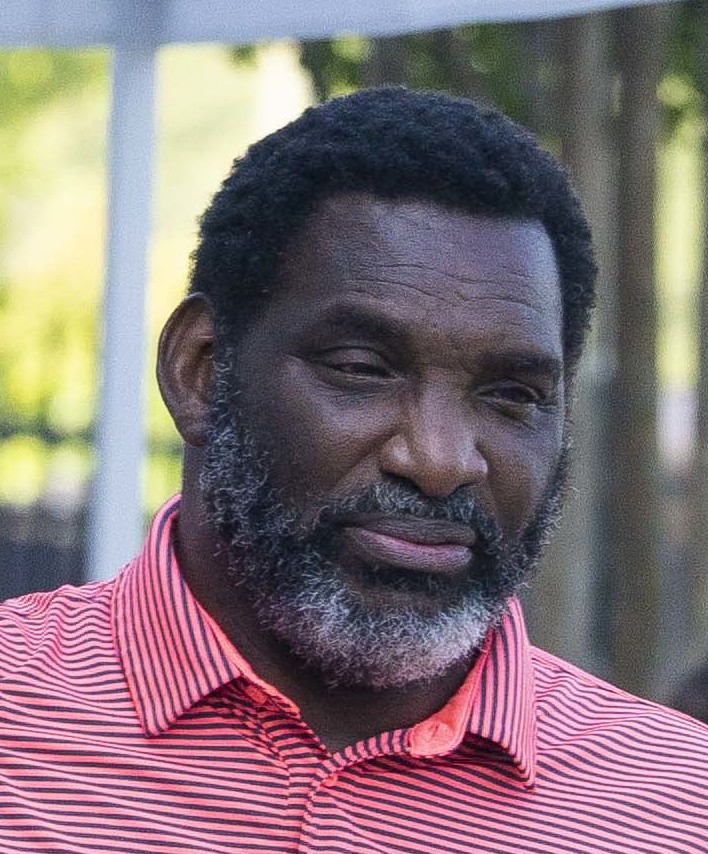
- Williams in 2021

Washington Commanders
- Title: Senior advisor to the general manager

Personal information
- Born: August 9, 1955 (age 71); Zachary, Louisiana, U.S.
- Listed height: 6 ft 4 in (1.93 m)
- Listed weight: 220 lb (100 kg)

Career information
- Position: Quarterback (No. 17, 12)
- High school: Chaneyville (Zachary)
- College: Grambling State (1974–1977)
- NFL draft: 1978: 1st round, 17th overall pick

Career history

Playing
- Tampa Bay Buccaneers (1978–1982); Oklahoma / Arizona Outlaws (1984–1985); Washington Redskins (1986–1989)

Coaching
- Pointe Coupee Central HS (1991) Head coach; Northeast HS (1993) Head coach; Navy Midshipmen (1994) Running backs coach; Scottish Claymores (1995) Offensive coordinator; Morehouse Maroon Tigers (1997) Head coach; Grambling State Tigers (1998–2003, 2011–2013) Head coach

Operations
- Jacksonville Jaguars (1995–1996) College scout; Tampa Bay Buccaneers (2004–2008) Personnel executive; Tampa Bay Buccaneers (2009–2010) Coordinator of pro scouting; Virginia Destroyers (2010–2011) General manager; Washington Redskins (2014–2016) Personnel executive; Washington Redskins (2017–2019) Senior vice president of player personnel; Washington Football Team (2020) Senior vice president of player development; Washington Football Team / Commanders (2021–present) Senior advisor

Awards and highlights
- Playing: Super Bowl champion (XXII); Super Bowl MVP (XXII); PFWA All-Rookie Team (1978); Washington Commanders 90 Greatest; Washington Commanders Ring of Fame; Tampa Stadium Krewe of Honor; Tampa Bay Buccaneers Ring of Honor; First-team All-American (1977); NCAA passing yards leader (1977); Coaching: 2× Black college national champion (2000, 2001); 4× SWAC champion (2000–2002, 2011); 3× SWAC Coach of the Year (2000–2002)

Career NFL statistics
- Passing attempts: 2,507
- Passing completions: 1,240
- Completion percentage: 49.5%
- TD–INT: 100–93
- Passing yards: 16,998
- Passer rating: 69.4
- Rushing yards: 884
- Rushing touchdowns: 15
- Stats at Pro Football Reference

Head coaching record
- Career: 64–42 (.604)
- College Football Hall of Fame

Douglas Lee Williams (born August 9, 1955) is an American professional football executive and former quarterback and coach who is a senior advisor for the Washington Commanders of the National Football League (NFL). Williams was the first black quarterback to both start and win a Super Bowl, doing so with Washington in Super Bowl XXII when they were known as the Redskins. He was named Super Bowl MVP after throwing four touchdowns in a single quarter.

Following his playing career, Williams began coaching, most notably serving as the head coach of the Grambling State Tigers. Following that, Williams has been a team executive for the Tampa Bay Buccaneers, Virginia Destroyers, and Washington Redskins. He was inducted into the College Football Hall of Fame in 2001.

== Early life ==
Williams was born on August 9, 1955, in Zachary, Louisiana, a town of about 8,000 people located near Baton Rouge. He played high school football at Chaneyville High School in Zachary.

== College career ==
Williams played quarterback for the Grambling State Tigers from 1974 to 1977. In his first two seasons, he played on the same team as future NFL receiver Sammy White. Williams guided the Tigers to a 36–7 (.837 winning percentage) record as a four-year starter, and led the Tigers to three Southwestern Athletic Conference Championships. Williams was named Black College Player of the Year twice.

In 1977, Williams led the NCAA in several categories, including total yards from scrimmage (3,249), passing yards (3,286), touchdown passes (38), and yards per play (8.6). Williams finished fourth in the Heisman Trophy voting, behind Earl Campbell, Terry Miller, and Ken MacAfee. Williams graduated from Grambling with a bachelor's degree in education, and began student teaching while working on his master's degree before the 1978 NFL draft.

Despite the success that he enjoyed on the field, Tampa Bay Buccaneers offensive coordinator Joe Gibbs was the only NFL coach who visited Williams to work him out and scout him. Gibbs spent two days with the 6 ft 4 in (1.93 m), 220 lb (100 kg) quarterback, reviewing play books, film, and going through passing drills. Impressed by his poise, work ethic, and studious nature, Gibbs rated Williams as the best quarterback in the draft, writing in his scouting report that Williams had "a big-time arm with perfect passing mechanics" and was "a natural leader...very academic and extremely prepared...football smart," and recommended that the Buccaneers select Williams with their first-round draft choice.

== Professional career ==
=== Tampa Bay Buccaneers ===
Following the recommendation of Gibbs, Tampa Bay drafted Williams in the first round (17th overall) of the 1978 NFL draft. Williams became the first African-American quarterback taken in the first round of an NFL draft. His first preseason pass, a 75-yard incompletion that sailed 10 yards past receiver Isaac Hagins, drew a standing ovation from the Tampa Stadium crowd. He was the first quarterback in Buccaneer history capable of throwing long passes downfield. In a 1979 game against the Chicago Bears, Williams and Bears quarterback Vince Evans made history by making it the first NFL game ever to have a black starting quarterback on both teams. Tampa Bay, which had won just two games in the first two years of the franchise, went to the playoffs three times in five seasons with Williams as starter and played in the 1979 NFC Championship game. During his time in Tampa Bay, Williams improved his completion percentage each season.

Williams was the only starting African-American quarterback in the NFL at that time, and dealt with racism from the fans, and even his own coaching staff. In his book Rise of the Black QB, author Jason Reid cited an incident in the 1978 Tampa Bay training camp, in which quarterbacks coach Bill Nelsen began berating Williams in what was described as going beyond coaching and becoming a personal attack. "I think Coach Gibbs knew that it wasn't a matter of being coached hard," recalled Williams. "I mean, I played for Eddie Robinson at Grambling, so he knew I could handle that. But he (Gibbs) immediately sensed that something else was going on." Gibbs, who was at the opposite end of the field, threw his clipboard, sprinted over to Nelsen and confronted him. Gibbs pointed his finger in Nelsen's face and said, "Don't you ever talk to him like that again! Is that clear?" According to Williams, Nelsen never confronted Williams in that manner again.

During his tenure with the Buccaneers, Williams was paid $120,000 a year, the lowest salary for a starting quarterback in the league and less than the salary of 12 backups. After the 1982 season, Williams asked for a $600,000 contract. Bucs owner Hugh Culverhouse refused to budge from his initial offer of $400,000 despite protests from coach John McKay. Feeling that Culverhouse was not paying him what an NFL starter should earn, Williams sat out the 1983 season. That year, the Bucs went 2–14, and did not make the playoffs again until the 1997 season 14 years later. Tampa Bay lost ten games in every season but one in that stretch, including 12 in a row from 1983 to 1994. Culverhouse's willingness to let Williams walk away over such a relatively small amount of money was seen as insensitive, especially as it came only months after Williams' wife Janice died of an aneurysm.

=== Oklahoma / Arizona Outlaws ===
After a year away from football, Williams signed with the Oklahoma Outlaws of the upstart United States Football League. The Outlaws briefly called Hall of Fame coach and quarterback guru Sid Gillman out of retirement as director of football operations, and Williams was Gillman's highest-profile signing. Williams signed a $3 million contract with a $1 million signing bonus, making him easily one of the highest-paid players in all of football. Years later, he recalled that he was won over when Outlaws owners William Tatham Sr. and Bill Tatham Jr. "treated me as a human," rather than "a piece of cattle in a stockyard."

In 1984, Williams led the Outlaws of the USFL in passing, completing 261 out of 528 passes for 3,084 yards and 15 touchdowns. However, he threw 21 interceptions, ending up with a passer rating of 60.5 during a 6–12 season. In 1985, the team moved to Arizona and merged with the Arizona Wranglers to become the Arizona Outlaws. Williams showed some improvement, completing 271 out of 509 passes for 3,673 yards with 21 touchdowns and 17 interceptions.

=== Washington Redskins ===
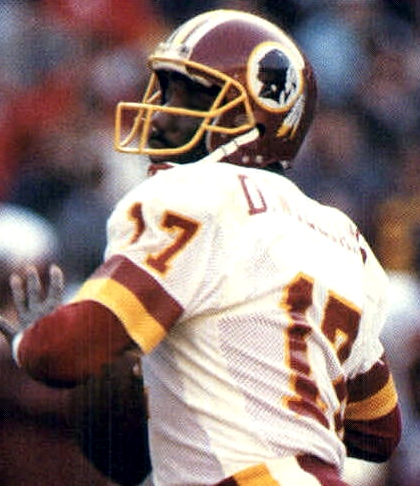
Williams with the Washington Redskins in 1987

After the USFL was shut down in 1986, Williams returned to the NFL, joining the Washington Redskins. He was reunited with his former offensive coordinator, Joe Gibbs, who was now the team's head coach. Initially, Williams served as the backup for starting quarterback Jay Schroeder, but after Schroeder got injured, Williams stepped in and led the Redskins to an opening-day victory against the Philadelphia Eagles in the 1987 season. Williams and Schroeder had a somewhat chilly relationship, stemming from Schroeder ordering Williams to get off the field when the Redskins thought Schroeder had been injured in the 1986 NFC title game and sent Williams in to substitute for him. It would be one of three times in 1987 that Williams substituted for Schroeder and led the team to victory (the other two were November 15 against Detroit and December 26 at Minnesota). Williams only started two games, September 20 at Atlanta and November 23 against the Rams. While both starts were losses, at the end of the season, when the Redskins had qualified for the playoffs, Williams, with his 94.0 passer rating, was chosen as the starter. He led the team to Super Bowl XXII in which they routed the Denver Broncos, becoming the first black quarterback to both play in and win a Super Bowl.

"I get this phone call from Coach Gibbs. He was the only guy who called me Douglas. 'Douglas, it's Coach Gibbs," he said. 'How you doing?" He asked me to come to Washington to be a backup. Now at this point, I don't have a job. I told him, 'Coach, I can be any type of 'up' you want me to be.' He started laughing. He said, 'OK. [Washington general manager] Bobby Beathard is going to give you a call.' Bobby called. We agreed [to terms]."

— Doug Williams

According to legend, Williams was asked this question on Media Day: "How long have you been a black quarterback?" He supposedly replied, "I've been a quarterback since high school, and I've been black all my life." On February 1, 2013, Williams was interviewed on the Boomer and Carton show, and he was asked by the host Craig Carton if the question ever happened. He replied that it was true. Williams said he thought the reporter was a little nervous and the question may have come out the wrong way and that no ill will was meant towards him.

On the day before Super Bowl XXII, Williams had a six-hour root canal surgery performed to repair a dental bridge abscess. On January 31, 1988, he engineered a 42–10 rout over the Broncos, who were led by quarterback John Elway. Williams completed 18 of 29 passes for 340 yards with four touchdown passes. All four touchdowns were thrown in the second quarter, which set a Super Bowl record for most touchdowns thrown in a single half, let alone a quarter. It was part of a 35-point second quarter that put the game out of reach. He was named Super Bowl MVP for his efforts, making him the first African-American quarterback to both win a Super Bowl and be named its MVP. He broke the Super Bowl single-game record of 331 passing yards set in 1985 by Joe Montana, who broke Williams' record the following year with 357. Williams tied the Super Bowl single-game record for passing touchdowns set by Terry Bradshaw in 1979, which Montana surpassed with five in Super Bowl XXIV. Williams' 80-yard scoring pass to Ricky Sanders tied the Super Bowl record for the longest pass, set by Jim Plunkett's throw to Kenny King in 1981; it was broken in 1997 by Brett Favre's 81-yard pass to Antonio Freeman for the longest Super Bowl play from scrimmage.

Entering the 1988 season, the Washington Post reported that Gibbs bluntly told Schroeder that Williams was his starter. While Schroeder was a Pro Bowl player two years earlier and the younger of the two, Gibbs sided with Williams, believing that Schroeder lacked the proper attitude to play. “I think Jay, right now, wants to be somewhere else and shouldn’t be playing quarterback for this team with his frame of mind,” Gibbs said. Gibbs also indicated at the time that if Schroeder was still a member of the team when the season began and Williams was injured, Schroeder would not be considered as a replacement under any circumstances, meaning that Mark Rypien was elevated to Williams’ backup, followed by Stan Humphries.

As it turned out, Williams suffered from injuries early on, and was replaced by Rypien, who eventually won the starting job. Despite competing for the same starting job, the dynamics were completely different from the Williams/Schroeder quarterback controversy, as there was no animosity between the two. Williams praised Rypien's work ethic and ability to process information he shared, while Rypien has cited Williams as a mentor to him both on and off the field. The two were so supportive of each other that T-shirts were sold with the caption "United We Stand", depicting the two quarterbacks as cartoon characters with Williams saying "I'm for Mark" and Rypien saying "I'm for Doug". Williams would play one final season in 1989, as Rypien's backup, during the latter's first Pro Bowl season.

Finances played a large part in Williams' departure from the Redskins, with Williams slated to make $1 million in 1990 as the team's backup quarterback. The Redskins were able to sign former New York Giants quarterback Jeff Rutledge for the backup role for substantially less money, making Williams expendable. Williams received scant attention from other teams following his waiver by the Redskins – a situation which he flatly attributed to racism. Williams retired with a 5–9 record as Redskins starter (8–9, counting playoffs) and a 38–42–1 record as a regular season starter (42–45–1, including 7 playoff starts). He had 100 passing touchdowns and 15 rushing touchdowns in 88 NFL games.

== Career statistics ==
=== USFL ===
Year	Team	Games		Passing								Rushing			
Year	Team	GP	GS	Cmp	Att	Pct	Yds	Avg	TD	Int	Rtg	Att	Yds	Avg	TD
1984	Oklahoma Outlaws	15	15	261	528	49.4	3,084	5.8	15	21	60.5	30	75	2.5	3
1985	Arizona Outlaws	17	17	271	509	53.2	3,673	7.2	21	17	76.4	27	82	3.0	1
Career		32	32	532	1,037	51.3	6,757	6.5	36	38	68.3	57	157	2.8	4

=== NFL ===
Legend
	Super Bowl MVP
	Won the Super Bowl
**Bold**	Career high

Year	Team	Games			Passing								Rushing			
Year	Team	GP	GS	Record	Cmp	Att	Pct	Yds	Avg	TD	Int	Rtg	Att	Yds	Avg	TD
1978	TB	10	10	4–6	73	194	37.6	1,170	6.0	7	8	53.4	27	23	0.9	1
1979	TB	16	16	**10–6**	166	397	41.8	2,448	6.2	18	**24**	52.5	35	119	3.4	2
1980	TB	16	16	5–10–1	**254**	**521**	48.8	3,396	6.5	**20**	16	69.9	**58**	**370**	**6.4**	**4**
1981	TB	16	16	9–7	238	471	50.5	**3,563**	7.6	19	14	76.8	48	209	4.4	**4**
1982	TB	9	9	5–4	164	307	53.4	2,071	6.7	9	11	69.6	35	158	4.5	2
1986	WAS	1	0	–	0	1	0.0	0	0.0	0	0	39.6	0	0	0	0
1987	WAS	5	2	0–2	81	143	**56.6**	1,156	**8.1**	11	5	**94.0**	7	9	1.3	1
1988	WAS	11	10	4–6	213	380	56.1	2,609	6.9	15	12	77.4	9	0	0.0	1
1989	WAS	4	2	1–1	51	93	54.8	585	6.3	1	3	64.1	1	-4	-4.0	0
Career		88	81	38–42–1	1,240	2,507	49.5	16,998	6.8	100	93	69.4	220	884	4.0	15

== Coaching and executive career ==
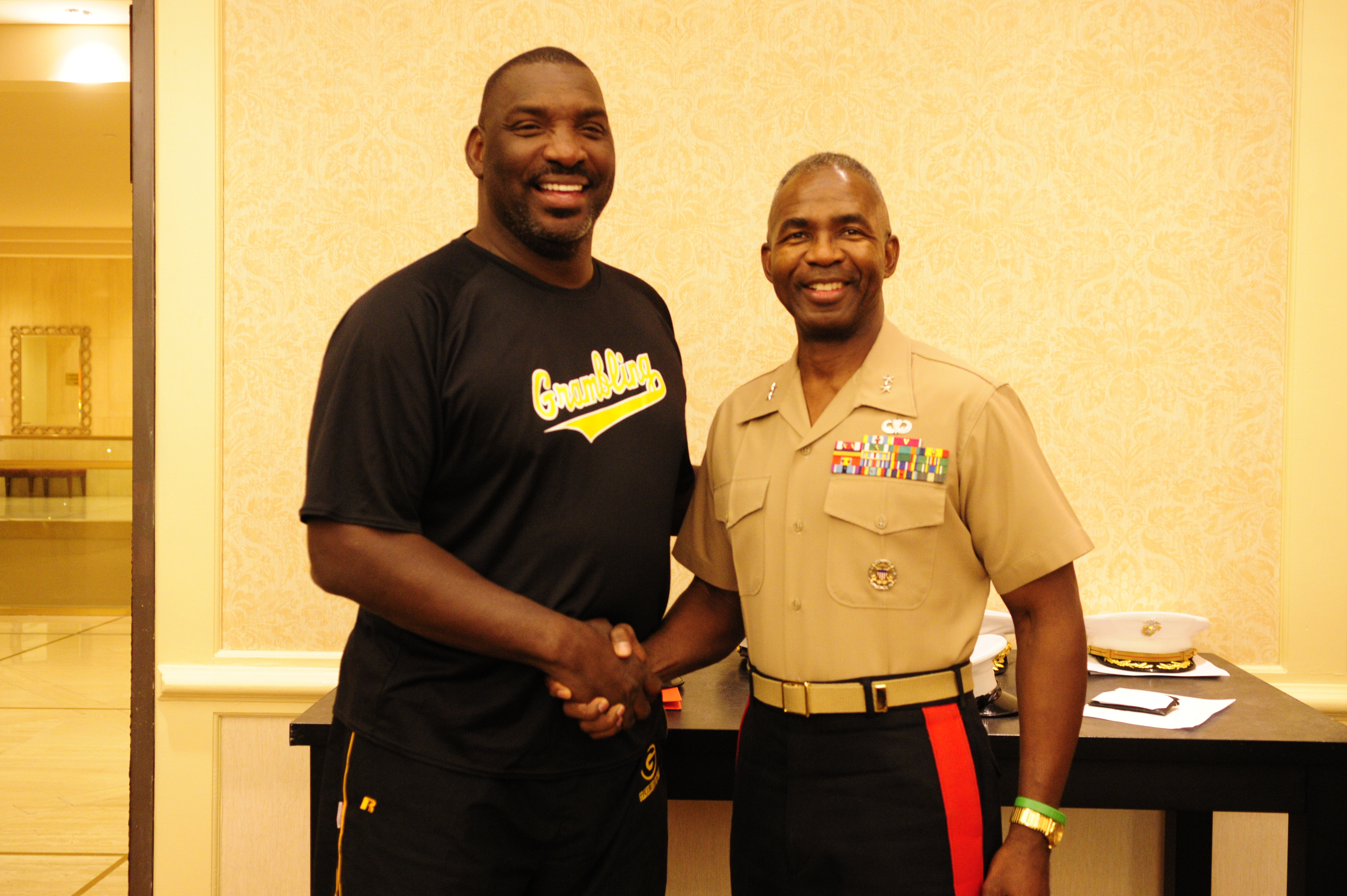
Williams (left) as head coach of Grambling State posing with Marine general Ronald L. Bailey (right) in 2011

Following his departure from the NFL, Williams worked on television in 1990 as a college football analyst for Black Entertainment Television (BET). Despite enjoying the change of pace, Williams longed to return to football and when a high school head coaching position opened up in 1991 at the new Pointe Coupee Central High School in the unincorporated Labarre area of Pointe Coupee Parish, Louisiana, Williams applied for the job and was hired for the position. Williams led the 35-player team to a 5–5 record in the season, including an upset of the second-ranked school in the state.

In 1992, Williams was able to move on to coach at his former high school in Zachary, now renamed Northeast High. Playing its home games on a field bearing his name, Williams was able to lead the team to an undefeated regular season, finally falling in the state semi-finals. During the 1993 Louisiana HS playoffs, his team notably knocked out Isidore Newman High School, then led by senior quarterback Peyton Manning.

Williams moved to the collegiate coaching ranks in 1994, when he was hired as the running backs coach for the football team of the United States Naval Academy in Annapolis, Maryland. He worked as offensive coordinator for the Scottish Claymores of the World League of American Football early in 1995 and as a scout for the NFL's Jacksonville Jaguars during the 1995 NFL season.

Williams began his collegiate head coaching career at Morehouse College in 1997. He was named the head football coach at Grambling State University in 1998, succeeding the legendary Eddie Robinson. He led the Tigers to three consecutive Southwestern Athletic Conference titles from 2000 to 2002, before leaving to rejoin the Tampa Bay Buccaneers as a personnel executive.

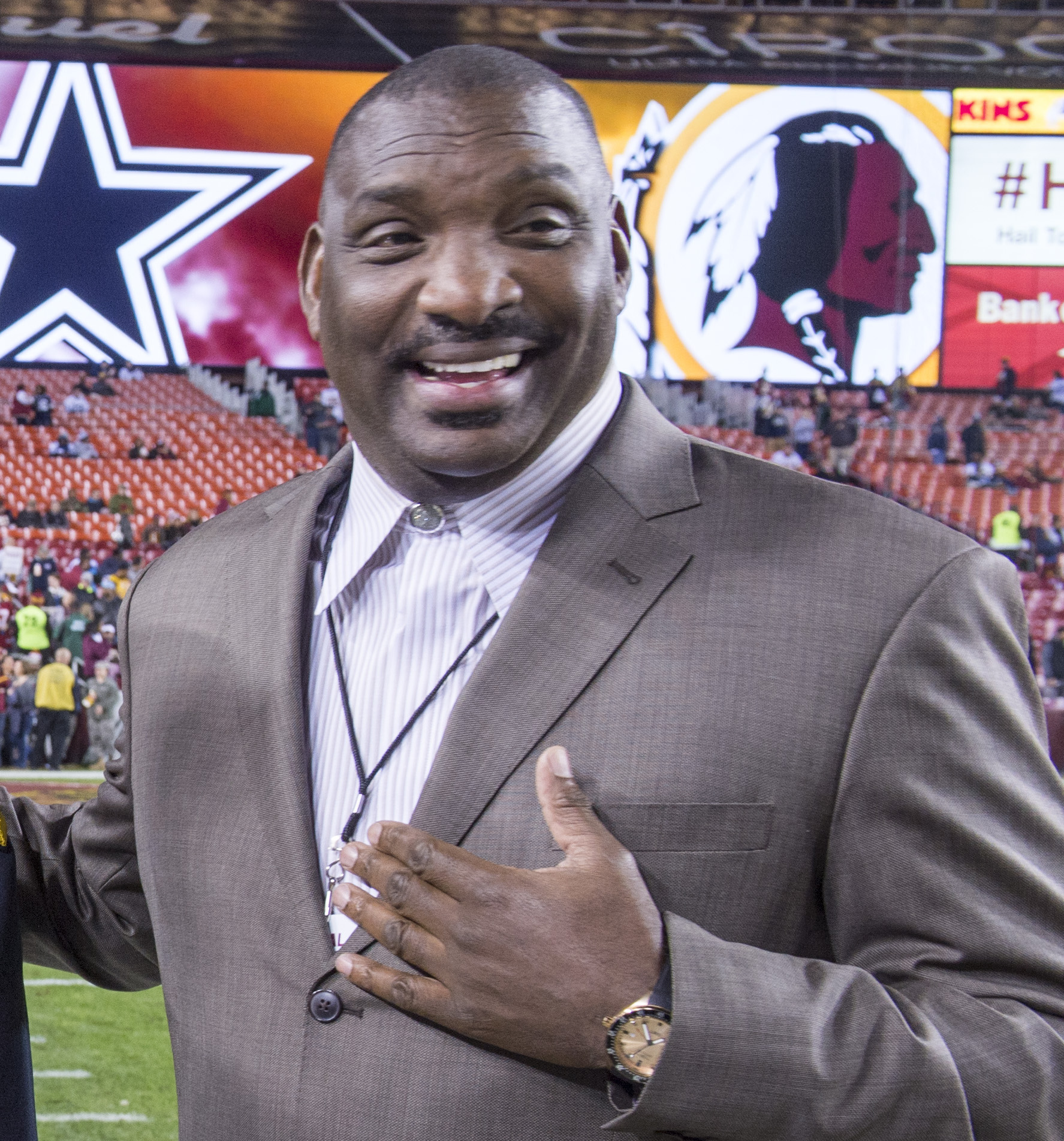
Williams in 2015

At the conclusion of Super Bowl XLII, on the 20th anniversary of being named Super Bowl XXII MVP, Williams carried the Vince Lombardi trophy on to the field for presentation to the winning New York Giants. Williams was named the director of professional scouting for the Tampa Bay Buccaneers in February 2009. He was relieved of this position on May 11, 2010.

Williams was subsequently hired as general manager of the Norfolk expansion franchise in the United Football League, now known as the Virginia Destroyers. On February 21, 2011, Williams resigned from the Destroyers to begin his second stint as the head football coach at Grambling State University. He was fired from this position on September 11, 2013.

In February 2014, Williams rejoined the Redskins as a personnel executive. The hiring marked Williams' return to the Redskins. Williams was promoted to the position of Senior Vice President of Player Personnel in June 2017. In 2020, following a front office restructure after the hiring of Ron Rivera as head coach, Williams was named the team's senior vice president of player development. The following year he became a senior advisor to team president Jason Wright.

=== Head coaching record ===
==== College ====
Year	Team	Overall	Conference	Standing	Bowl/playoffs	TSN^{#}
Morehouse Maroon Tigers (Southern Intercollegiate Athletic Conference) (1997)
1997	Morehouse	3–8	0–6	10th		
Morehouse:		3–8	0–6			
Grambling State Tigers (Southwestern Athletic Conference) (1998–2003)
1998	Grambling State	5–6	4–4	T–4th		
1999	Grambling State	7–4	2–2	3rd (West)		
2000	Grambling State	10–2	6–1	1st (West)		13
2001	Grambling State	10–1	6–1	1st (West)		8
2002	Grambling State	11–2	6–1	1st (West)		8
2003	Grambling State	9–3	6–1	T–1st (West)		17
Grambling State Tigers (Southwestern Athletic Conference) (2011–2013)
2011	Grambling State	8–4	6–3	1st (West)		
2012	Grambling State	1–10	0–9	5th (West)		
2013	Grambling State	0–2*	0–1*			
Grambling State:		61–34	36–23			
Total:		64–42				
National championship Conference title Conference division title or championship game berth

^{*} Williams was fired on September 11, 2013.

== Personal life and legacy ==
Williams' brother, Mike Williams, was also a quarterback at Grambling State and in the Canadian Football League. Doug's first wife, Janice (Goss), died of a brain tumor in 1983 at age 26. They had one child together, Ashley Monique. His second wife was Lisa Robinson, whom he married in 1987. They had one son together, Adrian. Williams married his third wife, Raunda in 2005. Together, they had 6 children: Jasmine, D. J., Lee, Temessia, Laura and Carmaleta. His sons Adrian and D.J. are both accomplished former collegiate athletes. Adrian played basketball for Brown University until graduating after the 2010–11 season, while D.J. played football for his father at Grambling State University, went on to coach in the NFL, and as of January 2026 was named the quarterbacks coach for the Washington Commanders. His daughter Laura has committed to playing basketball at University of Southern California for the 2024–2025 season. Doug's nephew Johnny Huggins also played in the NFL.

In 2009, Williams and fellow Grambling State alumnus James Harris co-founded the Black College Football Hall of Fame. Each year, several notable football players from historically black colleges and universities are entered in its hall of fame at an induction ceremony in Atlanta. In July 2019, Grambling State honored Williams by naming a street in his honor on the college's campus. Williams was inducted into the College Football Hall of Fame in 2001, the Black College Football Hall of Fame in 2011, the Louisiana Sports Hall of Fame in 1993, and the Washington DC Sports Hall of Fame.

== See also ==
- List of NCAA major college football yearly passing leaders
- List of NCAA major college football yearly total offense leaders
- Racial issues faced by black quarterbacks
