= Trindon Holliday =

American football player (born 1986)

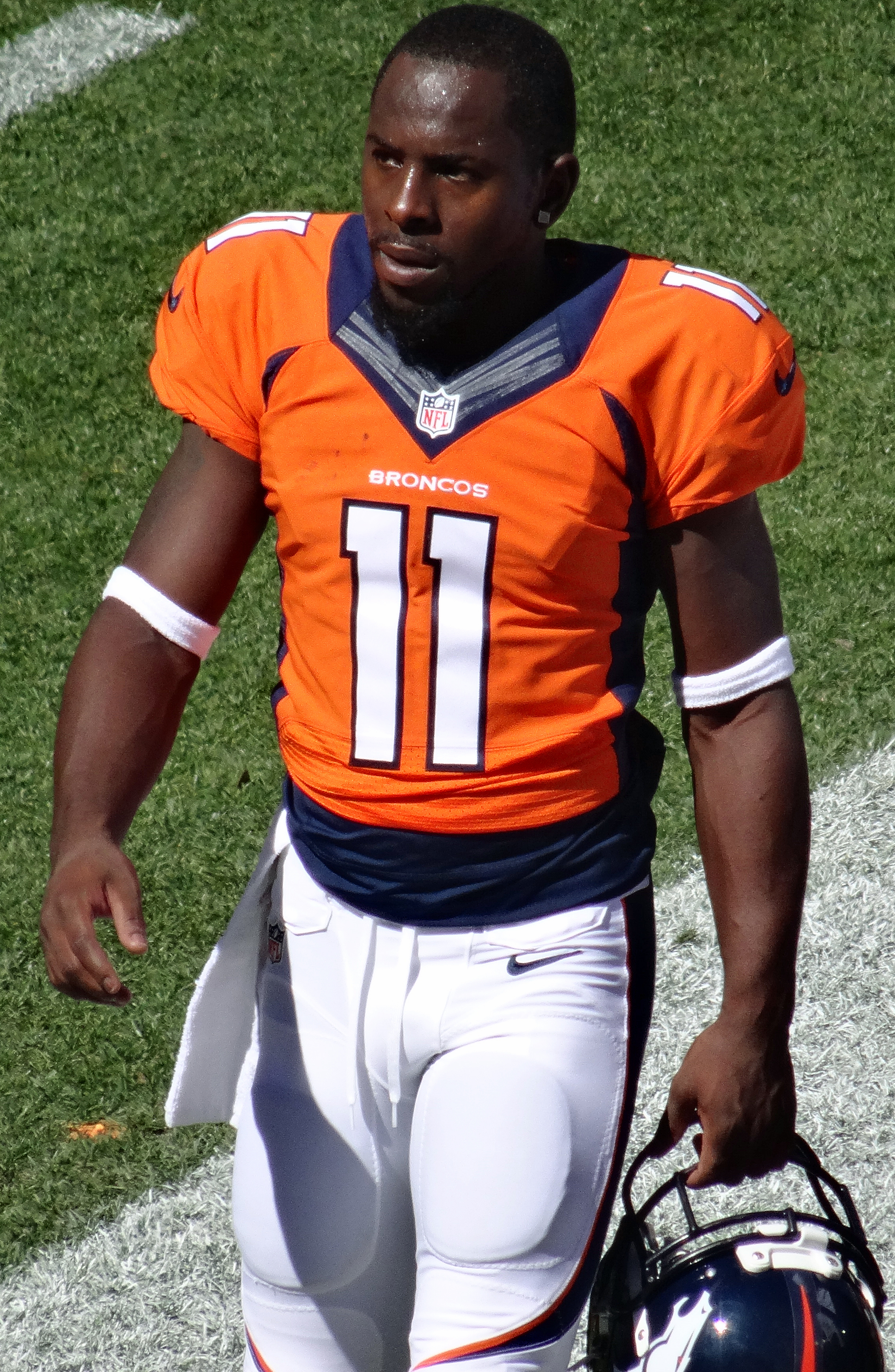
- Holliday with the Denver Broncos in 2013

No. 16, 11, 19
- Positions: Wide receiver, return specialist

Personal information
- Born: April 27, 1986 (age 40); Zachary, Louisiana, U.S.
- Listed height: 5 ft 5 in (1.65 m)
- Listed weight: 166 lb (75 kg)

Career information
- High school: Northeast (Pride, Louisiana)
- College: LSU (2006–2009)
- NFL draft: 2010: 6th round, 197th overall pick

Career history
- Houston Texans (2010−2012); Denver Broncos (2012−2013); New York Giants (2014); Tampa Bay Buccaneers (2014); San Francisco 49ers (2014); Oakland Raiders (2015)*
- * Offseason or practice squad member only

Awards and highlights
- NFL punt return yards leader (2012); BCS national champion (2007)

Career NFL statistics
- Receptions: 2
- Receiving yards: 17
- Return yards: 2,224
- Total touchdowns: 4
- Stats at Pro Football Reference

Trindon Jerard Holliday (born April 27, 1986) is an American former professional football player who was a wide receiver and return specialist in the National Football League (NFL). He played college football for the LSU Tigers and was selected by the Houston Texans in the sixth round of the 2010 NFL draft. At 5'5", Holliday is one of the shortest players in NFL history. He was also a member of the Denver Broncos, New York Giants, Tampa Bay Buccaneers, San Francisco 49ers, and Oakland Raiders.

== Early life ==
Holliday went both ways at Northeast High School, in Pride, Louisiana. Because of his short stature, Holliday did not start on the football team until his junior year. In his first season starting, he rushed for 1,870 yards and scored 26 touchdowns. In his senior year, Holliday put up even better statistics by rushing for 2,210 yards, scoring 34 touchdowns, and averaging 27.6 yards per punt return.

Holliday was also a track runner in high school. In 2005, Holliday posted the nation's fastest indoor time in the 55 and 60-meter dashes. He led his team into the 2A state title by winning the 100 meters and 200 meters and was second in the long jump. Holliday was a four-time state champion in the 200 meters and a three-time 100 meters champion.

== College career ==
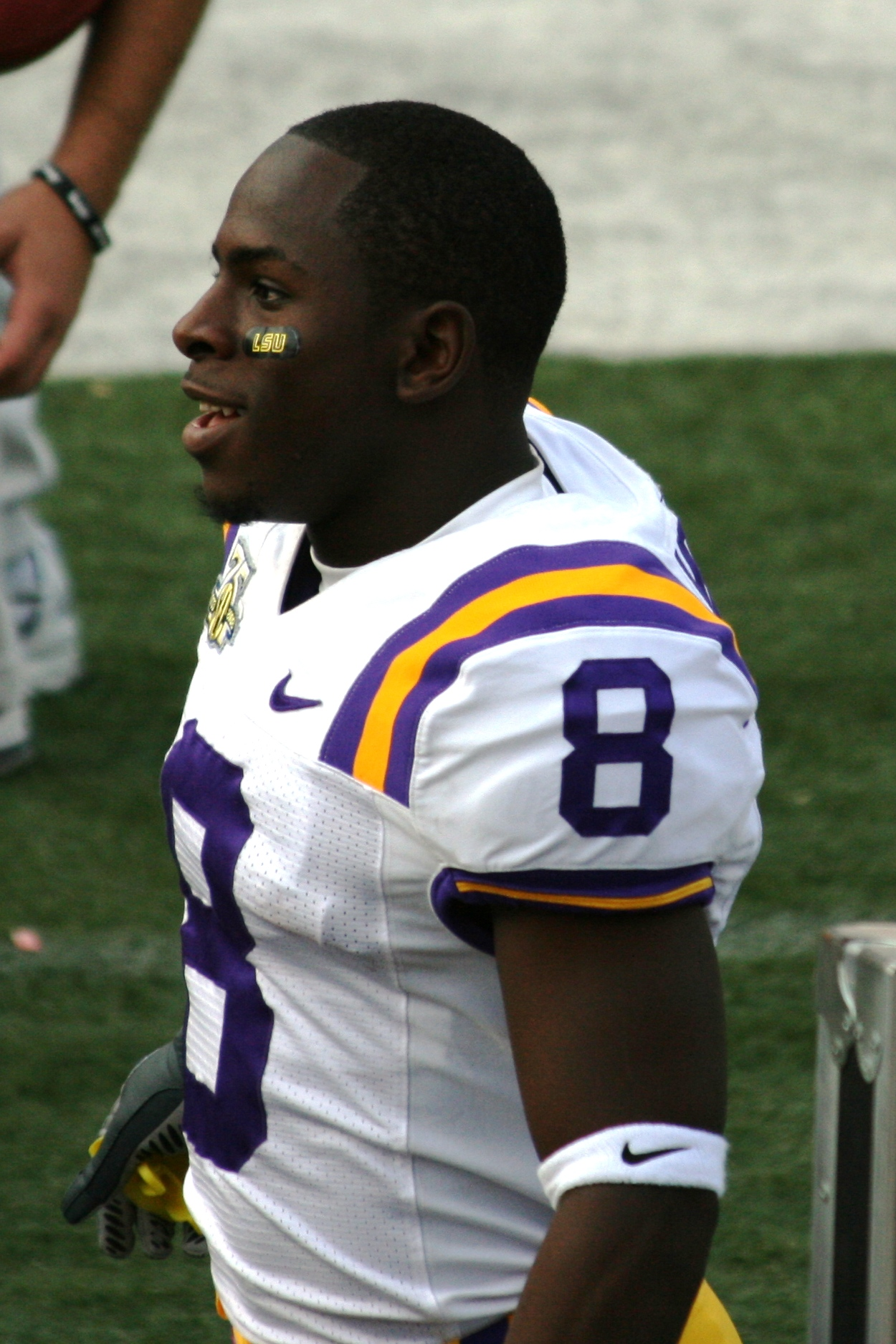
Holliday playing football for the LSU Tigers

=== Football ===
Holliday played football for the LSU Tigers football team from 2006 to 2009. In that time, he recorded eight touchdowns: four rushing, two on punt returns and two on kick returns.

=== Track and field ===
Holliday was a top-ranked American sprinter competing for the LSU Tigers track and field team and is regarded as one of the fastest players in football. He demonstrated his sprinting ability in the 100-meter dash at the 2007 USA Outdoor Track and Field Championships, where he recorded 10.07 seconds in the final – ahead of Walter Dix and second only to Tyson Gay. This qualified him for the 2007 World Championships in Athletics but he opted to not compete, preferring to begin the football season with the LSU Tigers. He continued to race, however, and reached the semi-finals in the 100 m at the 2008 United States Olympic Trials the following year.

In his first year at LSU in 2007, he broke Xavier Carter's school record and became the Southeastern Conference 100 m champion. At the NCAA Outdoor Track and Field Championship later that year he set a personal record in the semifinals and finished runner-up in the final to Walter Dix. The following year, he took third in the 100 m NCAA final and anchored the 4×100-meter relay team to victory in 38.42 seconds – the fastest collegiate time that year.

Track and Field News has Holliday recorded at 6.19 over 55 meters indoors in 2005, leading the nation.

Personal records

Event	Time (seconds)	Venue	Date
55 meters	5.8	Gainesville, Florida	February 24, 2006
60 meters	6.54	Fayetteville, Arkansas	March 15, 2008
100 meters	10.00	Fayetteville, Arkansas	June 10, 2009
200 meters	20.58	Fayetteville, Arkansas	February 14, 2009

At some point after leaving the NFL in 2015, Holliday returned to LSU to complete his college degree. He graduated in the summer semester of 2023 with a bachelor's degree.

== Professional career ==
=== Pre-draft ===
Pre-draft measurables
Height	Weight	Arm length	Hand span	40-yard dash	10-yard split	20-yard split	20-yard shuttle	Three-cone drill	Vertical jump	Broad jump	Bench press
5 ft 5 1/4 in (1.66 m)	166 lb (75 kg)	28 1/2 in (0.72 m)	8 1/4 in (0.21 m)	4.34 s	1.52 s	2.58 s	4.48 s	6.54 s	42.0 in (1.07 m)	9 ft 8 in (2.95 m)	10 reps
All values from NFL Combine

Leading up to the 2010 NFL Scouting Combine, Holliday had hoped to break Chris Johnson's record mark of 4.24 in the 40-yard dash. Holliday had self-reported running times as fast as 4.21, which seemed plausible given his extensive track background, and the fastest 100 m dash time of any football player in NCAA history. At the combine, reports of Holliday's 40-yard dash time ranged from between 4.18 seconds and 4.34 seconds. Adam Schefter, an ESPN reporter on hand at the event, had reported on Twitter that NFL scouts had clocked Holliday in as low as 4.21 during the workout. However, the NFL Network broadcast team record Holliday's two tries at unofficial times of 4.27 and 4.32, respectively, and ultimately published it as 4.34 seconds officially.

=== Houston Texans ===
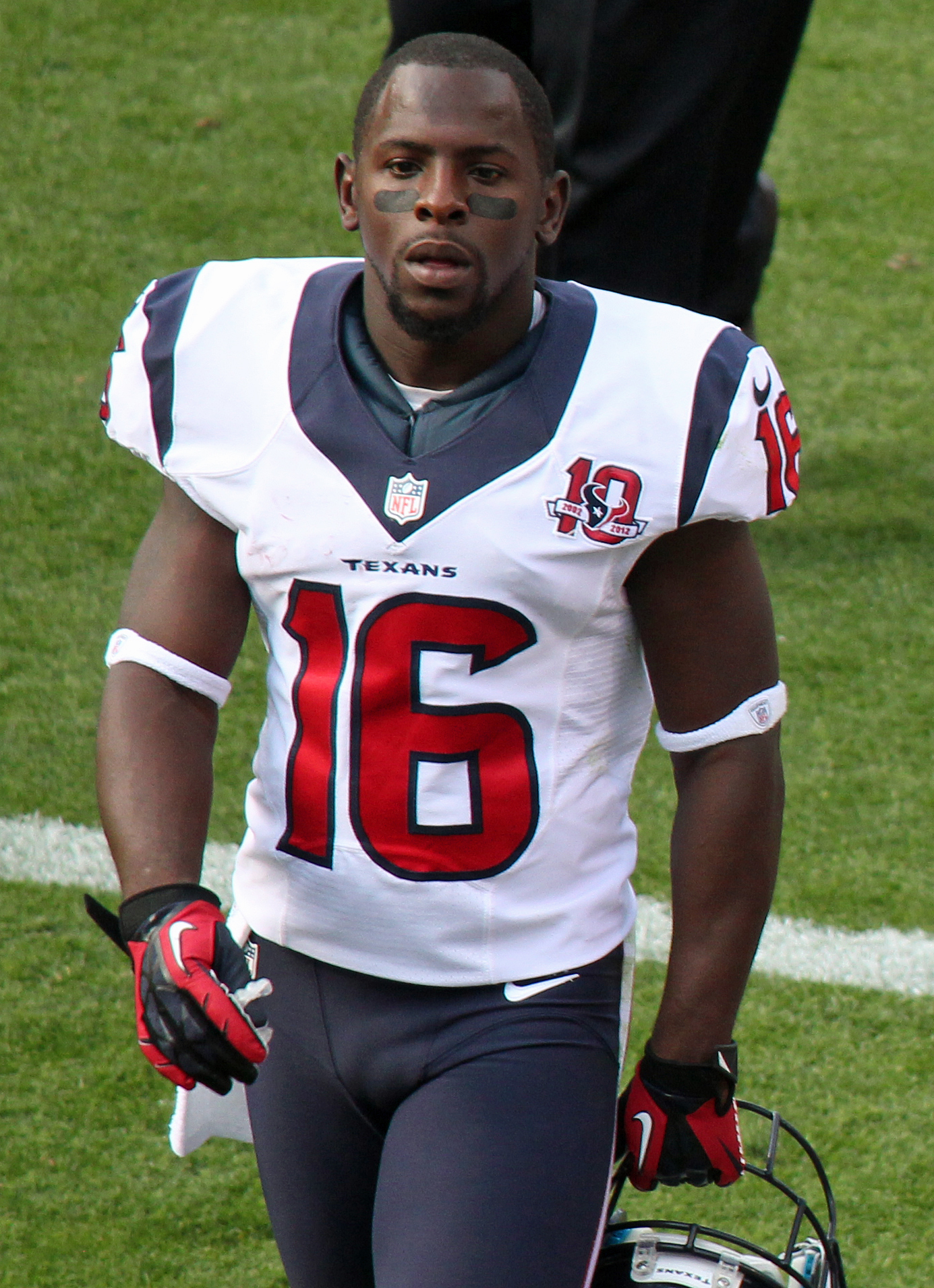
Holliday with the Texans in 2010

Holliday was selected by the Houston Texans in the sixth round of the 2010 NFL draft. Despite his speed, Holliday struggled on kickoff returns in the preseason. He was placed on injured reserve because of a fracture in his thumb. On September 3, 2011, he was cut and then placed on the practice squad. On October 5, Holliday's practice squad contract was terminated and he was later added to the active roster, but was waived on October 25. He was later re-signed and in Week 1 of the 2012 preseason against the Carolina Panthers, he returned a kickoff return for a touchdown. The next week against the San Francisco 49ers, Holliday returned a punt for a touchdown. In the final preseason game against the Minnesota Vikings, Holliday recorded his third touchdown in four games; this touchdown was a 76-yard punt return. Following the preseason, Holliday made the Texans' 53-man roster and was named as the starting punt and kick returner. Holliday was waived by the Texans on October 10, 2012, in a move to bolster an injury-depleted defense. Part of the reason Holliday was released was due to his fumbling problems. He had fumbled the ball six times in 2012, however losing only one of them.

=== Denver Broncos ===
On October 11, 2012, Holliday was claimed off of waivers by the Denver Broncos. On October 15, in his first game as a Bronco against the San Diego Chargers, Holliday fumbled and lost the ball on a punt return in the first quarter of the game. He returned a kickoff 105 yards for a touchdown against the Cincinnati Bengals on November 4, breaking the Broncos record for the longest play. On November 11, he returned a Carolina Panthers punt for 76 yards. The play was ruled a touchdown despite his fumbling of the ball on the one-yard line. In 2012, Holliday's teams went undefeated during the regular season. He started the season with the Texans who were 5-0 when they cut him. He was then acquired by the Broncos who finished the regular season 13–3 with an 11-game win streak.

On January 12, 2013, Holliday returned a punt in the first quarter of the game against the Baltimore Ravens for a 90-yard touchdown, the longest punt return in postseason history. On the opening kickoff of the second half, he returned it for a 104-yard touchdown. Holliday became the first player in NFL history with a punt return touchdown and a kick return touchdown in the same postseason game. He had 256 total punt and kick return yards but the Broncos lost, 38-35 in double overtime.

In the 2013 season, Holliday returned a punt 81 yards for a touchdown in 41–23 Week 2 victory at the New York Giants. He also returned a kick-off 105 yards for a touchdown in Week 4 52–20 win over the Philadelphia Eagles.

As of 2017's NFL off-season, Holliday held at least 11 Broncos franchise records, including:

- Kick Ret Yds: playoff game (158 on 2013-01-12 BAL)
- Yds/KR: career (29.05), playoffs (28.67), playoff game (52.67 on 2013-01-12 BAL)
- Kick Ret TDs: career (2; with Goldie Sellers), playoff career/season/game (1 on 2013-01-12 BAL)
- Punt Returns: game (8 on 2012-11-11 @CAR; with Rick Upchurch)
- Punt Ret Yds: playoff game (90 on 2013-01-12 BAL)
- Yds/PR: playoff game (30 on 2013-01-12 BAL)
- Punt Ret TDs: playoff career/season/game (1 on 2013-01-12 BAL)
- Total Return Yds: playoff game (248 on 2013-01-12 BAL)
- Total Return TDs: career (4), playoff career/season/game (2 on 2013-01-12 BAL, also NFL record)

=== New York Giants ===
On March 17, 2014, Holliday signed a one-year contract with the New York Giants. He was released by the Giants on October 6.

=== Tampa Bay Buccaneers ===
Holliday signed with the Tampa Bay Buccaneers on October 21, 2014. He was waived/injured by Tampa Bay on October 31.

=== San Francisco 49ers ===
On December 26, 2014, the San Francisco 49ers signed Holliday. He was released by San Francisco on April 30, 2015.

=== Oakland Raiders ===
On June 3, 2015, the Oakland Raiders signed Holliday, with the expectation of competing with T. J. Carrie for the team's No. 1 returner role. On September 1, he was released by the Raiders.

== Issues with size ==
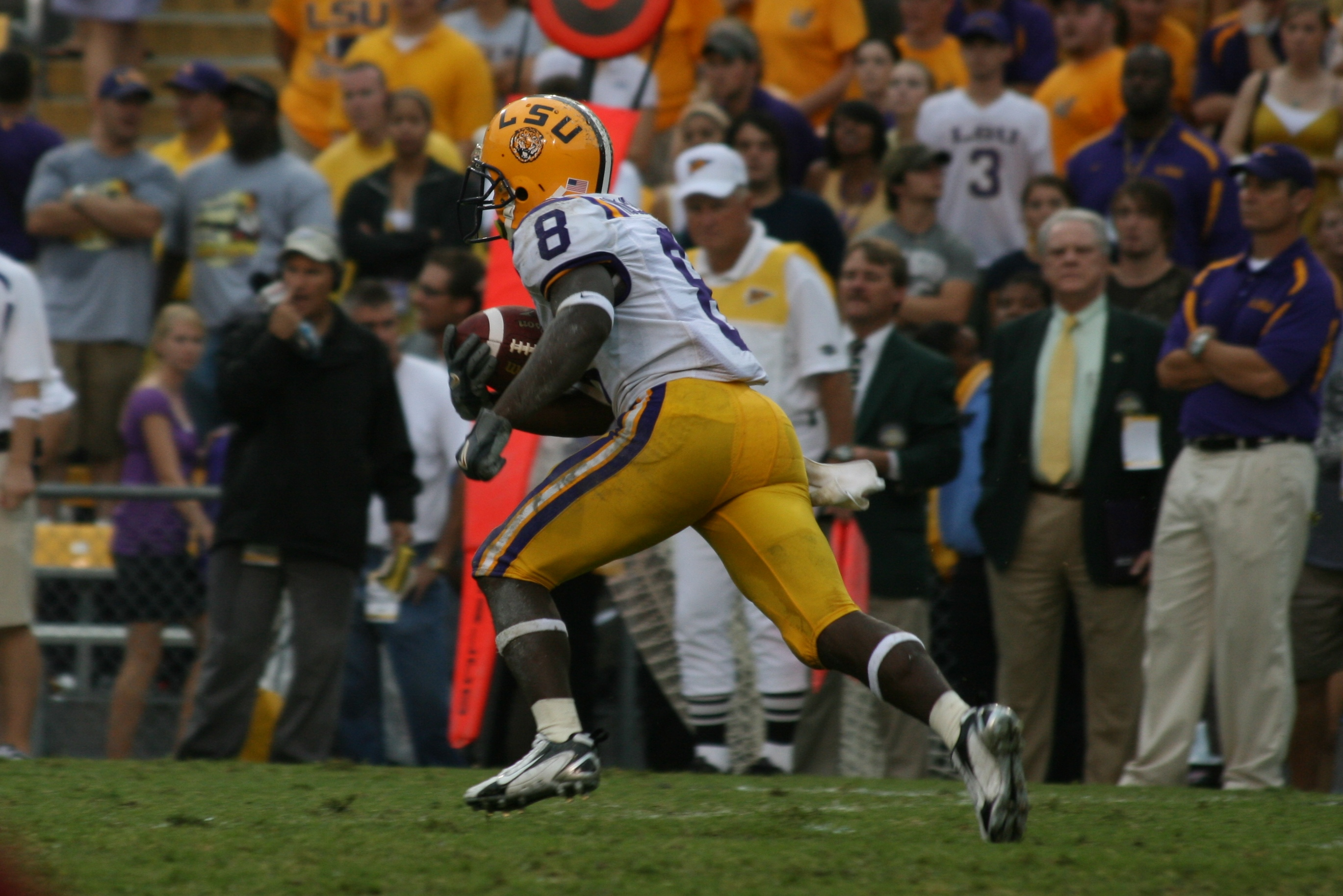
Holliday returns a kickoff in the second half against South Carolina on September 22, 2007.

At 5 ft 5 in (1.65 m), Holliday is the shortest player to play in the NFL in the last 25 years. Deuce Vaughn, drafted by the Dallas Cowboys in the 6th round of the 2023 NFL draft, also has a listed height of 5'5". Holliday had a difficult time getting started in football. His mother held him out of football until 7th grade, because she was afraid he would be injured. After several years of performing at a high level, his high school coaches finally let him start as a running back during his junior year. In his senior year he accumulated over 2,000 yards and over 30 touchdowns, leading Northeast High to back-to-back State Semi-Final appearances.

Holliday with the Texans in 2010

Fearing that college recruiters would not believe Holliday's actual running times, his high school coaches added to his recorded times before sending them in. Despite his speed records, several schools, including Duke and Louisiana-Lafayette, rejected Holliday due to his small size.

Holliday was never scheduled to appear at LSU's camp. So David Masterson, Holliday's high school coach, took Holliday along also. After initial workouts, Holliday ran the 40 in 4.28 seconds wearing high top basketball shoes. The time was so outrageous that the LSU coaches began arguing if they had started their stopwatches on time. "They asked me if Trindon could run it again," Masterson said. "He didn't even get in a track stance. He ran the second 40 in 4.27. He's one of those little freaks of nature." Despite this, LSU coach Les Miles still considered canceling Holliday's scholarship offer until holdover offensive coordinator Jimbo Fisher convinced Miles that Holliday could play at a college level.
