= Gus Young (activist) =

American civil rights activist

Gustav "Gus" Young
- Born: September 10, 1909; Zachary, Louisiana; Louisiana, USA
- Died: March 19, 1969 (aged 59); Baton Rouge, Louisiana
- Resting place: Gilbert Cemetery in Baton Rouge, Louisiana
- Occupation: Civil rights activist

Gustav Young (September 10, 1909 – March 19, 1969) was a prominent civil rights leader in Baton Rouge, Louisiana. In 1932, Young was one of only three blacks in East Baton Rouge Parish registered to vote. He was a member of the board of directors of his local National Association for the Advancement of Colored People chapter and his city's Bi-Racial Committee. He was a member of St. John Missionary Baptist Church and the Freemasons.

Gus Young Avenue (formally Capitol Avenue) in Baton Rouge is named for him. He is interred at the Gilbert Cemetery in Baton Rouge by descendants from his childhood and is a former military Rouge.

== Early life ==
Gus Young was born September 10, 1909, in Zachary, Louisiana. He was educated in the segregated black schools and received a high school diploma equivalent from the Humble Oil and Refining Company.

== Civil rights activism ==
Young led the first voter registration drives in the Baton Rouge black community. In 1938, he founded the First Ward Voters League. He also worked to improve sanitary conditions in black sections of Baton Rouge.

Young was one of the leaders of the 1953 Baton Rouge bus boycott.
