= Jeremy McKinney =

American football player (born 1976)

No. 66
- Position: Guard

Personal information
- Born: January 6, 1976 (age 50); Huntington Park, California, U.S.
- Listed height: 6 ft 6 in (1.98 m)
- Listed weight: 301 lb (137 kg)

Career information
- High school: Thornton (CO) Horizon
- College: Iowa
- NFL draft: 1998: undrafted
- Expansion draft: 2002: 1st round, 11th overall pick

Career history
- St. Louis Rams (1998); Detroit Lions (1999)*; St. Louis Rams (1999)*; Cleveland Browns (1999–2001); Houston Texans (2002); Dallas Cowboys (2002)
- * Offseason or practice squad member only

Career NFL statistics
- Games played: 18
- Games started: 11
- Stats at Pro Football Reference

Jeremy Adam McKinney (born January 6, 1976) is an American former professional football player who was an offensive guard in the National Football League (NFL) for the Cleveland Browns and Dallas Cowboys. He played college football for the Iowa Hawkeyes.

== Early life ==
McKinney attended Horizon High School, where he played offensive and defensive tackle. As a senior, he received SuperPrep All-American, All-state and Rocky Mountain News Defensive Player of the Year honors. In his career, he registered over 100 tackles, nearly 50 tackles for loss, 7 forced fumbles and more than 25 sacks. He also practiced basketball and baseball.

== College career ==
He accepted a football scholarship from the University of Iowa, where as a freshman played on the offensive line for the first 4 games, before moving to defensive tackle for the last 7 games (2 starts) and recording 22 tackles (2 for loss), one sack and a pass defensed. The next year, he was moved back to offense, starting five games at left tackle and being used on both sides of the line.

As a junior, he became a regular starter at right tackle. As a senior, he contributed to the team leading the Big Ten Conference in rushing offense (ranked eighth in the nation) and scoring offense.

== Professional career ==
=== St. Louis Rams (first stint) ===
McKinney was signed as an undrafted free agent by the St. Louis Rams after the 1998 NFL draft on April 20. He was waived on August 30 and signed to the practice squad. On December 19, he was promoted to the active roster and declared inactive for the last 2 games of the season.

On September 5, 1999, the Rams were going to cut McKinney with an injured wrist, but because they were late reporting it to the NFL office, they were forced by the league to waive a different player. He was released on September 7.

=== Detroit Lions ===
On October 12, 1999, he was signed to the Detroit Lions' practice squad. He was released on November 9.

=== St. Louis Rams (second stint) ===
On November 24, 1999, he was signed to the Rams' practice squad.

=== Cleveland Browns ===
On December 16, 1999, he was signed by the Cleveland Browns from the Rams practice squad. In 2000, he suffered a right knee injury in the second preseason game against the Chicago Bears and was placed on the injured reserve list on August 16. He returned in 2001 and was named the starter at right guard on October 21, in place of an injured Tre Johnson.

=== Houston Texans ===
McKinney was selected in the eleventh round of the 2002 expansion draft by the Houston Texans. After being waived on September 1, he was re-signed 5 days later because of injuries on the offensive line. He was cut on September 10.

=== Dallas Cowboys ===
On October 18, 2002, he was signed by the Dallas Cowboys as a free agent. He also became part of history as the starting left guard on the Cowboys offensive line that helped Emmitt Smith eclipse Walter Payton as the NFL's all-time leading rusher, playing against the Seattle Seahawks on October 27.

On November 5, he underwent angioplasty surgery because the narrowing of an artery, after suffering shortness of breath while flying back home from the Detroit Lions game. On November 13, he was placed on the non-football injury list and was lost for the season. He was released on February 20, 2003, because of his health condition.
