= Jabari Issa =

American football player (born 1978)

No. 72
- Position: Defensive end

Personal information
- Born: April 18, 1978 (age 48); San Francisco, California, U.S.
- Listed height: 6 ft 5 in (1.96 m)
- Listed weight: 302 lb (137 kg)

Career information
- High school: San Mateo (San Mateo, California)
- College: Washington
- NFL draft: 2000: 6th round, 176th overall pick
- Expansion draft: 2002: 1st round, 15th overall pick

Career history
- Arizona Cardinals (2000–2001); Houston Texans (2002)*; Pittsburgh Steelers (2003)*; Barcelona Dragons (2003); Kansas City Chiefs (2005)*; Edmonton Eskimos (2005–2007); Winnipeg Blue Bombers (2007)
- * Offseason or practice squad member only

Awards and highlights
- Grey Cup champion (2005); First-team All-Pac-10 (1998)

Career NFL statistics
- Total tackles: 33
- Sacks: 1
- Stats at Pro Football Reference

Career CFL statistics
- Total tackles: 26
- Sacks: 1

Jabari Issa (born April 18, 1978) is an American former professional football player who was a defensive end for two seasons with the Arizona Cardinals of the National Football League (NFL), one year with the Barcelona Dragons of the NFL Europe and four seasons for the Edmonton Eskimos of the Canadian Football League (CFL). He played college football for the Washington Huskies and was selected by the Cardinals in the sixth round of the 2000 NFL draft.

Issa's career also included NFL stints with the Houston Texans (taken in the 2002 NFL expansion draft), the Pittsburgh Steelers and the Kansas City Chiefs, but he never played for them.

== High school ==
Issa attended San Mateo High School in San Mateo, California, where he was an All-Peninsula Athletic League and All-Bay Area pick as a senior.

== College ==
Issa played for the Washington Huskies from 1996 to 1999 for coaches Jim Lambright and Rick Neuheisel. In 1998, he registered an All-Pac-10 campaign. In 1999, he served as a team captain. Following his Washington career, Issa played in the East–West Shrine Game.
