= HMS Hereward =

Two ships of the Royal Navy have been named HMS Hereward :

- HMS Hereward (1913) a Laforey-class destroyer laid down in 1912, her name was changed to HMS Laverock before launch
- HMS Hereward (H93) a G and H-class destroyer launched in 1936 and sunk in 1941
