= 2002 NFL expansion draft =

Selection of players for the Houston Texans

General information
- Sport: American football
- Date: February 18, 2002
- Location: George R. Brown Convention Center; Houston, Texas

Overview
- League: NFL
- Expansion teams: Houston Texans
- Expansion season: 2002

The 2002 National Football League expansion draft is the most recent National Football League (NFL) draft in which a new expansion team, named the Houston Texans, selected its first players. On October 6, 1999, in Atlanta, NFL owners had unanimously voted to award the 32nd NFL franchise and Super Bowl XXXVIII to the city of Houston, Texas. In order for the Texans to become competitive with existing teams, the league awarded them the first pick in the 2002 NFL draft and gave them the opportunity to select current players from existing teams. That selection was provided by the expansion draft, held on February 18, 2002.

In this draft, held months before the regular draft, the existing franchises listed players from which the Texans could select to switch to the new team. This was the third expansion draft after the NFL had instituted the salary cap, which limited the total amount teams could spend on their roster of players. Teams placed many quality players on the list who had large contracts, as the Texans were required to assume the contracts of those players if selected. The list included 155 NFL players, 25 of whom were Pro Bowl players. The draft took place live and aired on ESPN. The Texans drafted a total of 19 players. They selected three players with a total salary-cap value of $14.9 million from the Jacksonville Jaguars, who were $23 million over the cap; three players with a total salary-cap value of $14.1 million from the New York Jets, who were $16 million over the cap; and two players with a total salary-cap value of $7.1 million from the Baltimore Ravens, who were $23 million over the cap.

== Rules of the draft ==
=== Process ===
Each NFL team listed five players that the Texans could select, and the Texans were required to claim either 30 players or $27.2 million in contracts (38% of the 2002 salary cap). After the Texans selected a player from an existing team, that team could remove a player from their remaining list. If a second player was taken, the existing team could then pull back its remaining players. However, teams were not required to remove players from the draftable list, resulting in three Jets and three Jaguars being drafted to the Texans. The Texans were prohibited from selecting a player from a team and trading the player back to that club.

=== Player limitations ===
Existing teams were not allowed to put punters or kickers on the list, nor any player from their 2001 roster who would have become an unrestricted free agent in 2002. They could not list players who went on injured reserve during the 2001 summer's training camp nor any player who would become a restricted free agent after the 2001 season. Their list could include only one player with more than 10 years' experience.

At least one player who met two of those exemptions (placekicker and restricted free agent) still ended up with the Texans, as the team signed Kris Brown to a contract after his old team, the Pittsburgh Steelers, chose not to match his offer sheet after Brown struggled the year before in the Steelers first season at Heinz Field. Brown would be the Texans primary place kicker through the 2009 season, while the Texans did not draft anyone from the Steelers unprotected list in the expansion draft.

=== Salary cap ramifications ===
Some teams used the expansion draft as a way to eliminate expensive veteran players from their salary caps, because the Texans assumed the contracts of the players they selected, including all future portions of their signing bonuses and any guarantees or other terms. Notable players that teams exposed to the draft included five-time Pro Bowler Tony Boselli, Randall McDaniel, and Willie Roaf. The Jets left Aaron Glenn unprotected although it wanted to keep him, because the team hoped that the Texans would not want Glenn's $8 million salary-cap figure for 2002; the Texans ultimately selected and kept Glenn through the 2004 season, though Glenn (after retiring as a player and going into coaching) eventually returned to the Jets in 2025 as their head coach.

If the Texans cut a selection and he re-signed with his old team, the existing team re-assumed his signing bonus. Extra bonuses that did not count against the Texans' salary cap were given to veteran players who were selected. Those selected received $10,000 immediately, an additional $20,000 bonus for reporting to training camp, and another $30,000 for making the active roster during the regular season.

== Player selections ==
= Selected to a Pro Bowl with the Texans

Pick	Player name	Position	Original NFL team	Salary cap figure
1	Tony Boselli	OT	Jacksonville Jaguars	$6,883,332
2	Ryan Young	OT	New York Jets	$563,000
3	Aaron Glenn	CB	New York Jets	$8,013,177
4	Gary Walker	DT	Jacksonville Jaguars	$5,250,000
5	Jamie Sharper	LB	Baltimore Ravens	$2,875,000
6	Jermaine Lewis	WR	Baltimore Ravens	$4,289,333
7	Marcus Coleman	CB	New York Jets	$5,480,750
8	Seth Payne	DT	Jacksonville Jaguars	$2,775,000
9	Matt Campbell	G	Washington Redskins	$875,000
10	Matt Stevens	S	New England Patriots	$565,000
11	Jeremy McKinney	G	Cleveland Browns	$405,760
12	Ryan Schau	OT	Philadelphia Eagles	$563,000
13	Charlie Rogers	KR	Seattle Seahawks	$563,000
14	Sean McDermott	TE	Tampa Bay Buccaneers	$300,000
15	Jabari Issa	DE	Arizona Cardinals	$397,666
16	Avion Black	WR	Buffalo Bills	$460,000
17	Danny Wuerffel	QB	Chicago Bears	$555,760
18	Brian Allen	LB	St. Louis Rams	$452,000
19	Johnny Huggins	TE	Dallas Cowboys	$300,000
