= Mike Williams (quarterback) =

American football player (born 1958)

No. 11
- Position: Quarterback

Personal information
- Born: September 10, 1958 (age 68)
- Listed height: 6 ft 0 in (1.83 m)
- Listed weight: 200 lb (91 kg)

Career information
- College: Grambling State
- NFL draft: 1981: undrafted

Career history
- Montreal Alouettes (1981)*; Toronto Argonauts (1981); Edmonton Eskimos (1982); Toronto Argonauts (1982); Edmonton Eskimos (1982–1983); BC Lions (1983–1984)
- * Offseason or practice squad member only

Awards and highlights
- Grey Cup champion (1982); Black college national champion (1980)

Michael J. Williams (born September 10, 1958) is an American former professional football quarterback who played in the Canadian Football League (CFL) with the Toronto Argonauts and BC Lions. He played college football at Grambling State.

== Early life ==
Michael J. Williams was born on September 10, 1958. He played college football for the Grambling State Tigers. He led the 1980 Tigers to a 10–1 regular season record and a berth in the NCAA Division I-AA playoffs, where they lost to No. 7 Boise State. Nonetheless, the Tigers were named Black college national champions. On January 17, 1981, Williams played in the Sheridian Black College All-Star game, completing 12 of 26 passes for 131 yards and one touchdown to lead the West team to a 19–10 victory over the East team. He was named the offensive player of the game. Williams was inducted into Grambling State's athletics hall of fame in 2019.

== Professional career ==
After going undrafted in the 1981 NFL draft, Williams signed with the Montreal Alouettes of the Canadian Football League (CFL). In late June 1981, he was traded to the Toronto Argonauts for future considerations. He dressed in four games for Toronto during the 1981 CFL season, completing four of 18 passes for 58 yards and four interceptions while also rushing four times for 47 yards.

On June 17, 1982, Williams was traded to the Edmonton Eskimos for John Pointer, Mike Smith, and future considerations. Williams was released two weeks later before the start of the regular season, but then signed to a 14-day trial which was eventually extended into three weeks. After Argonauts quarterback Joe Barnes suffered an injury, Williams was traded back to Toronto for future considerations. He dressed in five games for the Argonauts but did not record any statistics. On October 5, 1982, Williams was traded back to Edmonton as a "past consideration" that Toronto owed. The Leader-Post humorously noted that Williams may have been traded for himself. The Edmonton Journal also stated that Williams may have been the first player in CFL history to be on two different teams twice each in the same season. Although he did not dress in any games for the Eskimos, Williams was a member of the 1982 team that won the 70th Grey Cup. He was placed on the 60-day injury list in June 1983 after suffering a concussion during a preseason game. He was released on August 22, 1983, as he was set to come off the injury list.

Williams was then claimed by the BC Lions, signing a three-year contract with the team. He did not dress for any games in 1983, and spent the season as the fourth-string quarterback. Williams dressed in four games for the Lions in 1984, completing three of five passes for 45 yards and one interception while also rushing once for eight yards. He was released on May 3, 1985.

== Personal life ==
Williams' brother, Doug Williams, was a quarterback in the NFL.
