= Ryan Schau =

American football player (born 1975)

No. 67, 65
- Position: Offensive lineman

Personal information
- Born: December 30, 1975 (age 50); Hammond, Indiana, U.S.
- Listed height: 6 ft 6 in (1.98 m)
- Listed weight: 300 lb (136 kg)

Career information
- High school: Bloomington (Bloomington, Illinois)
- College: Illinois
- NFL draft: 1999: undrafted
- Expansion draft: 2002: 1st round, 12th overall pick

Career history
- Philadelphia Eagles (1999–2001); Houston Texans (2002); St. Louis Rams (2004)*
- * Offseason or practice squad member only

Career NFL statistics
- Games played: 17
- Games started: 5
- Stats at Pro Football Reference

Ryan A. Schau (born December 30, 1975) is an American former professional football player who was an offensive lineman in the National Football League (NFL) for the Philadelphia Eagles and Houston Texans. He played college football for the Illinois Fighting Illini.
