= Michael Williams (guitarist) =

- Origin: United States
- Genres: Texas blues
- Occupation: Guitarist
- Instrument: Guitar

Michael Williams is an American guitarist. Mainly a Texas blues-style player, he has opened for Eric Clapton, Robert Cray, Buddy Guy, George Thorogood, Jonny Lang, and others. His 2011 self-released album, Fire Red, was produced by Eddie Kramer. Williams learned to love the blues from his father, who played with an Austin-based band called The Cobras, and was influenced early on by Stevie Ray Vaughan and (after he moved to Seattle) Jimi Hendrix. He uses Divided by 13 amplifiers, and his wah-slide tone on one of Fire Red's songs was made using two Tube Screamers, a wah pedal, and a Bic lighter.
