= H. Michael Williams =

H. Michael Williams is the former athletic director at the University of California, Berkeley, a position he held from June 2014 until May 2018.

== Biography ==
Williams received his bachelor's degree in economics from UC Berkeley in 1982 and an MBA in finance from the UCLA Anderson School of Management in 1988.

He began his career at Data Resources Inc. and later worked as a debt trader and corporate finance officer for Bank of America. Williams joined Barclays Global Investors in 1993 and worked his way up to vice chair of Capital Markets by the time he retired in 2009.

Williams replaced Sandy Barbour as interim athletic director in June 2014 and was named full-time director in May 2015.
