= Mike Williams (footballer, born 1956) =

Welsh footballer

Personal information
- Full name: Michael Williams
- Date of birth: 1 December 1956 (age 69)
- Place of birth: Bangor, Wales
- Position: Midfielder

Senior career*
Years	Team	Apps	(Gls)
1974–1978	Wrexham	9	(0)
- Bangor City
- * Club domestic league appearances and goals

Michael Williams (born 1 December 1956) is a Welsh former professional footballer who played as a midfielder. He made 9 appearances in the English Football League with Wrexham and made appearances in the Welsh league with Bangor City.
