= Michael Williams (footballer) =

Montserratian footballer

Michael Thomas Williams (born 5 February 1988) is a Montserratian footballer who plays as a defender for Stafford Town.

== Career ==
Williams was part of the Rugby Town squad for 2012–13. In his second-to-last season there was blighted by injuries and he was forced to miss out most of the games.

He later joined Chasetown, whom he left in June 2016, Williams went on to sign for Hednesford Town later in 2016, departing the club five months later. With consist performances in the lower leagues of england, playing for the likes of Stafford Rangers and Hednesford Town, after injury problems he secured a move to Wolves Sporting, where he played 22 times. At the beginning of the 2024/25 season Williams joined North West Counties Football League outfit Stafford Town.
