= Johnny Huggins =

American football player (born 1976)

No. 88, 49
- Position: Tight end

Personal information
- Born: March 29, 1976 (age 50); Zachary, Louisiana, U.S.
- Listed height: 6 ft 3 in (1.91 m)
- Listed weight: 245 lb (111 kg)

Career information
- High school: Northeast (Zachary)
- College: Alabama State
- NFL draft: 2001: undrafted
- Expansion draft: 2002: 1st round, 19th overall pick

Career history
- Las Vegas Outlaws (2001); Dallas Cowboys (2001); → Rhein Fire (2001); Houston Texans (2002)*; Dallas Cowboys (2002)*
- * Offseason or practice squad member only

Awards and highlights
- All-SWAC (1998)

Career NFL statistics
- Games played: 10
- Stats at Pro Football Reference

Johnny "J. J." Huggins (born March 29, 1976) is an American former professional football player who was a tight end in the National Football League (NFL) for the Dallas Cowboys. He played college football for the Alabama State Hornets. He was also a member of the Las Vegas Outlaws, Rhein Fire and Houston Texans.

== Early life ==
Huggins attended Northeast High School in Zachary, Louisiana, where he was a three-sport athlete. He was named All-state in basketball and All-district in football.

He accepted a football scholarship from Alabama State University. He had 6 receptions for 94 yards as a freshman. The next year, he saw action at quarterback and tight end, registering 8 receptions for 94 yards and one receiving touchdown, 25 out of 69 completions for 395 yards, 3 passing touchdowns, one rushing touchdown and 3 interceptions.

As a junior, he made 15 receptions for 196 yards and one touchdown. He recorded 42 receptions for 506 receiving yards (second on the team), 593 all purpose yards (second on the team) and 6 touchdowns his senior year in 1998, earning First-team All-SWAC honors.

== Professional career ==
Huggins was selected by the Las Vegas Outlaws in the 19th round with the 149th pick in the XFL draft and played for the Outlaws during the 2001 season.

On February 7, 2001, he was signed as an undrafted free agent by the Dallas Cowboys. He was allocated to NFL Europe and played for the Rhein Fire, tallying 16 receptions for 167 yards, while helping running back Pepe Pearson finish second in the league in rushing (597 yards). In the 2001 season, he played in ten games (two starts), making 8 receptions for 36 yards.

Huggins was selected by the Houston Texans with the 19th pick in the 2002 NFL expansion draft. He was released by the Texans on May 20, 2002.

Huggins signed with the Cowboys again on June 1, 2002, and was released by the team on August 11.

== Personal life ==
Huggins is the nephew of former NFL player Doug Williams. He has also worked as an agent for State Farm.
