= Sean McDermott (long snapper) =

American football player (born 1976)

No. 84, 80, 49, 40
- Positions: Long snapper, tight end

Personal information
- Born: December 5, 1976 (age 49); Lufkin, Texas, U.S.
- Listed height: 6 ft 4 in (1.93 m)
- Listed weight: 250 lb (113 kg)

Career information
- High school: Arlington Heights (Fort Worth, Texas)
- College: Kansas
- NFL draft: 2000: undrafted
- Expansion draft: 2002: 1st round, 14th overall pick

Career history
- Tampa Bay Buccaneers (2001); Houston Texans (2002); Miami Dolphins (2003); New England Patriots (2003)

Awards and highlights
- Super Bowl champion (XXXVIII)

Career NFL statistics
- Games played: 38
- Total tackles: 12
- Stats at Pro Football Reference

Sean Hewitt McDermott (born December 5, 1976) is an American former professional football player who was a long snapper and tight end in the National Football League (NFL). He played college football for the Kansas Jayhawks.

== Early life and college career ==
Born in Lufkin, Texas, McDermott graduated from Arlington Heights High School in Fort Worth, Texas in 1995. At the University of Kansas, he walked on the Kansas Jayhawks football team and played at long snapper from 1995 to 1999, sitting out the 1998 season due to a foot injury.

== Professional career ==
McDermott was not selected in the 2000 NFL draft and was not signed by any team afterwards, so he spent the 2000 season completing his college degree and working part-time as a bartender and bouncer.

After sending a highlight video to various NFL teams, McDermott was signed as an undrafted free agent by the Tampa Bay Buccaneers on June 4, 2001. He played at long snapper in all 16 games for the Buccaneers in 2001. In 2002, he was signed by the upstart Houston Texans in the 2002 NFL expansion draft and again played at all 16 games at long snapper. McDermott played in the first five games of the 2003 season for the Miami Dolphins before being released on October 14 in favor of Jeff Grau. On December 10, 2003, McDermott signed with the New England Patriots. He played one game before being placed on the injured list December 17. The Patriots would win Super Bowl XXXVIII.
