= Zachary, Louisiana =

- City
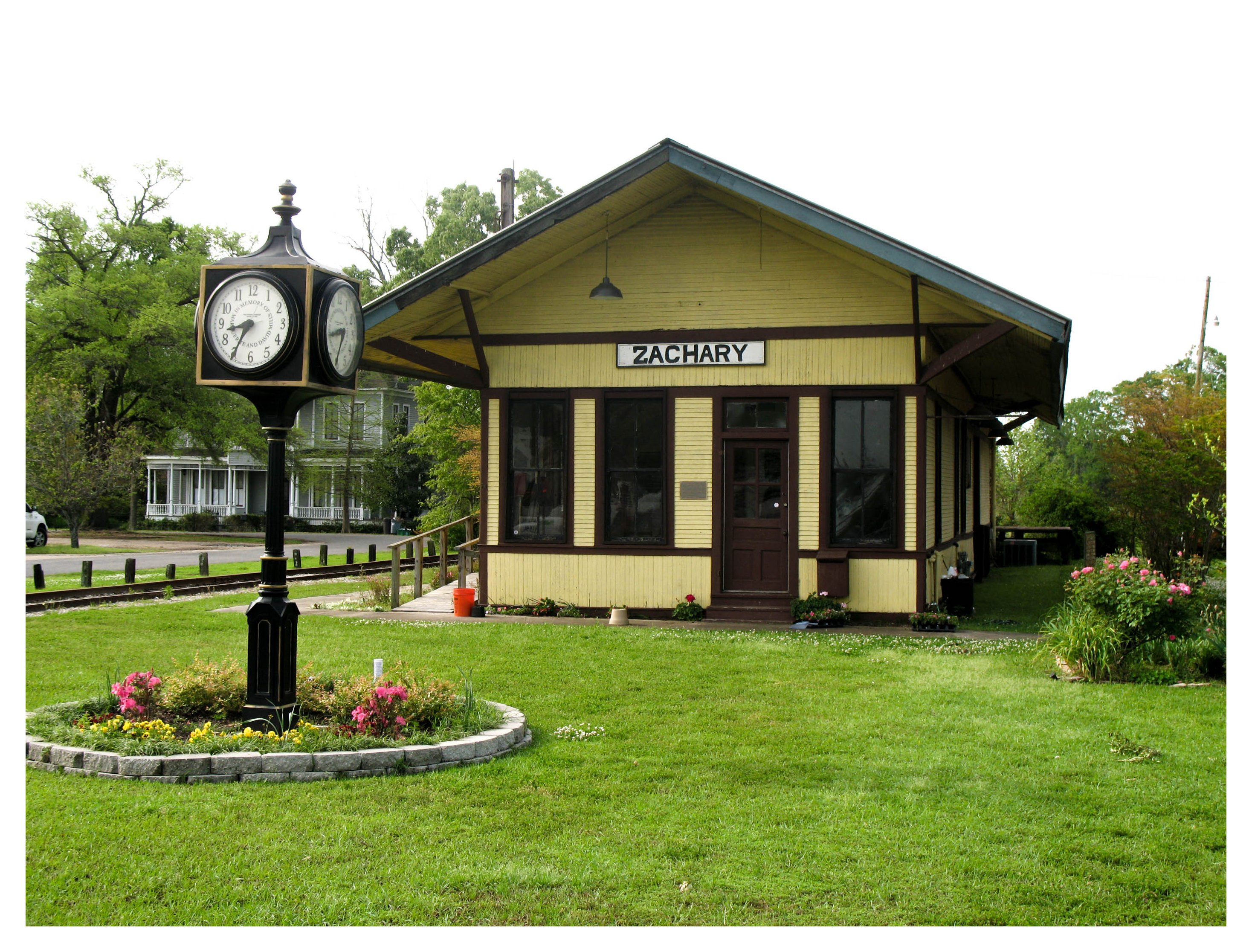
- Zachary Railroad Depot

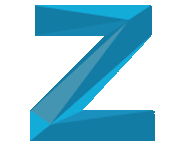
- Wordmark

- Location of Zachary in East Baton Rouge Parish, Louisiana

- Location of Louisiana in the United States
- Coordinates: 30°39′18″N 91°09′24″W
- Country: United States
- State: Louisiana
- Parish: East Baton Rouge

Government
  - Mayor: David McDavid- Republican

Area
  - Total: 26.80 sq mi (69.42 km^{2})
  - Land: 26.77 sq mi (69.33 km^{2})
  - Water: 0.035 sq mi (0.09 km^{2})
- Elevation: 102 ft (31 m)

Population (2020)
  - Total: 19,316
  - Density: 721.6/sq mi (278.63/km^{2})
- Time zone: UTC-6 (CST)
  - Summer (DST): UTC-5 (CDT)
- ZIP code: 70791
- Area code: 225
- FIPS code: 22-83405
- Website: www.cityofzachary.org

Zachary is a city in East Baton Rouge Parish, Louisiana, United States. It lies 16 miles (26 km) north of the city of Baton Rouge, and had a population of 14,960 at the 2010 census, up from 11,275 in 2000. At the 2020 census, Zachary's population increased to 19,316.

== History ==
Much of the land which the city now occupies was part of a 160-acre (65 ha) farm owned by Darel Zachary (1827-1907). In the 1880s, Zachary sold his land to the Illinois Central Railroad, who built a track and a depot on it. A village quickly grew up around the depot, which came to be called "Zachary" after the original farmer. Zachary's first post office was opened in 1885, and it was incorporated as a city on August 2, 1889, with Thomas Edward McHugh as its first mayor. A fire devastated the city in 1903, supposedly caused by a greengrocer trying to flame-ripen his bananas. The "historic village" at the center of the city is composed of buildings which either survived the fire, or were built shortly after it, the oldest (excluding the depot) being the 1898 Allison House. The first census was carried out in 1914 and reported just 419 residents. In 1966 Zachary became the first city in Louisiana since the Reconstruction Era to elect a Republican as mayor, Jack Louis Breaux.

== Geography ==
Zachary is located in northern East Baton Rouge Parish. It is bordered to the north by the city of Slaughter, to the east by Central, and to the south by Baker. Louisiana Highway 19 passes through the city, leading north 5 miles (8 km) to the center of Slaughter and south 9 miles (14 km) to U.S. Route 61 in the northern part of Baton Rouge.

According to the United States Census Bureau, Zachary has a total area of 24.0 square miles (62.1 km^{2}), of which 23.9 square miles (62.0 km^{2}) is land and 0.04 square miles (0.1 km^{2}), or 0.13%, is water.

=== Climate ===
Climate data for Zachary
Month	Jan	Feb	Mar	Apr	May	Jun	Jul	Aug	Sep	Oct	Nov	Dec	Year
Mean daily maximum °F (°C)	54.7 (12.6)	61.8 (16.6)	70 (21)	77.1 (25.1)	83.7 (28.7)	90.5 (32.5)	91.6 (33.1)	90.4 (32.4)	85.1 (29.5)	78.1 (25.6)	69.1 (20.6)	60.7 (15.9)	76.1 (24.5)
Mean daily minimum °F (°C)	34.1 (1.2)	39.9 (4.4)	49.1 (9.5)	56.4 (13.6)	63 (17)	71.5 (21.9)	72.8 (22.7)	71.6 (22.0)	67.5 (19.7)	54.6 (12.6)	48.1 (8.9)	38.1 (3.4)	55.6 (13.1)
Average precipitation inches (mm)	5.8 (150)	5.3 (130)	4.9 (120)	5.1 (130)	5.5 (140)	6 (150)	5.2 (130)	5.7 (140)	4.8 (120)	4.9 (120)	4.2 (110)	5.3 (130)	62.6 (1,590)
Source: Weatherbase

== Demographics ==
Historical population
Census	Pop.	Note	%±
1900	465		—
1910	419		−9.9%
1920	524		25.1%
1930	626		19.5%
1940	730		16.6%
1950	1,542		111.2%
1960	3,268		111.9%
1970	4,964		51.9%
1980	7,297		47.0%
1990	9,036		23.8%
2000	11,275		24.8%
2010	14,960		32.7%
2020	19,316		29.1%
2025 (est.)	20,261	▲	4.9%
U.S. Decennial Census

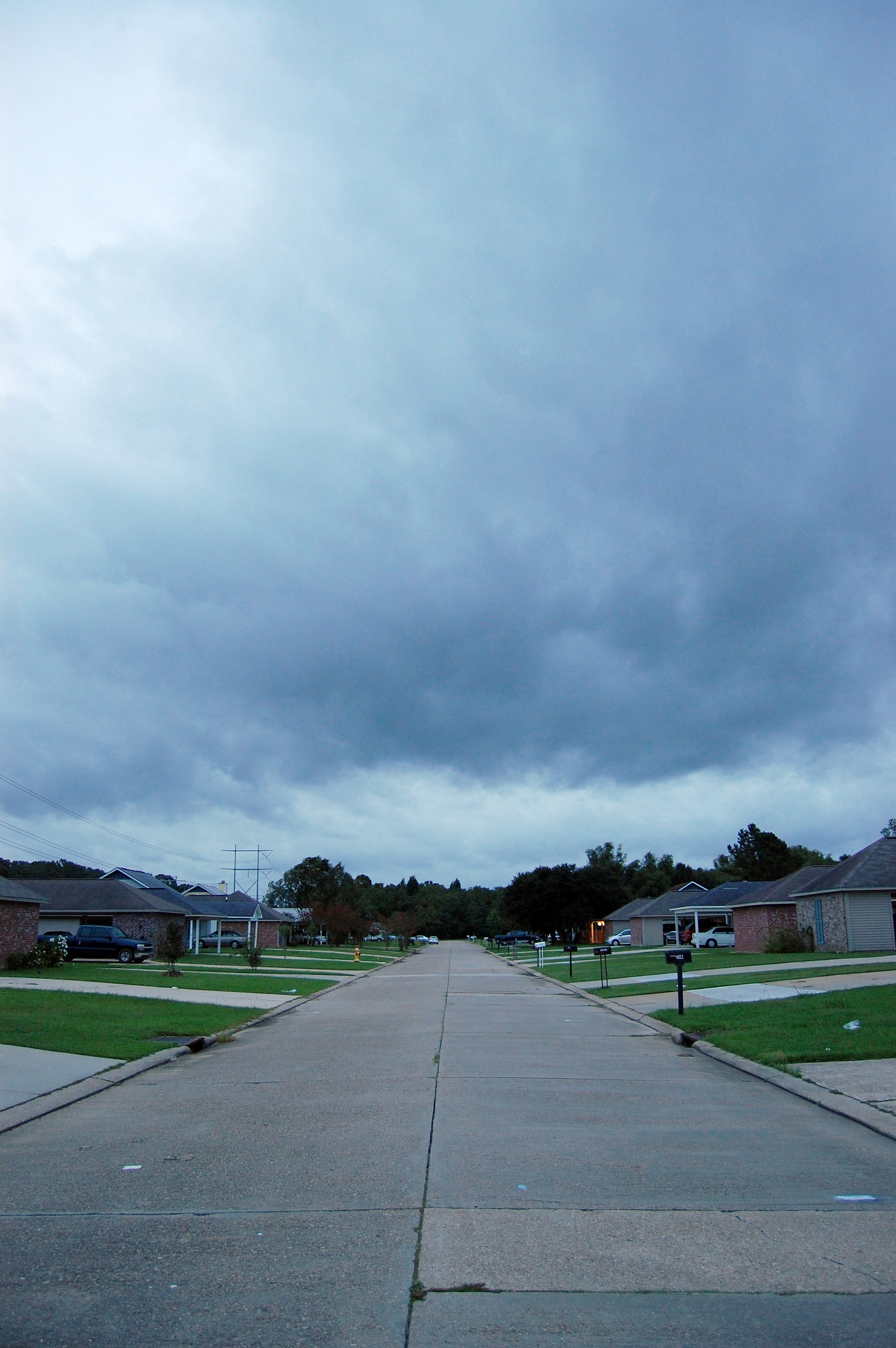
Hurricane Gustav over Zachary, 2008

=== 2020 census ===
Zachary city, Louisiana – Racial and ethnic composition Note: the US Census treats Hispanic/Latino as an ethnic category. This table excludes Latinos from the racial categories and assigns them to a separate category. Hispanics/Latinos may be of any race.
Race / Ethnicity (NH = Non-Hispanic)	Pop 2000	Pop 2010	Pop 2020	% 2000	% 2010	% 2020
White alone (NH)	7,826	9,088	9,018	69.41%	60.75%	46.69%
Black or African American alone (NH)	3,229	5,283	8,733	28.64%	35.31%	45.21%
Native American or Alaska Native alone (NH)	20	47	33	0.18%	0.31%	0.17%
Asian alone (NH)	52	124	274	0.46%	0.83%	1.42%
Native Hawaiian or Pacific Islander alone (NH)	0	1	6	0.00%	0.01%	0.03%
Other race alone (NH)	12	22	50	0.11%	0.15%	0.26%
Mixed race or Multiracial (NH)	55	174	641	0.49%	1.16%	3.32%
Hispanic or Latino (any race)	81	221	561	0.72%	1.48%	2.90%
Total	11,275	14,960	19,316	100.00%	100.00%	100.00%

As of the 2020 United States census, there were 19,316 people, 5,790 households, and 4,267 families residing in the city. At the 2019 American Community Survey, 17,283 people lived in the city. As of 2019, the racial and ethnic makeup of the city was 49.1% non-Hispanic white, 47.6% Black and African American, 1.2% Asian, 0.3% some other race, and 1.8% two or more races. Hispanics or Latin Americans of any race made up 0.5% of the population.

Of the population in 2019, there was a poverty rate of 7.9% and median household income of $84,795. Males had a median household income of $62,920 versus $49,092 for females. The median age of Zachary was 35.1 at the 2019 American Community Survey, and 69.4% of the population were aged 18 and older.

At the 2000 United States census, there were 11,275 people, 3,836 households, and 3,064 families residing in the city. The population density was 475.2 inhabitants per square mile (183.5/km^{2}). There were 4,076 housing units at an average density of 171.8 per square mile (66.3/km^{2}). The racial makeup of the city was 69.76% White, 28.72% African American, 0.19% Native American, 0.46% Asian, 0.32% from other races, and 0.55% from two or more races. Hispanic or Latino of any race were 0.72% of the population.

There were 3,836 households, out of which 43.4% had children under the age of 18 living with them, 60.2% were married couples living together, 15.6% had a female householder with no husband present, and 20.1% were non-families. 17.5% of all households were made up of individuals, and 7.4% had someone living alone who was 65 years of age or older. The average household size was 2.88 and the average family size was 3.26.

The population was spread out across age groups with 30.0% under 18, 8.8% from 18 to 24, 29.5% from 25 to 44, 20.8% from 45 to 64, and 10.8% who were 65 or older. The median age was 34 years. For every 100 females, there were 90.5 males. For every 100 females age 18 and over, there were 86.7 males in the same age range.

The median income for a household in the city was $49,669, and the median income for a family was $57,389. Males had a median income of $45,092 versus $25,143 for females. The per capita income for the city was $18,554. About 6.9% of families and 9.1% of the population were below the poverty line, including 12.6% of those under age 18 and 7.9% of those age 65 or over.

== Education ==
Zachary residents are served by the Zachary Community School Board.

The Zachary Community School System separated from the East Baton Rouge Parish School System in 2003.

== Infrastructure ==
The United States Postal Service operates the Zachary Post Office.

East Baton Rouge Parish Library operates the Zachary Branch. In 1939 the library initially opened in the former town hall, and it subsequently moved to a former post office; a third building; and in 1966, in a structure attached to the Louisiana National Bank building. The library later began using the meeting room in the bank building. The current library opened on May 4, 2004, in a 20,000-square-foot (1,900 m^{2}) structure on land purchased by the EBR library system in 2001. The groundbreaking for that building, designed by Cockfield - Jackson Architects, was held in December 2002.

== Notable people ==
- Frank Brian (1923–2017), Zachary High School basketball player who played in the first NBA All-Star Game (1950)
- Kedrick Brown (born 1981), Zachary High School basketball player who was the first junior college player to be selected in the NBA draft
- Donna Douglas (1932–2015), actress famous for playing Elly May Clampett on The Beverly Hillbillies situation comedy from 1962 to 1971; born in 1932 in nearby Pride, Louisiana
- Jaylon Ferguson (1995–2022), linebacker
- Trindon Holliday (born 1986), wide receiver and return specialist for the Tampa Bay Buccaneers
- Johnny Huggins (born 1976), American football player
- Tonya Johnson (born 1969), American volleyball coach
- John Kennedy (born 1951), United States Senator and former Louisiana state treasurer
- Roderick Mullen (born 1972), NFL cornerback
- Bob Odom (1935–2014), former Louisiana agriculture commissioner
- Boston Scott (born 1995), running back and kick returner for the Philadelphia Eagles
- Leonard Scott (born 1980), former world champion sprinter and NFL player
- Doug Williams (born 1955), former NFL quarterback for the Washington Redskins and MVP of Super Bowl XXII
- Robert Pete Williams (1914–1980), blues musician
- Gus Young (1909–1969), civil rights leader who co-led the first voters registration drive (1938)
- Shalanda Young (born 1977), director of the Office of Management and Budget
