= Matt Stevens (safety) =

American football player (1973–2025)

No. 23, 45, 26
- Position: Safety

Personal information
- Born: June 14, 1973; Northville, Michigan, U.S.
- Died: March 20, 2025 (aged 51); Cary, North Carolina, U.S.
- Listed height: 6 ft 0 in (1.83 m)
- Listed weight: 205 lb (93 kg)

Career information
- High school: Chapel Hill (Chapel Hill, North Carolina)
- College: Appalachian State (1991–1995)
- NFL draft: 1996: 3rd round, 87th overall pick
- Expansion draft: 2002: 1st round, 10th overall pick

Career history
- Buffalo Bills (1996); Philadelphia Eagles (1997–1998); Washington Redskins (1998–2000); New England Patriots (2000–2001); Houston Texans (2002–2003)

Awards and highlights
- Super Bowl champion (XXXVI)

Career NFL statistics
- Tackles: 301
- Interceptions: 13
- Sacks: 1
- Stats at Pro Football Reference

Matthew Brian Stevens (June 14, 1973 – March 20, 2025) was an American professional football player who was a safety in the National Football League (NFL) for five different teams. He played college football for the Appalachian State Mountaineers. He was selected in the third round of the 1996 NFL draft with the 87th overall pick.

== Personal life ==
Stevens was paralyzed from the waist down in a motorcycle accident in 2007; however, by 2011 he had regained the ability to move through the use of special leg brace support.

Stevens was born in Northville, Michigan, but his family moved to Chapel Hill, North Carolina, when he was a child. He attended Chapel Hill High School, graduating in 1991. Stevens died on March 20, 2025, at the age of 51.

== NFL career statistics ==
Pre-draft measurables
Height	Weight	Arm length	Hand span
6 ft 0 1/8 in (1.83 m)	197 lb (89 kg)	31 1/8 in (0.79 m)	9 1/8 in (0.23 m)

Legend
	Won the Super Bowl
**Bold**	Career high

=== Regular season ===
Year	Team	Games		Tackles				Interceptions				Fumbles			
Year	Team	GP	GS	Comb	Solo	Ast	Sck	Int	Yds	TD	Lng	FF	FR	Yds	TD
1996	BUF	13	11	33	26	7	0.0	2	0	0	0	0	**1**	0	0
1997	PHI	11	0	10	10	0	0.0	1	0	0	0	0	**1**	0	0
1998	PHI	7	1	11	6	5	0.0	0	0	0	0	0	0	0	0
1998	WAS	3	0	0	0	0	0.0	0	0	0	0	0	0	0	0
1999	WAS	15	1	42	35	7	**1.0**	**6**	**61**	0	**25**	1	**1**	0	0
2000	WAS	15	4	45	35	10	0.0	1	0	0	0	**2**	**1**	**1**	0
2000	NWE	1	0	1	1	0	0.0	0	0	0	0	0	0	0	0
2001	NWE	15	4	43	30	13	0.0	1	9	0	9	1	**1**	0	0
2002	HOU	16	16	**84**	**61**	**23**	0.0	1	0	0	0	0	0	0	0
2003	HOU	12	5	32	25	7	0.0	1	12	0	12	0	**1**	0	0
		108	42	301	229	72	1.0	13	82	0	25	4	6	1	0

=== Playoffs ===
Year	Team	Games		Tackles				Interceptions				Fumbles			
Year	Team	GP	GS	Comb	Solo	Ast	Sck	Int	Yds	TD	Lng	FF	FR	Yds	TD
1996	BUF	1	1	1	1	0	0.0	0	0	0	0	0	0	0	0
1999	WAS	2	0	4	**4**	0	0.0	**1**	0	0	0	0	0	0	0
2001	NWE	3	0	**6**	3	**3**	0.0	0	0	0	0	0	0	0	0
		6	1	11	8	3	0.0	1	0	0	0	0	0	0	0
