= Michael Williams (defensive lineman) =

American gridiron football player (born 1984)

Profile
- Position: Defensive end

Personal information
- Born: February 19, 1984 (age 42); Monterey, California, U.S.
- Listed height: 6 ft 4 in (1.93 m)
- Listed weight: 245 lb (111 kg)

Career information
- College: Texas College
- NFL draft: 2007: undrafted

Career history
- 2007: Austin Wranglers
- 2008: Dallas Desperados
- 2009: Edmonton Eskimos* *Pre-season only
- * Offseason or practice squad member only
- Stats at CFL.ca

Michael Williams (born February 19, 1984) is an American former professional football defensive end. He was signed by the Austin Wranglers as a street free agent in 2009. He played college football for the Texas College Steers.

Williams was also a member of the Dallas Desperados and Edmonton Eskimos.
