= Pride, Louisiana =

- Unincorporated community
- Location within Louisiana Location within the United States
- Coordinates: 30°41′38″N 90°58′41″W
- Country: United States
- State: Louisiana
- Parish: East Baton Rouge
- Elevation: 108 ft (33 m)
- Time zone: UTC-6 (Central (CST))
  - Summer (DST): UTC-5 (CDT)
- ZIP code: 70770
- Area code: 225
- GNIS feature ID: 543602

Pride is an unincorporated community in East Baton Rouge Parish, Louisiana, United States. Its ZIP code is 70770.

== History ==
A post office was established at Pride in 1886. The origin of Pride's name is unknown.

== Government ==
The U.S. Postal Service operates the Pride Post Office.

== Education ==
East Baton Rouge Parish Public Schools operates public schools:

- Northeast Elementary School
- Northeast Middle School and Northeast High School

=== Library ===
East Baton Rouge Parish Library operates the Pride-Chaneyville Branch Library. The library first opened in 1941. It was initially located in the gymnasium of Pride High School. The next location was a temporary building on the grounds of Northeast Elementary School, 782 square feet (72.7 m^{2}) large, where it moved in 1983. It moved into its current location, a 12,086-square-foot (1,122.8 m^{2}) standalone building across from the elementary school and adjacent to Northeast High School, on December 12, 2005. This building was designed by Robert Coleman & Partners Architects, AIA. The branch reopened in February 2017 due to replacement reasons.

== Notable person ==
- Donna Douglas - actress, born in Pride, known for her role as Elly May Clampett on The Beverly Hillbillies (1962–1971).
