= Joel Dreessen =

American football player (born 1982)

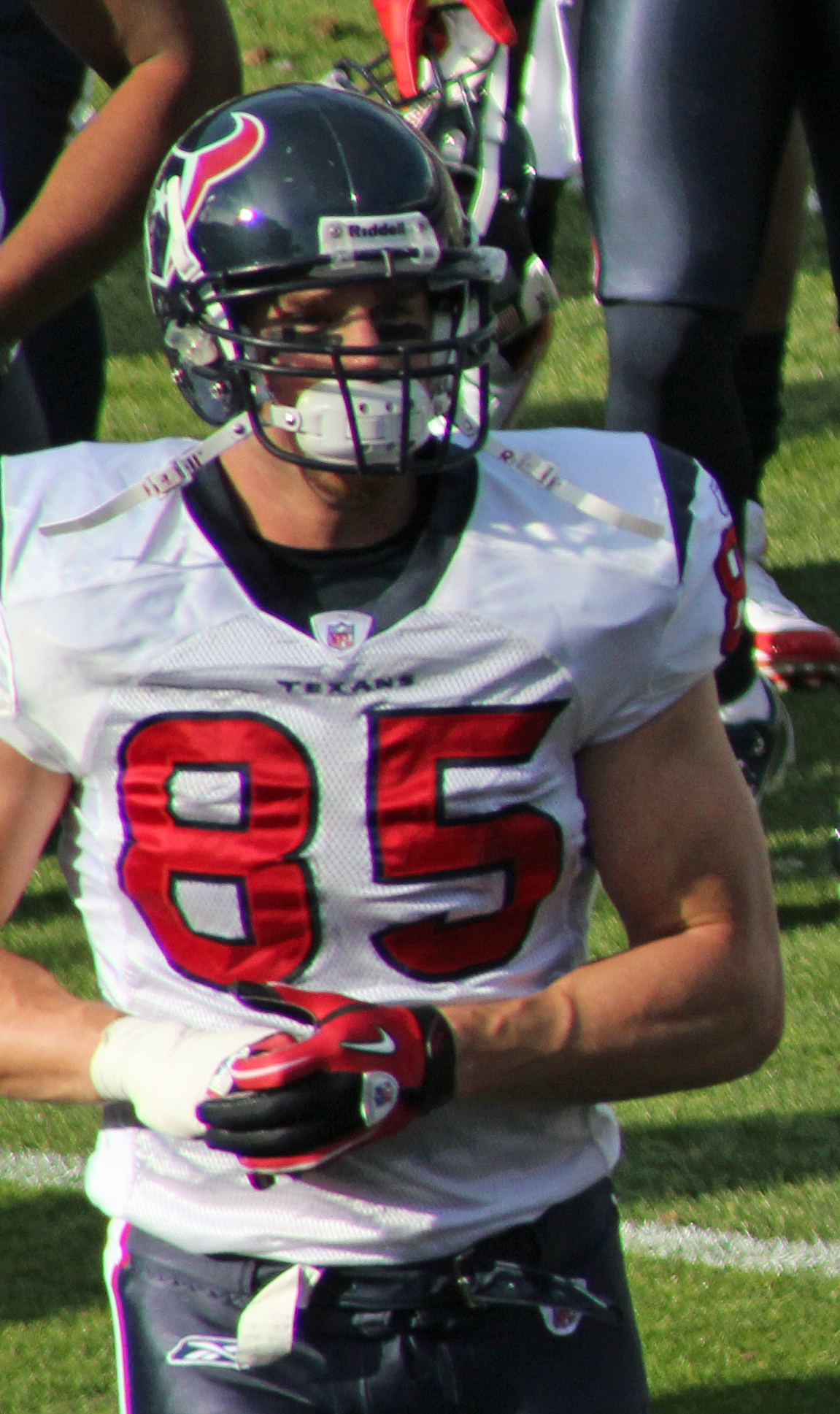
- Dreessen with the Houston Texans in 2010

No. 83, 85, 81
- Position: Tight end

Personal information
- Born: July 26, 1982 (age 44); Ida Grove, Iowa, U.S.
- Listed height: 6 ft 4 in (1.93 m)
- Listed weight: 245 lb (111 kg)

Career information
- High school: Fort Morgan (Fort Morgan, Colorado)
- College: Colorado State (2000–2004)
- NFL draft: 2005: 6th round, 198th overall pick

Career history
- New York Jets (2005); Houston Texans (2007–2011); Denver Broncos (2012–2013)

Awards and highlights
- 2× First-team All-MW (2002, 2004); Second-team All-MW (2003)

Career NFL statistics
- Receptions: 158
- Receiving yards: 1,767
- Receiving touchdowns: 19
- Stats at Pro Football Reference

Joel Clifford Dreessen (born July 26, 1982) is an American former professional football player who was a tight end in the National Football League (NFL). He was selected by the New York Jets in the sixth round of the 2005 NFL draft. He played college football for the Colorado State Rams. Dreessen also played for the Houston Texans and Denver Broncos.

== Early life ==
Dreessen was born in Ida Grove, Iowa, and graduated from Fort Morgan High School in 2000. In 1999, Fort Morgan was the Colorado 3A State champions. Dreessen was also a member of the all-state team in Colorado that year.

Dreessen attended Colorado State University. He earned first-team all-conference honors in 2002 and 2004, second-team all-conference in 2003 and was a participant in the 2004 Senior Bowl. He was inducted into the Colorado State University Athletics Hall of Fame in 2021.

== Professional career ==
Pre-draft measurables
Height	Weight	Arm length	Hand span	40-yard dash	10-yard split	20-yard split	20-yard shuttle	Three-cone drill	Vertical jump	Broad jump	Bench press
6 ft 4 1/4 in (1.94 m)	260 lb (118 kg)	33 3/8 in (0.85 m)	9 1/4 in (0.23 m)	4.81 s	1.73 s	2.82 s	4.01 s	7.09 s	36.0 in (0.91 m)	9 ft 5 in (2.87 m)	22 reps
All values from NFL Combine

=== New York Jets ===
Dreessen was selected by the New York Jets in the sixth round of the 2005 NFL draft. As a rookie, Dreessen appeared in 14 games and had five receptions for 41 yards. He was later cut by the Jets and spent the 2006 season out of football.

=== Houston Texans ===
The Texans signed Dreessen to help with rising injuries on the team. On October 28, 2007, Joel Dreessen caught his first NFL touchdown pass, a 28-yard reception in the fourth quarter from quarterback Sage Rosenfels against the San Diego Chargers at San Diego's Qualcomm Stadium. It was Houston's only touchdown in a 35–10 loss. Dreessen had four receptions for 55 receiving yards and two receiving touchdowns in 13 games on the season.

In the 2008 season, Dreessen finished with 11 receptions for 77 receiving yards in 16 games and three starts.

Dreessen re-signed with the Texans in 2009 for a reported three-year, $3.6 million deal.

Near the end of the 2009 season, Dreessen had become the starter at tight end due to the injury of Owen Daniels. Dreessen caught the first touchdown pass in the Texans' last game against the New England Patriots from Matt Schaub. He finished the 2009 season with 26 receptions for 320 receiving yards and one receiving touchdown in 16 games and 11 starts.

In Week 11 of the 2010 season, Dreessen had four receptions for 106 yards and a touchdown against the New York Jets. In the 2010 season, Dreessen finished with 36 receptions for 518 receiving yards and four receiving touchdowns.

In Week 5 of the 2011 season, Dreessen had five receptions for 112 yards and a touchdown against the Oakland Raiders. In the 2011 season, Dreessen finished with 28 receptions for 353 receiving yards and six receiving touchdowns.

=== Denver Broncos ===
Dreessen signed with the Denver Broncos on March 23, 2012, for three years and $8.5 million. In 2012, he caught 41 receptions for 356 yards as well as five touchdowns while playing in 16 games with 15 starts. Dreesen played in 13 games in the 2013 season, recording seven catches for 47 receiving yards and one touchdown.

Dreessen was released by the Broncos on July 22, 2014, after a failed physical.

== NFL career statistics ==
Legend
**Bold**	Career high

=== Regular season ===
Year	Team	Games		Receiving					
Year	Team	GP	GS	Tgt	Rec	Yds	Avg	Lng	TD
2005	NYJ	14	0	10	5	41	8.2	17	0
2007	HOU	13	0	6	4	55	13.8	28	2
2008	HOU	**16**	3	17	11	77	7.0	13	0
2009	HOU	**16**	11	39	26	320	12.3	25	1
2010	HOU	**16**	10	55	36	**518**	**14.4**	43	4
2011	HOU	**16**	10	39	28	353	12.6	**56**	**6**
2012	DEN	**16**	**15**	**58**	**41**	356	8.7	30	5
2013	DEN	13	0	9	7	47	6.7	14	1
Career		120	49	233	158	1,767	11.2	56	19

=== Playoffs ===
Year	Team	Games		Receiving					
Year	Team	GP	GS	Tgt	Rec	Yds	Avg	Lng	TD
2011	HOU	**2**	0	1	0	0	0.0	0	0
2012	DEN	1	**1**	**8**	**6**	**46**	**7.7**	**11**	0
Career		3	1	9	6	46	7.7	11	0
