= 2011 Houston Texans season =

10th season in franchise history; first playoff appearance

- Owner: Bob McNair
- General manager: Rick Smith
- Head coach: Gary Kubiak
- Offensive coordinator: Rick Dennison
- Defensive coordinator: Wade Phillips
- Home stadium: Reliant Stadium

Results
- Record: 10–6
- Division place: 1st AFC South
- Playoffs: Won Wild Card Playoffs (vs. Bengals) 31–10; Lost Divisional Playoffs (at Ravens) 13–20
- Pro Bowlers: 4: HB Arian Foster; CB Johnathan Joseph; C Chris Myers; DE Antonio Smith

Uniform
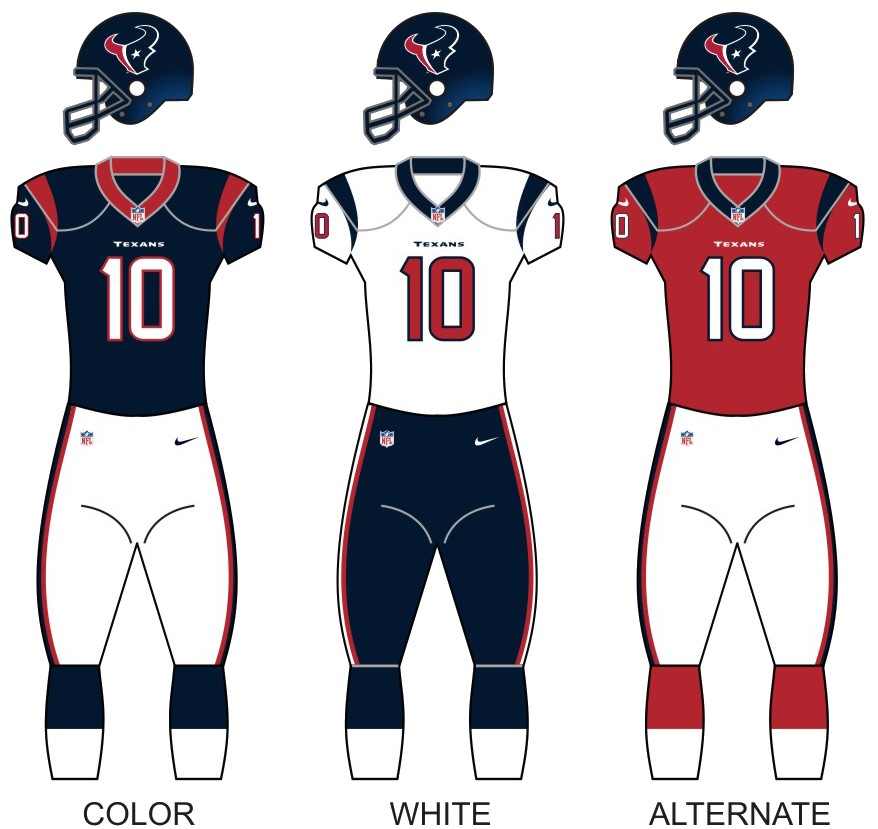

The 2011 season was the Houston Texans' 10th in the National Football League (NFL) and their sixth under head coach Gary Kubiak. The Texans improved on their record from the 2010 season, despite losing starting quarterback Matt Schaub & backup Matt Leinart to season ending injuries. Third stringer T.J. Yates filled in, and earned the franchise's first playoff berth by defeating the Cincinnati Bengals 20–19 in Week 14 and clinching the AFC South. It also assured the Texans of at least one playoff game at home—the first NFL playoff game in Houston since 1993. After reaching the Divisional match against the Baltimore Ravens, the Texans suffered their maiden loss in the NFL Playoffs, losing 20–13.

Prior to the season, former Cowboys head coach Wade Phillips was hired as defensive coordinator, replacing Frank Bush, who was fired. The Texans defense made major improvements in Phillips' first year calling Houston's defensive plays. The team allowed the fourth-fewest points in the league in 2011 (compared to fourth most in 2010), the second-fewest yards allowed (third-most in 2010) and third-fewest yards per play (4.8, compared to 6.0, second-worst in 2010). The Texans allowed just 278 points (17.375 points per game) in the regular season, and scored 103 more points than their opponents did, which are both team records. They allowed 23 or more points only five times all season.

== Offseason ==
=== Draft ===
2011 Houston Texans draft
Round	Pick	Player	Position	College	Notes
1	11	J. J. Watt *	Defensive end	Wisconsin	
2	42	Brooks Reed	Defensive end	Arizona	
2	60	Brandon Harris	Cornerback	Miami (FL)	from New England
4	127	Rashad Carmichael	Cornerback	Virginia Tech	from Chicago via Washington
5	144	Shiloh Keo	Safety	Idaho	from Washington
5	152	T. J. Yates	Quarterback	North Carolina	from Indianapolis via Washington
7	214	Derek Newton	Offensive tackle	Arkansas State	
7	254	Cheta Ozougwu	Defensive end	Rice	Supplemental compensatory selection
Made roster † Pro Football Hall of Fame * Made at least one Pro Bowl during career

== Staff ==
Houston Texans 2011 staff
Front office: Chairman/CEO – Bob McNair; Vice chairman – Philip Burguières; Vice chairman – D. Cal McNair; President – Jamey Rootes; Executive vice president/general manager – Rick Smith; Vice president of football administration – Chris Olsen; Director of pro personnel – Brian Gardner; Associate director of pro personnel – Bobby Grier; Director of college scouting – Mike Maccagnan; Head coaches: Head coach – Gary Kubiak; Assistant head coach/defensive line – Bill Kollar; Offensive coaches: Offensive coordinator – Rick Dennison; Quarterbacks – Greg Knapp; Running backs – Chick Harris; Wide receivers – Larry Kirksey; Tight ends – Brian Pariani; Offensive line – John Benton; Assistant offensive line – Frank Pollack; Offensive assistant – Marc Lubick; Offensive assistant – Jim Ryan	Defensive coaches: Defensive coordinator – Wade Phillips; Linebackers – Reggie Herring; Secondary – Vance Joseph; Assistant defensive backs – Perry Carter; Defensive assistant – Bobby King; Special teams coaches: Special teams – Joe Marciano; Strength and conditioning: Head strength and conditioning – Cedric Smith; Assistant strength and conditioning – Matt Schiotz

== Final roster ==
2011 Houston Texans roster
Quarterbacks (QB): 17 Jake Delhomme; 7 Jeff Garcia; 13 T. J. Yates; Running backs (RB): 23 Arian Foster; 44 Ben Tate; 47 Lawrence Vickers FB; 32 Derrick Ward; Wide receivers (WR): 80 Andre Johnson; 89 Bryant Johnson; 12 Jacoby Jones PR; 15 Jeff Maehl; 83 Kevin Walter; Tight ends (TE): 86 James Casey; 81 Owen Daniels; 85 Joel Dreessen; 88 Garrett Graham	Offensive linemen (OL): 61 Thomas Austin G; 65 Mike Brisiel G; 76 Duane Brown T; 62 Antoine Caldwell G; 66 Andrew Gardner G; 55 Chris Myers C; 75 Derek Newton T; 74 Wade Smith G; 73 Eric Winston T; Defensive linemen (DL): 93 Tim Bulman DE; 95 Shaun Cody NT; 96 Tim Jamison DE; 92 Earl Mitchell NT; 94 Antonio Smith DE; 99 J. J. Watt DE	Linebackers (LB): 54 Mister Alexander ILB; 98 Connor Barwin OLB; 50 Bryan Braman OLB; 56 Brian Cushing ILB; 52 Tim Dobbins ILB; 57 Jesse Nading OLB; 58 Brooks Reed OLB; 59 DeMeco Ryans ILB; Defensive backs (DB): 30 Jason Allen CB; 27 Quintin Demps SS; 26 Brandon Harris CB; 25 Kareem Jackson CB; 24 Johnathan Joseph CB; 31 Shiloh Keo FS; 21 Brice McCain CB; 22 Sherrick McManis CB; 38 Danieal Manning FS; 33 Troy Nolan FS; 29 Glover Quin SS; Special teams (ST): 4 Neil Rackers K; 1 Matt Turk P; 46 Jon Weeks LS	Practice squad: 63 Howard Barbieri G; 91 Ra'Shon Harris NT; 16 Trindon Holliday WR; 19 Juaquin Iglesias WR; 97 Derrell Smith LB; 79 Cody Wallace C; 40 Javarris Williams RB; 42 Torri Williams S; Reserve: 34 Dominique Barber SS (IR); 78 Rashad Butler T (IR); 36 Roc Carmichael CB (IR); 2 Brett Hartmann P (IR); 18 Lestar Jean WR (IR); 11 Matt Leinart QB (IR); 77 Darius Morris T (IR); 8 Matt Schaub QB (IR); 51 Darryl Sharpton ILB (IR); 71 Shelley Smith G (IR); 64 Kasey Studdard G (IR); 90 Mario Williams OLB (IR); Rookies in italics 53 active, 12 reserve, 8 practice squad

== Preseason ==
Week	Date	Opponent	Result	Record	Venue	Recap
1	August 15	New York Jets	W 20–16	1–0	Reliant Stadium	Recap
2	August 20	New Orleans Saints	W 27–14	2–0	Reliant Stadium	Recap
3	August 27	at San Francisco 49ers	W 30–7	3–0	Candlestick Park	Recap
4	September 1	at Minnesota Vikings	L 0–28	3–1	Mall of America Field	Recap

== Regular season ==
=== Schedule ===
Week	Date	Opponent	Result	Record	Venue	Recap
1	September 11	**Indianapolis Colts**	**W** 34–7	1–0	Reliant Stadium	Recap
2	September 18	at Miami Dolphins	**W** 23–13	2–0	Sun Life Stadium	Recap
3	September 25	at New Orleans Saints	**L** 33–40	2–1	Mercedes-Benz Superdome	Recap
4	October 2	Pittsburgh Steelers	**W** 17–10	3–1	Reliant Stadium	Recap
5	October 9	Oakland Raiders	**L** 20–25	3–2	Reliant Stadium	Recap
6	October 16	at Baltimore Ravens	**L** 14–29	3–3	M&T Bank Stadium	Recap
7	October 23	at **Tennessee Titans**	**W** 41–7	4–3	LP Field	Recap
8	October 30	**Jacksonville Jaguars**	**W** 24–14	5–3	Reliant Stadium	Recap
9	November 6	Cleveland Browns	**W** 30–12	6–3	Reliant Stadium	Recap
10	November 13	at Tampa Bay Buccaneers	**W** 37–9	7–3	Raymond James Stadium	Recap
11	Bye					
12	November 27	at **Jacksonville Jaguars**	**W** 20–13	8–3	EverBank Field	Recap
13	December 4	Atlanta Falcons	**W** 17–10	9–3	Reliant Stadium	Recap
14	December 11	at Cincinnati Bengals	**W** 20–19	10–3	Paul Brown Stadium	Recap
15	December 18	Carolina Panthers	**L** 13–28	10–4	Reliant Stadium	Recap
16	December 22	at **Indianapolis Colts**	**L** 16–19	10–5	Lucas Oil Stadium	Recap
17	January 1	**Tennessee Titans**	**L** 22–23	10–6	Reliant Stadium	Recap

Note: Intra-division opponents are in bold text.

=== Game summaries ===
==== Week 1: vs. Indianapolis Colts ====
Week One: Indianapolis Colts at Houston Texans – Game summary

Quarter	1	2	3	4	Total
Colts	0	0	0	7	**7**
**Texans**	17	17	0	0	**34**

at Reliant Stadium, Houston, Texas

- Date: September 11
- Game time: 12:00 p.m. CDT
- Game weather: Played indoors (retractable roof closed)
- Game attendance: 71,444
- Referee: Walt Coleman
- TV announcers (CBS): Greg Gumbel and Dan Dierdorf

Game information

**First quarter**

- HOU – Neil Rackers 25-yard field goal, 4:27. Texans 3–0. **Drive: 13 plays, 73 yards, 6:32.**
- HOU – Derrick Ward 1-yard run (Neil Rackers kick), 2:56. Texans 10–0. **Drive: 2 plays, 5 yards, 0:41.**
- HOU – Ben Tate 2-yard run (Neil Rackers kick), 1:41. Texans 17–0. **Drive: 3 plays, 18 yards, 1:08.**

**Second quarter**

- HOU – Andre Johnson 4-yard pass from Matt Schaub (Neil Rackers kick), 6:57. Texans 24–0. **Drive: 10 plays, 89 yards, 5:54.**
- HOU – Neil Rackers 29-yard field goal, 1:34. Texans 27–0. **Drive: 9 plays, 51 yards, 3:51.**
- HOU – Jacoby Jones 79-yard punt return (Neil Rackers kick), 0:54. Texans 34–0.

**Third quarter**

- No scoring plays

**Fourth quarter**

- IND – Reggie Wayne 6-yard pass from Kerry Collins (Adam Vinatieri kick), 9:17. Texans 34–7. **Drive: 2 plays, 8 yards, 1:10.**

**Top passers**

- IND – Kerry Collins – 16/31, 197 yards, TD
- HOU – Matt Schaub – 17/24, 220 yards, TD, 2 INT

**Top rushers**

- IND – Joseph Addai – 8 rushes, 39 yards
- HOU – Ben Tate – 24 rushes, 116 yards, TD

**Top receivers**

- IND – Reggie Wayne – 7 receptions, 106 yards, TD
- HOU – Andre Johnson – 7 receptions, 95 yards, TD

The Texans began their season at home against the AFC South division foes, Colts. With the win, the Texans started the season out at 1–0.

==== Week 2: at Miami Dolphins ====
Week Two: Houston Texans at Miami Dolphins – Game summary

Quarter	1	2	3	4	Total
**Texans**	6	10	0	7	**23**
Dolphins	3	0	7	3	**13**

at Sun Life Stadium, Miami Gardens, Florida

- Date: September 18
- Game time: 4:15 p.m. EDT/3:15 p.m. CDT
- Game weather: 87 °F (31 °C) (Sunny)
- Game attendance: 51,032
- Referee: John Parry
- TV announcers (CBS): Ian Eagle and Dan Fouts

Game information

**First quarter**

- HOU – Neil Rackers 23-yard field goal, 9:58. Texans 3–0. **Drive: 12 plays, 75 yards, 5:02.**
- HOU – Neil Rackers 22-yard field goal, 4:33. Texans 6–0. **Drive: 8 plays, 40 yards, 4:04.**
- MIA – Dan Carpenter 42-yard field goal, 2:25. Texans 6–3. **Drive: 7 plays, 29 yards, 2:08.**

**Second quarter**

- HOU – Owen Daniels 4-yard pass from Matt Schaub (Neil Rackers kick), 14:09. Texans 13–3. **Drive: 2 plays, 6 yards, 0:44.**
- HOU – Neil Rackers 36-yard field goal, 0:00. Texans 16–3. **Drive: 9 plays, 60 yards, 2:42.**

**Third quarter**

- MIA – Brandon Marshall 12-yard pass from Chad Henne (Dan Carpenter kick), 6:37. Texans 16–10. **Drive: 7 plays, 63 yards, 3:06.**

**Fourth quarter**

- MIA – Dan Carpenter 34-yard field goal, 12:53. Texans 16–13. **Drive: 11 plays, 75 yards, 3:26.**
- HOU – Andre Johnson 23-yard pass from Matt Schaub (Neil Rackers kick), 10:06. Texans 23–13. **Drive: 5 plays, 63 yards, 2:47.**

**Top passers**

- HOU – Matt Schaub – 21/29, 230 yards, 2 TD
- MIA – Chad Henne – 12/30, 170 yards, TD, INT

**Top rushers**

- HOU – Ben Tate – 23 rushes, 103 yards
- MIA – Daniel Thomas – 18 rushes, 107 yards

**Top receivers**

- HOU – Andre Johnson – 7 receptions, 93 yards, TD
- MIA – Brandon Marshall – 6 receptions, 79 yards, TD

The Texans went on the road to face the Dolphins. With the win, the Texans improved to 2–0.

==== Week 3: at New Orleans Saints ====
Week Three: Houston Texans at New Orleans Saints – Game summary

Quarter	1	2	3	4	Total
Texans	10	6	3	14	**33**
**Saints**	0	10	7	23	**40**

at Mercedes-Benz Superdome, New Orleans, Louisiana

- Date: September 25
- Game time: 12:00 p.m. CDT
- Game weather: Played indoors (dome stadium)
- Game attendance: 73,002
- Referee: Tony Corrente
- TV announcers (CBS): Greg Gumbel and Dan Dierdorf

Game information

**First quarter**

- HOU – Owen Daniels 14-yard pass from Matt Schaub (Neil Rackers kick), 10:13. Texans 7–0. **Drive: 9 plays, 92 yards, 4:47.**
- HOU – Neil Rackers 22-yard field goal, 3:17. Texans 10–0. **Drive: 8 plays, 82 yards, 3:43.**

**Second quarter**

- NO – Darren Sproles 30-yard run (John Kasay kick), 8:23. Texans 10–7. **Drive: 8 plays, 86 yards, 4:44.**
- HOU – Neil Rackers 27-yard field goal, 6:20. Texans 13–7. **Drive: 6 plays, 71 yards, 2:03.**
- HOU – Neil Rackers 27-yard field goal, 3:53. Texans 16–7. **Drive: 6 plays, 25 yards, 2:17.**
- NO – John Kasay 35-yard field goal, 0:35. Texans 16–10. **Drive: 7 plays, 62 yards, 3:18.**

**Third quarter**

- NO – Robert Meachem 2-yard pass from Drew Brees (John Kasay kick), 10:34. Saints 17–16. **Drive: 8 plays, 68 yards, 4:26.**
- HOU – Neil Rackers 36-yard field goal, 5:08. Texans 19–17. **Drive: 11 plays, 55 yards, 5:26.**

**Fourth quarter**

- HOU – James Casey 26-yard pass from Matt Schaub (Neil Rackers kick), 14:54. Texans 26–17. **Drive: 4 plays, 42 yards, 2:06.**
- NO – Jimmy Graham 27-yard pass from Drew Brees (John Kasay kick), 9:30. Texans 26–24. **Drive: 5 plays, 49 yards, 1:50.**
- NO – Lance Moore 16-yard pass from Drew Brees (Drew Brees pass to Lance Moore), 7:10. Saints 32–26. **Drive: 6 plays, 47 yards, 1:58.**
- HOU – Kevin Walter 20-yard pass from Matt Schaub (Neil Rackers kick), 4:13. Texans 33–32. **Drive: 9 plays, 80 yards, 2:57.**
- NO – Mark Ingram II 13-yard run (Drew Brees pass to Lance Moore), 2:42. Saints 40–33. **Drive: 8 plays, 70 yards, 1:31.**

**Top passers**

- HOU – Matt Schaub – 22/39, 373 yards, 3 TD, INT
- NO – Drew Brees – 31/44, 370 yards, 3 TD, 2 INT

**Top rushers**

- HOU – Ben Tate – 19 rushes, 82 yards
- NO – Mark Ingram II – 9 rushes, 38 yards, TD

**Top receivers**

- HOU – Andre Johnson – 7 receptions, 128 yards
- NO – Jimmy Graham – 4 receptions, 100 yards, TD

With the loss, the Texans fell to 2–1.

==== Week 4: vs. Pittsburgh Steelers ====
Week Four: Pittsburgh Steelers at Houston Texans – Game summary

Quarter	1	2	3	4	Total
Steelers	0	0	7	3	**10**
**Texans**	7	3	0	7	**17**

at Reliant Stadium, Houston, Texas

- Date: October 2
- Game time: 12:00 p.m. CDT
- Game weather: Played indoors (retractable roof closed)
- Game attendance: 71,585
- Referee: Clete Blakeman
- TV announcers (CBS): Greg Gumbel and Dan Dierdorf

Game information

**First quarter**

- HOU – Owen Daniels 1-yard pass from Matt Schaub (Neil Rackers kick), 4:05. Texans 7–0. **Drive: 19 plays, 82 yards, 10:55.**

**Second quarter**

- HOU – Neil Rackers 25-yard field goal is good, 2:33. Texans 10–0. **Drive: 12 plays, 60 yards, 5:41.**

**Third quarter**

- PIT – Rashard Mendenhall 3-yard run (Shaun Suisham kick), 7:02. Texans 10–7. **Drive: 13 plays, 79 yards, 7:58.**

**Fourth quarter**

- PIT – Shaun Suisham 26-yard field goal is good, 14:57. Tied 10–10. **Drive: 9 plays, 60 yards, 5:27.**
- HOU – Arian Foster 42-yard run (Neil Rackers kick), 12:02. Texans 17–10. **Drive: 5 plays, 85 yards, 2:55.**

**Top passers**

- PIT – Ben Roethlisberger – 16/30, 206 yards, INT
- HOU – Matt Schaub – 14/21, 138 yards, TD

**Top rushers**

- PIT – Isaac Redman – 6 rushes, 40 yards
- HOU – Arian Foster – 30 rushes, 155 yards, TD

**Top receivers**

- PIT – Mike Wallace – 4 receptions, 77 yards
- HOU – Owen Daniels – 5 receptions, 69 yards, TD

With the win, the Texans improved to 3–1.

==== Week 5: vs. Oakland Raiders ====
Week Five: Oakland Raiders at Houston Texans – Game summary

Quarter	1	2	3	4	Total
**Raiders**	3	9	3	10	**25**
Texans	7	7	3	3	**20**

at Reliant Stadium, Houston, Texas

- Date: October 9
- Game time: 12:00 p.m. CDT
- Game weather: Played indoors (retractable roof closed)
- Game attendance: 71,420
- Referee: Pete Morelli
- TV announcers (CBS): Ian Eagle and Dan Fouts

Game information

**First quarter**

- HOU – Kevin Walter 5-yard pass from Matt Schaub (Neil Rackers kick), 8:09. Texans 7–0. **Drive: 10 plays, 65 yards, 4:43.**
- OAK – Sebastian Janikowski 54-yard field goal, 3:26. Texans 7–3. **Drive: 4 plays, -1 yards, 1:20.**

**Second quarter**

- OAK – Sebastian Janikowski 55-yard field goal, 14:55. Texans 7–6. **Drive: 5 plays, 2 yards, 1:53.**
- HOU – Joel Dreessen 56-yard pass from Matt Schaub (Neil Rackers kick), 11:57. Texans 14–6. **Drive: 1 play, 56 yards, 0:08.**
- OAK – Darrius Heyward-Bey 34-yard pass from Jason Campbell (pass failed), 1:09. Texans 14–12. **Drive: 5 plays, 73 yards, 0:51.**

**Third quarter**

- OAK – Sebastian Janikowski 50-yard field goal, 5:12. Raiders 15–14. **Drive: 11 plays, 37 yards, 5:39.**
- HOU – Neil Rackers 54-yard field goal, 1:59. Texans 17–15. **Drive: 7 plays, 54 yards, 3:13.**

**Fourth quarter**

- OAK – Chaz Schilens 18-yard pass from Jason Campbell (Sebastian Janikowski kick), 14:50. Raiders 22–17. **Drive: 6 plays, 61 yards, 2:09.**
- OAK – Sebastian Janikowski 42-yard field goal, 10:00. Raiders 25–17. **Drive: 8 plays, 46 yards, 3:22.**
- HOU – Neil Rackers 40-yard field goal, 2:56. Raiders 25–20. **Drive: 16 plays, 72 yards, 5:26.**

**Top passers**

- OAK – Jason Campbell – 15/35, 190 yards, 2 TD, INT
- HOU – Matt Schaub – 24/51, 416 yards, 2 TD, 2 INT

**Top rushers**

- OAK – Darren McFadden – 16 rushes, 51 yards
- HOU – Arian Foster – 22 rushes, 68 yards

**Top receivers**

- OAK – Darrius Heyward-Bey – 7 receptions, 99 yards, TD
- HOU – Owen Daniels – 7 receptions, 89 yards

The day before the game Al Davis died at the age of 82 due to heart failure. Davis served as the Raiders' head coach from 1963 to 1965, part owner and general manager from 1966 to 1971, then became the team's principal owner in 1972, still serving as general manager. Additionally, Davis served as commissioner of the AFL in 1966. With the loss, the Texans fell to 3–2 and they lost both their second game and first home game against the Raiders.

==== Week 6: at Baltimore Ravens ====
Week Six: Houston Texans at Baltimore Ravens – Game summary

Quarter	1	2	3	4	Total
Texans	0	7	7	0	**14**
**Ravens**	7	3	6	13	**29**

at M&T Bank Stadium, Baltimore, Maryland

- Date: October 16
- Game time: 4:05 p.m. EDT/3:05 p.m. CDT
- Game weather: 72 °F (22 °C) (Partly Cloudy)
- Game attendance: 71,154
- Referee: Gene Steratore
- TV announcers (CBS): Greg Gumbel and Dan Dierdorf

Game information

**First quarter**

- BAL – Joe Flacco 1-yard run (Billy Cundiff kick), 1:08. Ravens 7–0. **Drive: 16 plays, 97 yards, 8:47.**

**Second quarter**

- HOU – Wade Smith fumble recovery in the end zone (Neil Rackers kick), 4:48. Tied 7–7.
- BAL – Billy Cundiff 43-yard Field Goal, 1:50. Ravens 10–7. **Drive: 10 plays, -7 yards, 2:58.**

**Third quarter**

- BAL – Billy Cundiff 48-yard Field Goal, 11:46. Ravens 13–7. **Drive: 7 plays, 48 yards, 3:14.**
- HOU – Jacoby Jones 32-yard pass from Matt Schaub (Neil Rackers kick), 8:36. Texans 14–13. **Drive: 6 plays, 80 yards, 3:10.**
- BAL – Billy Cundiff 25-yard Field Goal, 3:30. Ravens 16–14. **Drive: 8 plays, 79 yards, 5:06.**

**Fourth quarter**

- BAL – Billy Cundiff 33-yard Field Goal, 14:44. Ravens 19–14. **Drive: 5 plays, 51 yards, 1:43.**
- BAL – Ricky Williams 4-yard run (Billy Cundiff kick), 4:01. Ravens 26–14. **Drive: 6 plays, 66 yards, 2:37.**
- BAL – Billy Cundiff 40-yard Field Goal, 1:55. Ravens 29–14. **Drive: 4 plays, 4 yards, 1:39.**

**Top passers**

- HOU – Matt Schaub – 21/37, 220 yards, TD
- BAL – Joe Flacco – 20/33, 305 yards, INT

**Top rushers**

- HOU – Arian Foster – 15 rushes, 49 yards
- BAL – Ray Rice – 23 rushes, 101 yards

**Top receivers**

- HOU – Kevin Walter – 6 receptions, 52 yards
- BAL – Anquan Boldin – 8 receptions, 132 yards

With the loss, the Texans fell to 3–3.

==== Week 7: at Tennessee Titans ====
Week Seven: Houston Texans at Tennessee Titans – Game summary

Quarter	1	2	3	4	Total
**Texans**	3	17	7	14	**41**
Titans	0	0	7	0	**7**

at LP Field, Nashville, Tennessee

- Date: October 23
- Game time: 12:00 p.m. CDT
- Game weather: 72 °F (22 °C) (Sunny)
- Game attendance: 69,143
- Referee: Terry McAulay
- TV announcers (CBS): Marv Albert and Rich Gannon

Game information

**First quarter**

- HOU – Neil Rackers 32-yard field goal, 1:25. Texans 3–0. **Drive: 13 plays, 67 yards, 7:18.**

**Second quarter**

- HOU – Joel Dreessen 10-yard pass from Matt Schaub (Neil Rackers kick), 7:24. Texans 10–0. **Drive: 7 plays, 78 yards, 3:29.**
- HOU – Arian Foster 78-yard pass from Matt Schaub (Neil Rackers kick), 3:53. Texans 17–0. **Drive: 4 plays, 94 yards, 1:48.**
- HOU – Neil Rackers 29-yard field goal, 0:00. Texans 20–0. **Drive: 7 plays, 37 yards, 1:52.**

**Third quarter**

- HOU – Arian Foster 1-yard run (Neil Rackers kick), 9:06. Texans 27–0. **Drive: 7 plays, 92 yards, 3:28.**
- TEN – Jared Cook 5-yard pass from Matt Hasselbeck (Rob Bironas kick), 5:34. Texans 27–7. **Drive: 8 plays, 51 yards, 3:32.**

**Fourth quarter**

- HOU – Arian Foster 5-yard run (Neil Rackers kick), 9:51. Texans 34–7. **Drive: 8 plays, 31 yards, 5:02.**
- HOU – Brice McCain 38-yard interception return (Neil Rackers kick), 9:28. Texans 41–7.

**Top passers**

- HOU – Matt Schaub – 18/23, 296 yards, 2 TD
- TEN – Matt Hasselbeck – 14/30, 104 yards, TD, 2 INT

**Top rushers**

- HOU – Arian Foster – 25 rushes, 115 yards, 2 TD
- TEN – Javon Ringer – 3 rushes, 31 yards

**Top receivers**

- HOU – Arian Foster – 5 receptions, 118 yards
- TEN – Chris Johnson – 6 receptions, 27 yards

With the win, the Texans improved to 4–3.

==== Week 8: vs. Jacksonville Jaguars ====
Battle Red Day

Week Eight: Jacksonville Jaguars at Houston Texans – Game summary

Quarter	1	2	3	4	Total
Jaguars	0	7	0	7	**14**
**Texans**	7	0	7	10	**24**

at Reliant Stadium, Houston, Texas

- Date: October 30
- Game time: 12:00 p.m. CDT
- Game weather: 68 °F (20 °C), sunny (roof open)
- Game attendance: 71,412
- Referee: Scott Green
- TV announcers (CBS): Marv Albert and Rich Gannon

Game information

**First quarter**

- HOU – Matt Schaub 2-yard run (Neil Rackers kick), 8:21. Texans 7–0. **Drive: 12 plays, 80 yards, 6:39.**

**Second quarter**

- JAX – Jason Hill 5-yard pass from Blaine Gabbert (Josh Scobee kick), 5:41. Tied 7–7. **Drive: 2 plays, 8 yards, 0:47.**

**Third quarter**

- HOU – Joel Dreessen 7-yard pass from Matt Schaub (Neil Rackers kick), 9:10. Texans 14–7. **Drive: 9 plays, 44 yards, 4:07.**

**Fourth quarter**

- HOU – Arian Foster 4-yard run (Neil Rackers kick), 12:32. Texans 21–7. **Drive: 5 plays, 40 yards, 4:07.**
- JAX – Maurice Jones-Drew 2-yard run (Josh Scobee kick), 5:15. Texans 21–14. **Drive: 7 plays, 26 yards, 3:58.**
- HOU – Neil Rackers 39-yard field goal, 0:18. Texans 24–14. **Drive: 9 plays, 59 yards, 4:57.**

**Top passers**

- JAX – Blaine Gabbert – 10/30, 97 yards, TD, 2 INT
- HOU – Matt Schaub – 16/30, 225 yards, TD

**Top rushers**

- JAX – Maurice Jones-Drew – 18 rushes, 63 yards, TD
- HOU – Arian Foster – 33 rushes, 112 yards, TD

**Top receivers**

- JAX – Marcedes Lewis – 4 receptions, 45 yards
- HOU – Kevin Walter – 5 receptions, 70 yards

With the win, the Texans improved to 5–3.

==== Week 9: vs. Cleveland Browns ====
Week Nine: Cleveland Browns at Houston Texans – Game summary

Quarter	1	2	3	4	Total
Browns	3	0	3	6	**12**
**Texans**	14	10	3	3	**30**

at Reliant Stadium, Houston, Texas

- Date: November 6
- Game time: 12:00 p.m. CST
- Game weather: Played indoors (retractable roof closed)
- Game attendance: 71,511
- Referee: Alberto Riveron
- TV announcers (CBS): Ian Eagle and Dan Fouts

Game information

**First quarter**

- HOU – Ben Tate 27-yard run (Neil Rackers kick), 9:50. Texans 7–0. **Drive: 9 plays, 82 yards, 5:10.**
- HOU – Matt Schaub 2-yard run (Neil Rackers kick), 7:11. Texans 14–0. **Drive: 6 plays, 21 yards, 2:29.**
- CLE – Phil Dawson 50-yard field goal, 3:43. Texans 14–3. **Drive: 7 plays, 20 yards, 3:28.**

**Second quarter**

- HOU – Arian Foster 19-yard run (Neil Rackers kick), 8:06. Texans 21–3. **Drive: 7 plays, 71 yards, 3:54.**
- HOU – Neil Rackers 28-yard field goal, 0:00. Texans 24–3. **Drive: 1 play, 0 yards, 0:02.**

**Third quarter**

- HOU – Neil Rackers 21-yard field goal, 5:45. Texans 27–3. **Drive: 13 plays, 78 yards, 7:19.**
- CLE – Phil Dawson 51-yard field goal, 2:08. Texans 27–6. **Drive: 8 plays, 35 yards, 3:37.**

**Fourth quarter**

- HOU – Neil Rackers 50-yard field goal, 10:35. Texans 30–6. **Drive: 12 plays, 47 yards, 6:33.**
- CLE – Josh Cribbs 2-yard pass from Colt McCoy (pass failed), 4:47. Texans 30–12. **Drive: 11 plays, 64 yards, 5:48.**

**Top passers**

- CLE – Colt McCoy – 14/22, 146 yards, TD, INT
- HOU – Matt Schaub – 14/23, 119 yards, INT

**Top rushers**

- CLE – Chris Ogbonnaya – 13 rushes, 28 yards
- HOU – Arian Foster – 19 rushes, 124 yards, TD

**Top receivers**

- CLE – Josh Cribbs – 5 receptions, 50 yards, TD
- HOU – Owen Daniels – 3 receptions, 32 yards

With the win, the Texans improved to 6–3.

==== Week 10: at Tampa Bay Buccaneers ====
Week Ten: Houston Texans at Tampa Bay Buccaneers – Game summary

Quarter	1	2	3	4	Total
**Texans**	9	7	14	7	**37**
Buccaneers	0	3	0	6	**9**

at Raymond James Stadium, Tampa, Florida

- Date: November 13
- Game time: 1:00 p.m. EST/12:00 p.m. CST
- Game weather: 77 °F (25 °C) (Partly Cloudy)
- Game attendance: 56,037
- Referee: John Parry
- TV announcers (CBS): Marv Albert and Rich Gannon

Game information

**First quarter**

- HOU – Jacoby Jones 80-yard pass from Matt Schaub (kick blocked), 14:48. Texans 6–0. **Drive: 1 play, 80 yards, 0:12.**
- HOU – Neil Rackers 22-yard field goal, 4:29. Texans 9–0. **Drive: 14 plays, 80 yards, 7:24.**

**Second quarter**

- HOU – Arian Foster 78-yard pass from Matt Schaub (Neil Rackers kick), 8:55. Texans 16–0. **Drive: 3 plays, 85 yards, 1:53.**
- TB – Connor Barth 55-yard field goal, 0:00. Texans 16–3. **Drive: 4 plays, 9 yards, 0:28.**

**Third quarter**

- HOU – Arian Foster 5-yard run (Neil Rackers kick), 8:10. Texans 23–3. **Drive: 7 plays, 65 yards, 4:04.**
- HOU – Derrick Ward 4-yard run (Neil Rackers kick), 2:03. Texans 30–3. **Drive: 7 plays, 39 yards, 3:14.**

**Fourth quarter**

- TB – Preston Parker 9-yard pass from Josh Freeman (pass failed), 11:17. Texans 30–9. **Drive: 9 plays, 68 yards, 3:38.**
- HOU – Ben Tate 11-yard run (Neil Rackers kick), 5:38. Texans 37–9. **Drive: 4 plays, 27 yards, 2:29.**

**Top passers**

- HOU – Matt Schaub – 11/15, 242 yards, 2 TD
- TB – Josh Freeman – 15/33, 170 yards, TD, 3 INT

**Top rushers**

- HOU – Arian Foster – 17 rushes, 84 yards, TD
- TB – LeGarrette Blount – 10 rushes, 34 yards

**Top receivers**

- HOU – Arian Foster – 4 receptions, 102 yards, TD
- TB – Arrelious Benn – 2 receptions, 47 yards

With the win, the Texans went on their bye week 7–3. However, Matt Schaub was lost for the season due to a Lisfranc injury on his right foot.

==== Week 12: at Jacksonville Jaguars ====
Week Twelve: Houston Texans at Jacksonville Jaguars – Game summary

Quarter	1	2	3	4	Total
**Texans**	7	13	0	0	**20**
Jaguars	7	3	0	3	**13**

at EverBank Field, Jacksonville, Florida

- Date: November 27
- Game time: 1:00 p.m. EST/12:00 p.m. CST
- Game weather: 75 °F (24 °C) (10% chance of rain)
- Game attendance: 62,004
- Referee: Walt Coleman
- TV announcers (CBS): Kevin Harlan and Solomon Wilcots

Game information

**First quarter**

- JAX – Ashton Youboty 38-yard fumble return (Josh Scobee kick), 13:38. Jaguars 7–0.
- HOU – Arian Foster 1-yard run (Neil Rackers kick), 6:15. Tied 7–7. **Drive: 8 plays, 67 yards, 3:59.**

**Second quarter**

- JAX – Josh Scobee 21-yard field goal, 10:41. Jaguars 10–7. **Drive: 10 plays, 77 yards, 4:22.**
- HOU – Joel Dreessen 20-yard pass from Matt Leinart (Neil Rackers kick), 6:24. Texans 14–10. **Drive: 2 plays, 26 yards, 0:49.**
- HOU – Neil Rackers 53-yard field goal, 4:13. Texans 17–10. **Drive: 4 plays, -1 yards, 1:37.**
- HOU – Neil Rackers 33-yard field goal, 0:02. Texans 20–10. **Drive: 10 plays, 40 yards, 1:43.**

**Third quarter**

- No scoring plays

**Fourth quarter**

- JAX – Josh Scobee 35-yard field goal, 4:15. Texans 20–13. **Drive: 8 plays, 50 yards, 2:48.**

**Top passers**

- HOU – T. J. Yates – 8/15, 70 yards
- JAX – Blaine Gabbert – 13/29, 136 yards, INT

**Top rushers**

- HOU – Arian Foster – 22 rushes, 65 yards, TD
- JAX – Maurice Jones-Drew – 18 rushes, 99 yards

**Top receivers**

- HOU – Owen Daniels – 4 receptions, 31 yards
- JAX – Maurice Jones-Drew – 4 receptions, 67 yards

With the win, not only did the Texans improved to 8–3, but swept the Jaguars for the 1st time since 2006. With Matt Schaub suffering a lisfranc injury against Tampa Bay, Matt Leinart started at quarterback for the Texans. Leinart would go down against the Jaguars with a collarbone injury, with T. J. Yates stepping in at quarterback. Leinart finished the game going 10-of-13 for 57 yards with a touchdown.

==== Week 13: vs. Atlanta Falcons ====
Week Thirteen: Atlanta Falcons at Houston Texans – Game summary

Quarter	1	2	3	4	Total
Falcons	0	3	7	0	**10**
**Texans**	3	7	0	7	**17**

at Reliant Stadium, Houston, Texas

- Date: December 4
- Game time: 12:00 p.m. CST
- Game weather: Played indoors (retractable roof closed)
- Game attendance: 71,545
- Referee: Bill Leavy
- TV announcers (Fox): Kenny Albert, Daryl Johnston and Tony Siragusa

Game information

**First quarter**

- HOU – Neil Rackers 43-yard field goal, 4:03. Texans 3–0. **Drive: 6 plays, 13 yards, 2:45.**

**Second quarter**

- HOU – Joel Dreessen 3-yard pass from T. J. Yates (Neil Rackers kick), 10:08. Texans 10–0. **Drive: 7 plays, 80 yards, 4:00.**
- ATL – Matt Bryant 19-yard field goal, 5:06. Texans 10–3. **Drive: 10 plays, 79 yards, 5:02.**

**Third quarter**

- ATL – Roddy White 4-yard pass from Matt Ryan (Matt Bryant kick), 1:46. Tied 10–10. **Drive: 7 plays, 56 yards, 2:44.**

**Fourth quarter**

- HOU – Arian Foster 1-yard run (Neil Rackers kick), 6:05. Texans 17–10. **Drive: 19 plays, 85 yards, 10:41.**

**Top passers**

- ATL – Matt Ryan – 20/47, 267 yards, TD, 2 INT
- HOU – T. J. Yates – 12/25, 188 yards, TD

**Top rushers**

- ATL – Michael Turner – 14 rushes, 44 yards
- HOU – Arian Foster – 31 rushes, 111 yards, TD

**Top receivers**

- ATL – Tony Gonzalez – 7 receptions, 100 yards
- HOU – Andre Johnson – 4 receptions, 97 yards

Due to injuries to Matt Schaub and Matt Leinart, quarterback T. J. Yates made his first NFL start. With the win, the Texans improved to 9–3, securing only their second winning season in franchise history.

==== Week 14: at Cincinnati Bengals ====
Week Fourteen: Houston Texans at Cincinnati Bengals – Game summary

Quarter	1	2	3	4	Total
**Texans**	3	0	7	10	**20**
Bengals	6	10	3	0	**19**

at Paul Brown Stadium, Cincinnati, Ohio

- Date: December 11
- Game time: 1:00 p.m. EST/12:00 p.m. CST
- Game weather: 34 °F (1 °C) (Clear)
- Game attendance: 41,202
- Referee: Ed Hochuli
- TV announcers (CBS): Marv Albert and Rich Gannon

Game information

**First quarter**

- HOU – Neil Rackers 46-yard field goal, 9:51. Texans 3–0. **Drive: 7 plays, 59 yards, 3:08.**
- CIN – Mike Nugent 22-yard field goal, 4:45. Tied 3–3. **Drive: 9 plays, 76 yards, 4:57.**
- CIN – Mike Nugent 47-yard field goal, 2:31. Bengals 6–3. **Drive: 4 plays, -4 yards, 0:53.**

**Second quarter**

- CIN – Jerome Simpson 17-yard pass from Andy Dalton (Mike Nugent kick), 3:02. Bengals 13–3. **Drive: 15 plays, 97 yards, 7:45.**
- CIN – Mike Nugent 49-yard field goal, 0:06. Bengals 16–3. **Drive: 4 plays, 32 yards, 0:24.**

**Third quarter**

- HOU – Joel Dreessen 6-yard pass from T. J. Yates (Neil Rackers kick), 12:27. Bengals 16–10. **Drive: 4 plays, 17 yards, 1:52.**
- CIN – Mike Nugent 28-yard field goal, 2:07. Bengals 19–10. **Drive: 12 plays, 88 yards, 6:48.**

**Fourth quarter**

- HOU – Neil Rackers 33-yard field goal, 5:31. Bengals 19–13. **Drive: 13 plays, 88 yards, 6:04.**
- HOU – Kevin Walter 6-yard pass from T. J. Yates (Neil Rackers kick), 0:02. Texans 20–19. **Drive: 13 plays, 80 yards, 2:31.**

**Top passers**

- HOU – T. J. Yates – 26/44, 300 yards, 2 TD, INT
- CIN – Andy Dalton – 16/28, 189 yards, TD

**Top rushers**

- HOU – Ben Tate – 8 rushes, 67 yards
- CIN – Cedric Benson – 21 rushes, 91 yards

**Top receivers**

- HOU – Owen Daniels – 7 receptions, 100 yards
- CIN – A. J. Green – 5 receptions, 59 yards

With the last-second win, the Texans improved to 10–3 and clinched the franchise's first playoff berth and AFC South division title.

==== Week 15: vs. Carolina Panthers ====
Week Fifteen: Carolina Panthers at Houston Texans – Game summary

Quarter	1	2	3	4	Total
**Panthers**	7	14	0	7	**28**
Texans	0	0	6	7	**13**

at Reliant Stadium, Houston, Texas

- Date: December 18
- Game time: 12:00 p.m. CST
- Game weather: Played indoors (retractable roof closed)
- Game attendance: 71,540
- Referee: Jeff Triplette
- TV announcers (Fox): Ron Pitts, Charles Davis and Drea Avent

Game information

**First quarter**

- CAR – Steve Smith Sr. 26-yard pass from Cam Newton (Olindo Mare kick), 12:07. Panthers 7–0. **Drive: 4 plays, 26 yards, 2:09.**

**Second quarter**

- CAR – Jeremy Shockey 9-yard pass from Cam Newton (Olindo Mare kick), 12:19. Panthers 14–0. **Drive: 9 plays, 71 yards, 4:53.**
- CAR – Richie Brockel 7-yard run (Olindo Mare kick), 0:55. Panthers 21–0. **Drive: 9 plays, 53 yards, 5:08.**

**Third quarter**

- HOU – Neil Rackers 26-yard field goal, 11:07. Panthers 21–3. **Drive: 6 plays, 28 yards, 1:47.**
- HOU – Neil Rackers 34-yard field goal, 2:53. Panthers 21–6. **Drive: 12 plays, 89 yards, 5:06.**

**Fourth quarter**

- HOU – Arian Foster 1-yard run (Neil Rackers kick), 13:48. Panthers 21–13. **Drive: 8 plays, 68 yards, 3:37.**
- CAR – DeAngelo Williams 24-yard run (Olindo Mare kick), 9:54. Panthers 28–13. **Drive: 7 plays, 80 yards, 3:54.**

**Top passers**

- CAR – Cam Newton – 13/23, 149 yards, 2 TD
- HOU – T. J. Yates – 19/30, 212 yards, 2 INT

**Top rushers**

- CAR – DeAngelo Williams – 15 rushes, 61 yards, TD
- HOU – Arian Foster – 16 rushes, 109 yards, TD

**Top receivers**

- CAR – Steve Smith Sr. – 5 receptions, 82 yards, TD
- HOU – Arian Foster – 5 receptions, 58 yards

With the loss, the Texans' seven-game winning streak was snapped, falling to 10–4. Houston also lost to the Panthers for the first time in franchise history.

==== Week 16: at Indianapolis Colts ====
Week Sixteen: Houston Texans at Indianapolis Colts – Game summary

Quarter	1	2	3	4	Total
Texans	10	0	3	3	**16**
**Colts**	3	3	3	10	**19**

at Lucas Oil Stadium, Indianapolis, Indiana

- Date: December 22
- Game time: 8:20 p.m. EST/7:20 p.m. CST
- Game weather: Played indoors (retractable roof closed)
- Game attendance: 64,159
- Referee: Jerome Boger
- TV announcers (NFLN^{[a]}): Brad Nessler, Mike Mayock and Alex Flanagan

Game information

**First quarter**

- HOU – Arian Foster 9-yard run (Neil Rackers kick), 14:06. Texans 7–0. **Drive: 2 plays, 17 yards, 0:45.**
- IND – Adam Vinatieri 23-yard field goal, 4:38. Texans 7–3. **Drive: 7 plays, 22 yards, 3:36.**
- HOU – Neil Rackers 44-yard field goal, 2:01. Texans 10–3. **Drive: 6 plays, 54 yards, 2:37.**

**Second quarter**

- IND – Adam Vinatieri 32-yard field goal, 3:36. Texans 10–6. **Drive: 7 plays, 47 yards, 3:39.**

**Third quarter**

- HOU – Neil Rackers 35-yard field goal, 10:25. Texans 13–6. **Drive: 8 plays, 63 yards, 4:35.**
- IND – Adam Vinatieri 47-yard field goal, 0:54. Texans 13–9. **Drive: 12 plays, 51 yards, 5:11.**

**Fourth quarter**

- IND – Adam Vinatieri 31-yard field goal, 6:48. Texans 13–12. **Drive: 11 plays, 63 yards, 6:08.**
- HOU – Neil Rackers 31-yard field goal, 1:56. Texans 16–12. **Drive: 11 plays, 67 yards, 4:52.**
- IND – Reggie Wayne 1-yard pass from Dan Orlovsky (Adam Vinatieri kick), 0:19. Colts 19–16. **Drive: 12 plays, 76 yards, 1:37.**

**Top passers**

- HOU – T. J. Yates – 13/16, 132 yards
- IND – Dan Orlovsky – 23/41, 244 yards, TD

**Top rushers**

- HOU – Arian Foster – 23 rushes, 158 yards, TD
- IND – Joseph Addai – 19 rushes, 53 yards

**Top receivers**

- HOU – Kevin Walter – 3 receptions, 47 yards
- IND – Reggie Wayne – 8 receptions, 106 yards, TD

With the loss, the Texans fell to 10–5.

==== Week 17: vs. Tennessee Titans ====
Week Seventeen: Tennessee Titans at Houston Texans – Game summary

Quarter	1	2	3	4	Total
**Titans**	0	13	3	7	**23**
Texans	7	3	3	9	**22**

at Reliant Stadium, Houston, Texas

- Date: January 1
- Game time: 12:00 p.m. CST
- Game weather: Played indoors (retractable roof closed)
- Game attendance: 71,512
- Referee: Ron Winter
- TV announcers (CBS): Bill Macatee & Steve Tasker

Game information

**First quarter**

- HOU – Ben Tate 4-yard run (Neil Rackers kick), 5:15. Texans 7–0. **Drive: 13 plays, 85 yards, 6:43.**

**Second quarter**

- TEN – Rob Bironas 21-yard field goal, 13:06. Texans 7–3. **Drive: 10 plays, 69 yards, 4:20.**
- TEN – Donnie Avery 1-yard pass from Matt Hasselbeck (Rob Bironas kick), 3:48. Titans 10–7. **Drive: 5 plays, 33 yards, 2:41.**
- HOU – Neil Rackers 52-yard field goal, 1:09. Tied 10–10. **Drive: 7 plays, 46 yards, 2:39.**
- TEN – Rob Bironas 43-yard field goal, 0:05. Titans 13–10. **Drive: 7 plays, 63 yards, 1:09.**

**Third quarter**

- HOU – Neil Rackers 37-yard field goal, 11:46. Tied 13–13. **Drive: 5 plays, 61 yards, 3:14.**
- TEN – Rob Bironas 33-yard field goal, 7:22. Titans 16–13. **Drive: 5 plays, 62 yards, 1:46.**

**Fourth quarter**

- HOU – Neil Rackers 22-yard field goal, 14:57. Tied 16–16. **Drive: 12 plays, 81 yards, 7:25.**
- TEN – Nate Washington 25-yard pass from Matt Hasselbeck (Rob Bironas kick), 4:31. Titans 23–16. **Drive: 6 plays, 56 yards, 2:32.**
- HOU – Bryant Johnson 5-yard pass from Jake Delhomme (run failed), 0:14. Titans 23–22. **Drive: 7 plays, 36 yards, 1:35.**

**Top passers**

- TEN – Matt Hasselbeck – 22/35, 297 yards, 2 TD
- HOU – Jake Delhomme – 18/28, 211 yards, TD

**Top rushers**

- TEN – Chris Johnson – 15 rushes, 61 yards
- HOU – Ben Tate – 16 rushes, 97 yards, TD

**Top receivers**

- TEN – Nate Washington – 4 receptions, 92 yards, TD
- HOU – James Casey – 7 receptions, 91 yards

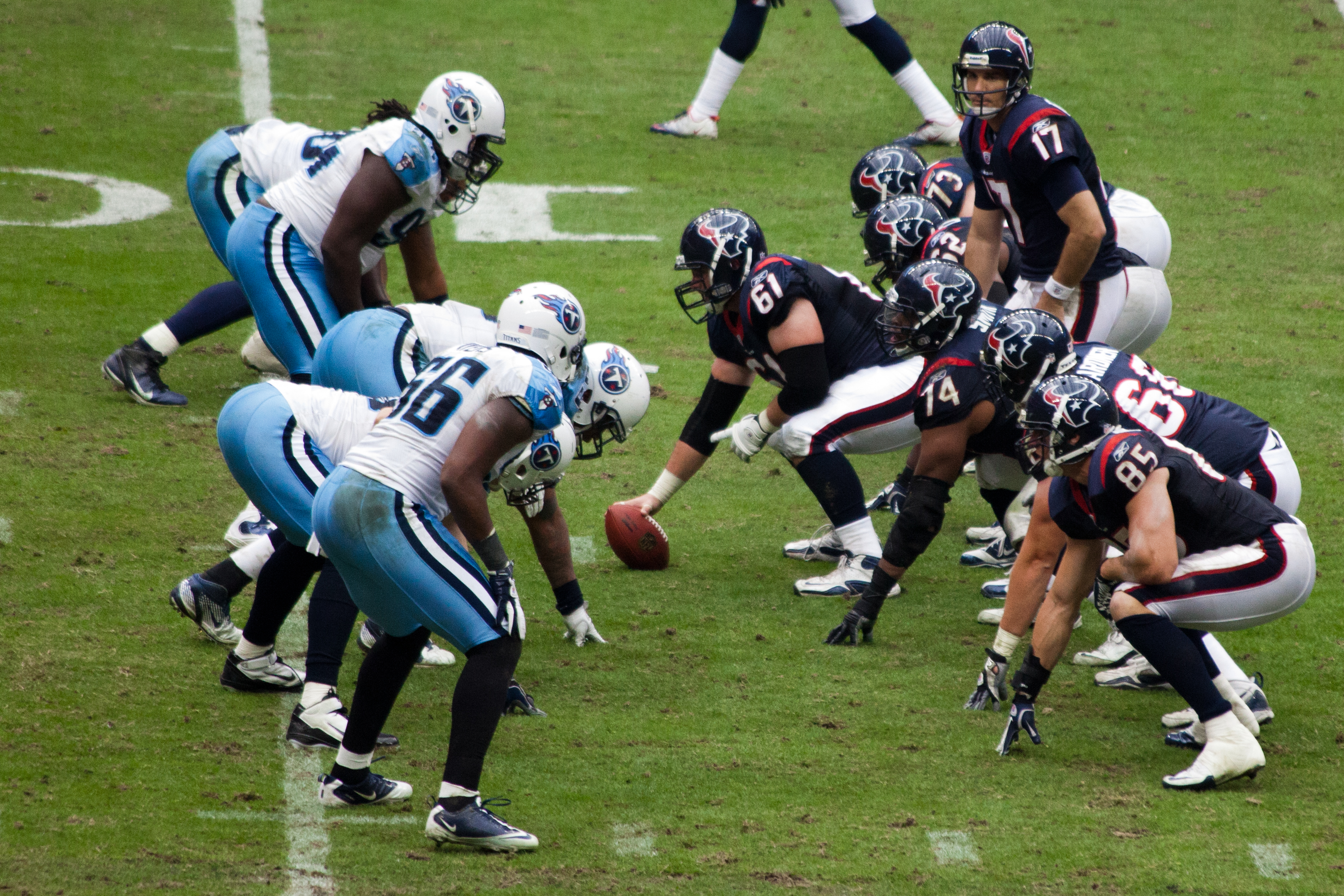
Jake Delhomme and the Texans line up against the Titans

T. J. Yates left the game after the Texans' first offensive drive with a bruised left shoulder. He was replaced by Jake Delhomme for the rest of the game. Houston scored a touchdown with 0:14 left to trail 22–23. To avoid overtime and further injuries, head coach Gary Kubiak decided to try a two-point conversion. Tight end Joel Dreessen was flagged for a false start, moving the Texans back 5 yards. The attempt would ultimately fail as backup center Thomas Austin snapped the ball over Delhomme. Neil Rackers would attempt an onside kick, but it was recovered by Lavelle Hawkins for the Titans, securing a win for Tennessee. With the loss, the Texans would end their season at 10–6 and the AFC's #3 seed.

=== Standings ===
==== Division ====
AFC South
	W	L	T	PCT	DIV	CONF	PF	PA	STK
^{(3)} Houston Texans	10	6	0	.625	4–2	8–4	381	278	L3
Tennessee Titans	9	7	0	.563	3–3	7–5	325	317	W2
Jacksonville Jaguars	5	11	0	.313	3–3	4–8	243	329	W1
Indianapolis Colts	2	14	0	.125	2–4	2–10	243	430	L1

==== Conference ====
AFC
#	Team	Division	W	L	T	PCT	DIV	CONF	SOS	SOV	STK
**Division winners**
1	New England Patriots	East	13	3	0	.813	5–1	10–2	.449	.423	W8
2 (Note: Baltimore clinched the AFC North title based on a head-to-head sweep over Pittsburgh.)	Baltimore Ravens	North	12	4	0	.750	6–0	9–3	.477	.484	W2
3	Houston Texans	South	10	6	0	.625	4–2	8–4	.453	.413	L3
4 (Note: Denver clinched the AFC West title instead of San Diego or Oakland based on common record (5–5 to San Diego's and Oakland's 4–6).)	Denver Broncos	West	8	8	0	.500	3–3	6–6	.520	.445	L3
**Wild cards**
5	Pittsburgh Steelers	North	12	4	0	.750	4–2	9–3	.492	.411	W2
6 (Note: Cincinnati clinched the AFC 6 seed instead of Tennessee based on a head-to-head victory.)	Cincinnati Bengals	North	9	7	0	.563	2–4	6–6	.492	.326	L1
**Did not qualify for the postseason**
7	Tennessee Titans	South	9	7	0	.563	3–3	7–5	.461	.396	W2
8 (Note: New York Jets finished ahead of San Diego based on head-to-head victory.)	New York Jets	East	8	8	0	.500	3–3	6–6	.500	.395	L3
9 (Note: San Diego finished ahead of Oakland in the AFC West based on conference record (7–5 to 6–6).)	San Diego Chargers	West	8	8	0	.500	3–3	7–5	.516	.430	W1
10	Oakland Raiders	West	8	8	0	.500	3–3	6–6	.504	.438	L1
11	Kansas City Chiefs	West	7	9	0	.438	3–3	4–8	.512	.464	W1
12 (Note: Miami finished ahead of Buffalo based on head-to-head sweep.)	Miami Dolphins	East	6	10	0	.375	3–3	5–7	.504	.417	W1
13	Buffalo Bills	East	6	10	0	.375	1–5	4–8	.520	.510	L1
14	Jacksonville Jaguars	South	5	11	0	.313	3–3	4–8	.500	.363	W1
15	Cleveland Browns	North	4	12	0	.250	0–6	3–9	.531	.313	L6
16	Indianapolis Colts	South	2	14	0	.125	2–4	2–10	.539	.594	L1
**Tiebreakers** (Note: When breaking ties for three or more teams under the NFL's rules, they are first broken within divisions, then comparing only the highest ranked remaining team from each division.)

== Postseason ==
=== Schedule ===
Round	Date	Opponent (seed)	Result	Record	Venue	Recap
Wild Card	January 7, 2012	Cincinnati Bengals (6)	W 31–10	1–0	Reliant Stadium	Recap
Divisional	January 15, 2012	at Baltimore Ravens (2)	L 13–20	1–1	M&T Bank Stadium	Recap

=== Game summaries ===
==== AFC Wild Card Playoffs: vs. (6) Cincinnati Bengals ====
AFC Wild Card Playoffs: (6) Cincinnati Bengals at (3) Houston Texans – Game summary

Quarter	1	2	3	4	Total
Bengals	7	3	0	0	10
Texans	7	10	7	7	31

at Reliant Stadium, Houston, Texas

- Date: January 7, 2012
- Game time: 3:30 p.m. CST
- Game weather: Played indoors (retractable roof closed)
- Game attendance: 71,725
- Referee: Clete Blakeman
- TV announcers (NBC): Tom Hammond, Mike Mayock and Alex Flanagan

Game information

First quarter

- CIN – Cedric Benson 1-yard run (Mike Nugent kick), 7:38. Bengals 7–0. Drive: 5 plays, 74 yards, 2:23.
- HOU – Arian Foster 8-yard run (Neil Rackers kick), 4:57. Tied 7–7. Drive: 6 plays, 80 yards, 2:37.

Second quarter

- CIN – Mike Nugent 37-yard field goal, 7:09. Bengals 10–7. Drive: 8 plays, 61 yards, 4:15
- HOU – Neil Rackers 39-yard field goal, 1:53. Tied 10–10. Drive 13 plays, 59 yards, 5:21.
- HOU – J. J. Watt 29-yard interception return (Neil Rackers kick), 0:59. Texans 17–10.

Third quarter

- HOU – Andre Johnson 40-yard pass from T.J. Yates (Neil Rackers kick), 1:18. Texans 24–10. Drive: 9 plays, 83 yards, 4:37

Fourth quarter

- HOU – Arian Foster 42-yard run (Neil Rackers kick), 5:26. Texans 31–10. Drive: 3 plays, 45 yards, 1:46.

Top passers

- CIN – Andy Dalton – 27/42, 257 yards, 3 INT
- HOU – T. J. Yates – 11/20, 159 yards, TD

Top rushers

- CIN – Brian Leonard – 3 rushes, 34 yards
- HOU – Arian Foster – 24 rushes, 153 yards, 2 TD

Top receivers

- CIN – A. J. Green – 5 receptions, 47 yards
- HOU – Andre Johnson – 5 receptions, 90 yards, TD

Making their NFL postseason debut as the AFC's #3 seed, the Texans began their playoff run at home in the AFC Wild Card Round against the #6 Cincinnati Bengals, in a rematch of their Week 14 contest. Not only was this the Texans' first postseason game, it was the franchise's first game ever broadcast nationally on NBC, they were also the last NFL team to finally play on NBC, since their 2002 inception.

Houston trailed in the first quarter with Bengals running back Cedric Benson getting a 1-yard touchdown run, yet the Texans answered with an 8-yard touchdown run from running back Arian Foster. Cincinnati struck back in the second quarter with kicker Mike Nugent getting a 37-yard field goal, but Houston took the lead with a 39-yard field goal from kicker Neil Rackers, followed by rookie defensive end J.J. Watt returning an interception 29 yards for a touchdown. From there, the Texans took control with rookie quarterback T.J. Yates finding wide receiver Andre Johnson on a 40-yard touchdown in the third quarter, followed by a 42-yard touchdown run by Foster in the fourth quarter.

With the win, the Texans improved their overall record to 11–6.

==== AFC Divisional Playoffs: at (2) Baltimore Ravens ====
AFC Divisional Playoffs: (3) Houston Texans at (2) Baltimore Ravens – Game summary

Quarter	1	2	3	4	Total
Texans	3	10	0	0	13
Ravens	17	0	0	3	20

at M&T Bank Stadium, Baltimore, Maryland

- Date: January 15, 2012
- Game time: 1:00 p.m. EST/12:00 p.m. CST
- Game weather: 31 °F (−1 °C), Sunny
- Referee: Pete Morelli
- TV announcers (CBS): Greg Gumbel and Dan Dierdorf

Game information

First quarter

- HOU – Neil Rackers 40-yard field goal, 12:24. Texans 3–0. Drive: 5 plays, 20 yards, 2:36
- BAL – Kris Wilson 1-yard pass from Joe Flacco (Billy Cundiff kick), 9:51. Ravens 7–3. Drive: 3 plays, 2 yards, 1:21
- BAL – Billy Cundiff 48-yard field goal, 6:02. Ravens 10–3. Drive: 6 plays, 30 yards, 2:47
- BAL – Anquan Boldin 10-yard pass from Joe Flacco (Billy Cundiff kick), 1:08. Ravens 17–3. Drive: 5 plays, 34 yards, 2:05

Second quarter

- HOU – Neil Rackers 33-yard field goal, 11:42. Ravens 17–6. Drive: 11 plays, 59 yards, 4:26
- HOU – Arian Foster 1-yard run (Neil Rackers kick), 4:48. Ravens 17–13. Drive: 12 plays, 86 yards, 5:49

Third quarter

- No scoring plays

Fourth quarter

- BAL – Billy Cundiff 44-yard field goal, 2:52. Ravens 20–13. Drive: 10 plays, 45 yards, 4:29

Top passers

- HOU – T. J. Yates – 17/35, 184 yards, 3 INT
- BAL – Joe Flacco – 14/27, 176 yards, 2 TD

Top rushers

- HOU – Arian Foster – 27 rushes, 132 yards, TD, FUM
- BAL – Ray Rice – 21 rushes, 60 yards, FUM

Top receivers

- HOU – Andre Johnson – 8 rec, 111 yards
- BAL – Anquan Boldin – 4 rec, 73 yards, TD

With the loss, the Texans finished the season with an overall record of 11–7.

As of 2025, this was the closest Houston ever got to winning a game in the Divisional Round.

== Statistics ==
=== Team ===
Category	Total yards	Yards per game	NFL rank (out of 32)
Passing offense	3,506	219.1	18th
Rushing offense	2,448	153.0	2nd
Total offense	5,954	372.1	13th
Passing defense	3,035	189.7	3rd
Rushing defense	1,536	96.0	4th
Total defense	4,571	285.7	2nd

=== Individual ===
Category	Player	Total
Offense
Passing yards	Matt Schaub	2,479
Passing touchdowns	Matt Schaub	15
Rushing yards	Arian Foster	1,224
Rushing touchdowns	Arian Foster	10
Receiving yards	Owen Daniels	677
Receiving touchdowns	Joel Dreessen	6
Defense
Tackles (Solo)	Brian Cushing	76
Sacks	Connor Barwin	11.5
Interceptions	Jason Allen; Johnathan Joseph	4
