= Brooks Reed =

American football player (born 1987)

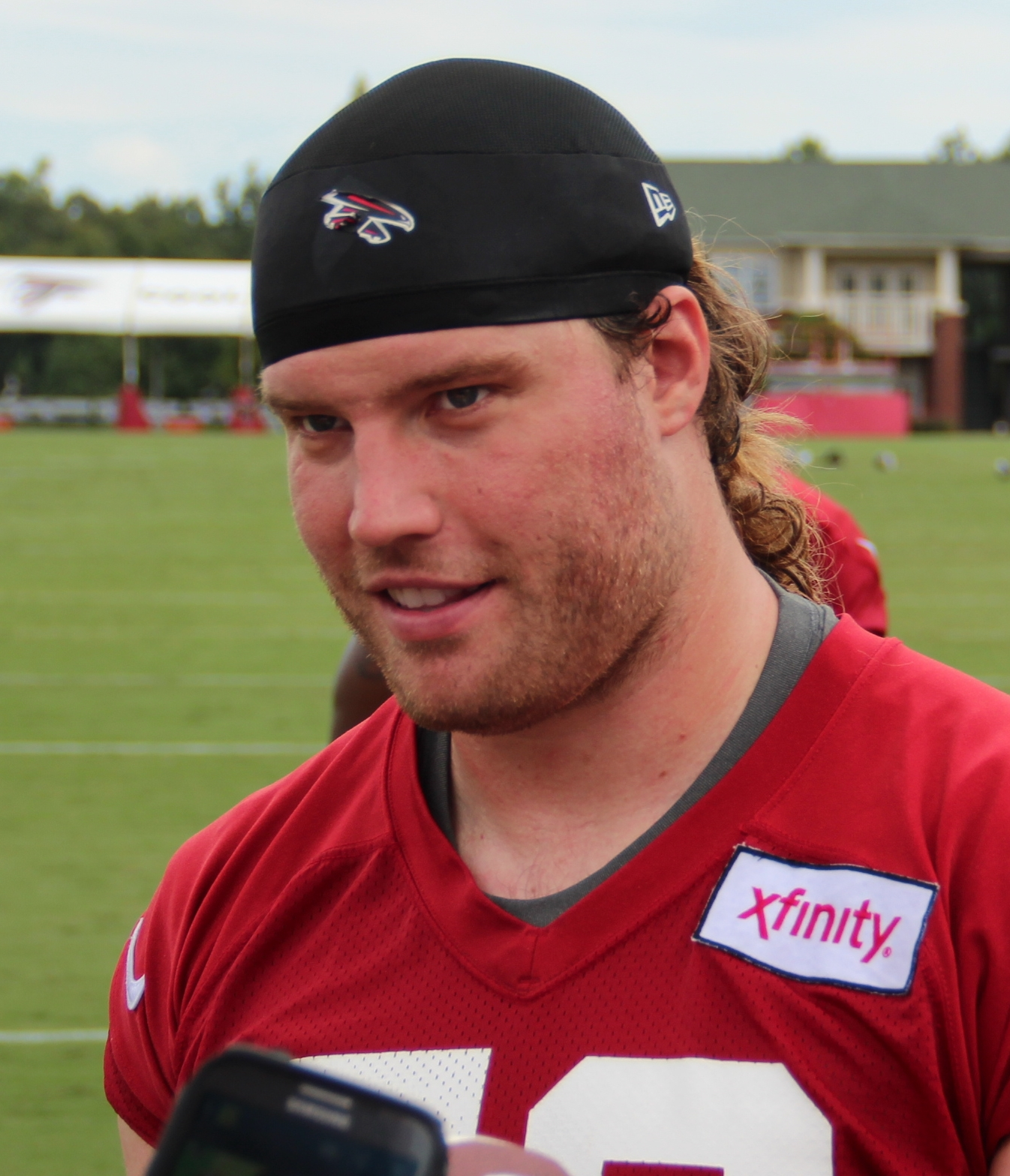
- Reed with the Atlanta Falcons in 2015

No. 58, 56, 50, 42
- Position: Linebacker

Personal information
- Born: February 28, 1987 (age 39); Tucson, Arizona, U.S.
- Listed height: 6 ft 3 in (1.91 m)
- Listed weight: 254 lb (115 kg)

Career information
- High school: Sabino (Tucson)
- College: Arizona (2007–2010)
- NFL draft: 2011: 2nd round, 42nd overall pick

Career history
- Houston Texans (2011–2014); Atlanta Falcons (2015–2018); Arizona Cardinals (2019); Tennessee Titans (2020)

Awards and highlights
- First-team All-Pac-10 (2010)

Career NFL statistics
- Total tackles: 288
- Sacks: 23.5
- Forced fumbles: 4
- Fumble recoveries: 2
- Interceptions: 1
- Stats at Pro Football Reference

Brooks Reed (born February 28, 1987) is an American former professional football player who was a linebacker in the National Football League (NFL). He played college football for the Arizona Wildcats and was selected by the Houston Texans in the second round of the 2011 NFL draft.

== Early life ==
Reed was born in Tucson, Arizona. He attended Sabino High School in Tucson, where he was a running back and defensive lineman for the Sabino Sabercats high school football team. He rushed for 350 yards with seven touchdowns as a junior, earning first-team All-league and honorable mention All-state. As a senior in 2006, he was recognized as a first-team All-state selection and a SuperPrep high school All-American at running back, and received first-team All-state honors as a defensive lineman from the Tucson Citizen after compiling 38 tackles and three sacks. He also starred in track & field, posting bests of 11.75 seconds in the 100 meters and 24.08 seconds in the 200 meters. After his senior year, Brooks was ranked the 9th best fullback in the country by Yahoo/Rivals Sports.

== College career ==
During his college career at the University of Arizona, Reed was credited with 87 tackles and 15 sacks. In 2010, Reed was named to the Pac-10 All-Conference squad as a member of the first-team, and was elected team captain by his teammates.

In 2011, Brooks was awarded the "Tom Hansen" medal, given to the best athlete and student in the then Pac-10.

In August 2021, it was announced that Reed will be into the University of Arizona Ring of Honor during the 2021 season.

== Professional career ==
Pre-draft measurables
Height	Weight	Arm length	Hand span	Wingspan	40-yard dash	10-yard split	20-yard split	20-yard shuttle	Three-cone drill	Vertical jump	Broad jump	Bench press
6 ft 2 1/2 in (1.89 m)	263 lb (119 kg)	32 1/4 in (0.82 m)	10 in (0.25 m)	6 ft 6 3/8 in (1.99 m)	4.66 s	1.63 s	2.70 s	4.28 s	7.11 s	30.5 in (0.77 m)	9 ft 5 in (2.87 m)	30 reps
All values from NFL Combine

=== Houston Texans ===
The Houston Texans selected Reed in the second round (42nd overall pick) in the 2011 NFL draft. The Texans named him to the starting line-up in the sixth week of his first season, following an injury to starting linebacker Mario Williams. In his first start, Reed recorded six tackles. In his second game as a starter, Brooks recorded his first NFL quarterback sack against the Tennessee Titans on October 23, 2011.

=== Atlanta Falcons ===
Reed signed a five-year, $22 million contract with the Atlanta Falcons on March 10, 2015.

In the 2016 season, Reed and the Falcons reached Super Bowl LI, where they faced the New England Patriots. In the Super Bowl, Reed had three total tackles as the Falcons fell in a 34–28 overtime defeat.

On September 10, 2017, against the Chicago Bears in the season opener, Reed had two sacks in the 23–17 victory, and one of them was a crucial fourth down sack on the Bears' final drive. He finished the season with 41 combined tackles and four sacks through 16 games and 14 starts.

In 2018, Reed played in 16 games with eight starts, recording 24 combined tackles, one sack, and a forced fumble.

On February 6, 2019, Reed was released by the Falcons.

=== Arizona Cardinals ===
On February 9, 2019, Reed signed a one-year, $1.625 million contract with the Arizona Cardinals. On November 8, 2019, Reed was placed on injured reserve with a hamstring injury.

=== Tennessee Titans ===
On November 28, 2020, Reed was signed to the Tennessee Titans' practice squad. He was elevated to the active roster on December 19, December 26, and January 2, 2021, for the team's weeks 15, 16, and 17 games against the Detroit Lions, Green Bay Packers, and Houston Texans, and reverted to the practice squad after each game. He was elevated again on January 9, 2021, for the team's wild card playoff game against the Baltimore Ravens, and reverted to the practice squad again following the game. His practice squad contract with the team expired after the season on January 18, 2021.

== NFL career statistics ==
Legend
**Bold**	Career high

=== Regular season ===
Year	Team	Games		Tackles					Interceptions					Fumbles			
Year	Team	GP	GS	Cmb	Solo	Ast	Sck	TFL	Int	Yds	TD	Lng	PD	FF	FR	Yds	TD
2011	HOU	**16**	11	45	31	14	**6.0**	7	0	0	0	0	3	**1**	**2**	0	0
2012	HOU	12	12	27	19	8	2.5	4	0	0	0	0	3	**1**	0	0	0
2013	HOU	**16**	**16**	**56**	**43**	13	3.0	**9**	0	0	0	0	0	0	0	0	0
2014	HOU	**16**	13	41	25	16	3.0	5	**1**	**5**	0	**5**	**4**	0	0	0	0
2015	ATL	13	5	17	10	7	0.0	2	0	0	0	0	0	0	0	0	0
2016	ATL	15	7	25	17	8	2.0	2	0	0	0	0	1	**1**	0	0	0
2017	ATL	**16**	14	41	23	**18**	4.0	6	0	0	0	0	0	0	0	0	0
2018	ATL	**16**	8	24	16	8	1.0	0	0	0	0	0	0	**1**	0	0	0
2019	ARI	9	0	8	4	4	1.0	1	0	0	0	0	0	0	0	0	0
2020	TEN	2	1	4	3	1	1.0	1	0	0	0	0	0	0	0	0	0
		131	87	288	191	97	23.5	37	1	5	0	5	11	4	2	0	0

=== Playoffs ===
Year	Team	Games		Tackles					Interceptions					Fumbles			
Year	Team	GP	GS	Cmb	Solo	Ast	Sck	TFL	Int	Yds	TD	Lng	PD	FF	FR	Yds	TD
2011	HOU	2	**2**	**13**	**9**	**4**	**3.5**	**2**	0	0	0	0	0	**1**	0	0	0
2012	HOU	2	**2**	6	4	2	1.5	0	0	0	0	0	0	0	0	0	0
2016	ATL	**3**	1	7	6	1	1.0	**2**	0	0	0	0	0	0	0	0	0
2017	ATL	2	0	3	3	0	0.0	0	0	0	0	0	0	0	0	0	0
2020	TEN	1	0	1	1	0	1.0	1	0	0	0	0	0	0	0	0	0
		10	5	30	23	7	7.0	5	0	0	0	0	0	1	0	0	0
