= Ryan Jensen (American football) =

American football player (born 1991)

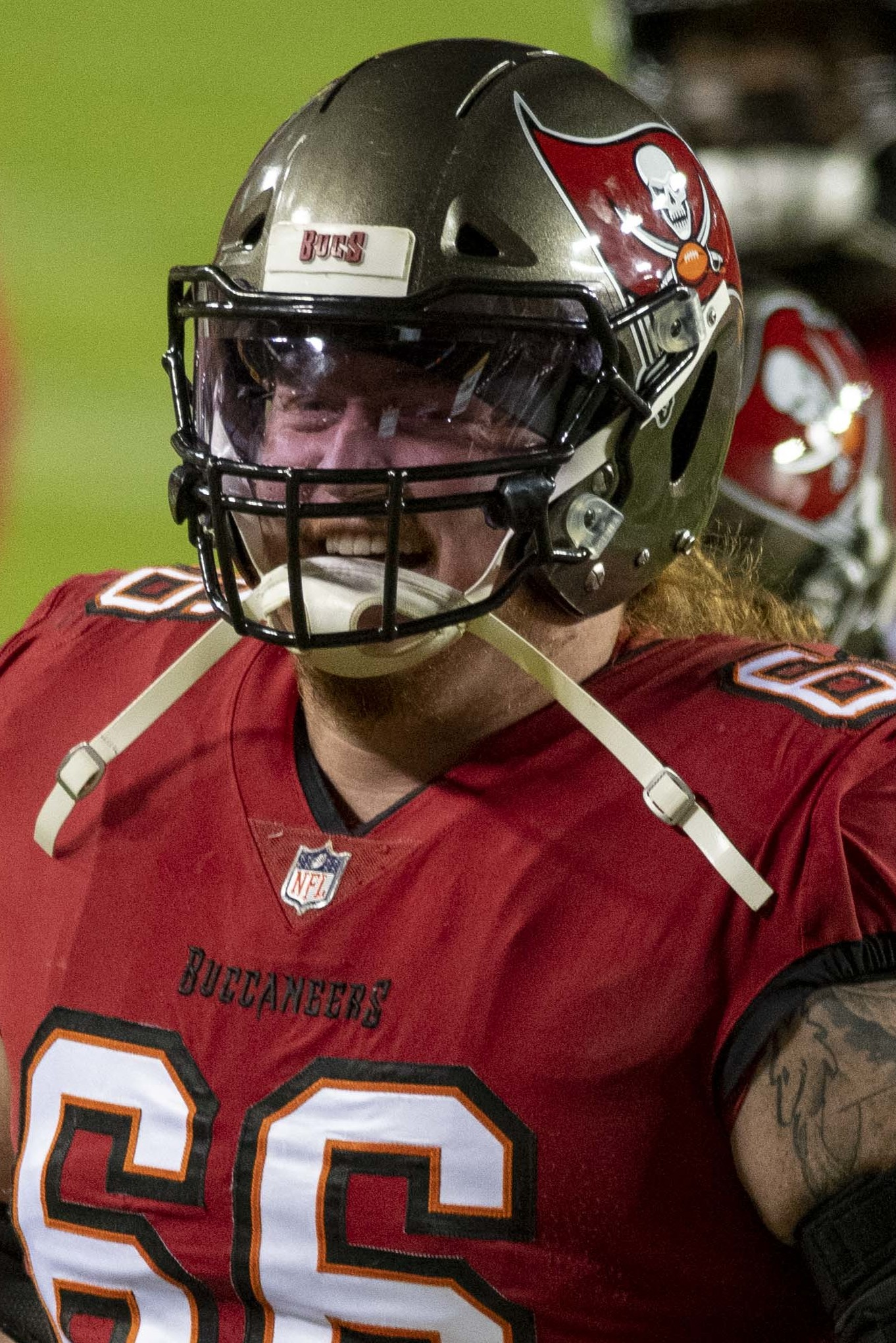
- Jensen with the Tampa Bay Buccaneers in 2021

No. 77, 66
- Position: Center

Personal information
- Born: May 27, 1991 (age 35); Rangely, Colorado, U.S.
- Listed height: 6 ft 4 in (1.93 m)
- Listed weight: 319 lb (145 kg)

Career information
- High school: Fort Morgan (Fort Morgan, Colorado)
- College: CSU Pueblo (2009–2012)
- NFL draft: 2013: 6th round, 203rd overall pick

Career history
- Baltimore Ravens (2013–2017); Tampa Bay Buccaneers (2018–2023)

Awards and highlights
- Super Bowl champion (LV); Pro Bowl (2021); Second-team All-RMAC (2010)

Career NFL statistics
- Games played: 100
- Games started: 90
- Fumble recoveries: 5
- Stats at Pro Football Reference

Ryan Jensen (born May 27, 1991) is an American former professional football player who was a center for nine seasons in the National Football League (NFL). He played college football for the CSU Pueblo ThunderWolves and was selected by the Baltimore Ravens in the sixth round of the 2013 NFL draft. He also spent six seasons with the Tampa Bay Buccaneers, where he won Super Bowl LV.

== Early life ==
Jensen was born in Rangely, Colorado, and attended Fort Morgan High School. He was selected to the All-State first-team while in high school. He also was named to the all-conference.

== College career ==
Jensen attended Colorado State University Pueblo.

In his sophomore season, he was selected to the all-Rocky Mountain Athletic Conference second-team along with being selected to the all-Colorado second-team by the National Football Foundation.

He was a Gene Upshaw Award finalist in his senior year with the CSU Pueblo ThunderWolves and finished fifth in the voting.

Jensen was also selected to participate in the 2013 Texas vs the Nation all-star game following his senior season.

== Professional career ==
Pre-draft measurables
Height	Weight	Arm length	Hand span	40-yard dash	10-yard split	20-yard split	20-yard shuttle	Three-cone drill	Vertical jump	Broad jump	Bench press
6 ft 3 1/2 in (1.92 m)	317 lb (144 kg)	32 1/2 in (0.83 m)	9 1/8 in (0.23 m)	5.23 s	1.85 s	3.03 s	4.56 s	7.69 s	25.5 in (0.65 m)	8 ft 2 in (2.49 m)	30 reps
All values from Pro Day

=== Baltimore Ravens ===
Jensen was selected by the Baltimore Ravens in the sixth round with the 203rd overall pick in the 2013 NFL draft.

On August 30, 2014, Jensen was released by the Ravens and was signed to the practice squad the next day. He was promoted to the active roster on December 16, 2014.

Around the time, he was diagnosed with a severe sleep apnea after experiencing weight loss, fatigue, and a loss of strength. After his diagnosis, he started using a CPAP machine and stated that his weight went up and that he regained strength.

Jensen became a full-time starter for the Ravens in 2017, starting in all 16 games at center.

=== Tampa Bay Buccaneers ===
On March 19, 2018, Jensen signed a four-year, $42 million contract with the Tampa Bay Buccaneers with $22 million guaranteed, making him the highest paid center in the NFL, as Ali Marpet moved from center to left guard to accommodate him. He was the Buccaneers' center in their Super Bowl LV victory on February 7, 2021. Jensen was among the three Buccaneers offensive linemen (joining Marpet and Tristan Wirfs) to be named to the 2022 Pro Bowl roster, a first for all three.

On March 14, 2022, Jensen signed a three-year, $39 million contract extension with the Buccaneers. On July 28, 2022, Jensen experienced a severe knee injury during Buccaneers training camp and had to be carted off the field. He was placed on injured reserve on September 1, 2022. He was activated for the wild card round of the playoffs on January 16, 2023.

On August 29, 2023, Jensen was placed on injured reserve after aggravating his previous knee injury. On February 2, 2024, Jensen announced his retirement from professional football.
