= Fort Morgan High School =

Public high school in Fort Morgan, Colorado, United States

Coordinates: 40.2619°N 103.7932°W

Location
- 709 E Riverview Ave; Fort Morgan, Colorado 80701; United States

Information
- School type: Public
- Motto: "Our goal is to strive to become the best high school in the state."
- Established: c. 1920s
- School district: Morgan County School District Re-3
- NCES District ID: 0804050
- Superintendent: Rob Sanders
- CEEB code: 060610
- NCES School ID: 080405000557
- Principal: Clint Anderson
- Teaching staff: 54.56 (FTE)
- Grades: 9–12
- Enrollment: 1,006 (2025–26)
- Student to teacher ratio: 16.68
- Athletics conference: 3A, 4A
- Mascot: Mustang
- Website: highschool.fortmorgank12.com

Fort Morgan High School is a public high school located in Fort Morgan, Colorado, United States, in Morgan County. It is one of two public high school's located in the town along with Lincoln High School.

== History ==
The school was established in the 1920s. In 1931, robbers broke into the principal's office and stole $50 worth of student funds. In 1965, a new school building was constructed to replace the old one, which became a middle school. In 2000, the school was closed for four months after an asbestos cleanup went awry.

The school football team were state champions in 1911, 1952, 1999, and 2021.

== Student demographics ==
The demographic breakdown of the 879 students enrolled for the 2020–21 school year was:

- American Indian - 0.46%
- Asian - 0.57%
- Black - 5.7%
- Hispanic - 63.5%
- White - 29%
- Biracial - 0.8%

The demographic breakdown for student by gender was 464 male students and 415 female students.

== Notable people ==
=== Faculty ===
- Don Welch — poet

=== Alumni ===
- Glenn Miller — big bandleader
- Lola Spradley — first female speaker of the Colorado House of Representatives
- Trey McBride — American football player
- Stan Matsunaka — American politician
- Brenton Metzler — television producer
- Ryan Jensen — American football player
- Joel Dreessen — American football player
