= Shiloh Keo =

American football player (born 1987)

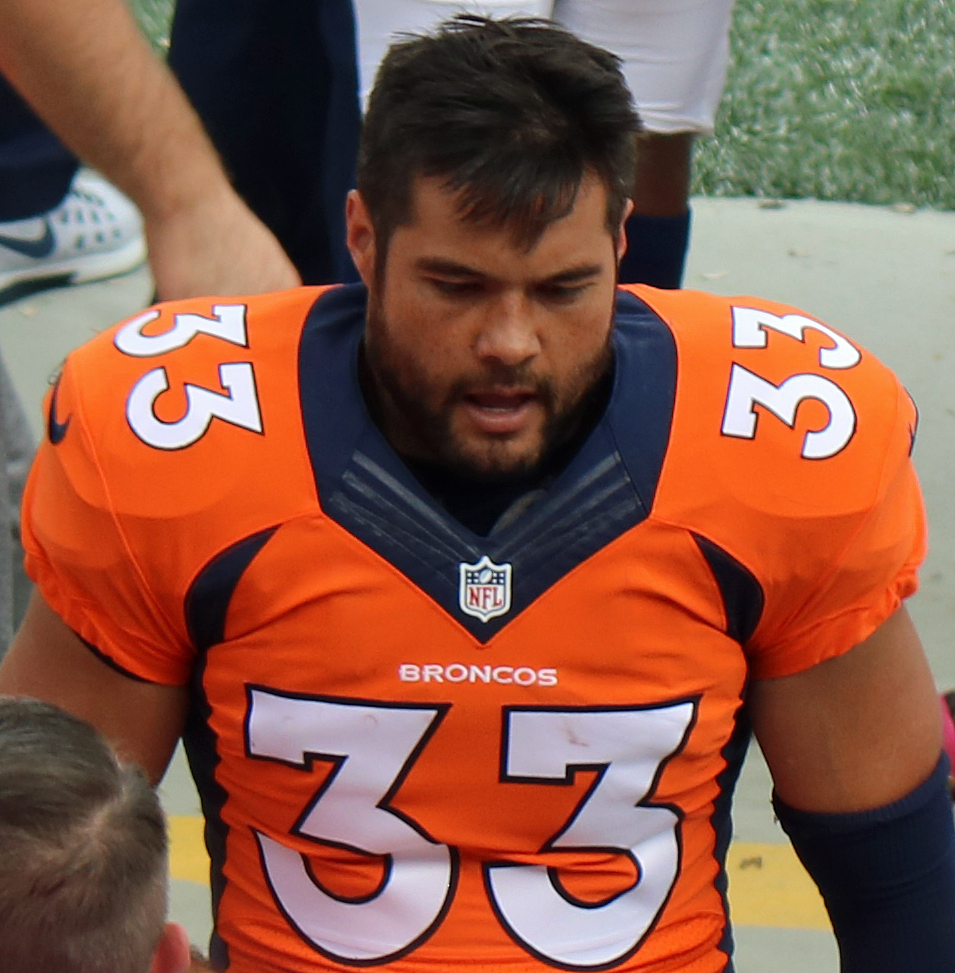
- Keo with the Denver Broncos in 2016

No. 31, 33, 49
- Position: Defensive back

Personal information
- Born: December 17, 1987 (age 38); Bothell, Washington, U.S.
- Listed height: 5 ft 11 in (1.80 m)
- Listed weight: 208 lb (94 kg)

Career information
- High school: Archbishop Murphy (Everett, Washington)
- College: Idaho
- NFL draft: 2011: 5th round, 144th overall pick

Career history

Playing
- Houston Texans (2011–2014); Cincinnati Bengals (2015)*; Denver Broncos (2015–2016); New Orleans Saints (2016)
- * Offseason or practice squad member only

Coaching
- College of Idaho (2018–2019) Defensive backs coach; Alabama (2020) Analyst

Awards and highlights
- As player: Super Bowl champion (50); As coach: CFP national champion (2020)

Career NFL statistics
- Total tackles: 93
- Pass deflections: 8
- Interceptions: 3
- Stats at Pro Football Reference

Shiloh Keo (born December 17, 1987) is an American former professional football player who was a safety in the National Football League (NFL). Selected by the Houston Texans in the fifth round of the 2011 NFL draft, he played college football for the Idaho Vandals.

== Early life ==
Born in Bothell, Washington, northeast of Seattle, Keo is one of seven children of Regan and Diana Keo. Regan is an ILWU longshoreman of native Hawaiian origin, and Diana is Cuban-American; they coached football and softball for 27 years.

Keo is a 2006 graduate of Archbishop Murphy High School in Everett, north of Seattle, where he played under head coach Terry Ennis. He transferred from Woodinville in 2004, following his sophomore year. As a senior in 2005, he played in the 2A state championship game at the Tacoma Dome; both teams entered undefeated, but top-ranked AMHS lost to Pullman by four points.

== College career ==
Keo earned the starting job as a true freshman at the University of Idaho in 2006 under head coach Dennis Erickson, establishing himself as a leader in the secondary with 72 total tackles. He was named an honorable mention on the Sporting News All-Freshman Team. In 2007 under first-year head coach Robb Akey, Keo was the Vandals' team MVP; he established a new school record with a 100-yard punt return against Northern Illinois, in addition to also setting records in punt return yardage and punt return average.

Injured early during the 2008 season, Keo redshirted and returned as a first team all-WAC conference safety as a junior in 2009, Idaho's first winning record since 1999, ending with a Humanitarian Bowl victory in Boise. In 2010, Keo was once again named team MVP and earned 2nd team all-WAC conference honors.

== Professional career ==
Pre-draft measurables
Height	Weight	Arm length	Hand span	Wingspan	40-yard dash	10-yard split	20-yard split	20-yard shuttle	Three-cone drill	Vertical jump	Broad jump	Bench press
5 ft 11 1/4 in (1.81 m)	219 lb (99 kg)	30 in (0.76 m)	9 1/2 in (0.24 m)	5 ft 11 3/4 in (1.82 m)	4.66 s	1.58 s	2.67 s	3.90 s	6.55 s	34.0 in (0.86 m)	9 ft 9 in (2.97 m)	24 reps
All values from NFL Combine/Pro Day

=== Houston Texans ===
Keo was selected by the Houston Texans in the fifth round of the 2011 NFL draft, the 144th overall pick. He quickly made his mark in Houston as a standout player on special teams, notching 14 tackles and 1 interception in limited playing time. In 2012, he was voted as a team captain alongside J. J. Watt and Chris Myers.

Going into the 2013 season, Keo battled with veteran Ed Reed for the starting safety position in the Texans' secondary. Keo started the first two games of the season, notching seven tackles and 8 yards rushing after a successful fake punt against the San Diego Chargers in the season opener. The Texans began increasing Keo's involvement in the defense in Week 6 and by Week 9, he was the starting safety. After Reed was cut by the Texans on November 12, Keo was officially listed as the team's starting safety. After an injury sidelined Keo early in the 2014 season, Keo was released from his contract.

=== Cincinnati Bengals ===
Keo signed a future contract with the Cincinnati Bengals and joined the team on February 2, 2015, but was released on September 5.

=== Denver Broncos ===
On December 9, 2015, Keo was signed by the Denver Broncos after tweeting former coach Wade Phillips, to "keep him in mind if another roster opening came around." In the regular season's final game on January 3 against the San Diego Chargers, Keo intercepted a tipped ball off Philip Rivers which ultimately led to the game-winning touchdown drive.

In the AFC Championship Game against the New England Patriots on January 24, 2016, Keo recovered the Patriots' onside kick attempt with twelve seconds left in the game, preserving a 20–18 win. It sent the Broncos to Super Bowl 50 on February 7, where they won 24–10 over the NFC champion Carolina Panthers.

Keo signed a one-year contract with the Broncos on April 18, 2016, but was released on September 17. He was re-signed on September 20, and released on October 25.

=== New Orleans Saints ===
Three weeks later, Keo was signed by the New Orleans Saints on November 9, where he completed the 2016 season. He signed a one-year contract extension on March 8, 2017, but was released on May 15.

== Coaching career ==
From 2018 to 2019, Keo was the defensive backs coach at the College of Idaho.

In 2020, Keo was an analyst for the University of Alabama.

== Personal life ==
Keo met his wife Keanna in college at Idaho, and they settled in 2015 near Boise at Eagle with their two sons. The couple welcomed a third child in the spring of 2016.

In Idaho on February 13, 2016, six days after the Super Bowl win, Keo was pulled over by the state police in Ada County for having a broken taillight. He was subsequently arrested for driving under the influence (DUI). In a drunken rant, Keo was captured on police footage saying such things as "hey, Obama, I can't wait to meet you... tell you about this bullshit" and "this is exactly why we have riots throughout the country, because of this bullshit." Keo later pleaded guilty to misdemeanor DUI, had his driver's license suspended and was ordered to serve a year of probation and pay a $952.50 fine.
