= Owen Daniels (American football) =

American football player (born 1982)

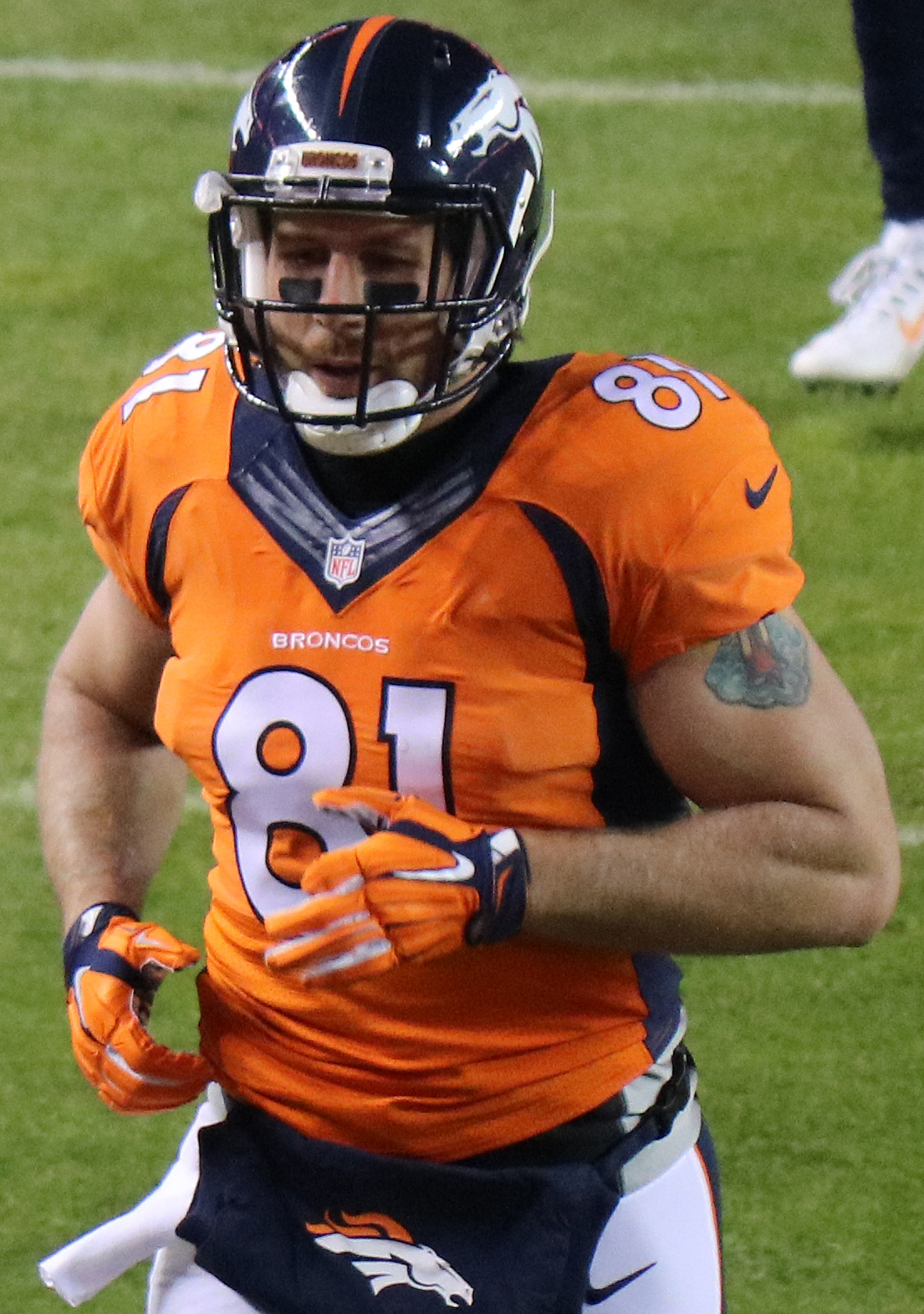
- Daniels with the Denver Broncos in 2015

No. 81
- Position: Tight end

Personal information
- Born: November 9, 1982 (age 44); Naperville, Illinois, U.S.
- Listed height: 6 ft 3 in (1.91 m)
- Listed weight: 245 lb (111 kg)

Career information
- High school: Naperville Central
- College: Wisconsin (2001–2005)
- NFL draft: 2006: 4th round, 98th overall pick

Career history
- Houston Texans (2006–2013); Baltimore Ravens (2014); Denver Broncos (2015)

Awards and highlights
- Super Bowl champion (50); 2× Pro Bowl (2008, 2012); PFWA All-Rookie Team (2006)

Career NFL statistics
- Receptions: 479
- Receiving yards: 5,661
- Receiving touchdowns: 36
- Stats at Pro Football Reference

Owen Gerald Daniels (born November 9, 1982) is an American former professional football tight end. He played college football for the Wisconsin Badgers, and was selected by the Houston Texans in the fourth round of the 2006 NFL draft. He is a two-time Pro Bowl selection. He also played for the Baltimore Ravens and Denver Broncos. As a member of the Broncos, he helped the team win Super Bowl 50 over the Carolina Panthers.

== Early life ==
Daniels attended Naperville Central High School in Naperville, Illinois. As a starting quarterback on the football team, Daniels led Naperville Central to an undefeated IHSA Class 6A State Championship in 1999. He earned Prep Football Report and PrepStar All-American honors and was named a Top 100 prospect nationally by PFR. As a junior, he completed 100 of 168 passing attempts for 1,750 yards and 17 touchdowns, against just one interception. He completed 30 of 35 passes for 562 yards and seven touchdowns in the opening two games of his senior year before a knee injury ended his season. He was also the starting center on his basketball team and a 22-foot (6.70m) long jumper on the track & field team.

== College career ==
Daniels attended the University of Wisconsin–Madison and played for the Wisconsin Badgers football team under coach Barry Alvarez. At Wisconsin, he red-shirted his freshman year at the quarterback position. Early in his college career, he was a back-up quarterback and played special teams, flanker, split end, and wingback. He eventually assumed the starting job at tight end for most of his final two seasons with the Badgers. During his career at Wisconsin, Daniels played in 43 games with 62 receptions for 852 yards (13.7 average). He graduated from the University of Wisconsin with a Bachelor of Science degree in atmospheric and oceanic sciences.

== Professional career ==
Pre-draft measurables
| Height | Weight | Arm length | Hand span | 40-yard dash | 10-yard split | 20-yard split | 20-yard shuttle | Three-cone drill | Vertical jump | Broad jump | Bench press |
|---|---|---|---|---|---|---|---|---|---|---|---|
| 6 ft 3 3/8 in (1.91 m) | 253 lb (115 kg) | 31 3/4 in (0.81 m) | 9 1/2 in (0.24 m) | 4.65 s | 1.64 s | 2.71 s | 4.10 s | 6.87 s | 34.5 in (0.88 m) | 9 ft 6 in (2.90 m) | 23 reps |
All values from NFL Combine

=== Houston Texans ===
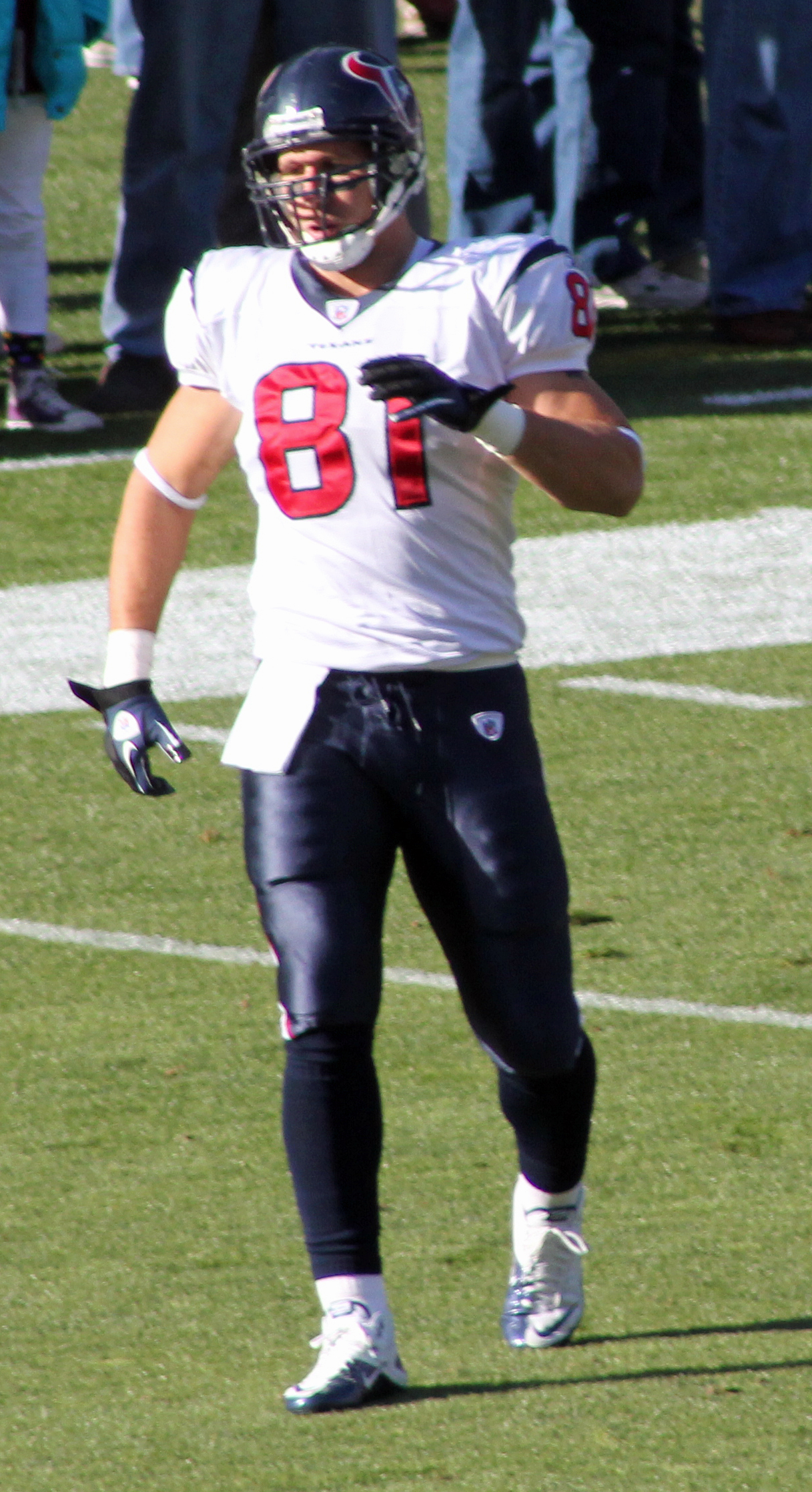
Daniels with the Houston Texans in 2010

Daniels was selected in the fourth round with the 98th overall pick in the 2006 NFL draft. He earned the nickname "The Weatherman" as he majored in meteorology and appeared on the Madison area news delivering the local forecast.

In Week 2, against the Indianapolis Colts, Daniels scored his first professional touchdown on a 33-yard reception. In Week 8, against the Tennessee Titans, Daniels had two receiving touchdowns in the 28–22 loss. In the 2006 season, Daniels finished his rookie season with 34 receptions for 352 yards with five touchdowns. He was named to the PFWA All-Rookie Team.

Daniels completed the 2007 NFL season starting all 16 games with 63 receptions for 768 yards and three touchdowns.

On November 2, 2008, Daniels had his "best game of his career", according to the Houston Chronicle, against the Minnesota Vikings with 11 receptions for 133 yards in Week 9. On December 7, 2008, he and quarterback Matt Schaub combined for a 27-yard completion during a game-winning drive to defeat the Green Bay Packers in Week 14. In Week 16, against the Oakland Raiders, he had seven receptions for 111 receiving yards in the 27–16 loss. He completed the 2008 season with 70 receptions for 862 yards. He earned a nomination to the Pro Bowl.

In Week 7, against the San Francisco 49ers, Daniels had seven receptions for 123 receiving yards and one receiving touchdown in the 24–21 victory. On November 1, 2009, in a game against the Buffalo Bills, Daniels tore his ACL and was placed on season ending injured reserve. In the 2009 season, Daniels finished with 40 receptions for 519 receiving yards and five receiving touchdowns in eight games.

In the 2010 season, Daniels finished with 38 receptions for 471 receiving yards and two receiving touchdowns in 11 games.

On March 3, 2011, Daniels signed a four-year, $22 million contract extension with the Houston Texans. He had seven receptions for 100 receiving yards in the 20–19 victory over the Cincinnati Bengals in Week 14. In the 2011 season, Daniels finished with 54 receptions for 677 receiving yards and three receiving touchdowns.

In the 2012 season, Daniels recorded 62 receptions for 716 receiving yards and six receiving touchdowns. Daniels was named to the Pro Bowl for his performance in the 2012 season. Daniels had a productive postseason. He had nine receptions for 91 yards in the Wild Card Round victory over the Cincinnati Bengals. In the Divisional Round, he had nine receptions for 81 receiving yards in the 41–28 loss to the New England Patriots.

Daniels started out the 2013 season with two receiving touchdowns in the 31–28 victory over the San Diego Chargers. In the 2013 season, Daniels appeared in five games before going on Injured Reserve. He totaled 24 receptions for 252 yards and three touchdowns.

On March 11, 2014, Daniels was released by the team.

=== Baltimore Ravens ===
Daniels agreed on a one-year contract worth $1 million with the Baltimore Ravens and joined head coach John Harbaugh on April 3, 2014. Following a season ending injury to starter Dennis Pitta, Daniels took over the starting role and amassed 48 receptions for 527 yards and four touchdowns.

=== Denver Broncos ===
On March 10, 2015, Daniels signed a three-year, $12 million contract with the Denver Broncos and joined head coach Gary Kubiak. Daniels played his entire NFL career under the tutelage of Kubiak (head coach in Houston and Denver, offensive coordinator in Baltimore) and tight ends coach Brian Pariani. Daniels started the season with only 85 receiving yards and was not a large factor until the game against the Green Bay Packers with three catches for 44 yards. Daniels had six receptions for 102 receiving yards and a touchdown in a 24–27 loss to Indianapolis Colts.

Overall, Daniels finished the 2015 season with 46 catches for 517 yards and three touchdowns. The Broncos had a 12–4 record and earned the #1 seed for the AFC playoffs. Denver defeated the Pittsburgh Steelers in the first playoff game by a score of 23–16 in the Divisional Round. Daniels had two catches for ten yards. In the AFC Championship against the defending champion New England Patriots, Daniels scored two touchdowns to help the Broncos defeat the Patriots by a score of 20–18 to advance to Super Bowl 50 where they beat the Carolina Panthers 24–10. In the victory over the Patriots, Daniels caught the last touchdown pass that quarterback Peyton Manning ever threw in the NFL. In Super Bowl 50, Daniels had one catch for 18 yards on the Broncos' opening drive in the 24–10 victory. Daniels's catch helped the Broncos get in position to score a field goal for the first points of the game.

On March 8, 2016, the Broncos released Daniels after one season with the team.

After his time with the Broncos, Daniels did not sign with another NFL team.

== NFL career statistics ==
Legend
| | Won the Super Bowl |
| **Bold** | Career high |

=== Regular season ===
| Year | Team | Games | | Receiving | | | | | Fumbles | |
| Year | Team | GP | GS | Rec | Yds | Avg | Lng | TD | Fum | Lost |
|---|---|---|---|---|---|---|---|---|---|---|
| 2006 | HOU | 14 | 12 | 34 | 352 | 10.4 | 33T | 5 | 0 | 0 |
| 2007 | HOU | **16** | **16** | 63 | 768 | 12.2 | 29 | 3 | **4** | **3** |
| 2008 | HOU | **16** | **16** | **70** | **862** | 12.3 | 35 | 2 | 2 | 1 |
| 2009 | HOU | 8 | 8 | 40 | 519 | **13.0** | **44** | 5 | 1 | 0 |
| 2010 | HOU | 11 | 10 | 38 | 471 | 12.4 | 31 | 2 | 0 | 0 |
| 2011 | HOU | 15 | 15 | 54 | 677 | 12.5 | 34 | 3 | 0 | 0 |
| 2012 | HOU | 15 | 14 | 62 | 716 | 11.5 | 39T | **6** | 0 | 0 |
| 2013 | HOU | 5 | 5 | 24 | 252 | 10.5 | 28 | 3 | 0 | 0 |
| 2014 | BAL | 15 | 13 | 48 | 527 | 11.0 | 39 | 4 | 0 | 0 |
| 2015 | DEN | **16** | **16** | 46 | 517 | 11.2 | 37 | 3 | 0 | 0 |
| Career | | 131 | 125 | 479 | 5,661 | 11.8 | 44 | 36 | 7 | 4 |

=== Playoffs ===
| Year | Team | Games | | Receiving | | | | | Fumbles | |
| Year | Team | GP | GS | Rec | Yds | Avg | Lng | TD | Fum | Lost |
|---|---|---|---|---|---|---|---|---|---|---|
| 2011 | HOU | 2 | 2 | 4 | 55 | 13.8 | 21 | 0 | 0 | 0 |
| 2012 | HOU | 2 | 2 | **18** | **172** | 9.6 | **24** | 0 | 0 | 0 |
| 2014 | BAL | 2 | 2 | 8 | 111 | **13.9** | 23 | 1 | 0 | 0 |
| 2015 | DEN | **3** | **3** | 5 | 61 | 12.2 | 21 | **2** | 0 | 0 |
| Career | | 9 | 9 | 35 | 399 | 11.4 | 24 | 3 | 0 | 0 |

== Personal life ==
Owen has been married to his wife, Angela, since 2013. The couple met at the Blondes vs. Brunettes charity football game. The couple had their first date in Ibiza and it is also where Owen proposed to her. Together they had their first child in 2015, Henry. He makes regular television appearances as an expert discussing the impacts of weather on American football.
