= 2009 Tennessee Titans season =

50th season in franchise history

- Owner: Bud Adams
- General manager: Mike Reinfeldt
- Head coach: Jeff Fisher
- Home stadium: LP Field

Results
- Record: 8–8
- Division place: 3rd AFC South
- Playoffs: Did not qualify
- All-Pros: Chris Johnson (1st team); Michael Roos (2nd team)
- Pro Bowlers: 4: QB Vince Young; RB Chris Johnson; C Kevin Mawae; DE Kyle Vanden Bosch

The Tennessee Titans played their 50th season in 2009. It was their 40th season in the National Football League (NFL) and their 13th in Tennessee. The Titans aimed to equal or improve on their 2008 NFL-best 13–3 record; however, they lost the first six games of the season. The Titans switched to Vince Young as starting quarterback and won eight out of their remaining ten games, losing only to the Indianapolis Colts and San Diego Chargers. The 42–17 loss to the Chargers in Week 16 eliminated the team from playoff contention for the first time since 2006.

Second-year running back Chris Johnson won the NFL rushing title with 2,006 rushing yards, and set the NFL record for most yards from scrimmage in a single season, with 2,509.

From 2009 to 2016, the Titans would fail to qualify for the playoffs.

The 2009 Titans became the first, and, as of 2026, only team in NFL history to lose their first 6 games, then win their next 5.

== Coaching staff ==
2009 Tennessee Titans staff
Front office: Founder/owner/chairman/president/CEO – Bud Adams; Senior executive vice president/general counsel – Steve Underwood; Executive vice president/general manager – Mike Reinfeldt; Senior director of football administration – Vincent Marino; Director of pro scouting – Lake Dawson; National supervisor of college scouting – C. O. Brocato; Head coaches: Head coach/executive vice president – Jeff Fisher; Assistant head coach/linebackers – Dave McGinnis; Offensive coaches: Offensive coordinator – Mike Heimerdinger; Quarterbacks – Craig Johnson; Running backs Earnest Byner; Wide receivers – Fred Graves; Tight ends – John Zernhelt; Offensive line – Mike Munchak; Offensive quality control - Dowell Loggains; Offensive assistant – Richie Wessman	Defensive coaches: Defensive coordinator – Chuck Cecil; Defensive line – Jim Washburn; Secondary – Marcus Robertson; Assistant secondary – Tim Hauck; Special teams coaches: Special teams – Alan Lowry; Assistant special teams – Marty Galbraith; Strength and Conditioning Coaches: Assistant head coach/strength and conditioning – Steve Watterson

== Final roster ==
2009 Tennessee Titans roster
Quarterbacks (QB): 5 Kerry Collins; 10 Vince Young; Running backs (RB): 45 Ahmard Hall FB; 28 Chris Johnson; 35 Alvin Pearman; 21 Javon Ringer; 25 LenDale White; Wide receivers (WR): 18 Kenny Britt; 19 Dominique Edison; 12 Justin Gage; 87 Lavelle Hawkins; 85 Nate Washington; Tight ends (TE): 89 Jared Cook; 83 Alge Crumpler; 80 Bo Scaife; 88 Craig Stevens	Offensive linemen (OL): 54 Eugene Amano G; 64 Leroy Harris G; 70 Troy Kropog T; 68 Kevin Mawae C; 66 Mike Otto T; 71 Michael Roos T; 73 Jake Scott G; 76 David Stewart T; 61 Fernando Velasco C; Defensive linemen (DL): 98 Dave Ball DE; 97 Tony Brown DT; 78 Jacob Ford DE; 75 Jovan Haye DT; 95 William Hayes DE; 90 Jevon Kearse DE; 94 Sen'Derrick Marks DT; 93 Kyle Vanden Bosch DE; 96 Kevin Vickerson DT	Linebackers (LB): 56 Colin Allred MLB; 99 Eric Bakhtiari OLB; 59 Stanford Keglar OLB; 51 Gerald McRath OLB; 55 Stephen Tulloch MLB; 52 Jamie Winborn OLB; Defensive backs (DB): 31 Cortland Finnegan CB; 22 Vincent Fuller FS; 33 Michael Griffin FS; 37 Roderick Hood CB; 24 Chris Hope SS; 26 Kevin Kaesviharn CB; 36 Jamar Love CB; 30 Jason McCourty CB; 29 Ryan Mouton CB; 23 Donnie Nickey FS; Special teams (ST): 58 Ken Amato LS; 2 Rob Bironas K; 6 Brett Kern P	Practice squad: 7 John David Booty QB; 79 Kareem Brown DE; 77 Ryan Durand G; 62 Mitch King DT (PS/I); 16 Phillip Morris WR; 57 Mike Rivera OLB; 39 Nick Schommer S; 11 Paul Williams WR; Reserve: 53 Keith Bulluck MLB (IR); -- Pete Clifford OT (IR); 20 Nick Harper CB (IR); 15 Craig Hentrich P (IR); 91 Jason Jones DT (IR); 84 Mark Jones WR (IR); 50 David Thornton OLB (IR); Rookies in italics 53 active, 8 reserve, 7 practice squad

== Schedule ==
The Titans played the Buffalo Bills on August 8 in the Pro Football Hall of Fame Game, pitting teams owned by Bud Adams (Titans) and Ralph C. Wilson, Jr. (Bills). They were two of the three surviving members of the "Foolish Club", the eight original owners of American Football League franchises. The 2009 NFL season celebrated what would have been the fiftieth of the American Football League (AFL). Both the Bills and Titans wore AFL throwbacks, with the Titans in Houston Oilers uniforms.

=== Preseason ===
Week	Date	Opponent	Result	Record	Venue	Recap
HOF	August 9	Buffalo Bills	W 21–18	1–0	Fawcett Stadium	Recap
1	August 15	Tampa Bay Buccaneers	W 27–20	2–0	LP Field	Recap
2	August 21	at Dallas Cowboys	L 10–30	2–1	Cowboys Stadium	Recap
3	August 29	at Cleveland Browns	L 17–23	2–2	Cleveland Browns Stadium	Recap
4	September 3	Green Bay Packers	W 27–13	3–2	LP Field	Recap

=== Regular season ===
In addition to their regular games with AFC South division rivals, the Titans played games against the AFC East and NFC West according to the NFL's schedule rotation, and also played games against the Pittsburgh Steelers and the San Diego Chargers based upon finishing positions from 2008.

Week	Date	Opponent	Result	Record	Venue	Recap
1	September 10	at Pittsburgh Steelers	L 10–13 (OT)	0–1	Heinz Field	Recap
2	September 20	Houston Texans	L 31–34	0–2	LP Field	Recap
3	September 27	at New York Jets	L 17–24	0–3	Giants Stadium	Recap
4	October 4	at Jacksonville Jaguars	L 17–37	0–4	Jacksonville Municipal Stadium	Recap
5	October 11	Indianapolis Colts	L 9–31	0–5	LP Field	Recap
6	October 18	at New England Patriots	L 0–59	0–6	Gillette Stadium	Recap
7	Bye					
8	November 1	Jacksonville Jaguars	W 30–13	1–6	LP Field	Recap
9	November 8	at San Francisco 49ers	W 34–27	2–6	Candlestick Park	Recap
10	November 15	Buffalo Bills	W 41–17	3–6	LP Field	Recap
11	November 23	at Houston Texans	W 20–17	4–6	Reliant Stadium	Recap
12	November 29	Arizona Cardinals	W 20–17	5–6	LP Field	Recap
13	December 6	at Indianapolis Colts	L 17–27	5–7	Lucas Oil Stadium	Recap
14	December 13	St. Louis Rams	W 47–7	6–7	LP Field	Recap
15	December 20	Miami Dolphins	W 27–24 (OT)	7–7	LP Field	Recap
16	December 25	San Diego Chargers	L 17–42	7–8	LP Field	Recap
17	January 3	at Seattle Seahawks	W 17–13	8–8	Qwest Field	Recap

=== Standings ===
AFC South
	W	L	T	PCT	DIV	CONF	PF	PA	STK
^{(1)} Indianapolis Colts	14	2	0	.875	6–0	10–2	416	307	L2
Houston Texans	9	7	0	.563	1–5	6–6	388	333	W4
Tennessee Titans	8	8	0	.500	2–4	4–8	354	402	W1
Jacksonville Jaguars	7	9	0	.438	3–3	6–6	290	380	L4

== Regular season games ==
=== Week 1: at Pittsburgh Steelers ===
Quarter	1	2	3	4	OT	Total
Titans	0	7	0	3	0	10
Steelers	0	7	0	3	3	13

at Heinz Field, Pittsburgh, Pennsylvania

- Game time: 8:30 PM EDT / 7:30 PM CDT
- Game weather: 67 °F or 19.4 °C (Mostly Cloudy)
- Game attendance: 65,110
- Referee: Bill Leavy
- TV announcers (NBC): Al Michaels, Cris Collinsworth, & Andrea Kremer

The Titans began their season at Heinz Field for the annual kickoff game against the defending Super Bowl champions, the Pittsburgh Steelers. After a scoreless first quarter, Tennessee trailed near the end of the second quarter as Steelers quarterback Ben Roethlisberger completed a 34-yard touchdown pass to wide receiver Santonio Holmes. Afterwards, the Titans would tie the game as quarterback Kerry Collins completed a 16-yard touchdown pass to wide receiver Justin Gage.

After a scoreless third quarter, Tennessee took the lead as kicker Rob Bironas got a 45-yard field goal, while Pittsburgh kicker Jeff Reed made a 32-yard field goal to tie the game. In overtime, the Steelers got the win as Reed nailed a game-winning 33-yard field goal.

With the loss, the Titans started the season out at 0–1.

=== Week 2: vs. Houston Texans ===
Quarter	1	2	3	4	Total
Texans	7	17	7	3	34
Titans	14	10	7	0	31

at LP Field, Nashville, Tennessee

- Game time: 1:00 PM EDT / 12:00 PM CDT
- Game weather: 77 °F or 25 °C (Cloudy)
- Game attendance: 69,143
- Referee: Walt Coleman
- TV announcers (CBS): Gus Johnson & Steve Tasker

Hoping to rebound from their loss against the Steelers, the Titans went home for their Week 2 home opener against their AFC South foe, the Houston Texans. Tennessee would strike first in the opening quarter as running back Chris Johnson got a 57-yard touchdown run. The Texans would answer with quarterback Matt Schaub completing a 19-yard touchdown pass to wide receiver Andre Johnson, yet the Titans would reply with quarterback Kerry Collins completing a 69-yard touchdown pass to Johnson. Tennessee would add onto their lead in the second quarter as Collins completed an 8-yard touchdown pass to wide receiver Nate Washington. However, Houston took the lead as Schaub completed a 72-yard touchdown pass to Johnson and a 29-yard touchdown pass to Jacoby Jones, followed by a 38-yard field goal from kicker Kris Brown. The Titans would close out the half as kicker Rob Bironas made a 40-yard field goal.

In the third quarter, Tennessee would regain the lead as Johnson got a 91-yard touchdown run. The Texans would tie the game again as Schaub completed a 1-yard touchdown pass to tight end Owen Daniels. In the fourth quarter, Houston took the lead as Brown nailed a 23-yard field goal. Afterwards, the Texans' defense prevented any attempt at an offensive rally.

With the loss, the Titans drop to 0–2.

=== Week 3: at New York Jets ===
Quarter	1	2	3	4	Total
Titans	0	10	7	0	17
Jets	14	0	7	3	24

at The Meadowlands, East Rutherford, New Jersey

- Game time: 1:00 PM EDT / 12:00 PM CDT
- Game weather: 66 °F or 18.9 °C (Rainy)
- Game attendance: 75,863
- Referee: Mike Carey
- TV announcers (CBS): Greg Gumbel & Dan Dierdorf

Trying to snap a two-game losing skid, the Titans flew to The Meadowlands, donned their Houston Oilers throwbacks, and played a Week 3 AFL Legacy game with the New York Jets. Tennessee would struggle in the first quarter as Jets quarterback Mark Sanchez got a 14-yard touchdown run and completed a 2-yard touchdown pass to tight end Ben Hartsock. The Titans would climb into the game in the second quarter with running back LenDale White's 5-yard touchdown run and kicker Rob Bironas' 38-yard field goal.

In the third quarter, Tennessee would take the lead with quarterback Kerry Collins' 9-yard touchdown pass to wide receiver Nate Washington. However, New York would strike back with Sanchez's 6-yard touchdown pass to wide receiver Jerricho Cotchery. The Jets would increase their lead in the fourth quarter with kicker Jay Feely's 48-yard field goal. The Titans tried to rally, but New York's defense would stand firm and prevented any possible comeback attempt.

With the loss, Tennessee would fall to 0–3 for the first time since the 2006 season.

=== Week 4: at Jacksonville Jaguars ===
Quarter	1	2	3	4	Total
Titans	0	3	6	8	17
Jaguars	10	17	3	7	37

at Jacksonville Municipal Stadium, Jacksonville, Florida

- Game time: 1:00 PM EDT / 12:00 PM CDT
- Game weather: 79 °F or 26.1 °C (Mostly Cloudy)
- Game attendance: 49,014
- Referee: Alberto Riveron
- TV announcers (CBS): Dick Enberg & Dan Fouts

Hoping to save their season, the Titans flew to Jacksonville Municipal Stadium for a Week 4 AFC South duel with the Jacksonville Jaguars. Tennessee would trail early in the first quarter as Jaguars kicker Josh Scobee got a 22-yard field goal, followed by running back Maurice Jones-Drew's 9-yard touchdown. The Titans would get in the game in the second quarter with kicker Rob Bironas making a 29-yard field goal. However, Jacksonville came right back with quarterback David Garrard completing 9-yard and 15-yard touchdown passes to wide receiver Mike Sims-Walker, with Scobee's 50-yard field goal in between.

The Jaguars would continue to build their lead as Scobee nailed a 33-yard field goal. Tennessee would then begin its comeback attempt with quarterback Kerry Collins completing a 14-yard touchdown pass to wide receiver Nate Washington (with a failed 2-point conversion). The Titans kept their rally going in the fourth quarter with Collins getting a 10-yard touchdown run, followed by running back Chris Johnson's 2-point conversion run. However, Jacksonville would pull away with Garrard's 33-yard touchdown pass to tight end Marcedes Lewis.

With this loss, Tennessee fell to 0–4.

=== Week 5: vs. Indianapolis Colts ===
Quarter	1	2	3	4	Total
Colts	7	14	7	3	31
Titans	6	3	0	0	9

at LP Field, Nashville, Tennessee

- Game time: 8:20 PM EDT / 7:20 PM CDT
- Game weather: 55 °F or 12.8 °C (Mostly Cloudy)
- Game attendance: 69,143
- Referee: Walt Anderson
- TV announcers (NBC): Al Michaels, Cris Collinsworth, & Andrea Kremer

Down four games, the Titans went home for a Week 5 Sunday night duel with their AFC South rival, the Indianapolis Colts. Tennessee would trail in the first quarter as Colts quarterback Peyton Manning found wide receiver Reggie Wayne on a 3-yard touchdown pass. The Titans would answer with a 49-yard and a 43-yard field goal from kicker Rob Bironas, but Indianapolis came right back in the second quarter with running back Joseph Addai’s 1-yard touchdown run. Tennessee tried to keep it close with Bironas nailing a 46-yard field goal, yet the Colts continued its domination with Manning hooking up with wide receiver Austin Collie on a 39-yard touchdown pass. Afterwards, Indianapolis would pull away in the second half. Manning connected with Collie again on a 6-yard touchdown pass, followed by kicker Adam Vinatieri booting a 23-yard field goal.

With the loss, the Titans fell to 0–5.

=== Week 6: at New England Patriots ===
Quarter	1	2	3	4	Total
Titans	0	0	0	0	0
Patriots	10	35	14	0	59

at Gillette Stadium, Foxborough, Massachusetts

- Game time: 4:15 PM EDT / 3:15 PM CDT
- Game weather: 39 °F or 3.9 °C (Rain/Snow)
- Game attendance: 68,756
- Referee: Gene Steratore
- TV announcers (CBS): Jim Nantz & Phil Simms

Still looking for their first win of the season, the Titans flew to Gillette Stadium, donned Oilers throwback uniforms, and played a Week 6 AFL Legacy game with the New England Patriots in a rare October snowstorm. Tennessee's struggles continued as Patriots running back Laurence Maroney got a 45-yard touchdown run, followed by kicker Stephen Gostkowski making a 33-yard field goal. Things got worse for the Titans in the second quarter as quarterback Tom Brady completed five touchdown passes, two to wide receiver Randy Moss (40-yard and 28-yard), one to running back Kevin Faulk (38-yard), and two to wide receiver Wes Welker (30-yard and 5-yard). The Patriots' 45–0 halftime lead was the largest in NFL history. New England would then conclude their scoring in the third quarter with Brady's 9-yard touchdown pass to Moss, followed by backup quarterback Brian Hoyer's one-yard touchdown run.

To make matters worse, the Titans finished the game with -7 passing yards. The Titans were the last team to finish with negative passing yards until the Giants finished with -10 passing yards in their week 17 game against the Bears on January 2, 2022.

With the loss, not only did the Titans go into their bye week at 0–6 (their first such start since 1984, when the team was the Houston Oilers), but suffered their worst loss in franchise history, eclipsing a 61–7 loss to Cincinnati in 1989. This was the first 59–0 game since 1976, and only the fourth in NFL history. It was the most lopsided game in the 2009 season, and tied the post-merger record for largest margin of victory.

=== Week 8: vs. Jacksonville Jaguars ===
Quarter	1	2	3	4	Total
Jaguars	0	7	6	0	13
Titans	3	10	10	7	30

at LP Field, Nashville, Tennessee

- Game time: 4:05 PM EST / 3:05 PM CST
- Game weather: 55 °F or 12.8 °C (Sunny)
- Game attendance: 69,143
- Referee: Pete Morelli
- TV announcers (CBS): Gus Johnson & Steve Tasker

Coming off their bye week, the Titans went home for a Week 8 AFC South rematch with the Jacksonville Jaguars. In this game, quarterback Vince Young would make his first start since Week 1 of the 2008 NFL season.

Tennessee got off to a fast start in the first quarter with kicker Rob Bironas booting a 48-yard field goal. In the second quarter, the Titans would add onto their lead as Young hooked up with wide receiver Nate Washington on a 6-yard touchdown pass, followed by Bironas nailing a 25-yard field goal. The Jaguars would answer with an 80-yard touchdown run from running back Maurice Jones-Drew.

In the third quarter, Jacksonville would tie the game as Jones-Drew got a 79-yard touchdown run (with a blocked PAT), yet Tennessee came right back with a 52-yard touchdown run from running back Chris Johnson and a 45-yard field goal from Bironas. Afterwards, the Titans pulled away in the fourth quarter with Johnson getting an 89-yard touchdown.

With the win, Tennessee improved to 1–6 and snapped a seven-game Losing streak dating back to Week 17 of 2008.

This would become the first game in NFL history where there were four touchdown runs of 50 or more yards. Also, Johnson (24 carries for 228 yards) and Jones-Drew (8 carries for 177 yards) would join the Browns' Bobby Mitchell (14 carries for 232 yards) and the Redskins' Johnny Olszewski (18 carries for 190 yards) on November 15, 1959, as the only pair of opposing running backs to both have at least 175 yards rushing in the same game.

=== Week 9: at San Francisco 49ers ===
Quarter	1	2	3	4	Total
Titans	3	7	7	17	34
49ers	3	14	0	10	27

at Candlestick Park, San Francisco, California

- Game time: 4:15 PM EST / 3:15 PM CST
- Game weather: 63 °F or 17.2 °C (Sunny)
- Game attendance: 69,732
- Referee: Carl Cheffers
- TV announcers (CBS): Ian Eagle & Rich Gannon

Coming off their divisional home win over the Jaguars, the Titans flew to Candlestick Park for a Week 9 interconference duel with the San Francisco 49ers. Tennessee would trail early in the first quarter as 49ers kicker Joe Nedney got a 40-yard field goal, yet the Titans would answer with kicker Rob Bironas making a 21-yard field goal. The Titans would take the lead in the second quarter as quarterback Vince Young got a 10-yard touchdown run, but San Francisco would close out the half with a 3-yard touchdown run from running back Frank Gore and a 12-yard touchdown pass from quarterback Alex Smith to wide receiver Jason Hill.

In the third quarter, Tennessee would tie the game as running back Chris Johnson got a 1-yard touchdown. The 49ers would retake their lead in the fourth quarter with Nedney nailing a 25-yard field goal, yet the Titans would regain the lead with Johnson's 2-yard touchdown run, Bironas' 28-yard field goal, and cornerback Cortland Finnegan's 39-yard interception return for a touchdown. San Francisco tried to make a comeback as Smith found Hill again on a 3-yard touchdown pass, yet Tennessee's defense held up for the victory.

With the win, the Titans improved to 2–6. As of 2025, this marks the Titans last win over the 49ers.

=== Week 10: vs. Buffalo Bills ===
Quarter	1	2	3	4	Total
Bills	7	7	3	0	17
Titans	14	3	0	24	41

at LP Field, Nashville, Tennessee

- Game time: 1:00 PM EST / 12:00 PM CST
- Game weather: 71 °F or 21.7 °C (Sunny)
- Game attendance: 69,143
- Referee: John Parry
- TV announcers (CBS): Ian Eagle & Rich Gannon

Coming off their road win over the 49ers, the Titans went home, donned their Houston Oilers throwbacks, and played a Week 10 AFL Legacy game with the Buffalo Bills. Tennessee would trail early in the first quarter as Bills running back Fred Jackson threw a 27-yard touchdown pass to wide receiver Lee Evans. The Titans would respond as running back Chris Johnson got a 28-yard touchdown run, followed by quarterback Vince Young hooking up with wide receiver Nate Washington on a 14-yard touchdown pass. In the second quarter, Tennessee would increase their lead as kicker Rob Bironas booted a 38-yard field goal. Buffalo would end the half with quarterback Trent Edwards finding Evans on an 8-yard touchdown pass.

The Bills would tie the game in the third quarter with kicker Rian Lindell booting a 25-yard field goal, yet the Titans would explode with points in the fourth quarter. It began with Johnson's 1-yard touchdown run, followed by Bironas' 51-yard field goal. It would follow up with safety Vincent Fuller returning an interception 26 yards for a touchdown and cornerback Rod Hood returning an interception 31 yards for a touchdown.

With the win, Tennessee would improve to 3–6.

Chris Johnson (26 carries, 132 yards, 2 TDs and 9 catches, 100 yards) would join Billy Cannon as the only players in franchise history to rush and receive for 100 yards in one game. He would also join Earl Campbell in 1980 as the only players in franchise history to have two rushing touchdowns in three-straight games.

At the end of the game, owner Bud Adams raised his middle fingers to Buffalo players from his box and was subsequently fined $250,000 by Roger Goodell, who was in attendance at the game.

=== Week 11: at Houston Texans ===
Quarter	1	2	3	4	Total
Titans	0	14	3	3	20
Texans	7	7	3	0	17

at Reliant Stadium, Houston, Texas

- Game time: 8:30 PM EST / 7:30 PM CST
- Game weather: 66 °F or 18.9 °C (Clear)
- Game attendance: 71,153
- Referee: Jerome Boger
- TV announcers (ESPN): Mike Tirico, Ron Jaworski, Jon Gruden & Michele Tafoya

Coming off their win over the Bills, the Titans flew to Reliant Stadium for an AFC South rivalry match against the Houston Texans. In the first quarter the Titans trailed early as quarterback Matt Schaub got a 3-yard touchdown pass to RB Steve Slaton. In the second quarter, they replied with quarterback Vince Young completing a 13-yard touchdown pass to WR Kenny Britt. Then Houston tried to pull away as Schaub hooked up with WR Andre Johnson on a 13-yard touchdown pass, until the Titans replied again with RB LenDale White making a 1-yard touchdown run.

The Titans got the lead in the third quarter as kicker Rob Bironas made a 50-yard field goal, but the Texans replied to tie the game when kicker Kris Brown made a 26-yard field goal. In the fourth quarter the Titans scored for the win when Bironas got a 53-yard field goal. Brown had a chance to tie the game and sent it into overtime for the second game in a row and for the second game in a row he missed giving the Titans the victory.

With the win, the Titans improve to 4–6.

=== Week 12: vs. Arizona Cardinals ===
Quarter	1	2	3	4	Total
Cardinals	0	3	7	7	17
Titans	3	3	7	7	20

at LP Field, Nashville, Tennessee

- Game time: 4:15 PM EST / 3:15 PM CST
- Game weather: 56 °F or 13.3 °C (Cloudy)
- Game attendance: 69,143
- Referee: Terry McAulay
- TV announcers (Fox): Sam Rosen, Tim Ryan & Charissa Thompson

The only first quarter score would be a Rob Bironas field goal that gave the Titans a 3–nothing lead. At the close of the first half, Tennessee was leading the defending NFC winner 6–3, but an extended play with 5 seconds left on Arizona's 20 or so, would diminish Tennessee's chance for a field goal. Tennessee scored the first touchdown during the second half to take a 13–3 lead, but Arizona scored 14 straight points with the help of Lerod Stevens-Howling returning a kickoff for a touchdown. Facing a 17–13 deficit at their own 1-yard line, Vince Young led the Titans on an 18 play drive which featured him throwing for 94 yards, running for 5 and converting three 4th downs including a 4th and goal to Kenny Britt as time expired for a touchdown to win 20–17. The win improved the Titans to 5–6 and marked the first time in NFL history that a team won five consecutive games after losing their first six.

=== Week 13: at Indianapolis Colts ===
Quarter	1	2	3	4	Total
Titans	3	7	0	7	17
Colts	7	17	0	3	27

at Lucas Oil Stadium, Indianapolis, Indiana

- Game time: 1:00 PM EST / 12:00 PM CST
- Game weather: None (Retractable Roof Closed)
- Game attendance: 66,321
- Referee: Ron Winter
- TV announcers (CBS): Ian Eagle & Rich Gannon

Game information
First quarter
- IND – Joseph Addai 8-yard run, 13:02 (Matt Stover kick), Colts 7–0. Drive: 5 plays, 75 yards, 1:58.
- TEN – Rob Bironas 20-yard field goal, 6:34. Colts 7–3. Drive: 13 plays, 69 yards, 6:28.

Second quarter

- IND – Joseph Addai 1-yard run, 11:42 (Stover kick), Colts 14–3. Drive: 10 plays, 77 yards, 3:56.
- IND – Austin Collie 4-yard pass from Peyton Manning, 1:55 (Stover kick), Colts 21–3. Drive: 9 plays, 42 yards, 3:48.
- TEN – Kenny Britt 6-yard pass from Vince Young, 0:20 (Bironas kick), Colts 21–10. Drive: 8 plays, 66 yards, 1:35.
- IND – Matt Stover 43-yard field goal, 0:00, Colts 24–10. Drive: 4 plays, 38 yards, 0:20.

Third quarter

- No scoring play

Fourth quarter

- IND – Matt Stover 36-yard field goal, 3:14, Colts 27–10. Drive: 15 plays, 69 yards, 7:23.
- TEN – Bo Scaife 17-yard pass from Vince Young, 1:23 (Bironas kick), Colts 27–17. Drive: 6 plays, 46 yards, 1:51.

With the loss, the Titans' five-game winning streak came to an end as they were swept by the Colts. After losing their third consecutive contest against the Colts, the Titans fell to 5–7.

=== Week 14: vs. St. Louis Rams ===
Quarter	1	2	3	4	Total
Rams	0	0	0	7	7
Titans	14	9	10	14	47

at LP Field, Nashville, Tennessee

- Game time: 4:05 PM EST / 3:05 PM CST
- Game weather: 53 °F or 11.7 °C (Cloudy)
- Game attendance: 69,143
- Referee: Jeff Triplette
- TV announcers (Fox): Chris Rose & Trent Green

With the win, the Titans improved to 6–7.

=== Week 15: vs. Miami Dolphins ===
Quarter	1	2	3	4	OT	Total
Dolphins	3	3	3	15	0	24
Titans	7	10	7	0	3	27

at LP Field, Nashville, Tennessee

- Game time: 1:00 PM EST / 12:00 PM CST
- Game weather: 35 °F or 1.7 °C (Cloudy)
- Game attendance: 69,143
- Referee: Scott Green
- TV announcers (CBS): Dick Enberg & Dan Fouts

With both teams fighting for their playoff lives the Titans clawed to a 24–9 lead over the Dolphins, but two fourth-quarter touchdowns by Chad Henne forced overtime. Henne, however, was intercepted in overtime, setting up a 46-yard game-winning Rob Bironas field goal.

With the win, the Titans improved to 7–7.

=== Week 16: vs. San Diego Chargers ===
Quarter	1	2	3	4	Total
Chargers	7	14	14	7	42
Titans	3	7	0	7	17

at LP Field, Nashville, Tennessee

- Game time: 7:30 PM EST / 6:30 PM CST
- Game weather: 32 °F or 0 °C (Clear)
- Game attendance: 69,143
- Referee: Tony Corrente
- TV announcers (NFLN): Bob Papa & Matt Millen

With the loss, the Titans fell to 7–8. They were mathematically eliminated from postseason play.

=== Week 17: at Seattle Seahawks ===
Quarter	1	2	3	4	Total
Titans	7	0	3	7	17
Seahawks	0	7	3	3	13

at Qwest Field, Seattle, Washington

- Game time: 4:15 PM EST / 3:15 PM CST
- Game weather: 46 °F or 7.8 °C, relative humidity 85%, no wind
- Game attendance: 67,002
- Referee: Ed Hochuli
- TV announcers (CBS): Ian Eagle & Rich Gannon

With the win, the Titans were good enough to finish the season at 8–8 and 3rd place in their division.
