= 2008 Tennessee Titans season =

49th season in franchise history; last playoff appearance for 9 years

- Owner: Bud Adams
- General manager: Mike Reinfeldt
- Head coach: Jeff Fisher
- Offensive coordinator: Mike Heimerdinger
- Defensive coordinator: Jim Schwartz
- Home stadium: LP Field

Results
- Record: 13–3
- Division place: 1st AFC South
- Playoffs: Lost Divisional Playoffs (vs. Ravens) 10–13
- All-Pros: 5: T Michael Roos (1st team); C Kevin Mawae (1st team); DT Albert Haynesworth (1st team); CB Cortland Finnegan (1st team); T David Stewart (2nd team)
- Pro Bowlers: 8: QB Kerry Collins; RB Chris Johnson; LT Michael Roos; SS Chris Hope; CB Cortland Finnegan; FS Michael Griffin; DT Albert Haynesworth; C Kevin Mawae

The 2008 Tennessee Titans season was the team's 49th season and 39th in the National Football League (NFL), their 12th in Tennessee, and their tenth as the Titans.

Despite making the playoffs in the 2007 season with a record of 10–6, the Titans were expected by most sportswriters to finish third or even fourth in the AFC South. They nonetheless compiled a 13–3 regular season record—the best in the NFL—and won home-field advantage for the duration of the playoffs after clinching AFC South on December 7 after a win over the Cleveland Browns and a 10–0 start. The Titans defense was ranked number two in the NFL behind the Pittsburgh Steelers, giving up only 234 points. The Titans lost two of their last three regular season games, and were eliminated by the Baltimore Ravens in the divisional round.

This was the last season the Tennessee Titans qualified for the playoffs until 2017, and also the last season when the Titans won the AFC South until 2020, when they also lost to the Ravens in their first playoff game. It would be the final season the Titans gained the AFC's top seed for 13 years.

== 2008 NFL draft ==
Round	Selection	Player	Position	College
1	24	Chris Johnson	Running back	East Carolina
2	54	Jason Jones	Defensive tackle	Eastern Michigan
3	85	Craig Stevens	Tight end	California
4	103	William Hayes	Defensive end	Winston-Salem State
4	126	Lavelle Hawkins	Wide receiver	California
4	134	Stanford Keglar	Linebacker	Purdue
7	229	Cary Williams	Cornerback	Washburn

== Roster ==
2008 Tennessee Titans roster
Quarterbacks (QB): 5 Kerry Collins; 8 Chris Simms; 10 Vince Young; Running backs (RB): 35 Quinton Ganther; 45 Ahmard Hall FB; 42 Chris Henry; 28 Chris Johnson; 25 LenDale White; Wide receivers (WR): 17 Chris Davis; 12 Justin Gage; 87 Lavelle Hawkins; 81 Brandon Jones; 19 Justin McCareins; 11 Paul Williams; Tight ends (TE): 83 Alge Crumpler; 80 Bo Scaife; 88 Craig Stevens	Offensive linemen (OL): 54 Eugene Amano G; 64 Leroy Harris G; 70 Daniel Loper T; 68 Kevin Mawae C; 66 Mike Otto T; 71 Michael Roos T; 73 Jake Scott G; 76 David Stewart T; Defensive linemen (DL): 98 Dave Ball DE; 97 Tony Brown DT; 78 Jacob Ford DE; 99 Amon Gordon DT; 95 William Hayes DE; 92 Albert Haynesworth DT; 91 Jason Jones DT; 90 Jevon Kearse DE; 93 Kyle Vanden Bosch DE	Linebackers (LB): 56 Colin Allred OLB; 53 Keith Bulluck OLB; 52 Ryan Fowler MLB; 59 Stanford Keglar OLB; 57 Josh Stamer OLB; 50 David Thornton OLB; 55 Stephen Tulloch MLB; Defensive backs (DB): 29 Chris Carr CB; 31 Cortland Finnegan CB; 22 Vincent Fuller FS; 33 Michael Griffin FS; 20 Nick Harper CB; 26 Tuff Harris FS; 24 Chris Hope SS; 23 Donnie Nickey SS; 38 Tyrone Poole CB; Special teams (ST): 58 Ken Amato LS; 2 Rob Bironas K; 15 Craig Hentrich P	Practice squad: 94 Charles Bennett DE; 67 Doug Datish C/G; 32 Tanard Davis CB; 82 Biren Ealy WR; 77 Derrick Jones DT; 47 Matthew Mulligan TE; 69 Jason Murphy C; 61 Fernando Velasco C; Reserve: 21 Reynaldo Hill CB (IR); 30 Eric King CB (IR); 36 Rafael Little RB (IR); 96 Kevin Vickerson DT (Susp.); 41 Cary Williams CB (IR); 79 Ulrich Winkler DE (IR); Rookies in italics 53 active, 6 reserve, 8 practice squad

== Schedule ==
=== Pre-season ===
Week	Date	Opponent	Result	Game site	Record	Match Report
1	August 9	St. Louis Rams	**W** 34–13	LP Field	1–0	Recap
2	August 16	Oakland Raiders	**W** 17–16	LP Field	2–0	Recap
3	August 22	at Atlanta Falcons	**L** 3–17	Georgia Dome	2–1	Recap
4	August 28	at Green Bay Packers	**W** 23–21	Lambeau Field	3–1	Recap

=== Regular season ===
Week	Date	Opponent	Result	Game site	Record	Match Report
1	September 7	**Jacksonville Jaguars**	**W** 17–10	LP Field	1–0	Recap
2	September 14	at Cincinnati Bengals	**W** 24–7	Paul Brown Stadium	2–0	Recap
3	September 21	**Houston Texans**	**W** 31–12	LP Field	3–0	Recap
4	September 28	Minnesota Vikings	**W** 30–17	LP Field	4–0	Recap
5	October 5	at Baltimore Ravens	**W** 13–10	M&T Bank Stadium	5–0	Recap
6	Bye					
7	October 19	at Kansas City Chiefs	**W** 34–10	Arrowhead Stadium	6–0	Recap
8	October 27	**Indianapolis Colts**	**W** 31–21	LP Field	7–0	Recap
9	November 2	Green Bay Packers	**W** 19–16 (OT)	LP Field	8–0	Recap
10	November 9	at Chicago Bears	**W** 21–14	Soldier Field	9–0	Recap
11	November 16	at **Jacksonville Jaguars**	**W** 24–14	Jacksonville Municipal Stadium	10–0	Recap
12	November 23	New York Jets	**L** 13–34	LP Field	10–1	Recap
13	November 27	at Detroit Lions	**W** 47–10	Ford Field	11–1	Recap
14	December 7	Cleveland Browns	**W** 28–9	LP Field	12–1	Recap
15	December 14	at **Houston Texans**	**L** 12–13	Reliant Stadium	12–2	Recap
16	December 21	Pittsburgh Steelers	**W** 31–14	LP Field	13–2	Recap
17	December 28	at **Indianapolis Colts**	**L** 0–23	Lucas Oil Stadium	13–3	Recap

- Note: Division opponents are in **bold** text.

== Standings ==
AFC South
	W	L	T	PCT	DIV	CONF	PF	PA	STK
^{(1)} Tennessee Titans	13	3	0	.813	4–2	9–3	375	234	L1
^{(5)} Indianapolis Colts	12	4	0	.750	4–2	10–2	377	298	W9
Houston Texans	8	8	0	.500	2–4	5–7	366	394	W1
Jacksonville Jaguars	5	11	0	.313	2–4	3–9	302	367	L2

== Regular season results ==
=== Week 1: vs. Jacksonville Jaguars ===
Week One: Jacksonville Jaguars at Tennessee Titans – Game summary

Quarter	1	2	3	4	Total
Jaguars	0	7	0	3	10
Titans	3	7	0	7	17

at LP Field, Nashville, Tennessee

- Date: September 7, 2008
- Game time: 12:05 p.m. CDT
- Game weather: 84 °F or 28.9 °C, (Sunny)
- Game attendance: 67,000
- Referee: Tony Corrente
- TV announcers (CBS): Ian Eagle & Solomon Wilcots
- Recap, Game Book

Game information

First quarter

- TEN – Rob Bironas 47-yard field goal, 9:50. Titans 3–0. Drive: 6 plays, 48 yards, 3:22.

Second quarter

- JAX – Greg Jones 1-yard pass from David Garrard (Josh Scobee kick), 10:16. Jaguars 7–3. Drive: 3 plays, 5 yards, 1:19.
- TEN – Chris Johnson 7-yard pass from Vince Young (Rob Bironas kick), 3:09. Titans 10–7. Drive: 7 plays, 75 yards, 3:19.

Third quarter

- No scoring plays.

Fourth quarter

- TEN – LenDale White 1-yard run (Rob Bironas kick), 3:47. Titans 17–7. Drive: 9 plays, 80 yards, 2:10.
- JAX – Josh Scobee 27-yard field goal, 2:12. Titans 17–10. Drive: 7 plays, 45 yards, 1:35.

Top passers

- JAX – David Garrard – 23/35, 215 yards, TD, 2 INT
- TEN – Vince Young – 12/22, 110 yards, TD, 2 INT

Top rushers

- JAX – Fred Taylor – 9 rushes, 18 yards
- TEN – Chris Johnson – 15 rushes, 93 yards

Top receivers

- JAX – Matt Jones – 6 receptions, 80 yards
- TEN – Bo Scaife – 6 receptions, 105 yards

The Titans pulled off an important divisional win behind the strong running of rookie RB Chris Johnson, who rushed for 93 yards in his NFL debut, and the arm of backup quarterback Kerry Collins, who replaced starter Vince Young when he went down late in the 4th quarter. Young had been inconsistent, throwing 1 TD pass to Johnson and 2 INTs. However, Collins moved the ball down field effectively and that drive led to the eventual game-winning touchdown run by LenDale White. Jacksonville trailed for much of the game and couldn't run the ball against a locked in Titans defense, who sacked Jaguars quarterback David Garrard seven times. Both teams' defenses played well but the Titans held on. This game was also significant because the Jaguars, Texans, and Colts (in their debut at Lucas Oil Stadium) lost, so the Titans grabbed first place in the AFC South for the first week of the season, ending a 56-week streak of holding 1st place in the division by the Colts as the team started the season 1–0.

=== Week 2: at Cincinnati Bengals ===
Week Two: Tennessee Titans at Cincinnati Bengals – Game summary

Quarter	1	2	3	4	Total
Titans	0	14	3	7	24
Bengals	0	7	0	0	7

at Paul Brown Stadium, Cincinnati, Ohio

- Date: September 14, 2008
- Game time: 12:02 p.m. CDT
- Game weather: 88 °F or 31.1 °C, (Partly Cloudy)
- Game attendance: 64,450
- Referee: Alberto Riveron (57)
- TV announcers (CBS): Don Criqui & Dan Fouts
- Recap, Game Book

Game information

First quarter

- No scoring plays.

Second quarter

- TEN – LenDale White 1-yard run (Rob Bironas kick), 11:06. Titans 7–0. Drive: 11 plays, 61 yards, 5:37.
- CIN – Chris Perry 13-yard run (Shayne Graham kick), 3:16. Tied 7–7. Drive: 11 plays, 63 yards, 4:39.
- TEN – Justin Gage 11-yard pass from Kerry Collins (Rob Bironas kick), 0:38. Titans 14–7. Drive: 7 plays, 80 yards, 2:38.

Third quarter

- TEN – Rob Bironas 34-yard field goal, 4:49. Titans 17–7. Drive: 10 plays, 56 yards, 5:15.

Fourth quarter

- TEN – Keith Bulluck 0-yard blocked punt return (Rob Bironas kick), 14:05. Titans 24–7.

Top passers

- TEN – Kerry Collins – 14/21, 128 yards, TD
- CIN – Carson Palmer – 16/27, 134 yards, 2 INT

Top rushers

- TEN – Chris Johnson – 19 rushes, 109 yards
- CIN – Chris Perry – 21 rushes, 64 yards, TD

Top receivers

- TEN – Justin Gage – 5 receptions, 59 yards, TD
- CIN – DeDe Dorsey – 2 receptions, 49 yards

The Titans stayed in 1st place thanks to the extremely strong wind from the remnants of Hurricane Ike (which interfered with an important field goal attempt by Shayne Graham) and a sloppy Cincinnati offense in a 24–7 rout. Chris Johnson ran for over 100 yards for the first time in his career and Kerry Collins had a good day filling in for the injured Vince Young. The Titans first scored on a 1-yd TD run by LenDale White after a scoreless 1st quarter and then Cincinnati scored its only touchdown with a Chris Perry 13-yd TD run on 4th down. The Titans, with a little over a minute left, drove the ball downfield and took a 14–7 lead at the half thanks to an 11-yd touchdown reception by Justin Gage. The knockout punch was delivered early in the 4th quarter with the Titans leading 17–7. Keith Bulluck recovered a blocked punt in the endzone to finish off the Bengals and keep the Titans perfect.

The win also gave the Titans a 2–0 start for the first time since 1999.

=== Week 3: vs. Houston Texans ===
Week Three: Houston Texans at Tennessee Titans – Game summary

Quarter	1	2	3	4	Total
Texans	6	6	0	0	12
Titans	7	14	3	7	31

at LP Field, Nashville, Tennessee

- Date: September 21, 2008
- Game time: 12:02 p.m. CDT
- Game weather: 80 °F or 26.7 °C, (Sunny)
- Game attendance: 69,143
- Referee: Jerome Boger (23)
- TV announcers (CBS): Kevin Harlan & Rich Gannon
- Recap, Game Book

Game information

First quarter

- HOU – Kris Brown 44-yard field goal, 12:06. Texans 3–0. Drive: 4 plays, -12 yards, 1:36.
- TEN – LenDale White 2-yard run (Rob Bironas kick), 6:33. Titans 7–3. Drive: 11 plays, 77 yards, 5:33.
- HOU – Kris Brown 24-yard field goal, 3:49. Titans 7–6. Drive: 6 plays, 66 yards, 2:17.

Second quarter

- TEN – Bo Scaife 9-yard pass from Kerry Collins (Rob Bironas kick), 14:46. Titans 14–6. Drive: 10 plays, 68 yards, 4:03.
- HOU – Steve Slaton 6-yard run (kick failed), 8:31. Titans 14–12. Drive: 12 plays, 75 yards, 6:15.
- TEN – LenDale White 1-yard run (Rob Bironas kick), 4:36. Titans 21–12. Drive: 7 plays, 74 yards, 3:55.

Third quarter

- TEN – Rob Bironas 44-yard field goal, 6:36. Titans 24–12. Drive: 5 plays, 34 yards, 1:09.

Fourth quarter

- TEN – Cortland Finnegan 99-yard interception return (Rob Bironas kick), 1:03. Titans 31–12.

Top passers

- HOU – Matt Schaub – 17/37, 188 yards, 3 INT
- TEN – Kerry Collins – 13/25, 185 yards, TD, INT

Top rushers

- HOU – Steve Slaton – 18 rushes, 116 yards, TD
- TEN – Chris Johnson – 16 rushes, 74 yards

Top receivers

- HOU – Owen Daniels – 4 receptions, 71 yards
- TEN – Justin McCareins – 3 receptions, 86 yards

Coming off their road win over the Bengals, the Titans went home for a Week 3 duel with the Houston Texans. In the first quarter, Tennessee trailed early as Houston Texans kicker Kris Brown got a 44-yard field goal. The Titans responded with RB LenDale White getting a 2-yard TD run. Houston drew close as Brown kicked a 24-yard field goal, yet Tennessee answered with QB Kerry Collins completing a 9-yard TD pass to TE Bo Scaife. The Texans replied with RB Steve Slaton getting a 6-yard TD run (with a failed PAT), while the Titans closed out the half with White's 1-yard TD run. In the third quarter, Tennessee increased its lead with kicker Rob Bironas nailing a 44-yard field goal. In the fourth quarter, the Titans closed out the game with CB Cortland Finnegan returning an interception 99 yards for a touchdown.

With the win, Tennessee acquired its first 3–0 start since their Super Bowl run of 1999.

=== Week 4: vs. Minnesota Vikings ===
Quarter	1	2	3	4	Total
Vikings	0	10	0	7	17
Titans	10	10	3	7	30

at LP Field, Nashville, Tennessee

- Game time: 1:00 PM EST
- Game weather: 82 °F or 27.8 °C (Sunny)
- Game attendance: 69,143
- Referee: Peter Morelli
- TV announcers (Fox): Chris Myers, J.C. Pearson, & Nischelle Turner

Coming off their home win over the Texans, the Titans stayed at home for a Week 4 interconference duel with the Minnesota Vikings. In the first quarter, Tennessee drew first blood as kicker Rob Bironas got a 20-yard field goal, along with rookie RB Chris Johnson getting a 1-yard TD run. In the second quarter, the Vikings responded with RB Adrian Peterson getting a 28-yard TD run. Afterwards, the Titans answered with Bironas kicking a 32-yard field goal, along with RB LenDale White getting a 1-yard TD run. Minnesota closed out the half with kicker Ryan Longwell getting a 42-yard field goal.

In the third quarter, Tennessee increased its lead with Bironas nailing a 49-yard field goal. In the fourth quarter, the Vikings tried to rally as Peterson got a 3-yard TD run, yet the Titans pulled away with Johnson getting a 6-yard TD run. The end of the game came with a bad call by the coach, as he elected to punt on 4th down, despite being after the two minute warning, down by two scores and out of time outs. After the Vikings caught a fair catch, they proceeded to take three kneel downs to run out the game clock.

With the win, Tennessee acquired its first 4–0 start in franchise history.

=== Week 5: at Baltimore Ravens ===
Quarter	1	2	3	4	Total
Titans	0	3	0	10	13
Ravens	3	0	7	0	10

at M&T Bank Stadium, Baltimore, Maryland

- Game time: 1:00 PM EST
- Game weather: 69 °F or 20.6 °C (Partly Cloudy)
- Game attendance: 71,131
- Referee: Bill Carollo
- TV announcers (CBS): Ian Eagle & Solomon Wilcots

Coming off their home win over the Vikings, the Titans flew to M&T Bank Stadium for a Week 5 defensive duel with the Baltimore Ravens. In the first quarter, Tennessee trailed early as Ravens kicker Matt Stover got a 38-yard field goal. In the second quarter, the Titans tied the game with kicker Rob Bironas getting a 35-yard field goal. In the third quarter, Baltimore took the lead as RB Le'Ron McClain got a 1-yard TD run. Fortunately, in the fourth quarter, Tennessee rallied with Bironas nailing a 26-yard field goal, along with QB Kerry Collins completing an 11-yard TD pass to TE Alge Crumpler.

With the win, the Titans kept their perfect season alive as they entered their bye week at 5–0. During this bye week, the Titans became the only undefeated team in the NFL with the Giants' loss to the Browns in Week 6.

=== Week 7: at Kansas City Chiefs ===
Quarter	1	2	3	4	Total
Titans	10	7	3	14	34
Chiefs	0	0	0	10	10

at Arrowhead Stadium, Kansas City, Missouri

- Game time: 1:00 PM EST
- Game weather: 63 °F or 17.2 °C (Sunny)
- Game attendance: 74,200
- Referee: Gene Steratore
- TV announcers (CBS): Gus Johnson & Steve Tasker

Coming off their bye week, the Titans flew to Arrowhead Stadium for a Week 7 duel with the Kansas City Chiefs. In the first quarter, Tennessee drew first blood as kicker Rob Bironas got a 49-yard field goal, along with RB LenDale White getting a 6-yard TD run. In the second quarter, the Titans increased their lead as White got a 2-yard TD run. In the third quarter, Tennessee continued its victory march as Bironas got a 46-yard field goal. In the fourth quarter, the Titans ripped it up as White got an 80-yard TD run. The Chiefs would get on the board as kicker Nick Novak nailed a 26-yard field goal, yet Tennessee replied with rookie RB Chris Johnson getting a 66-yard TD run. Kansas City ended the game's scoring with QB Tyler Thigpen getting a 14-yard TD run.

With the win, the Titans stayed perfect at 6–0.

In the game, Tennessee's overall ground game reached a franchise-best 332 yards.

=== Week 8: vs. Indianapolis Colts ===
Quarter	1	2	3	4	Total
Colts	7	0	7	7	21
Titans	3	3	8	17	31

at LP Field, Nashville, Tennessee

- Game time: 8:30 PM EDT
- Game weather: 45 °F or 7.2 °C (Cloudy)
- Game attendance: 69,000
- Referee: Mike Carey
- TV announcers (ESPN): Mike Tirico (play-by-play), Ron Jaworski and Tony Kornheiser (color commentators), Suzy Kolber and Michele Tafoya (sideline reporters)

On Monday Night Football, the Titans responded to the doubters and defeated the Colts for only the fourth time since formation of the AFC South; the final score was 31–21 and came after Indianapolis had been heavily favored to win. Rob Bironas got it started with a field goal but then Peyton Manning found Dallas Clark for a touchdown on the next drive. Bironas pulled the Titans to within one with another field goal, but missed one before the half to keep the Titans behind going into halftime. Manning found Clark once again the 3rd quarter for a 14–6 lead but that would be the last time they would lead as LenDale White scored and Ahmard Hall caught a two-point conversion from Kerry Collins. Bironas hit another field goal to give the Titans the lead for good. Two key interceptions by the Titans put the Colts away as White scored again and rookie Chris Johnson added his fourth rushing touchdown late. Manning would score a rushing touchdown in the final minute but it was too little too late. With the win, the Titans picked up their first 7–0 start in the franchise's entire history, including as the “Oilers”.

During halftime, former Titans Steve McNair, Eddie George, and Frank Wycheck were honored.

=== Week 9: vs. Green Bay Packers ===
Quarter	1	2	3	4	OT	Total
Packers	0	10	3	3	0	16
Titans	3	10	3	0	3	19

at LP Field, Nashville, Tennessee

- Game time: 1:00 p.m. EDT
- Game weather: 73 °F or 22.8 °C (Sunny)
- Game attendance: 67,000
- Referee: Bill Leavy
- TV announcers (Fox): Kenny Albert, Daryl Johnston, & Tony Siragusa

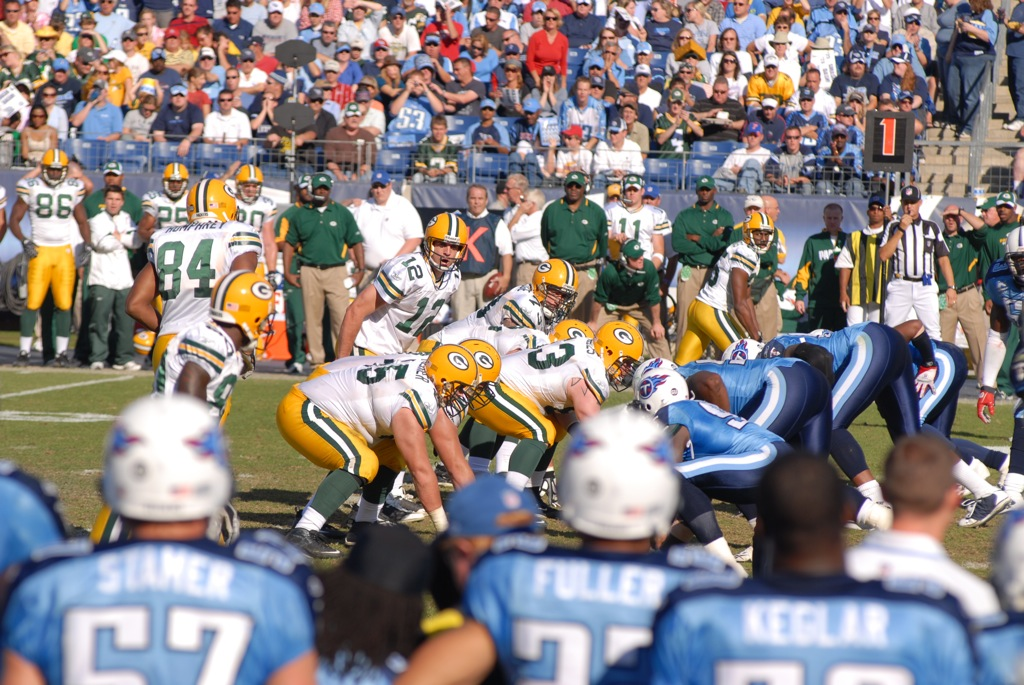
Aaron Rodgers and the Packers on offense at Tennessee, November 2, 2008

The Titans kept their record perfect by edging the Packers 19–16 in OT.

Rob Bironas and Mason Crosby each traded field goals early in the first half and the Titans had a 6–3 edge until Aaron Rodgers hooked up with Donald Driver for a touchdown. Then LenDale White helped drive the ball downfield with 50-yard run that set up Chris Johnson's TD run to make it 13–10.

In the second half, the Packers were able to tie the game with two more Crosby field goals and force it into overtime when Bironas missed a potential game-winning field goal at the end of regulation.

In overtime, Kerry Collins and Johnson helped move the ball down the field for a game-winning 47-yard field goal by Bironas, who made up for his mistake at the end of the 4th.

With the win, the Titans ran their regular season winning streak to 11 games, continued their hottest start in franchise history, and remained the only unbeaten team in the league as they improved to 8–0.

=== Week 10: at Chicago Bears ===
Quarter	1	2	3	4	Total
Titans	0	7	7	7	21
Bears	7	0	0	7	14

at Soldier Field, Chicago, Illinois

- Game time: 1:00 PM EDT / 12:00 PM CDT
- Game weather: 37 °F or 2.8 °C (Cloudy)
- Game attendance: 62,124
- Referee: Ed Hochuli
- TV announcers (CBS): Greg Gumbel & Dan Dierdorf

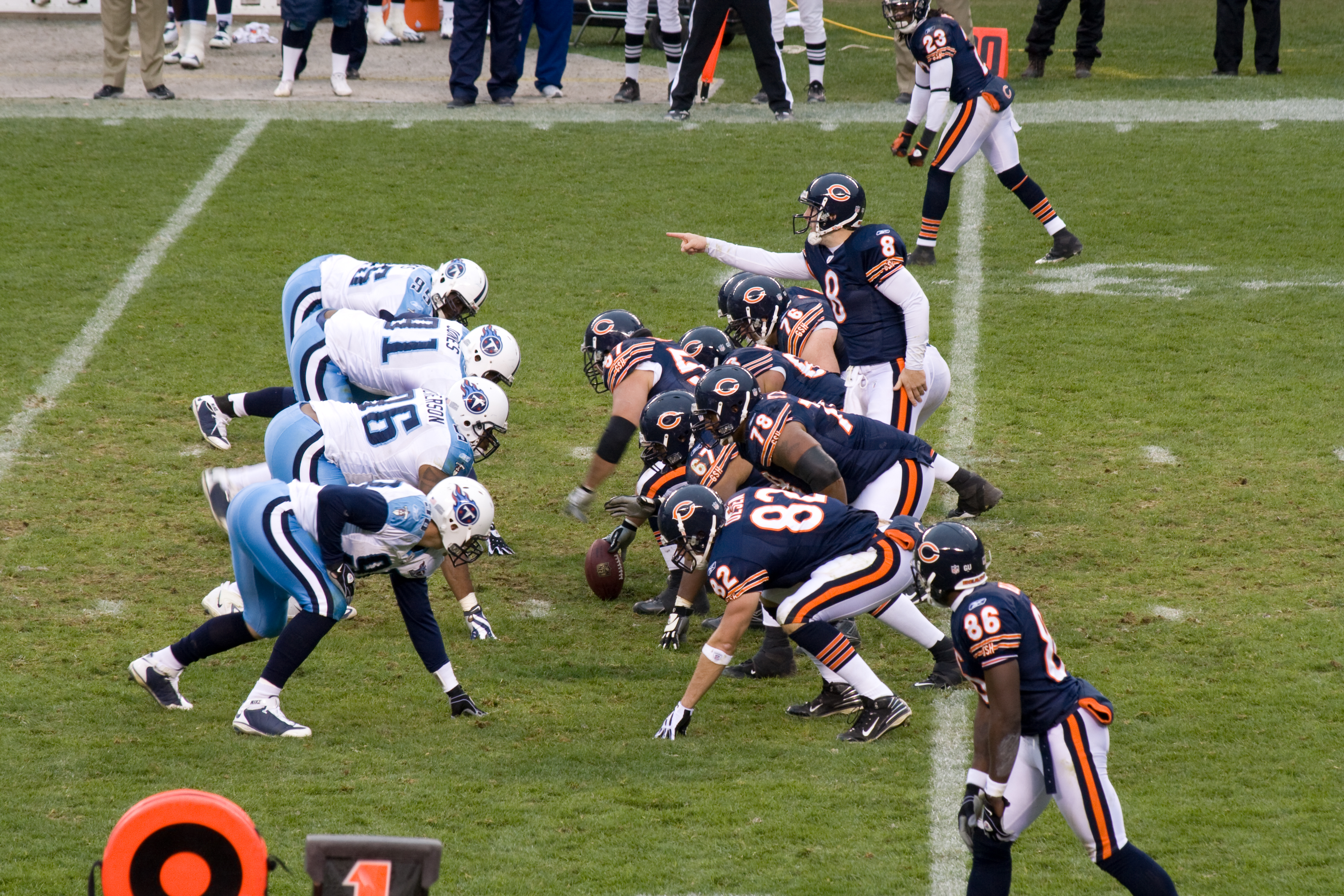
Tennessee on defense at Chicago

Coming off their home win over the Packers, the Titans flew to Soldier Field for a Week 10 interconference duel with the Chicago Bears.

In the first quarter, Tennessee trailed early as Bears QB Rex Grossman completed a 5-yard touchdown pass to RB Matt Forte. In the second quarter, the Titans answered with QB Kerry Collins completing a 10-yard TD pass to TE Bo Scaife.

In the third quarter, Tennessee took the lead as Collins completed a 12-yard TD pass to WR Justin Gage (a former Bear). In the fourth quarter, the Titans increased their lead as RB LenDale White got a 2-yard touchdown run. Chicago tried to rally as Grossman got a 1-yard touchdown run, yet Tennessee's defense stiffened for the win.

With the win, the Titans kept their perfect season alive at 9–0.

=== Week 11: at Jacksonville Jaguars ===
Quarter	1	2	3	4	Total
Titans	3	0	14	7	24
Jaguars	0	14	0	0	14

at Jacksonville Municipal Stadium, Jacksonville, Florida

- Game time: 4:15 PM EDT
- Game weather: 60 °F or 15.6 °C (Mostly Sunny)
- Game attendance: 65,258
- Referee: Walt Coleman
- TV announcers (CBS): Dick Enberg & Randy Cross

Coming off two wins in a row over NFC North Division teams, the Titans continued their road tour to Florida for a Week 11 AFC South rematch with the Jacksonville Jaguars. In the first quarter, Tennessee drew first blood as kicker Rob Bironas nailed a 32-yard field goal. In the second quarter, the Jaguars took the lead as RB Maurice Jones-Drew got a 2-yard and a 1-yard TD run. In the third quarter, the Titans regained the lead as QB Kerry Collins completed a 13-yard TD pass to WR Brandon Jones and a 56-yard TD pass to WR Justin Gage. In the fourth quarter, Tennessee closed out the game as Collins hooked up with Gage again on a 38-yard TD pass.

With the win, the Titans kept their dream season alive, improving to a perfect record of 10–0, sweeping the Jaguars for the first time since 2003.

=== Week 12: vs. New York Jets ===
Quarter	1	2	3	4	Total
Jets	7	3	10	14	34
Titans	0	3	0	10	13

at LP Field, Nashville, Tennessee

- Game time: 1:00 PM EST
- Game weather: 52 °F or 11.1 °C (Cloudy)
- Game attendance: 69,143
- Referee: Carl Cheffers
- TV announcers (CBS): Jim Nantz & Phil Simms

Coming off their season-sweeping road win over the Jaguars, the Titans went home for a Week 12 duel with the New York Jets. In the first quarter, Tennessee trailed early as Jets QB Brett Favre completed a 10-yard TD pass to RB Thomas Jones. In the second quarter, New York increased its lead with kicker Jay Feely getting a 20-yard field goal. The Titans closed out the half with kicker Rob Bironas getting a 43-yard field goal.

In the third quarter, the Jets responded as Feely kicked a 30-yard field goal, while Favre completed a 2-yard TD pass to WR Laveranues Coles. In the fourth quarter, Tennessee tried to rally as Rob Bironas nailed a 49-yard field goal, but New York replied with RB Leon Washington getting a 61-yard TD run. The Titans had one last attempt to keep their perfect season alive as QB Kerry Collins completed a 6-yard TD pass to FB Ahmard Hall. However, Tennessee's perfect season went down the tubes as Washington helped seal things for the Jets on a 4-yard TD run.

With the loss, the Titans fell to 10–1.

=== Week 13: at Detroit Lions ===
Quarter	1	2	3	4	Total
Titans	21	14	6	6	47
Lions	3	7	0	0	10

at Ford Field, Detroit, Michigan

- Game time: 12:30 PM EST
- Game weather: None (Domed Stadium)
- Game attendance: 60,112
- Referee: Jeff Triplette
- TV announcers (CBS): Jim Nantz & Phil Simms

Hoping to rebound from their first loss of the season, the Titans flew to Ford Field for a Week 13 Thanksgiving game against the winless Detroit Lions. In the first quarter, Tennessee drew first blood as rookie RB Chris Johnson got a 6-yard TD run. The Lions would respond with kicker Jason Hanson getting a 53-yard field goal. The Titans would answer with Johnson getting a 58-yard TD run, along with DE Dave Ball returning an interception 15 yards for a touchdown. In the second quarter, Tennessee increased their lead with RB LenDale White getting a 6-yard and a 2-yard TD run. Detroit would reply with QB Daunte Culpepper completing a 2-yard TD pass to TE Michael Gaines.

In the third quarter, kicker Rob Bironas would kick field goals of 41 and 49 yards to put the Titans up by 31, and in the fourth quarter, he would nail field goals of 45 and 43 yards to put the Titans up for good.

With the win, Tennessee not only improved to 11–1 on the season, but the Titans became the only AFC South team to defeat all four NFC North teams in interconference play.

Center Kevin Mawae, DT Albert Haynesworth, and running backs Johnson and White were given CBS's All-Iron Award for their performance.

=== Week 14: vs. Cleveland Browns ===
Quarter	1	2	3	4	Total
Browns	6	0	0	3	9
Titans	0	14	7	7	28

at LP Field, Nashville, Tennessee

- Game time: 1:00 PM EST
- Game weather: 34 °F or 1.1 °C (Sunny)
- Game attendance: 69,143
- Referee: Ron Winter
- TV announcers (CBS): Don Criqui & Dan Fouts

Coming off their Thanksgiving win over the Lions, the Titans came home to face the Cleveland Browns in a Week 14 duel. In the first quarter, Cleveland would jump on top early as Phil Dawson made 47 and 41-yard field goals. Tennessee, however, would answer with a 28-yard pass from Kerry Collins to Ahmard Hall. Then, later in the 2nd quarter, LenDale White found the end zone from 3 yards out to give them a 14–6 lead.

In the third quarter, Kerry Collins found Justin Gage for a 9-yard touchdown and the Titans found themselves in control, leading 21–9 heading into the 4th quarter. Cleveland attempted to make a comeback with Phil Dawson making a 39-yard field goal, but could not finish as Chris Johnson scored from 25 yards out and put the game away for the Titans.

With the win, not only did Tennessee improve to 12–1, but they also clinched their first AFC South title since 2002.

=== Week 15: at Houston Texans ===
Quarter	1	2	3	4	Total
Titans	3	3	3	3	12
Texans	0	10	0	3	13

at Reliant Stadium, Houston, Texas

- Game time: 1:00 PM EST/12:00 PM CST
- Game weather: 72 °F or 22.2 °C (Partly Cloudy/Roof Open)
- Game attendance: 70,831
- Referee: Gene Steratore
- TV announcers (CBS): Gus Johnson & Steve Tasker

With the loss, the Titans fell to 12–2 and their winning streak against the Texans came to an end.

=== Week 16: vs. Pittsburgh Steelers ===
Quarter	1	2	3	4	Total
Steelers	0	7	7	0	14
Titans	0	10	7	14	31

at LP Field, Nashville, Tennessee

- Game time: 1:00 PM EST/12:00 PM CST
- Game weather: 32 °F or 0 °C (Sunny)
- Game attendance: 69,143
- Referee: John Parry
- TV announcers (CBS): Jim Nantz & Phil Simms

Hoping to rebound from their divisional road loss to the Texans, the Titans went home for a crucial Week 16 battle with the Pittsburgh Steelers, with the AFC's top seed on the line.

After a scoreless first quarter, the Titans got the second quarter lead as kicker Rob Bironas got a 42-yard field goal, along with quarterback Kerry Collins completing a 34-yard touchdown pass to wide receiver Justin Gage. The Steelers would respond with quarterback Ben Roethlisberger completing a 31-yard touchdown pass to wide receiver Santonio Holmes. In the third quarter, Pittsburgh took the lead as Roethlisberger completed a 21-yard touchdown pass to wide receiver Hines Ward, yet Tennessee struck back with rookie running back Chris Johnson getting a 21-yard touchdown run. The Titans would then pull away in the fourth quarter with running back LenDale White's 1-yard touchdown run and safety Michael Griffin's 83-yard interception return for a touchdown. This was the first game of the year where the league-leading Steelers defense allowed more than 300 yards of total offense (allowing 332 yards).

With the win, not only did Tennessee improve to 13–2, but also locked up the AFC's #1 seed. This would prove the Titans last win until Week 8 of the 2009 season.

This would also be the last time a team swept both the AFC North and NFC North in the same season until the Dallas Cowboys did so in 2016. (Note: (In intervening seasons the only teams who played both the AFC North and NFC North in the same season were the AFC East in 2010, the NFC South in 2014, the NFC West in 2015, and the AFC West also in 2015.)

=== Week 17: at Indianapolis Colts ===
Quarter	1	2	3	4	Total
Titans	0	0	0	0	0
Colts	10	6	0	7	23

at Lucas Oil Stadium, Indianapolis, Indiana

- Game time: 1:00 PM EST
- Game weather: None (Dome Closed)
- Game attendance: 66,721
- Referee: Tony Corrente
- TV announcers (CBS): Ian Eagle and Solomon Wilcots

With the AFC's #1 seed under their belt, the Titans flew to Lucas Oil Stadium to close out their regular season in a Week 17 AFC South rematch with the Indianapolis Colts. The Titans rested several of their starters for the game including Chris Johnson and benched Kerry Collins early. Tennessee trailed early in the first quarter as Colts quarterback Peyton Manning completed a 55-yard touchdown pass to running back Joseph Addai followed by kicker Adam Vinatieri's 28-yard field goal. The Titans' deficit would increase in the second quarter as Vinatieri nailed a 21-yard and a 38-yard field goal. After a scoreless third quarter, Indianapolis closed out the game in the fourth quarter as center Jamey Richard recovered a fumble within Tennessee's endzone for a touchdown.

With the loss, the Titans ended the regular season at 13–3. This would become the beginning of an eight-game losing streak for the Titans.

== Playoffs ==
=== AFC Divisional Round: vs. Baltimore Ravens ===
Quarter	1	2	3	4	Total
Ravens	7	0	0	6	13
Titans	7	0	0	3	10

at LP Field, Nashville, Tennessee

- Game time: 4:30 PM EST
- Game weather: 43 °F or 6.1 °C (Cloudy)
- Game attendance: 69,143
- Referee: Terry McAulay
- TV announcers (CBS): Greg Gumbel and Dan Dierdorf

Entering the postseason as the AFC's top seed, the Titans began their postseason run at home in the AFC Divisional round against the #6 Baltimore Ravens, in a rematch of their Week 5 contest.

Matt Stover kicked a 43-yard field goal with 57 seconds remaining to send the Ravens into the AFC Championship Game at the expense of the Titans, as quarterback Joe Flacco became the first rookie quarterback to win two playoff games in a single postseason. Tennessee turned the ball over three times, which proved to be the difference between the two teams, as Baltimore never gave the ball away.

The Titans took the lead on their second drive of the game with Kerry Collins completing a 28-yard pass to rookie running back Chris Johnson and a 20-yarder to Justin Gage before Johnson finished the drive with an 8-yard touchdown run. But the Ravens answered back with a 48-yard touchdown Flacco pass to former Titan Derrick Mason.

Early in the second quarter, Tennessee drove to the Ravens 25-yard line, only to turn the ball over on downs due to a fumbled snap on a fourth down conversion attempt. Then after forcing a punt, their drive to the Ravens 32-yard line also ended with no points when a pass from Collins was picked off by former Titan Samari Rolle. Following another punt, the Titans moved the ball into scoring range for the third time in a row, this time driving to the Baltimore 22. But once again they came up empty after LenDale White's fumble was recovered by Ravens safety Jim Leonhard with 25 seconds left in the half.

In the second half, a 29-yard punt return by Leonard and a 37-yard reception by Mark Clayton set up a Stover field goal to take a 10–7 lead. Meanwhile, the Titans failed to score again, as Rob Bironas missed a 51-yard field goal and after Stover's field goal, and Ravens cornerback Fabian Washington forced and recovered a fumble from tight end Alge Crumpler on Baltimore's 1-yard line.

However, the Ravens were unable to gain any yards with their ensuing drive and Tennessee got the ball back with great field position at the Ravens 42-yard line. This time, they managed to drive to the 10-yard line and score with a Bironas field goal to tie the game at 10.

Two plays after the ensuing kickoff, Baltimore faced 3rd down and 2. On the next play, the play clock appeared to expire before the snap, but no penalty flag was thrown and Flacco ended up completing a 23-yard pass to Todd Heap. Five plays later, Stover's 43-yard field goal gave the Ravens a 13–10 lead with 53 seconds left. Baltimore's defense then sealed the victory by forcing Tennessee to turn the ball over on downs on their own 40-yard line.
