= 2011 Tennessee Titans season =

52nd season in franchise history

- Owner: Bud Adams
- General manager: Mike Reinfeldt
- Head coach: Mike Munchak
- Home stadium: LP Field

Results
- Record: 9–7
- Division place: 2nd AFC South
- Playoffs: Did not qualify

The 2011 season was the Tennessee Titans' 42nd in the National Football League (NFL), their 52nd overall and their 15th in the state of Tennessee. It was also their first season under head coach Mike Munchak, replacing longtime head coach Jeff Fisher, who resigned on January 27 after 17 seasons. The team improved on their 6–10 record from 2010 and finished tied with the Cincinnati Bengals for the last playoff spot, but lost the tiebreaker due to their 24–17 loss to the Bengals in Week 9, missing the playoffs for a third consecutive season.

== Offseason ==
=== 2011 draft class ===
Round	Selection	Player	Position	College
1	8	Jake Locker	QB	Washington
2	39	Akeem Ayers	LB	UCLA
3	77	Jurrell Casey	DT	USC
4	109	Colin McCarthy	LB	Miami (FL)
5	142	Karl Klug	DE	Iowa
6	175	Byron Stingily	T	Louisville
7	212	Zach Clayton	DT	Auburn

== Coaching staff ==
2011 Tennessee Titans staff
Front office: Founder/owner/chairman/president/CEO – Bud Adams; Executive vice president/general manager – Mike Reinfeldt; Vice president of player personnel – Ruston Webster; Vice president of football operations – Lake Dawson; Vice president of football administration – Vincent Marino; Head coaches: Head coach – Mike Munchak; Offensive coaches: Offensive coordinator – Chris Palmer; Quarterbacks/pass game coordinator – Dowell Loggains; Running backs – Jim Skipper; Wide receivers – Dave Ragone; Tight ends – John Zernhelt; Offensive line – Bruce Matthews; Offensive line assistant – Art Valero; Offensive assistant/quality control – Charles London	Defensive coaches: Defensive coordinator – Jerry Gray; Defensive line – Tracy Rocker; Linebackers – Frank Bush; Secondary – Marcus Robertson; Secondary assistant – Curtis Fuller; Senior assistant – Dave McGinnis; Defensive assistant/quality control – Arthur Smith; Special teams coaches: Special teams – Alan Lowry; Special teams assistant – Chet Parlavecchio; Strength and Conditioning Coaches: Assistant head coach/strength and conditioning – Steve Watterson

== Final roster ==
2011 Tennessee Titans roster
Quarterbacks (QB): 8 Matt Hasselbeck; 10 Jake Locker; 11 Rusty Smith; Running backs (RB): 45 Ahmard Hall; 23 Jamie Harper; 28 Chris Johnson; 44 Quinn Johnson; Wide receivers (WR): 82 Donnie Avery; 87 Lavelle Hawkins; 83 Marc Mariani RS; 85 Nate Washington; 17 Damian Williams; Tight ends (TE): 89 Jared Cook; 86 Daniel Graham; 88 Craig Stevens	Offensive linemen (OL): 54 Eugene Amano C; 64 Leroy Harris G; 60 Kevin Matthews C; 66 Mike Otto T; 71 Michael Roos T; 73 Jake Scott G; 76 David Stewart T; 68 Byron Stingily T; 61 Fernando Velasco C/G; Defensive linemen (DL): 98 Dave Ball DE; 99 Jurrell Casey DT; 69 Zach Clayton DT; 95 William Hayes DE; 91 Jason Jones DE; 97 Karl Klug DT; 94 Sen'Derrick Marks DT; 90 Derrick Morgan DE; 96 Malcolm Sheppard DT; 93 Shaun Smith DT	Linebackers (LB): 56 Akeem Ayers OLB; 57 Patrick Bailey OLB; 52 Colin McCarthy MLB; 51 Gerald McRath OLB; 50 Kevin Malast MLB; 59 Tim Shaw OLB; 92 Will Witherspoon OLB; Defensive backs (DB): 26 Jordan Babineaux SS; 37 Tommie Campbell CB; 31 Cortland Finnegan CB; 33 Michael Griffin FS; 35 Chris Hawkins CB; 24 Chris Hope SS; 32 Robert Johnson FS; 30 Jason McCourty CB; 20 Alterraun Verner CB; Special teams (ST): 58 Ken Amato LS; 2 Rob Bironas K; 6 Brett Kern P	Practice squad: 36 Herb Donaldson RB; 77 Ryan Durand G; 79 Pannel Egboh DE; 80 Cameron Graham TE; 19 James Kirkendoll WR; 70 Troy Kropog T; 14 Michael Preston WR; 22 Terrence Wheatley CB; Reserve: 18 Kenny Britt WR (IR); 29 Ryan Mouton CB (IR); 15 O.J. Murdock WR (IR); 21 Javon Ringer RB (IR); 55 Barrett Ruud MLB (IR); 25 Anthony Smith FS (IR); Rookies in italics 53 active, 6 reserve, 8 practice squad

== Preseason ==
=== Schedule ===
The Titans' preseason schedule was announced on April 12, 2011.

Week	Date	Opponent	Result	Record	Venue	Recap
1	August 13	Minnesota Vikings	W 14–3	1–0	LP Field	Recap
2	August 20	at St. Louis Rams	L 16–17	1–1	Edward Jones Dome	Recap
3	August 27	Chicago Bears	W 14–13	2–1	LP Field	Recap
4	September 1	at New Orleans Saints	W 32–9	3–1	Louisiana Superdome	Recap

== Regular season ==
=== Schedule ===
Week	Date	Opponent	Result	Record	Venue	Recap
1	September 11	at Jacksonville Jaguars	L 14–16	0–1	EverBank Field	Recap
2	September 18	Baltimore Ravens	W 26–13	1–1	LP Field	Recap
3	September 25	Denver Broncos	W 17–14	2–1	LP Field	Recap
4	October 2	at Cleveland Browns	W 31–13	3–1	Cleveland Browns Stadium	Recap
5	October 9	at Pittsburgh Steelers	L 17–38	3–2	Heinz Field	Recap
6	Bye					
7	October 23	Houston Texans	L 7–41	3–3	LP Field	Recap
8	October 30	Indianapolis Colts	W 27–10	4–3	LP Field	Recap
9	November 6	Cincinnati Bengals	L 17–24	4–4	LP Field	Recap
10	November 13	at Carolina Panthers	W 30–3	5–4	Bank of America Stadium	Recap
11	November 20	at Atlanta Falcons	L 17–23	5–5	Georgia Dome	Recap
12	November 27	Tampa Bay Buccaneers	W 23–17	6–5	LP Field	Recap
13	December 4	at Buffalo Bills	W 23–17	7–5	Ralph Wilson Stadium	Recap
14	December 11	New Orleans Saints	L 17–22	7–6	LP Field	Recap
15	December 18	at Indianapolis Colts	L 13–27	7–7	Lucas Oil Stadium	Recap
16	December 24	Jacksonville Jaguars	W 23–17	8–7	LP Field	Recap
17	January 1	at Houston Texans	W 23–22	9–7	Reliant Stadium	Recap

=== Game summaries ===
==== Week 1: at Jacksonville Jaguars ====
Week One: Tennessee Titans at Jacksonville Jaguars – Game summary

Quarter	1	2	3	4	Total
Titans	0	0	7	7	14
Jaguars	7	3	3	3	16

at EverBank Field, Jacksonville, Florida

- Date: September 11
- Game time: 1:00 p.m. EDT/12:00 p.m. CDT
- Game weather: 90° F (Rain Clouds)
- Game attendance: 61,619
- Referee: Mike Carey
- TV announcers (CBS): Ian Eagle and Dan Fouts

Game information

First quarter

Second quarter

Third quarter

Fourth quarter

Top passers

- TEN – Matt Hasselbeck – 21/34, 263 yards, 2 TD, 1 INT
- JAC – Luke McCown – 17/24, 175 yards

Top rushers

- TEN – Chris Johnson – 9 rushes, 24 yards
- JAC – Maurice Jones-Drew – 24 rushes, 97 yards, 1 TD

Top receivers

- TEN – Kenny Britt – 5 receptions, 136 yards, 2 TD
- JAC – Mike Thomas – 8 receptions, 55 yards

Top tacklers

- TEN – Barrett Ruud – 8 tackles, 6 assists
- JAC – Dawan Landry – 6 tackles, 2 assists

==== Week 2: vs. Baltimore Ravens ====
Week Two: Baltimore Ravens at Tennessee Titans – Game summary

Quarter	1	2	3	4	Total
Ravens	0	10	0	3	13
Titans	0	10	10	6	26

at LP Field, Nashville, Tennessee

- Date: September 18
- Game time: 12:00 p.m. CDT
- Game weather: 81 °F (27 °C) (Mostly Cloudy)
- Game attendance: 69,143
- Referee: Clete Blakeman
- TV announcers (CBS): Bill Macatee and Steve Tasker

Game information

First quarter

Second quarter

Third quarter

Fourth quarter

Top passers

- BAL – Joe Flacco
- TEN – Matt Hasselbeck

Top rushers

- BAL – Ray Rice
- TEN – Chris Johnson

Top receivers

- BAL – Ray Rice
- TEN – Kenny Britt

Top tacklers

- BAL – Lardarius Webb
- TEN – Dave Ball

==== Week 3: vs. Denver Broncos ====
Week Three: Denver Broncos at Tennessee Titans – Game summary

Quarter	1	2	3	4	Total
Broncos	7	0	7	0	14
Titans	0	10	0	7	17

at LP Field, Nashville, Tennessee

- Date: September 25
- Game time: 12:00 p.m. CDT
- Game weather: 78 °F (26 °C) (Sunny)
- Game attendance: 69,143
- Referee: John Parry
- TV announcers (CBS): Bill Macatee and Steve Tasker

Game information

First quarter

Second quarter

Third quarter

Fourth quarter

Top passers

- DEN –
- TEN –

Top rushers

- DEN –
- TEN –

Top receivers

- DEN –
- TEN –

Top tacklers

- DEN –
- TEN –

==== Week 4: at Cleveland Browns ====
Week Four: Tennessee Titans at Cleveland Browns – Game summary

Quarter	1	2	3	4	Total
Titans	7	14	10	0	31
Browns	3	3	0	7	13

at Cleveland Browns Stadium, Cleveland, Ohio

- Date: October 2
- Game time: 1:00 p.m. EDT/12:00 p.m. CDT
- Game weather: 48 °F (9 °C) (Cloudy)
- Game attendance: 66,240
- Referee: Pete Morelli
- TV announcers (CBS): Marv Albert and Rich Gannon

Game information

First quarter

Second quarter

Third quarter

Fourth quarter

Top passers

- TEN –
- CLE –

Top rushers

- TEN –
- CLE –

Top receivers

- TEN –
- CLE –

Top tacklers

- TEN –
- CLE –

==== Week 5: at Pittsburgh Steelers ====
Week Five: Tennessee Titans at Pittsburgh Steelers – Game summary

Quarter	1	2	3	4	Total
Titans	3	0	7	7	17
Steelers	7	14	7	10	38

at Heinz Field, Pittsburgh, Pennsylvania

- Date: October 9
- Game time: 1:00 p.m. EDT/12:00 p.m. CDT
- Game weather: 70 °F (21 °C) (Sunny)
- Game attendance: 63,875
- Referee: Walt Anderson
- TV announcers (CBS): Greg Gumbel and Dan Dierdorf

Game information

First quarter

Second quarter

Third quarter

Fourth quarter

Top passers

- TEN – Matt Hasselbeck – 29/49, 262 Yards, 1 TD, 1 INT
- PIT – Ben Roethlisberger – 24/34, 228 Yards, 5 TD, 1 INT

Top rushers

- TEN – Chris Johnson – 14 Rushes, 51 Yards, 1 TD
- PIT – Jonathan Dwyer – 11 Rushes, 107 Yards

Top receivers

- TEN – Nate Washington – 5 Receptions, 69 Yards
- PIT – Mike Wallace – 6 Receptions, 82 Yards, 1 TD

Top tacklers

- TEN – Jason McCourty – 8 tackles, 6 assists
- PIT – James Farrior – 9 tackles, 4 assists

Coming off their road win over the Browns, the Titans flew to Heinz Field for a Week 5 intraconference duel with the Pittsburgh Steelers. Tennessee threw the game's opening punch in the first quarter with a 29-yard field goal from kicker Rob Bironas, but the Steelers answered with quarterback Ben Roethlisberger completing an 8-yard touchdown pass to tight end Heath Miller. Pittsburgh added onto their lead in the second with Roethlisberger completing a 7-yard touchdown pass to wide receiver Hines Ward and a 1-yard touchdown pass to fullback David Johnson.

The Steelers continued their dominating performance in the third quarter with Roethlisberger completing a 5-yard touchdown pass to Ward. The Titans would respond with a 1-yard touchdown run from running back Chris Johnson, yet Pittsburgh came right back in the fourth quarter with kicker Shaun Suisham getting a 19-yard field goal. Tennessee tried to rally as quarterback Matt Hasselbeck found wide receiver Damian Williams on a 19-yard touchdown pass, but the Steelers closed out the game with Roethlisberger completing a 40-yard touchdown pass to wide receiver Mike Wallace.

With the loss, the Titans fell to 3–2.

==== Week 7: vs. Houston Texans ====
Week Seven: Houston Texans at Tennessee Titans – Game summary

Quarter	1	2	3	4	Total
Texans	3	17	7	14	41
Titans	0	0	7	0	7

at LP Field, Nashville, Tennessee

- Date: October 23
- Game time: 12:00 p.m. CDT
- Game weather: 68 °F (20 °C) (Mostly Cloudy)
- Game attendance: 69,143
- Referee: Terry McAulay
- TV announcers (CBS): Marv Albert and Rich Gannon

Game information

First quarter

Second quarter

Third quarter

Fourth quarter

Top passers

- HOU – Matt Schaub
- TEN – Matt Hasselbeck

Top rushers

- HOU – Arian Foster
- TEN – Javon Ringer

Top receivers

- HOU – Arian Foster
- TEN – Chris Johnson

Top tacklers

- HOU – Brian Cushing
- TEN – Jason McCourty

==== Week 8: vs. Indianapolis Colts ====
Week Eight: Indianapolis Colts at Tennessee Titans – Game summary

Quarter	1	2	3	4	Total
Colts	0	0	3	7	10
Titans	3	17	0	7	27

at LP Field, Nashville, Tennessee

- Date: October 30
- Game time: 12:00 p.m. CDT
- Game weather: 62 °F (17 °C) (Mostly Cloudy)
- Game attendance: 69,143
- Referee: Jerome Boger
- TV announcers (CBS): Kevin Harlan and Solomon Wilcots

Game information

First quarter

Second quarter

Third quarter

Fourth quarter

Top passers

- IND – Curtis Painter 26/49 250 yards, 2 INT
- TEN – Matt Hasselbeck 23/33 224 yards, 1 TD

Top rushers

- IND – Curtis Painter 7 carries, 79 yards
- TEN – Javon Ringer 14 carries, 60 yards

Top receivers

- IND – Pierre Garcon 7 catches, 66 yards
- TEN – Nate Washington 4 catches, 34 yards, 1 TD

Top tacklers

- IND – Pat Angerer —10 tackles
- TEN – Jason McCourty and Cortland Finnegan —7 tackles

==== Week 9: vs. Cincinnati Bengals ====
Week Nine: Cincinnati Bengals at Tennessee Titans – Game summary

Quarter	1	2	3	4	Total
Bengals	0	7	7	10	24
Titans	3	14	0	0	17

at LP Field, Nashville, Tennessee

- Date: November 6
- Game time: 3:05 p.m. CST
- Game weather: 63 °F (17 °C) (Sunny)
- Game attendance: 69,143
- Referee: Jeff Triplette
- TV announcers (CBS): Marv Albert & Rich Gannon

Game information

First quarter

Second quarter

Third quarter

Fourth quarter

Top passers

- CIN –
- TEN –

Top rushers

- CIN –
- TEN –

Top receivers

- CIN –
- TEN –

Top tacklers

- CIN –
- TEN –

==== Week 10: at Carolina Panthers ====
Week Ten: Tennessee Titans at Carolina Panthers – Game summary

Quarter	1	2	3	4	Total
Titans	14	3	3	10	30
Panthers	0	0	3	0	3

at Bank of America Stadium, Charlotte, North Carolina

- Date: November 13
- Game time: 1:00 p.m. EST/12:00 p.m. CST
- Game weather: 57 °F (14 °C) (Cloudy)
- Game attendance: 72,409
- Referee: Walt Coleman
- TV announcers (CBS): Kevin Harlan & Solomon Wilcots

Game information

First quarter

Second quarter

Third quarter

Fourth quarter

Top passers

- TEN –
- CAR –

Top rushers

- TEN –
- CAR –

Top receivers

- TEN –
- CAR –

Top tacklers

- TEN –
- CAR –

==== Week 11: at Atlanta Falcons ====
Week Eleven: Tennessee Titans at Atlanta Falcons – Game summary

Quarter	1	2	3	4	Total
Titans	0	3	7	7	17
Falcons	7	6	10	0	23

at Georgia Dome, Atlanta, Georgia

- Date: November 20
- Game time: 4:15 p.m. EST/3:15 p.m. CST
- Game weather: Played indoors (dome stadium)
- Game attendance: 68,164
- Referee: John Parry
- TV announcers (CBS): Ian Eagle and Dan Fouts

Game information

First quarter

Second quarter

Third quarter

Fourth quarter

Top passers

- TEN –
- ATL –

Top rushers

- TEN –
- ATL –

Top receivers

- TEN –
- ATL –

Top tacklers

- TEN –
- ATL –

==== Week 12: vs. Tampa Bay Buccaneers ====
Week Twelve: Tampa Bay Buccaneers at Tennessee Titans – Game summary

Quarter	1	2	3	4	Total
Buccaneers	3	7	7	0	17
Titans	7	3	0	13	23

at LP Field, Nashville, Tennessee

- Date: November 27
- Game time: 12:00 p.m. CST
- Game weather: 44 °F (7 °C) (Rain)
- Game attendance: 69,143
- Referee: Bill Leavy
- TV announcers (Fox): Dick Stockton, John Lynch and Jennifer Hale

Game information

First quarter

Second quarter

Third quarter

Fourth quarter

Top passers

- TB – Josh Freeman – 18/33, 199 yards, 1 touchdown, 1 interception
- TEN – Matt Hasselbeck – 19/34, 160 yards, 1 touchdown, 2 interceptions

Top rushers

- TB – LeGarrette Blount – 20 rushes, 103 yards
- TEN – Chris Johnson – 23 rushes, 190 yards

Top receivers

- TB – Mike Williams – 6 receptions, 84 yards, 1 touchdown
- TEN – Lavelle Hawkins – 5 receptions, 51 yards

Top tacklers

- TB – Ronde Barber – 6 tackles, 1 assist
- TEN – Colin McCarthy – 7 tackles, 3 assists

==== Week 13: at Buffalo Bills ====
Week Thirteen: Tennessee Titans at Buffalo Bills – Game summary

Quarter	1	2	3	4	Total
Titans	10	7	3	3	23
Bills	7	3	0	7	17

at Ralph Wilson Stadium, Orchard Park, New York

- Date: December 4
- Game time: 1:00 p.m. EST/12:00 p.m. CST
- Game weather: 57 °F (14 °C) (Mostly Cloudy)
- Game attendance: 56,463
- Referee: Alberto Riveron
- TV announcers (CBS): Spero Dedes and Steve Beuerlein

Game information

First quarter

Second quarter

Third quarter

Fourth quarter

Top passers

- TEN –
- BUF –

Top rushers

- TEN –
- BUF –

Top receivers

- TEN –
- BUF –

Top tacklers

- TEN –
- BUF –

==== Week 14: vs. New Orleans Saints ====
Week Fourteen: New Orleans Saints at Tennessee Titans – Game summary

Quarter	1	2	3	4	Total
Saints	3	3	3	13	22
Titans	0	3	7	7	17

at LP Field, Nashville, Tennessee

- Date: December 11
- Game time: 12:00 p.m. CST
- Game weather: 45 °F (7 °C) (Sunny)
- Game attendance: 69,143
- Referee: Mike Carey
- TV announcers (Fox): Joe Buck, Troy Aikman, & Pam Oliver

Game information

First quarter

Second quarter

Third quarter

Fourth quarter

Top passers

- NO –
- TEN –

Top rushers

- NO –
- TEN –

Top receivers

- NO –
- TEN –

Top tacklers

- NO –
- TEN –

==== Week 15: at Indianapolis Colts ====
Week Fifteen: Tennessee Titans at Indianapolis Colts – Game summary

Quarter	1	2	3	4	Total
Titans	0	6	0	7	13
Colts	3	0	14	10	27

at Lucas Oil Stadium, Indianapolis, Indiana

- Date: December 18
- Game time: 1:00 p.m. EST/12:00 p.m. CST
- Game weather: Played indoors (retractable roof closed)
- Game attendance: 64,271
- Referee: Pete Morelli
- TV announcers (CBS): Ian Eagle and Dan Fouts

Game information

First quarter

Second quarter

Third quarter

Fourth quarter

Top passers

- TEN –
- IND –

Top rushers

- TEN –
- IND –

Top receivers

- TEN –
- IND –

Top tacklers

- TEN –
- IND –

==== Week 16: vs. Jacksonville Jaguars ====
Week Sixteen: Jacksonville Jaguars at Tennessee Titans – Game summary

Quarter	1	2	3	4	Total
Jaguars	7	3	0	7	17
Titans	10	7	3	3	23

at LP Field, Nashville, Tennessee

- Date: December 24
- Game time: 12:00 p.m. CST
- Game weather: 47 °F (8 °C) (Partly Cloudy)
- Game attendance: 69,143
- Referee: Gene Steratore
- TV announcers (CBS): Bill Macatee and Steve Tasker

Game information

First quarter

Second quarter

Third quarter

Fourth quarter

Top passers

- JAC –
- TEN –

Top rushers

- JAC –
- TEN –

Top receivers

- JAC –
- TEN –

Top tacklers

- JAC –
- TEN –

With the win the Titans improved to 8–7. In order to secure a playoff spot the Tennessee Titans need a win at Houston in Week 17, combined with a Bengals loss, a Broncos win, and Raiders win. If either Cincinnati wins against Baltimore or Denver loses against Kansas City, the Titans will be eliminated from postseason contention.

==== Week 17: at Houston Texans ====
Week Seventeen: Tennessee Titans at Houston Texans – Game summary

Quarter	1	2	3	4	Total
Titans	0	13	3	7	23
Texans	7	3	3	9	22

at Reliant Stadium, Houston, Texas

- Date: January 1
- Game time: 12:00 p.m. CST
- Game attendance: 71,512
- Referee: Ron Winter
- TV announcers (CBS): Bill Macatee & Steve Tasker

Game information

First quarter

Second quarter

Third quarter

Fourth quarter

Top passers

- TEN –
- HOU –

Top rushers

- TEN –
- HOU –

Top receivers

- TEN –
- HOU –

Top tacklers

- TEN –
- HOU –

With the win, the Titans finished the season 9–7 and would secure their first winning season since 2008. However, they were eliminated from postseason contention due to the Denver Broncos losing against the Kansas City Chiefs 7–3.

=== Standings ===
AFC South
	W	L	T	PCT	DIV	CONF	PF	PA	STK
^{(3)} Houston Texans	10	6	0	.625	4–2	8–4	381	278	L3
Tennessee Titans	9	7	0	.563	3–3	7–5	325	317	W2
Jacksonville Jaguars	5	11	0	.313	3–3	4–8	243	329	W1
Indianapolis Colts	2	14	0	.125	2–4	2–10	243	430	L1
