= Jason Jones (defensive end) =

American football player (born 1986)

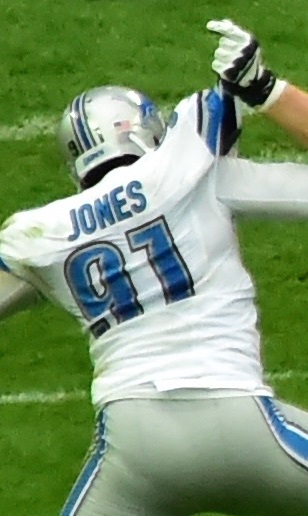
- Jones with the Detroit Lions in 2014

No. 90, 91, 98
- Position: Defensive end

Personal information
- Born: May 23, 1986 (age 40); Detroit, Michigan, U.S.
- Listed height: 6 ft 5 in (1.96 m)
- Listed weight: 272 lb (123 kg)

Career information
- High school: Lathrup (Southfield, Michigan)
- College: Eastern Michigan (2004–2007)
- NFL draft: 2008: 2nd round, 54th overall pick

Career history
- Tennessee Titans (2008–2011); Seattle Seahawks (2012); Detroit Lions (2013–2015); Miami Dolphins (2016); New Orleans Saints (2017)*
- * Offseason or practice squad member only

Awards and highlights
- PFWA All-Rookie Team (2008); First-team All-MAC (2007)

Career NFL statistics
- Total tackles: 211
- Sacks: 31.5
- Forced fumbles: 10
- Fumble recoveries: 2
- Stats at Pro Football Reference

Jason Duane Jones (born May 23, 1986) is an American former professional football player who was a defensive end in the National Football League (NFL). He played college football for the Eastern Michigan Eagles and was selected by the Tennessee Titans in the second round of the 2008 NFL draft. He was also a member of the Seattle Seahawks, Detroit Lions, Miami Dolphins, and New Orleans Saints.

== Early life ==
Jones attended Southfield-Lathrup High School in Lathrup Village, Michigan and enjoyed an outstanding prep career as a football and basketball player. He was named first-team All-Oakland Athletic Association as a senior, recording 27 tackles, six sacks, four forced fumbles and seven interceptions, three of which were returned for touchdowns. He also caught 25 passes for 395 yards and eight touchdowns as a receiver. The Detroit News named him the 44th-best player on the Blue Chip list in the state of Michigan, as he also added All-Metro North honors. Jones is the younger brother of retired American Professional Basketball Player Brian LaWan Alexander. Also, Jones older brother, Michael, played football at Alabama State and other brother, Jamar, works at the White House as a Secret Service uniformed police officer.

== College career ==
Jones played college football for Eastern Michigan University. As a senior (2007), Jones received third-team All-American and first-team All-Mid-American Conference honors. He played in all 12 games with 11 starts and finished fourth on the team with 70 tackles. He tied for seventh in the NCAA with a career-high 19.5 stops for losses. He added 10 quarterback pressures, a fumble recovery and a forced fumble while breaking up three passes and blocking a kick. Selected to play in the 2008 Senior Bowl All-Star Game and finished with three tackles, one sack for 14 yards and one forced fumble. Jones was named the recipient of the Harold E. Sponberg Award as the team's top down lineman scholar-athlete.

== Professional career ==
=== Tennessee Titans ===
Jones was selected in the second round (54th overall) by the Tennessee Titans in the 2008 NFL draft. He started against the Pittsburgh Steelers in week 16 of the 2008 season as a result of injuries to Albert Haynesworth and Kyle Vanden Bosch. In thirteen games during the regular season, Jones totaled 31 tackles and 5 sacks. He was particularly impressive in his week 16 game against the Steelers when his 3.5 sacks, 5 tackles, and 3 forced fumbles made him a candidate for Defensive Player of the Week. Jones got ejected from a Week 2 game versus the Houston Texans. Jones was placed on injured reserve on December 9, 2009 due to a shoulder injury.

=== Seattle Seahawks ===
On March 17, 2012, Jones signed a one-year deal with the Seattle Seahawks.

=== Detroit Lions ===
On March 13, 2013, Jones signed a three-year deal with the Detroit Lions. On September 22, 2013 (Week 3 of the 2013 NFL Season), Jones suffered a season ending knee injury.

=== Miami Dolphins ===
Jones had signed a one-year deal with the Miami Dolphins on May 13, 2016. He was suspended for two games on November 21, 2016 for violating the NFL Policy and Program for Substances of Abuse. On January 6, 2017, Jones was released by the Dolphins.

=== New Orleans Saints ===
On August 12, 2017, Jones was signed by the New Orleans Saints. On August 29, 2017, he was released by the Saints.

== NFL career statistics ==
Legend
**Bold**	Career high

=== Regular season ===
Year	Team	Games		Tackles					Interceptions					Fumbles			
Year	Team	GP	GS	Cmb	Solo	Ast	Sck	TFL	Int	Yds	TD	Lng	PD	FF	FR	Yds	TD
2008	TEN	13	3	31	24	7	**5.0**	6	0	0	0	0	2	**3**	0	0	0
2009	TEN	7	0	15	9	6	4.0	5	0	0	0	0	**5**	0	0	0	0
2010	TEN	15	15	**38**	**33**	5	3.5	**12**	0	0	0	0	3	**3**	0	0	0
2011	TEN	14	13	27	18	9	3.0	4	0	0	0	0	**5**	1	0	0	0
2012	SEA	12	0	10	7	3	3.0	2	0	0	0	0	4	0	**1**	**3**	0
2013	DET	3	3	1	1	0	0.0	0	0	0	0	0	1	0	0	0	0
2014	DET	**16**	**16**	22	14	8	**5.0**	5	0	0	0	0	3	2	0	0	0
2015	DET	15	15	31	27	4	4.5	7	0	0	0	0	1	1	0	0	0
2016	MIA	14	5	36	22	**14**	3.5	3	0	0	0	0	2	0	**1**	0	0
		109	70	211	155	56	31.5	44	0	0	0	0	26	10	2	3	0

=== Playoffs ===
Year	Team	Games		Tackles					Interceptions					Fumbles			
Year	Team	GP	GS	Cmb	Solo	Ast	Sck	TFL	Int	Yds	TD	Lng	PD	FF	FR	Yds	TD
2008	TEN	**1**	0	2	1	**1**	0.0	0	0	0	0	0	0	0	0	0	0
2014	DET	**1**	**1**	**3**	**3**	0	0.0	0	0	0	0	0	0	0	0	0	0
		2	1	5	4	1	0.0	0	0	0	0	0	0	0	0	0	0

== Charity work ==
Jones is affiliated with the 501c3 Non-Profit Team Alexander Athletics Colorado Club Basketball Program. The organization is exclusively for charitable and educational purposes addressing its mission through programs and events. T.A.A. encourages a cross-cultural environment to stimulate conversation with the purpose of overcoming racial barriers, relations and networking to promote unity through athletics and sports.
