= LenDale White =

American football player (born 1984)

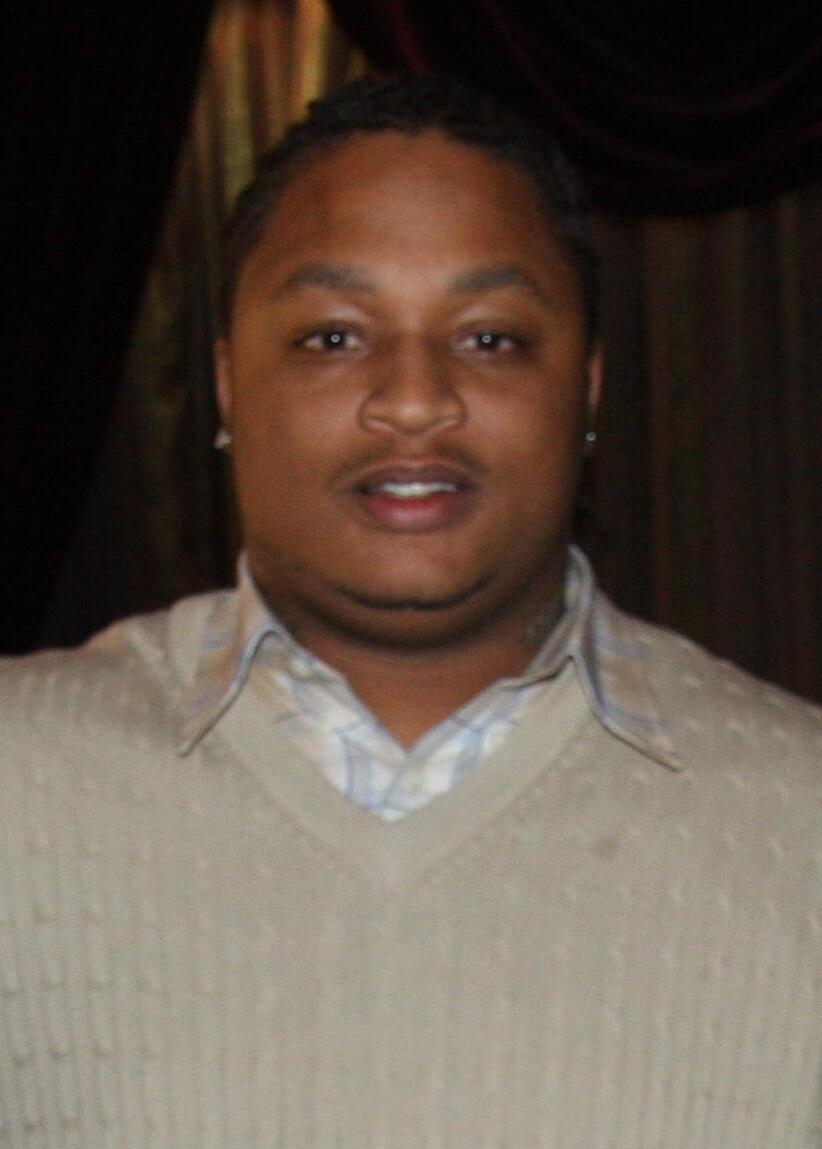
- White in 2008

No. 25
- Position: Running back

Personal information
- Born: December 20, 1984 (age 41); Denver, Colorado, U.S.
- Listed height: 6 ft 0 in (1.83 m)
- Listed weight: 235 lb (107 kg)

Career information
- High school: Chatfield (Littleton, Colorado)
- College: USC (2003–2005)
- NFL draft: 2006: 2nd round, 45th overall pick

Career history
- Tennessee Titans (2006–2009); Seattle Seahawks (2010)*; Denver Broncos (2010)
- * Offseason or practice squad member only

Awards and highlights
- Third-team All-American (2005); 2× Second-team All-Pac-10 (2004, 2005)

Career NFL statistics
- Rushing attempts: 628
- Rushing yards: 2,349
- Receptions: 42
- Receiving yards: 204
- Total touchdowns: 24
- Stats at Pro Football Reference

LenDale Anthony White (born December 20, 1984) is an American former professional football player who was a running back in the National Football League (NFL). He was selected by the Tennessee Titans in the second round (45th overall) of the 2006 NFL draft. He was also a member of the Seattle Seahawks and Denver Broncos. He played college football for the USC Trojans.

== Early life ==
White attended South High School in Denver, Colorado. He played football in 1999 and 2000, and he made the Rocky Mountain News All-Colorado first-team in 2000 and the Rocky Mountain News Class 5A All-State first-team both years. White then enrolled at Chatfield Senior High School in Littleton, Colorado. As a junior in 2001, he earned Rocky Mountain News All-Colorado first-team and Rocky Mountain News Class 5A All-State first-team notices. He rushed for 1,850 yards with 30 touchdowns and had 185 receiving yards with two touchdowns in 2001. Chatfield went 14–0 in 2001 and was the Class 5A champion. His coach at Chatfield was Dave Logan, the former Colorado All-American wide receiver who played in the NFL for the Cleveland Browns and Denver Broncos.

White's 2002 honors included Super Prep All-American, Prep Star All-American, Tom Lemming All-American, Super Prep Elite 50, Tom Lemming Top 100, Super Prep All-Midlands, Prep Star All-Midlands, Tom Lemming All-Midland, Orange County Register Fab 15 second-team, Gatorade Colorado Player of the Year, Rocky Mountain News All-Colorado first-team and Rocky Mountain News Class 5A All-State first-team as a senior tailback at Chatfield. He ran for 1,683 yards and 20 touchdowns in 2002. He played in the 2003 U.S. Army All-American Bowl with several of his future USC Trojan teammates. He finished his career (starting all four years) as Colorado's career high school rushing leader, with 7,804 yards.

== College career ==
White during his tenure at USC.

White scoring at California in 2005.

White shared his playing time at tailback with Reggie Bush at the University of Southern California. Despite being the less hyped member of the Trojan backfield, White was a standout rusher who led the team in rushing in his first two seasons and was a 2005 All-America selection.

White and Bush formed a "Thunder and Lightning" combination, with Bush playing the smaller but faster back while White was the bigger, stronger back. This combination gave USC a formidable backfield of rushers. Both combined for 3,042 rushing yards and 40 rushing touchdowns in 2005. On January 4, 2005, White rushed for three touchdowns in a 55–19 victory over Oklahoma in the 2005 Orange Bowl game played at Hard Rock Stadium in Miami. A year later, on January 4, 2006, White again rushed for three touchdowns in USC's 41–38 loss to Texas in the 2006 Rose Bowl played at the Rose Bowl in Pasadena, California. He led the nation with 24 rushing touchdowns in 2005. In his three years, White set the USC career rushing touchdowns record of 52. He also finished with 3,159 yards and a 5.9 average per rush. After the Rose Bowl, White declared himself eligible for the NFL draft.

== Professional career ==
=== Pre-draft ===
Pre-draft measurables
Height	Weight	Arm length	Hand span	Bench press
6 ft 0 3/8 in (1.84 m)	238 lb (108 kg)	31 3/4 in (0.81 m)	9 5/8 in (0.24 m)	15 reps
All values from NFL Combine/Pro Day

Promptly after declaring for the NFL draft, White's stock tumbled. White did not really go through a full workout before scouts at the NFL Scouting Combine. Reportedly, there were audible groans when he bared his chest at a weigh-in. One scout was said to have laughed upon seeing White's bare chest. ESPN's Fantasy Focus podcast referred to him as "Big Fat LenDale White." This also spawned another nickname: "LenWhale" White. As one NFL general manager said after seeing White at the combine: "The guy needed a bra, it was ridiculous. You come to the combine looking like that and you want to be a first-round pick? Come on. The guy had obviously been doing nothing."

During USC's pro day, he cited hamstring worries as a reason for not running or performing any workouts aside from the bench press, where he managed only 15 repetitions at 225 pounds. An out of shape White did sustain a torn hamstring, but surgery was not required to mend it. His injury did, however, keep him off the football field until May 2006.

=== Tennessee Titans ===
White was selected in the second round (45th overall) of the 2006 NFL draft by the Tennessee Titans.

On August 10, 2006, during a Titans' practice, White was involved in a brief scuffle with teammate Donnie Nickey, where White spat in Nickey's face, drawing the ire of his teammates. On the field, White was used sparingly in his rookie season. He played in 13 games, gaining 244 yards on 61 carries with no touchdowns. White also caught 14 passes for 60 yards.

White began the 2007 season splitting time with Chris Brown. He was held for under 60 rushing yards in the first four games. On October 21, with Brown sidelined with an injury, White recorded his first 100-yard rushing game against the Houston Texans. He followed up that performance with a career-high 133-yard rushing performance against the Oakland Raiders. For the season, he rushed for 1,110 yards and seven touchdowns with a 3.7 yard average. White underwent arthroscopic knee surgery. The knee had bothered White during the latter half of the 2007 season, but he was expected to be at full strength for off-season mini-camps in May. On March 15, 2008, White received citations for destruction of property, disobedience to a lawful order/interference and resistance while in Denver, Colorado, though all charges were later dropped.

White was joined in the Titans backfield by rookie Chris Johnson, who was selected with the 24th pick in the 2008 draft. The duo eventually became known as "Smash and Dash". White had career highs in touchdowns in a season (15), longest run (80 yards), touchdowns in one game (three) and rushing yards in a game (149). He also created controversy after the Titans defeated the Pittsburgh Steelers by stomping on a Terrible Towel. White finished the 2008 season with 773 rushing yards and 15 touchdowns (leading the AFC).

White lost significant weight prior to the 2009 season, dropping to 229, claiming a tougher training regimen and cutting tequila out of his diet aided in his weight loss. After splitting carries with Johnson in 2008, White was virtually a non-factor in 2009 as Johnson became the featured back. White was re-signed by the Titans on April 15, 2010.

=== Seattle Seahawks ===
White was traded to the Seattle Seahawks on April 24, 2010. The trade reunited White and his former USC head coach Pete Carroll. Shortly after signing, word leaked that White had failed an NFL drug test and would be suspended for the first four games of the 2010 season. The Seahawks released White on May 28, 2010.

=== Denver Broncos ===
On August 4, 2010, White was signed to a two-year deal by the Denver Broncos. However, on September 2, in the Broncos' last preseason game at the Minnesota Vikings, White suffered a torn Achilles tendon, and missed the entire 2010 season. He was released on August 16, 2011.

== Career statistics ==
=== NFL ===
Legend
**Bold**	Career high

==== Regular season ====
Year	Team	Games		Rushing					Receiving				
Year	Team	GP	GS	Att	Yds	Avg	Lng	TD	Rec	Yds	Avg	Lng	TD
2006	TEN	13	0	61	244	**4.0**	26	0	14	60	4.3	13	0
2007	TEN	**16**	**16**	**303**	**1,110**	3.7	28	7	**20**	**114**	**5.7**	**15**	0
2008	TEN	**16**	2	200	773	3.9	**80**	**15**	5	16	3.2	7	0
2009	TEN	13	0	64	222	3.5	11	2	3	14	4.7	7	0
Total		58	18	628	2,349	3.7	80	24	42	204	4.8	15	0

==== Playoffs ====
Year	Team	Games		Rushing					Receiving				
Year	Team	GP	GS	Att	Yds	Avg	Lng	TD	Rec	Yds	Avg	Lng	TD
2007	TEN	**1**	0	**19**	**69**	**3.6**	**13**	0	1	-3	-3.0	-3	0
2008	TEN	**1**	0	15	45	3.0	12	0	**4**	**35**	**8.8**	**19**	0
Total		2	0	34	114	3.4	13	0	5	32	6.4	19	0

=== College ===
Season	Team	GP	Rushing				Receiving		
Season	Team	GP	Att	Yards	Avg	TDs	Rec	Yards	TDs
2003	USC	13	141	754	5.3	13	6	15	1
2004	USC	13	203	1,103	5.4	15	11	97	2
2005	USC	13	197	1,302	6.6	24	14	219	2
**Career**		**39**	**541**	**3,159**	**5.8**	**52**	**31**	**331**	**5**

== See also ==
- List of NCAA Division I FBS running backs with at least 50 career rushing touchdowns
- List of NCAA major college football yearly rushing leaders
- List of NCAA major college football yearly scoring leaders
