= Michael Griffin (American football) =

American football player (born 1985)

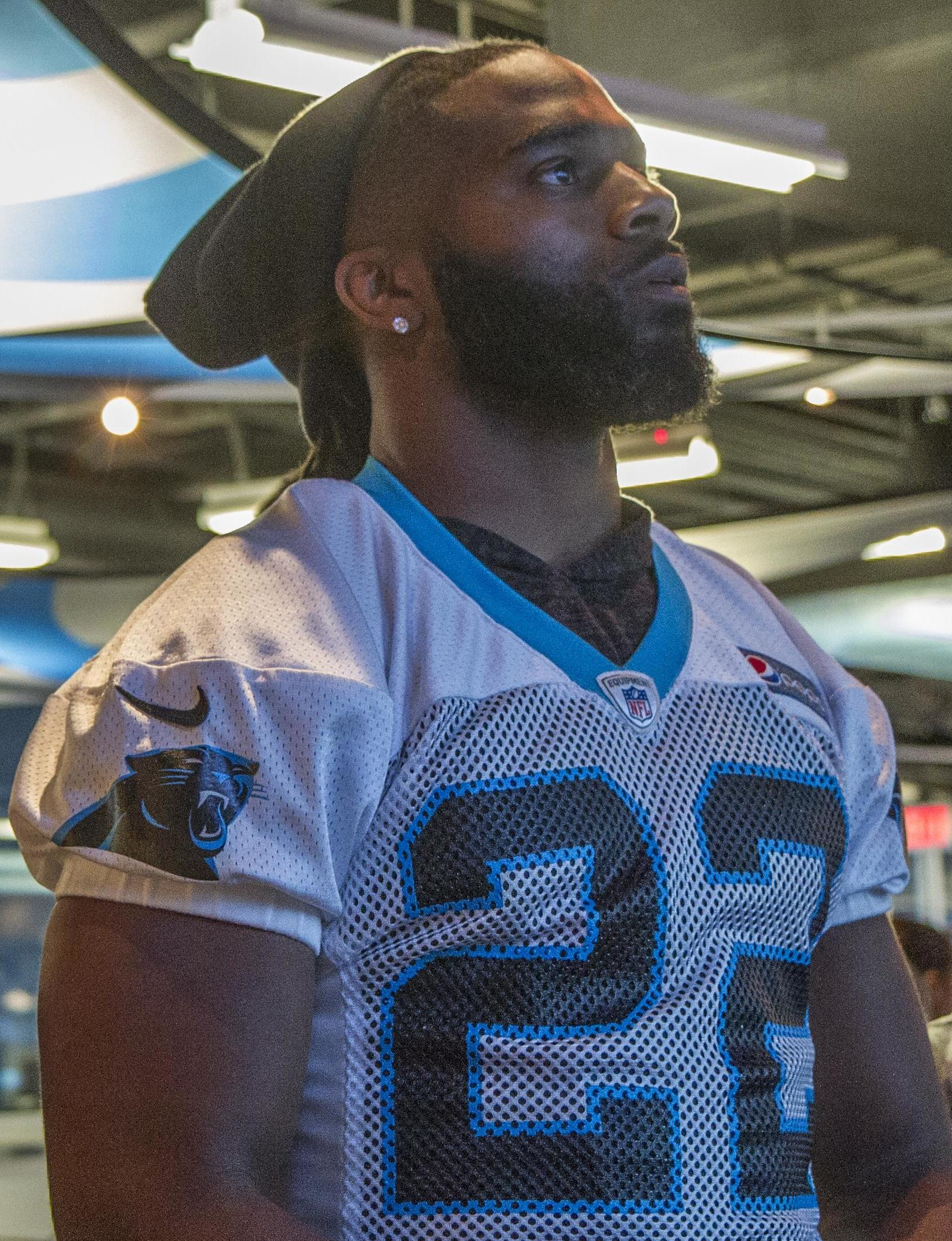
- Griffin with the Carolina Panthers in 2016

No. 33, 22
- Position: Safety

Personal information
- Born: January 4, 1985 (age 41); Austin, Texas, U.S.
- Listed height: 6 ft 0 in (1.83 m)
- Listed weight: 215 lb (98 kg)

Career information
- High school: Bowie (Austin)
- College: Texas (2003–2006)
- NFL draft: 2007: 1st round, 19th overall pick

Career history
- Tennessee Titans (2007–2015); Minnesota Vikings (2016)*; Carolina Panthers (2016)
- * Offseason or practice squad member only

Awards and highlights
- Second-team All-Pro (2010); 2× Pro Bowl (2008, 2010); PFWA All-Rookie Team (2007); BCS national champion (2005); Second-team All-American (2006); First-team All-Big 12 (2006); Second-team All-Big 12 (2005)

Career NFL statistics
- Total tackles: 803
- Sacks: 7
- Forced fumbles: 12
- Fumble recoveries: 6
- Interceptions: 25
- Defensive touchdowns: 1
- Stats at Pro Football Reference

Michael Devin Griffin (born January 4, 1985) is an American former professional football player who was a safety for 10 seasons in the National Football League (NFL). He played college football for the Texas Longhorns. He was selected by the Tennessee Titans in the first round of the 2007 NFL draft.

== Early life ==
A native of Austin, Texas, Griffin attended Bowie High School, where he was a two-year starter at running back and also started at defensive back as a senior. He earned honorable mention All-State Class 5A honors on offense and was also named Academic All-District and All-Central Texas as a two-way performer that year. He was also the District 25-5A Offensive MVP, as he rushed for 1,181 yards and 11 touchdowns on 132 carries (8.9 average) and caught six passes for 112 yards, including a score in 2002. He also added 46 tackles, three pass deflections and a forced fumble on defense. His top games of the 2002 season were in wins against Hays Consolidated (226 yards and three scores) and Austin (207 yards and three touchdowns). Griffin earned All-District honors as a junior after rushing for 946 yards and 14 touchdowns on 126 attempts (7.5 avg). He also had 11 receptions for 286 yards and four scores. During his final two seasons at Bowie, Griffin rushed for 2,127 yards and 25 touchdowns on the ground along with averaging 23.4 yards per catch.

In addition to football, Griffin also earned two letters in basketball as a guard and forward and three in track & field, competing in the sprints and mile relays. He qualified for the Regional track and field meet after posting personal-bests of 10.64 seconds in the 100-meter dash and 22.10 seconds in the 200-meter dash in his senior year.

Regarded as a four-star recruit, Griffin was the 9th-ranked cornerback recruit in the nation and the 60th player overall according to Rivals.com in a 2003 class that was highlighted by Antonio Cromartie and Donte Whitner. Griffin committed to play college football for the Texas Longhorns on December 13, 2002. He chose the Longhorns over scholarship offers from Baylor, Oklahoma and Texas A&M.

== College career ==
Griffin attended the University of Texas in Austin, where he started his college football career in 2003 as a true freshman for the Texas Longhorns football team. In 50 career games at Texas, Griffin started 28 times. He ranks eighth in school history with 368 tackles (234 of them solo). He produced four sacks for a loss of 46 yards, 14.5 stops for losses of 78 yards and 13 quarterback pressures. He recovered seven fumbles and caused nine others. His eight blocked kicks set a school career record and rank second in NCAA Division I-A history. He deflected 23 passes and intercepted eight others for 41 yards (5.1 average) in returns. He also totaled 124 yards on six blocked punt returns (20.7 average). On special teams, he posted 49 tackles.

Griffin was immediately thrust into the action in 2003, appearing in all 12 games at strong safety and starting at nickel back against Washington State and Texas Tech. He finished seventh on the team with 65 tackles (51 of them solo), adding two sacks, five stops for losses and three pressures. In addition, he recovered a fumble and caused three others while also batting down two passes.

In Griffin's sophomore season, 2004, he played behind Michael Huff at strong safety, earning his only start against Michigan in the 2005 Rose Bowl. He produced 49 tackles (37 of them solo) with a sack, two stops behind the line of scrimmage and a pair of pressures. He blocked two punts, picked off a pass and deflected three others. He also caused and recovered a fumble.

With Michael Huff entrenched at strong safety, Texas' coaches shifted Griffin to free safety for his junior season in 2005. A starter in 12 of 13 games, he was a second-team All-Big 12 Conference choice, as he led the team with 124 tackles (67 of them solo), including four stops for losses and five pressures. He tied the school single-season record with four blocked kicks and had three interceptions with eight pass break-ups. He recovered three fumbles and caused another. Griffin intercepted a pass at the goal line in Texas' 41-38 Rose Bowl win against USC for the national championship.

As a senior in 2006, Griffin earned second-team All-American and first-team All-Big 12 accolades. He again led the team from his free safety position, collecting a career-high 126 tackles (79 of them solo) with a sack, 3.5 stops for losses and three pressures. He caused four fumbles, recovered two others and blocked two kicks. He deflected 10 passes and had four interceptions.

== Professional career ==
Pre-draft measurables
Height	Weight	Arm length	Hand span	40-yard dash	10-yard split	20-yard split	20-yard shuttle	Three-cone drill	Vertical jump	Broad jump	Bench press
5 ft 11 3/4 in (1.82 m)	202 lb (92 kg)	33 1/8 in (0.84 m)	10 1/4 in (0.26 m)	4.47 s	1.60 s	2.63 s	4.10 s	6.60 s	36 in (0.91 m)	10 ft 0 in (3.05 m)	16 reps
All values from NFL Combine and Pro Day

=== Tennessee Titans ===
On May 4, 2007, head coach Jeff Fisher stated that Griffin would be moved from safety to cornerback due to Adam Pacman Jones' year long suspension; however, later on in the season, Griffin was moved back to safety after depth at the cornerback position developed better than expected and starting free safety Calvin Lowry was unable to prevent big plays. Griffin finished the season with three interceptions and one forced fumble (all of which came at the safety position), as well as fifty-four total tackles.

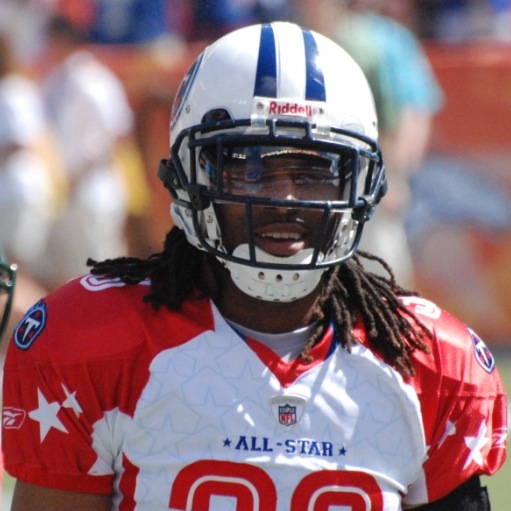
Griffin playing in the 2009 Pro Bowl

In Griffin's second NFL season in 2008 he finished with 75 tackles, 1 forced fumble, 7 interceptions and 11 pass deflections while playing all 16 games. In a Week 16 31–14 win against the Pittsburgh Steelers, Griffin had 2 interceptions returning one for a pick-six. Griffin went on to be named to his first Pro Bowl.

In Griffin's third season in 2009 he finished with 77 tackles, 2 forced fumbles, and 2 fumble recoveries, 1 interception and 7 pass deflections while once again playing all 16 games. Griffin helped the Titans finished the final ten games 8–2 after the team lost the first 6 games.

Griffin's fourth season in 2010 saw him record 108 tackles, 2 forced fumbles, and 2 fumble recoveries, 4 interceptions and 12 pass deflections while playing all 16 games for the fourth consecutive year. Griffin had a span of 4 weeks (10/3-10/24) where he had an interception each game. Griffin also had 3 games where he recorded more than 10 tackles. Griffin was selected to his 2nd Pro bowl along with Kansas City's Chiefs Safety Eric Berry as Alternates.

Griffin entered his fifth NFL season in 2011 in a contract year. He once again played all 16 games. Griffin finished his contract year with 75 tackles, 1 forced fumble, 2 interceptions and 7 pass deflections On November 18, 2011, Griffin was fined $7,500 for a late hit against the Carolina Panthers. On March 5, 2012, Griffin was assigned the franchise tag worth $6.2 million. On June 19, 2012, Griffin signed a 5-year $35 million contract.

In 2012, in Griffin's first season since signing his new contract he had 79 tackles, 2 forced fumbles, 1 sack, 4 interceptions and 4 pass deflections while playing all 16 games for a sixth season in a row. In a week 2 game against the New England Patriots, Griffin record a career-high 18 tackles. On November 9, 2012, Griffin was fined $20,000 for his horse-collar tackle on Chicago Bears running back Matt Forte.

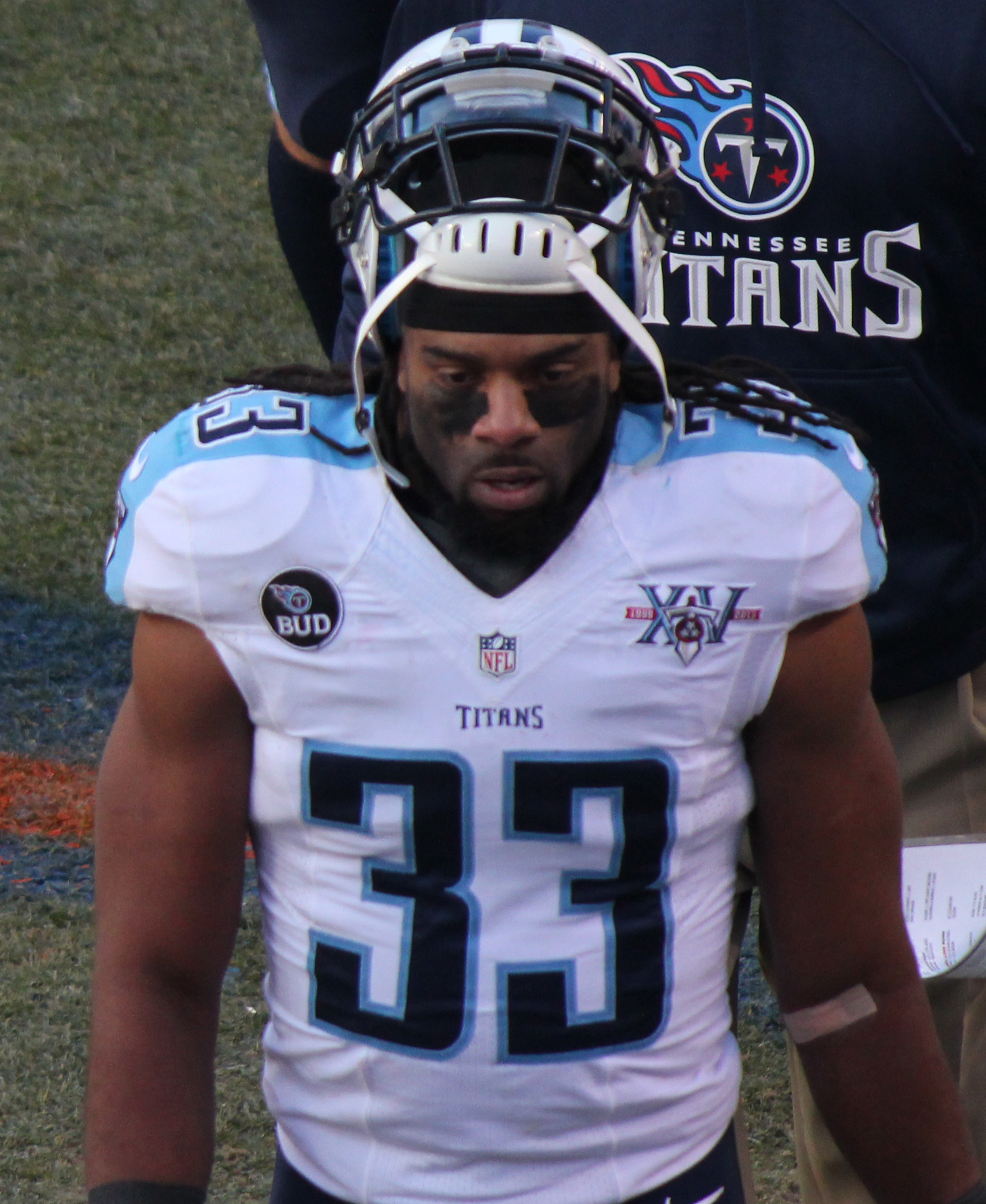
Griffin playing for the Titans in 2013

In the 2013 NFL season Griffin played 14 games and for the first time in his seven-year career missed a game. Griffin still finished the season with 82 tackles, 3 forced fumbles, 1 interception and 4 pass deflections.

In Griffin's 2014 season, he had a career-high 112 tackles and 3 sacks. Griffin also recorded 2 interceptions and 5 pass deflections while playing all 16 games.

In Griffin's ninth season in 2015, he recorded 101 tackles, 1 sack, 1 interception and 3 pass deflections. On February 9, 2016, Griffin was released ending his 9-year stint with the Titans.

=== Minnesota Vikings ===
Griffin signed with the Minnesota Vikings on March 9, 2016. On September 3, 2016, he was placed on injured reserve. On September 8, he was released from the Vikings' injured reserve.

=== Carolina Panthers ===
On September 27, 2016, Griffin signed with the Carolina Panthers.

=== Retirement ===
On May 6, 2018, he signed a one-day contract to retire as a member of the Tennessee Titans.

=== Flag football ===
In 2018, Griffin played as a member of the Roadrunners led by former quarterback, Michael Vick, in the American Flag Football League.

== Career statistics ==
=== College ===
Regular season statistics				Tackles					Interceptions						Fumbles			
Season	Team	GP	GS	Comb	Total	Ast	Sck	Tfl	PDef	Int	Yds	Avg	Lng	TDs	FF	FR	FR YDS	TDs
2003	Texas	12	2	65	51	14	2.0	5.0	2	0	0	0.0	0	0	3	1	0	0
2004	Texas	12	1	49	37	12	1.0	2.0	3	1	0	0.0	0	0	1	1	0	0
2005	Texas	13	12	124	67	57	0.0	4.0	8	3	0	0.0	0	0	1	3	0	0
2006	Texas	13	13	126	79	47	1.0	3.5	10	4	41	10.3	16	0	4	2	0	0
Totals		50	28	364	234	130	4.0	14.5	23	8	41	5.1	16	0	9	7	0	0

=== NFL statistics ===
Year	Team	GP	COMB	TOTAL	AST	SACK	FF	FR	FR YDS	INT	IR YDS	AVG IR	LNG	TD	PD
2007	TEN	16	54	41	13	0.0	1	0	0	3	3	1	3	0	7
2008	TEN	16	75	55	20	1.0	1	1	0	7	172	25	83	1	11
2009	TEN	16	77	57	20	1.0	2	2	0	1	3	3	3	0	7
2010	TEN	16	108	86	22	0.0	2	2	20	4	50	13	28	0	12
2011	TEN	16	75	59	16	0.0	1	0	0	2	0	0	0	0	7
2012	TEN	16	79	60	19	1.0	2	0	0	4	59	15	33	0	4
2013	TEN	14	82	61	21	0.0	3	1	0	1	0	0	0	0	4
2014	TEN	16	112	85	27	3.0	0	0	0	2	12	6	12	0	5
2015	TEN	15	101	66	35	1	0	0	0	1	29	29	29	0	3
2016	CAR	10	30	18	12	0.0	0	0	0	0	0	0	0	0	0
Career		151	793	588	205	7.0	12	6	0	25	299	12	83	1	60

== Personal life ==
In college, Griffin was an honors student majoring in youth and community studies. He graduated from the University of Texas' College of Education in May 2017. He has a twin brother, Marcus Griffin, who was also a defensive back at the University of Texas. He always wears a watch during practices and his teammates often ask him how many minutes before practice is over. Their parents, Ronald and Mae, are both retired from the United States Armed Services.

In 2010, Griffin joined the School of the Legends (SOTL), which is an online community for NFL Players, coaches, and fans.

Griffin married his longtime girlfriend, Shantel Spence, and they share daughters Mya D. Griffin and Mikenzie A. Griffin. He also has a son Michael Braylen Griffin.

Along with Brian Orakpo, Griffin co-owns Gigi's Cupcakes in Austin, Texas.

== See also ==
List of Texas Longhorns football All-Americans
