= Lavelle Hawkins =

American football player (born 1986)

No. 10, 87
- Position: Wide receiver

Personal information
- Born: July 12, 1986 (age 40); Stockton, California, U.S.
- Listed height: 5 ft 11 in (1.80 m)
- Listed weight: 194 lb (88 kg)

Career information
- High school: Edison (Stockton)
- College: California
- NFL draft: 2008: 4th round, 126th overall pick

Career history
- Tennessee Titans (2008−2012); New England Patriots (2013)*; San Francisco 49ers (2013)*; San Diego Chargers (2013); Tampa Bay Buccaneers (2014)*; BC Lions (2015)
- * Offseason or practice squad member only

Awards and highlights
- NJCAA All-American (2004); Second-team All-Pac-10 (2007)

Career NFL statistics
- Receptions: 71
- Receiving yards: 771
- Receiving average: 10.9
- Receiving touchdowns: 1
- Stats at Pro Football Reference
- Stats at CFL.ca (archive)

Lavelle Lamar Hawkins (born July 12, 1986) is an American former professional football player who was a wide receiver in the National Football League (NFL). He was selected by the Tennessee Titans in the fourth round of the 2008 NFL draft. He played college football for the California Golden Bears.

== Early life ==
He played high school football at Edison High School in Stockton, California. He originally committed to Louisiana State University. As a freshman in 2004, he transferred after one game to City College in San Francisco. As a sophomore, he transferred to the University of California, Berkeley.

== Professional career ==
=== Tennessee Titans ===
The Tennessee Titans selected Hawkins with the 126th overall pick in the fourth round of the 2008 NFL draft. He is notable for being the player the Titans selected with the pick they acquired in the Pacman Jones trade, as well as being the only wide receiver the Titans selected in the 2008 NFL Draft.

During five seasons with the Titans, Hawkins caught 71 receptions for 771 yards. His most productive season was in 2011 when he played in all 16 games and caught 47 passes for 470 yards and one touchdown.

=== New England Patriots ===
Hawkins was signed by the New England Patriots to a 2-year deal on May 9, 2013. On July 31, 2013, Hawkins was released.

=== San Francisco 49ers ===
On August 2, 2013, Hawkins signed with the San Francisco 49ers. Despite a productive preseason, he was released during the final round of roster cuts on August 31, 2013.

=== San Diego Chargers ===
On October 1, 2013, Hawkins signed with the San Diego Chargers. Hawkins appeared in four games as a kick returner.

=== Tampa Bay Buccaneers ===
On April 7, 2014, Hawkins signed with the Tampa Bay Buccaneers. Hawkins was released by the Buccaneers on August 20, 2014.

=== BC Lions ===
On March 24, 2015, Hawkins signed with the BC Lions, reuniting with his former university coach Jeff Tedford. He left the team during training camp on June 6, 2016, to become a firefighter.

== Coaching career ==
Hawkins is currently the wide receivers coach/director of football operations at his alma mater, Edison High School in Stockton, California.

== Personal ==
Hawkins is a cousin of former New Orleans Saints running back Lynell Hamilton.
