= Jacob Ford (American football) =

American football player (born 1983)

No. 78
- Position: Defensive end

Personal information
- Born: July 20, 1983 (age 43); Memphis, Tennessee, U.S.
- Listed height: 6 ft 4 in (1.93 m)
- Listed weight: 252 lb (114 kg)

Career information
- High school: Melrose (Memphis)
- College: Central Arkansas
- NFL draft: 2007: 6th round, 204th overall pick

Career history
- Tennessee Titans (2007–2010)

Career NFL statistics
- Total tackles: 90
- Sacks: 15.5
- Forced fumbles: 4
- Stats at Pro Football Reference

Jacob Aaron Taylor Ford (born July 20, 1983) is an American former professional football player who was a defensive end in the National Football League (NFL). He played college football for the Central Arkansas Bears and was selected by the Tennessee Titans in the sixth round of the 2007 NFL draft.

== Early life ==
At Melrose High School (Memphis, Tennessee) earned All-Shelby Metro, Prep Star All-Southeast Region and High Tech Tennessee's Top Prospect List honors as senior two-way lineman. He registered 229 tackles and 32 sacks during career and helped team win 1998 State Championship. He also ran track three seasons.

== College career ==
In two seasons at Central Arkansas, Ford totaled 102 tackles, 17 sacks and 32.5 tackles for loss. As a senior (2006), he was named Division II First-team All-American by College Sports Report after starting all 10 games and leading the team with eight sacks and 15.5 tackles for loss. He added 48 tackles, four passes defensed, three forced fumbles and one fumble recovery. As a junior (2005) at Central Arkansas, he was named first-team All-Gulf South Conference, First-team All-Region and Second- team All-American after starting all 14 games for Bears team that made NCAA Division II quarterfinals. As a sophomore (2004) at Holmes Community College (Goodman, Miss.), Ford played nine games and earned All-State honors. Ford was not enrolled in college during 2002 and 2003 seasons. As a freshman (2001) at Memphis, earned Freshman All-Conference USA honors after appearing in 10 games.

== Professional career ==
Pre-draft measurables
Height	Weight	Arm length	Hand span	40-yard dash	10-yard split	20-yard split	Bench press
6 ft 3 5/8 in (1.92 m)	249 lb (113 kg)	33 3/8 in (0.85 m)	10 1/8 in (0.26 m)	4.68 s	1.61 s	2.70 s	19 reps
All values from NFL Combine

At the 2007 NFL Combine, Ford ran the 40-yard dash in 4.68 seconds, the second-best time among defensive ends.

He was selected by the Tennessee Titans as the 204th overall pick in the sixth round of the 2007 NFL draft. In 2007 Ford injured his left Achilles’ tendon in practice on August 13, 2007 and was placed on injured reserve a week later. The next season, 2008, Ford played 14 games with three starts and totaled 26 tackles, two forced fumbles, and seven sacks. On September 3, 2011, the Titans cut Ford.
