= Paul Williams (wide receiver) =

American football player (born 1983)

No. 11, 17
- Position: Wide receiver

Personal information
- Born: December 2, 1983 (age 42); Avenal, California, U.S.
- Listed height: 6 ft 1 in (1.85 m)
- Listed weight: 205 lb (93 kg)

Career information
- College: Fresno State
- NFL draft: 2007: 3rd round, 80th overall pick

Career history
- Tennessee Titans (2007–2009); Houston Texans (2010–2011)*
- * Offseason or practice squad member only

Awards and highlights
- First-team All-WAC (2006)

Career NFL statistics
- Receptions: 1
- Receiving yards: 7
- Stats at Pro Football Reference

Paul Edward Williams (born December 2, 1983) is an American former professional football player who was a wide receiver in the National Football League (NFL). He played college football for the Fresno State Bulldogs and was selected by the Tennessee Titans in the third round of the 2007 NFL draft.

Williams was also a member of the Houston Texans. He is the uncle of Lynn Williams, Uswnt forward.

== College career ==
=== Statistics ===
Year	G	Rec	Yds	Yds/G	Avg	Lg	TD
2003	2	3	20	10	6.7	15	0
2004	5	5	70	14	14	43	0
2005	13	43	729	56.1	17.0	98	7
2006	6	21	500	38.2	10.9	38	1
Total	26	72	1,048	40.3	14.2	98	8
