= Troy Kropog =

American football player (born 1986)

No. 70
- Position: Offensive tackle

Personal information
- Born: July 31, 1986 (age 40); Metairie, Louisiana, U.S.
- Listed height: 6 ft 5 in (1.96 m)
- Listed weight: 316 lb (143 kg)

Career information
- High school: Rummel (Metairie)
- College: Tulane
- NFL draft: 2009: 4th round, 135th overall pick

Career history
- Tennessee Titans (2009−2012); Jacksonville Jaguars (2012); Minnesota Vikings (2012); Washington Redskins (2013)*; New York Giants (2014)
- * Offseason or practice squad member only

Career NFL statistics
- Games played: 7
- Stats at Pro Football Reference

Troy Michael Kropog (born July 31, 1986) is an American former professional football player who was an offensive tackle in the National Football League (NFL). He was selected by the Tennessee Titans in the fourth round of the 2009 NFL draft. He played college football for the Tulane Green Wave.

== Professional career ==
=== Tennessee Titans ===
Kropog played in seven games for the Tennessee Titans from 2009 to 2012.

=== Jacksonville Jaguars ===
Kropog was signed by the Jacksonville Jaguars on September 12, 2012, and released on September 15.

=== Minnesota Vikings ===
Kropog was signed to the Minnesota Vikings' practice squad on September 18, 2012.

In December 2012 Kropog was promoted to the Vikings 53 man roster after Percy Harvin was placed on the IR list. Kropog was released by the Vikings on September 1, 2013.

=== Washington Redskins ===
Kropog was signed to the Washington Redskins' practice squad on September 24, 2013.

=== New York Giants ===
Kropog was signed to the New York Giants' roster on January 7, 2014. He was released by the Giants on July 31, 2015.
