= Ahmard Hall =

American Marine and football player

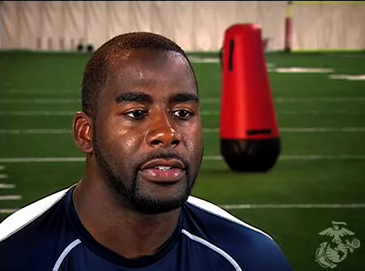
- Photo credit: Marines.com

No. 45
- Position: Fullback

Personal information
- Born: November 13, 1979 (age 46); Galveston, Texas, U.S.
- Listed height: 5 ft 11 in (1.80 m)
- Listed weight: 242 lb (110 kg)

Career information
- High school: Angleton (Angleton, Texas)
- College: Texas
- NFL draft: 2006: undrafted

Career history
- Tennessee Titans (2006–2011)

Awards and highlights
- BCS national champion (2005)

Career NFL statistics
- Rushing attempts: 24
- Rushing yards: 80
- Receptions: 73
- Receiving yards: 561
- Total touchdowns: 2
- Stats at Pro Football Reference

Ahmard Rashad Hall (born November 13, 1979) is an American former professional football player who was a fullback for the Tennessee Titans of the National Football League (NFL). He played college football for the Texas Longhorns and was originally signed by the Titans as an undrafted free agent in 2006. He is also a United States Marine.

== Early life and military service ==
Ahmard Rashad Hall was born on November 13, 1979, in Galveston, Texas. He attended Angleton High School in Angleton, Texas. In high school, in addition to playing football, he was a member of the track team and the baseball team. He was team captain of the football team and was an all-district player.

He served for four years (1998–2002) in the United States Marine Corps in the 2nd Battalion, 8th Marines as a field radio operator reaching the rank of sergeant. He served tours of duty in Kosovo and Afghanistan. He attended the University of Texas (UT) on the G.I. Bill. He was a walk-on to the football program at UT.

== College career ==
Hall played fullback at the University of Texas at Austin for the Longhorns, including their 2005 national championship team.

== Professional career ==
Hall played in 14 games his rookie season, rushing seven times for a total of 21 yards. He caught 15 balls, for 138 yards. Ahmard also played on special teams, making five tackles. He went on to play 85 games for the Titans until 2011.
