= David Stewart (American football) =

American football player (born 1982)

No. 76
- Position: Offensive tackle

Personal information
- Born: August 28, 1982 (age 44); Decatur, Alabama, U.S.
- Listed height: 6 ft 7 in (2.01 m)
- Listed weight: 313 lb (142 kg)

Career information
- High school: Moulton (AL) Lawrence County
- College: Mississippi State
- NFL draft: 2005: 4th round, 113th overall pick

Career history
- Tennessee Titans (2005–2013)

Awards and highlights
- Second-team All-Pro (2008)

Career NFL statistics
- Games played: 116
- Games started: 116
- Fumble recoveries: 5
- Stats at Pro Football Reference

David Stewart (born August 28, 1982) is an American former professional football player who was an offensive tackle in the National Football League (NFL). He played college football for Mississippi State and was selected by the Tennessee Titans in the fourth round of the 2005 NFL draft.

== Early life ==
Stewart attended Lawrence County High School in Moulton, Alabama, where he was a two-way tackle and three-year letterman. He earned Class 4A all-state honors on the offensive line from the Birmingham News. Stewart also recorded 120 tackles, including 28 quarterback sacks during his junior and senior years while on defense.

He was rated with the top offensive linemen in the western half of the southeast region (Louisiana, Alabama, Mississippi, Arkansas) by Bobby Burton in his Rivals.com preseason recruiting magazine and said to have "as much potential as anyone in the state" by that publication.

== College career ==
Stewart enrolled at Mississippi State University, where he played for the Mississippi State Bulldogs football team from 2001 to 2004. After redshirting his initial year, Stewart appeared in six games during the 2001 season, starting against Louisiana State, Arkansas and Troy State. The following year, he took over the right tackle slot and went on to start the next 35 contests. He graded 82 percent for blocking consistency as a sophomore and produced 76 knockdown blocks the following season.

As a senior, Stewart graded a career-high 84.8 percent and also totaled 69 knockdowns, which earned him All-Southeastern Conference honors. In his last 35 games, Stewart recorded 218 knockdowns and had 25 touchdown-resulting blocks.

== Professional career ==
After being inactive all 16 games in his rookie season in 2005, Stewart became the starting right tackle in 2006, replacing Michael Roos who was moved to left tackle, and was part of an offensive line that spearheaded the fifth ranked rushing attack in the NFL. As of February 2009, Stewart has made 45 consecutive starts at right tackle for the Titans, including all 16 games over the past two seasons. He was a member of an offensive line that allowed an NFL-low 12 quarterback sacks in 2008 and was named to the 2008 All-Pro Second-team.

He was released on March 12, 2014.
