= Ken Amato =

American football player and coach (born 1977)

Dallas Cowboys
- Title: Defensive assistant

Personal information
- Born: May 18, 1977 (age 49); Puerto Rico
- Listed height: 6 ft 2 in (1.88 m)
- Listed weight: 245 lb (111 kg)

Career information
- High school: Miami (FL) Braddock
- College: Montana State
- NFL draft: 1999: undrafted

Career history

Playing
- Carolina Panthers (2002-2003)*; Tennessee Titans (2003–2011)
- * Offseason or practice squad member only

Coaching
- Brentwood High School (2013-2015) Outside linebacker coach; Limestone (2016) Special teams coordinator; Dallas Cowboys (2017) Special teams assistant; Dallas Cowboys (2018-present) Defensive assistant

Career NFL statistics
- Games played: 125
- Total tackles: 44
- Fumble recoveries: 1
- Stats at Pro Football Reference

Kenneth Carlos Amato (born May 18, 1977) is a former American football long snapper and current defensive assistant coach for the Dallas Cowboys of the National Football League (NFL). Prior to his coaching career, he spent nine seasons as a long snapper for the Tennessee Titans. He played college football at Montana State.

== Early life ==
Ken Amato attended Braddock High School in Miami, Florida. He was a Dade County All-Star Team member in football, and also participated in volleyball and in track and field as a high jumper. Amato learned to long snap in his last year playing Pop Warner football, but he did not do it again until college.

== Playing career ==
=== College career ===
Amato attended Moorpark Junior College for two years, then transferred to Montana State University. He served as the long snapper all four years. As a sophomore, he won All-Conference honors. As a junior, he played defensive end and linebacker, and posted 48 tackles and 2.5 sacks. As a senior, he had three sacks, one fumble recovery, and 41 tackles.

After his college eligibility expired at the end of the 1998 season Amato spent the next two years finishing his degree while also assisting Montana State's coaching staff with video work, as well as other tasks.

=== Professional playing career ===
After graduation, he then spent two years working as a full-time juvenile service specialist in Miami, Florida. He then joined the Carolina Panthers 2002 and 2003. However, he was released during training camp each season. After being released by the Panthers for the second time, he signed with the Tennessee Titans on August 12, 2003. He played as long snapper in every regular season game for Tennessee that season, as well as on special teams. He also played linebacker in extra linebacker situations, and made seven career tackles in that position.

== Coaching career ==
=== High school and college coaching ===
After retiring from professional football in 2011, Amato became the outside linebackers coach at Brentwood High School in Brentwood, Tennessee in 2013. After three seasons in that position, he became the special teams coordinator at Limestone College in 2016.

=== Professional coaching ===
In 2017, he joined the Dallas Cowboys as a special teams assistant. In February 2018, he was named a defensive assistant on the coaching staff of head coach Jason Garrett.

== Personal life ==
Amato's father, Paul, is Italian-Irish and his mother, Isora Gotay, is from Puerto Rico. Amato married his wife Sandi in July 2004. The couple resides in Brentwood, Tennessee. They have a daughter named Jazlyn (born May 6, 2007).
