= Jacques Cesaire =

American football player and coach (born 1980)

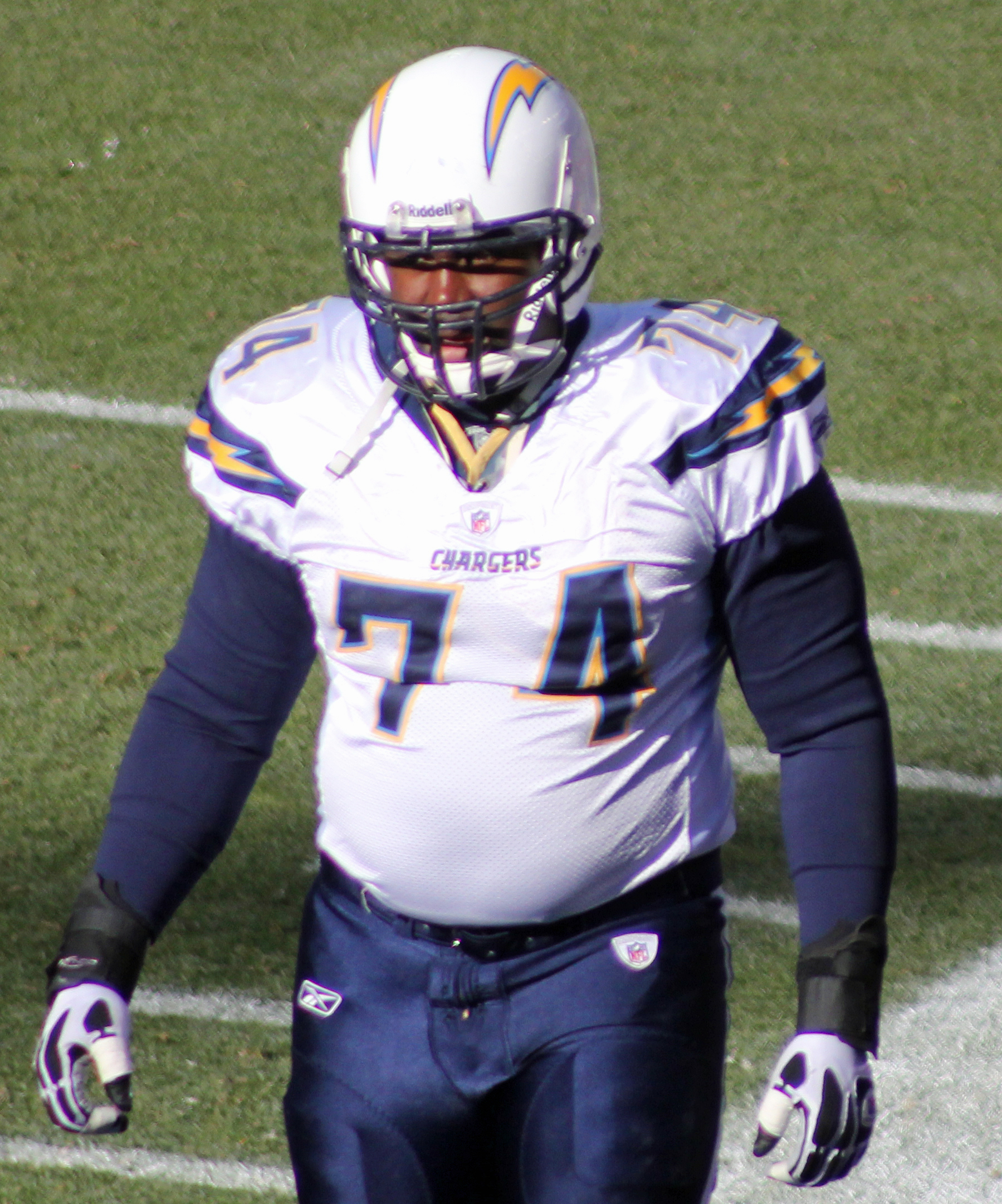
- Cesaire in 2011.

Cleveland Browns
- Title: Defensive line coach

Personal information
- Born: August 30, 1980 (age 46); Worcester, Massachusetts, U.S.
- Listed height: 6 ft 2 in (1.88 m)
- Listed weight: 295 lb (134 kg)

Career information
- Position: Defensive end (No. 74)
- High school: St. Bernard's (Fitchburg, Massachusetts); Gardner (Gardner, Massachusetts)
- College: Southern Connecticut (1998–2002)
- NFL draft: 2003: undrafted

Career history

Playing
- San Diego Chargers (2003–2011)

Coaching
- San Diego (2015–2019) Defensive line coach; Buffalo Bills (2020–2021) Assistant defensive line coach; Houston Texans (2022–2023) Defensive line coach; Cleveland Browns (2024–present) Defensive line coach

Awards and highlights
- NE-10 Defensive Lineman of the Year (2002); NCAA Division II All-America (2002)

Career NFL statistics
- Total tackles: 220
- Sacks: 12.5
- Forced fumbles: 3
- Stats at Pro Football Reference

Jacques E. Cesaire (born August 30, 1980) is an American professional football coach and former player who is the defensive line coach for the Cleveland Browns of the National Football League (NFL). He played in the NFL as a defensive end, spending his entire nine-year playing career with the San Diego Chargers. Cesaire played college football for the Southern Connecticut Fighting Owls.

== Early life ==
A native of Gardner and of Haitian descent, Cesaire started his high school football career in 1994 at nearby St. Bernard's High School in Fitchburg. However, he transferred to Gardner High School in 1996, and graduated there two years later. At Gardner, Cesaire lettered in football, basketball, and track and field.

Cesaire played football at Southern Connecticut State University from 1998 to 2002. In his final year, he was named the Northeast-10 Conference Defensive Lineman of the Year and was selected to the NCAA Division II All-America team by the American Football Coaches Association (AFCA). He also played in the Cactus Bowl.

== Professional career ==
In 2003, Cesaire was signed by the San Diego Chargers as an undrafted free agent. He was one of many successful undrafted Chargers players that year, along with Stephen Cooper, Kris Dielman, Antonio Gates, and Kassim Osgood.

Cesaire's best years came between 2006 and 2008, when he totaled 8.5 sacks while playing a key role in the Chargers' defense. During these years, he was considered to be a significant team leader.

Cesaire was released on August 31, 2012, after nine seasons with the Chargers. In total, he started 66 games, recorded 220 tackles, and tallied 12.5 sacks.

On January 21, 2013, Cesaire announced his retirement. He spent his entire NFL career with the Chargers, winning five AFC West titles and reaching the AFC Championship Game during the 2007-08 playoffs.

== NFL career statistics ==
Legend
**Bold**	Career high

=== Regular season ===
Year	Team	Games		Tackles					Interceptions					Fumbles			
Year	Team	GP	GS	Cmb	Solo	Ast	Sck	TFL	Int	Yds	TD	Lng	PD	FF	FR	Yds	TD
2003	SD	4	0	3	1	2	0.0	0	0	0	0	0	0	0	0	0	0
2004	SD	**16**	12	24	18	6	0.5	1	0	0	0	0	**3**	0	0	0	0
2005	SD	**16**	5	25	17	8	1.0	2	0	0	0	0	0	0	0	0	0
2006	SD	**16**	10	**37**	**27**	10	**4.0**	**6**	0	0	0	0	1	**1**	0	0	0
2007	SD	**16**	6	**37**	20	**17**	2.5	1	0	0	0	0	**3**	**1**	0	0	0
2008	SD	**16**	2	22	16	6	2.0	2	0	0	0	0	2	0	0	0	0
2009	SD	13	13	26	15	11	1.0	1	0	0	0	0	0	**1**	**1**	0	0
2010	SD	**16**	**16**	31	23	8	1.5	3	0	0	0	0	0	0	0	0	0
2011	SD	12	2	15	10	5	0.0	2	0	0	0	0	0	0	0	0	0
		125	66	220	147	73	12.5	18	0	0	0	0	9	3	1	0	0

=== Playoffs ===
Year	Team	Games		Tackles					Interceptions					Fumbles			
Year	Team	GP	GS	Cmb	Solo	Ast	Sck	TFL	Int	Yds	TD	Lng	PD	FF	FR	Yds	TD
2004	SD	1	**1**	0	0	0	0.0	0	0	0	0	0	0	0	0	0	0
2007	SD	**3**	0	4	**4**	0	**1.0**	**1**	0	0	0	0	0	0	0	0	0
2008	SD	2	0	**5**	**4**	**1**	0.0	0	0	0	0	0	0	0	0	0	0
2009	SD	1	**1**	4	3	**1**	0.0	0	0	0	0	0	0	0	0	0	0
		7	2	13	11	2	1.0	1	0	0	0	0	0	0	0	0	0

== Coaching career ==
After a year working as a sports analyst for local radio and television in the San Diego area, Cesaire began his coaching career in college football with the Toreros of the University of San Diego in 2015. He was the assistant defensive line coach under Dale Lindsey until 2019. The team won the Pioneer Football League in each year Cesaire coached there.

On February 7, 2020, Cesaire was hired as the assistant defensive line coach, under Sean McDermott, for the Buffalo Bills. The Bills won the AFC East title while he coached there.

On February 21, 2022, two weeks after the hiring of Lovie Smith, Cesaire was hired as the defensive line coach for the Houston Texans.

On January 27, 2024, Cesaire was hired as the defensive line coach for the Cleveland Browns after the Texans declined to renew his contract.

== Personal life ==
Cesaire was married to a fellow Southern Connecticut alum, with whom he has three children: Viviana, Desmond, and Cassius.

== See also ==
- List of Haitian Americans
- List of people from Massachusetts
