= Religious symbolism in U.S. sports team names and mascots =

Many American sports team names and mascots are based upon or use religious symbolism. The majority are scholastic teams at institutions founded by various denominations of Christianity, both Catholic and Protestant. Saints is the most popular of these names not only at religious schools but public schools. However, the latter are often indirect, the schools being located in places named for saints. The only team name that has become controversial is Crusaders, many having changed in recent years. The term, once associated with protectors of the faith is now also associated with oppression. Many Christian schools use "Knights" as their team names with imagery similar to crusaders, but it is difficult to establish religious symbolism in these cases. There are also a number of teams whose name includes demons or devils, which are mythological creatures from many cultures. However, the devil imagery in sports used by professional sports teams as well as public and non-sectarian schools are an example of the Devil in the arts and popular culture more than religion. There are also a few team identities based upon Norse mythology in popular culture.

== Sports mascots and social identity ==
Team names and their associated sports mascots are examples of totems in the social sciences; symbols that serve both social and psychological functions with many implicit meanings. The social function is to connect individuals into a community; the psychological function is to symbolize desired qualities with which fans can identify. Mascots are also stereotypes, social constructs which are not always inappropriate when they provide valid, if simplified, perceptions of group differences. Participation in sports either as a player or a fan is a significant determinant of social status for college students, in particular for men. The most popular category of sports mascots are animals, with Eagles (symbolic of America) at the top of the list followed by Tigers, Bulldogs and Panthers (symbolic of aggression). Of religious meanings, only Saints is in the top 100 in popularity with Catholic, Protestant, and public schools represented. However, many Saints teams currently have a St. Bernard dog as their mascot, often portrayed by a costumed performer.

== Sectarian schools ==
=== Catholic colleges and universities ===
Holy Cross Crusaders logo

- College of the Holy Cross, Worcester, Massachusetts - Holy Cross Crusaders
- DePaul University, Chicago, Illinois - The origin of the DePaul Blue Demons dates back to 1907 when the university changed its name from St. Vincent's College. At the time, the athletic teams had red uniforms with a large "D" on the front, the players being called the "D-men," evolving into "Demons." The name change also included the school colors. The mascot is DIBS (Demon in a Blue Suit).
- Providence College, Providence, Rhode Island - Providence Friars
- Saint Joseph's College of Maine, Standish, Maine - Monks, The Monk is a costumed mascot
- University of Saint Thomas, Minneapolis and Saint Paul, Minnesota - Tommies, name refers to St. Thomas Aquinas, costumed mascot is Tommy the Tomcat.
- College of Saint Benedict and Saint John's University, Minnesota - The College of Saint Benedict for women are called the Bennies representing Benedict of Nursia, and Saint John's University for men are called the Johnnies, representing John of Patmos.

==== Saints (Catholic) ====
- Aquinas College, Grand Rapids, Michigan - Mascot is a St. Bernard dog
- Carroll College, Helena, Montana - Mascot is "Halo"", a St. Bernard dog
- College of St. Joseph, Rutland, Vermont - Fighting Saints (Closed due to financial problems in 2019)
- College of St. Scholastica, Duluth, Minnesota - St. Bernard dog used in some fan items
- Emmanuel College, Boston, Massachusetts - Mascot is "Halo", a St. Bernard dog
- Holy Cross College, Notre Dame, Indiana - Mascot is "Basil", a St. Bernard dog
- Marymount University, Arlington, Virginia - mascot is "Bernie" the Dog
- Maryville University, Town and Country, Missouri - Maryville Saints, mascot "Louis" the St. Bernard
- Mercyhurst North East, North East, Pennsylvania
- Our Lady of the Lake University, San Antonio, Texas - Logos include halos and angel wings.
- Saint Martin's University, Lacey, Washington - Saint Martin's Saints, logo is a knight's helmet
- Siena College, Loudonville, New York - Siena Saints, mascot Bernie "Saint" Bernard
- Siena Heights University, Adrian, Michigan - mascot is "Halo the Husky Dog"
- Thomas More College, Crestview Hills, Kentucky - mascot "Tommy Mo," or "Tommy Moria," a Renaissance Englishman in motley parachute pants.

=== Catholic K-12 schools ===
- Archbishop Bergan High School, Fremont, Nebraska - Knights, School logo includes a cross
- Archbishop Williams High School, Braintree, Massachusetts – Bishops
- Bishop England High School, Charleston, South Carolina - Battling Bishops
- Mount Michael Benedictine Abbey and High School, Elkhorn, Nebraska - Knights, School logo is a Benedictine cross
- Sacred Heart Academy, Louisville, Kentucky - Valkyries
- St. Bernard's High School, Fitchburg, Massachusetts – Bernardians
- St. Pius X High School, Albuquerque, New Mexico - Sartans is a reference to the school's namesake.
- Shanley High School, Fargo, North Dakota - Deacons
- Thomas More Prep-Marian, Hays, Kansas - Monarchs, Logo includes a cross

==== Crusaders (Catholic) ====
- Bishop Fenwick High School, Peabody, Massachusetts
- Brother Martin High School, New Orleans, Louisiana
- Cathedral High School, St. Cloud, Minnesota
- Central Catholic High School, Grand Island, Nebraska
- Kapaun Mt. Carmel Catholic High School, Wichita, Kansas
- Lowell Catholic, Lowell, Massachusetts
- Marian High School, Omaha, Nebraska
- Catholic Memorial High School, Waukesha, Wisconsin
- Bishop Kenny High School, Jacksonville, Florida
- Bergen Catholic High School, Oradell, New Jersey

==== Friars ====
- Archbishop Curley High School, Baltimore, Maryland
- Austin Catholic Preparatory School, Detroit, Michigan(Closed 1978)
- Bishop Lynch High School, Dallas, Texas
- Fenwick High School, Oak Park, Illinois
- Malvern Preparatory School, Malvern, Pennsylvania
- Monsignor Bonner High School, Drexel Hill, Pennsylvania
- St. Anthony High School, Jersey City, New Jersey
- St. Anthony High School, South Huntington, New York
- Servite High School, Anaheim, California

==== Saints (Catholic K-12) ====
- Bishop Dwenger High School, Fort Wayne, Indiana
- Canterbury School, New Milford, Connecticut
- Central Catholic High School, Bloomington, Illinois
- DeSales High School, Geneva, New York
- Mormon Trail Jr./Sr. High School, Humeston, Iowa
- Notre Dame Preparatory High School, Scottsdale, Arizona, mascot St. Bernard
- San Juan Diego Catholic High School, Austin, Texas
- Santa Clara High School, Oxnard, California
- St. Anthony High School, Long Beach, California
- St. Augustine High School, San Diego, California
- Saint Bernard School, Uncasville, Connecticut
- St. Bernard's High School, Fitchburg, Massachusetts
- St. Bernard Preparatory School, Cullman, Alabama
- Saint Dominic Academy, Auburn and Lewiston, Maine
- St. Louis Catholic High School, Lake Charles, Louisiana
- St. Mary's Central High School, Bismarck, North Dakota
- St. Mary's High School, Annapolis, Maryland
- Saint Mary High School, Westfield, Massachusetts
- St. Mary's School for the Deaf, Buffalo, New York
- St. Patrick's High School, Maysville, Kentucky
- Saint Raphael Academy, Pawtucket, Rhode Island
- St. Thomas Aquinas High School, Overland Park, Kansas
- St. Thomas Aquinas High School, Dover, New Hampshire
- St. Vincent's Academy, Savannah, Georgia
- Saints John Neumann and Maria Goretti Catholic High School, Philadelphia, Pennsylvania
- Saratoga Central Catholic High School, Saratoga Springs, New York
- Seton Catholic Central, Binghamton, New York
- Seton High School, Cincinnati, Ohio
- Tuscarawas Central Catholic High School, New Philadelphia, Ohio
- Xavier College Preparatory High School, Palm Desert, California
- Xavier High School, Cedar Rapids, Iowa

=== Protestant colleges and universities ===
- Earlham College, Richmond, Indiana - Quakers, costumed mascot is "Big Earl"
- Eureka College, Eureka, Illinois - Red Devils, imagery includes a devil's head and a pitchfork. Ronald Reagan was an alumnus, playing on the football team.
- Guilford College, Greensboro, North Carolina - Guilford Quakers, mascot "Nathan the Quaker"
- Ohio Wesleyan, Delaware, Ohio - Battling Bishops was selected in 1925 as the team nickname in a contest sponsored by the journalism fraternity.
- Limestone College, Gaffney, South Carolina - Limestone Saints, mascot "Bernie De' Saint", as St. Bernard dog.
- Meredith College, Raleigh, North Carolina - Avenging Angels, the undergraduate programs being for women only
- Mid-American Christian University, Oklahoma City Oklahoma - Evangels, logo is a Legionary
- New Hope Christian College, Eugene, Oregon - Deacons (currently intramural sports only)
- North Carolina Wesleyan College, Rocky Mount, North Carolina - Battling Bishops
- Randall University, Moore, Oklahoma - Saints
- Wake Forest University, Winston-Salem, North Carolina - Wake Forest Demon Deacons, mascot the Demon Deacon

==== Name changes ====
- Bloomfield College, Bloomfield, New Jersey - Deacons changed to the Bears in 2014
- Elon University, Elon, North Carolina - originally the Fightin’ Christians, changed to the Phoenix in 2000
- Evangel University, Springfield, Missouri - Crusaders removed in March 2021, replaced by the Valor.
- Lincoln Christian University, Lincoln, Illinois - Preachers (men) and Angels (women) changed to Red Lion in 2009
- Valparaiso University, Valparaiso, Indiana - Uhlans (1931-1942), Crusaders (1942-2021), changed to Beacons in 2021.

=== Protestant K-12 schools ===
- Christian Academy of Louisville, Louisville, Kentucky has four campuses, two of which are Centurions (logo is a soldier with a cross on his helmet) and one is Saints
- Christian Life Academy, Baton Rouge, Louisiana - Crusaders
- Shannon Forest Christian School, Greenville, South Carolina - Crusaders
- University Christian School, Jacksonville, Florida - Fighting Christians, mascot a Christian Knight

==== Quakers (Protestant) ====
- Brooklyn Friends School, Brooklyn, New York
- Carolina Friends School, Durham, North Carolina
- Friends Academy, Locust Valley, New York
- Friends School of Baltimore, Baltimore, Maryland
- Moses Brown School, Providence, Rhode Island
- Sidwell Friends School, Bethesda, Maryland and Washington, D.C.
- William Penn Charter School, Philadelphia, Pennsylvania
- Wilmington Friends School, Wilmington, Delaware

==== Saints (Protestant) ====
- All Saints’ Episcopal School, Fort Worth, Texas
- All Saints Academy, Winter Haven, Florida - mascot is a St. Bernard dog
- Baytown Christian Academy, Baytown, Texas
- Briarcrest Christian School, Shelby County, Tennessee; the school was founded as a segregation academy in the 1970s
- Calvary Academy, Springfield, Illinois
- Calvary Baptist Christian High School, San Fernando, California
- Christian Academy, Myrtle Beach, South Carolina
- Clarendon Hall School, Summerton, South Carolina
- Concordia Preparatory School, Towson, Maryland
- Faith Christian Academy, Pasadena, Texas
- Faith Christian School, Foreston, Minnesota
- Faith Heritage School, Syracuse, New York
- First Baptist Academy, Dallas, Texas
- Greenville Christian School, Greenville, Mississippi - founded as a segregation academy
- Harvest Christian Academy, Keller, Texas
- Hillcrest Christian School, Thousand Oaks, California
- Lutheran High School, Indianapolis, Indiana - mascot "Louis", a St. Bernard
- Lighthouse Christian Academy, Santa Monica, California
- Lima Christian School, Lima, New York
- Mountain View Christian School, Las Vegas, Nevada
- Mt. Juliet Christian Academy, Mt. Juliet, Tennessee
- North Clackamas Christian School, Oregon City, Oregon
- Oklahoma Christian School, Edmond, Oklahoma
- Patrician Academy, Butler, Alabama
- Philadelphia Christian High School, Conyers, Georgia
- Prentiss Christian School, Prentiss, Mississippi
- Resurrection Christian School, Charlotte, North Carolina
- St. James School, Maryland, Hagerstown, Maryland
- St. Martin's Episcopal School, Metairie, Louisiana
- Saint Mary's School, Raleigh, North Carolina
- St. Paul's Episcopal School, Mobile, Alabama
- St. Paul's Lutheran School, Ocala, Florida
- St. Paul's Lutheran High School, Concordia, Missouri
- St. Stephen's & St. Agnes School, Alexandria, Virginia
- St. Thomas' Episcopal School, Houston, TexasSt. Paul's Episcopal School
- Seattle Lutheran High School, Seattle, Washington
- Shiloh Christian School, Springdale, Arkansas
- St. Andrew's School Barrington, Rhode Island
- St. Andrew's Episcopal School, Ridgeland, Mississippi
- St. Anne's-Belfield School, Charlottesville, Virginia
- St. Christopher's School, Richmond, Virginia
- St. Cloud Christian School, St. Cloud, Minnesota
- Sylva-Bay Academy, Bay Springs, Mississippi
- Trinity Episcopal Day School, Natchez, Mississippi
- Trinity Lutheran School, Bend, Oregon
- Trinity Preparatory School, Winter Park, FloridaSylva-Bay Academy
- Vail Christian High School, Edwards, Colorado

=== Other religions ===
- Yeshiva University, New York City - Maccabees

== Private non-sectarian schools ==
- Converse University, Concordia, Missouri - Valkyries
- Dickinson College, Carlisle, Pennsylvania - Red Devils
- Duke University, Durham, North Carolina - Blue Devils, derived from a French military unit in World War I.
- Fairleigh Dickinson University, Florham Park, New Jersey - Devils
- Flagler College, St. Augustine, Florida - Saints
- St. Lawrence University, Canton, New York - Saints (Founded by the Universalist Church of America, but now non-denominational)
- University of Pennsylvania, Philadelphia, Pennsylvania - The Penn Quakers name is more historical than religious
- University of the Sciences, Philadelphia, Pennsylvania - Devils, "Drake the Devil"

== Public schools ==
=== Colleges and universities ===
- Arizona State University, Phoenix, Arizona - Sun Devils, mascot Sparky the Sun Devil
- California University of Pennsylvania, California, Pennsylvania - Vulcans
- Central Connecticut State, New Britain, Connecticut - Blue Devils
- Lurleen B. Wallace Community College, Andalusia, Greenville, and Opp, Alabama - Saints
- Mission College, Santa Clara, California - Saints
- Mt. Hood Community College, Gresham, Oregon - Saints, St. Bernard mascot
- North Country Community College, Saranac Lake, New York - Saints, St. Bernard mascot
- Northwestern State University of Louisiana, Natchitoches, Louisiana - Demons, mascot Vic the Demon.
- San Diego Mesa College, San Diego, California - Olympians
- Santa Fe College, Gainesville, Florida - Saints, St. Bernard mascot
- Seward County Community College, Liberal, Kansas - Saints, mascot "Louie the Saint", crusader imagery
- Shawnee Community College, Ullin, Illinois - Saints, St. Bernard mascot

=== Secondary schools ===
==== Crusaders ====
- Buhler High School, Buhler, Kansas
- Wellington High School, Wellington, Kansas

==== Deacons ====
- St. Paul High School, St. Paul, Virginia - Deacons

==== Demons/Devils ====
- Atkins High School, Atkins, Arkansas - Red Devils
- Batavia High School, Batavia, New York - Blue Devils
- Brockport High School, Brockport, New York - Blue Devils
- Brunswick High School (Brunswick, Ohio), Brunswick, Ohio - Blue Devils
- Decatur Community High School, Oberlin, Kansas - Red Devils
- Dolgeville Central School District, Dolgeville, New York - Blue Devils
- Española Valley High School, Española, New Mexico - Sundevils
- Ewing High School, Ewing, NJ -Blue Devils
- Franklin Central School, Franklin, Delaware County, New York - Purple Devils
- Liberty High School, Liberty, South Carolina - Red Devils
- Kenmore West Senior High School, Kenmore, New York - Blue Devils
- Perkins-Tryon High School, Perkins, Oklahoma - Demons
- Plattsmouth High School, Plattsmouth, Nebraska - Blue Devils
- Port Barre High School, Port Barre, Louisiana - Red Devils
- Rancocas Valley Regional High School, Mount Holly, New Jersey - Red Devils
- Sedan, Kansas - Blue Devils
- Victor Senior High School, Victor, New York - Blue Devils
- Washington High School, Washington, Iowa - Demons
- Wayne High School, Wayne, Nebraska - Blue Devils
- Wynot Public Schools, Wynot, Nebraska - Blue Devils

==== Quakers ====
- Eastern High School, Lansing, Michigan
- Franklin High School, Portland, Oregon - Changed from Quakers to Lightning in 2019
- Franklin High School, Seattle, Washington
- Horace Greeley High School, Chappaqua, New York
- Millville Area Junior Senior High School, Columbia County, Pennsylvania
- Moorestown High School, Moorestown, New Jersey
- New Philadelphia High School, New Philadelphia, Ohio
- Orchard Park High School, Orchard Park, New York
- Plainfield High School, Plainfield, Indiana
- Quaker Valley High School, Leetsdale, Pennsylvania
- Salem Junior/Senior High School, Salem, Ohio

==== Saints ====
- Butterfield-Odin Public School, Butterfield, Minnesota
- Calhoun County High School, St. Matthews, South Carolina
- Cedar Grove High School, Ellenwood, Georgia
- Churchville-Chili High School, Churchville, New York
- Delta High School, Clarksburg, California
- Interlake High School, Bellevue, Washington
- Jefferson High School, Edgewater, Colorado
- La Salle High School, St. Ignace, Michigan
- Locke High School, Los Angeles, California
- Melcher-Dallas High School, Melcher-Dallas, Iowa
- St. Ansgar High School, St. Ansgar, Iowa
- St. Charles High School, St. Charles, Minnesota
- St. Clair High School, East China Township, Michigan
- St. Croix Falls High School, St. Croix Falls, Wisconsin
- St. Helena High School, St. Helena, California
- St. James High School, St. James, Minnesota
- St. Michaels Middle/High School, St. Michaels, Maryland
- St. Paul High School, St. Paul, Arkansas
- Saint Peter High School, Saint Peter, Minnesota
- Saint Regis Falls Central School, Saint Regis Falls, New York
- San Dimas High School, San Dimas, California
- Sandalwood High School, Jacksonville, Florida
- Santa Ana High School, Santa Ana, California
- Santa Fe South High School, Oklahoma City, Oklahoma - mascot St. Bernard
- Santa Maria High School, Santa Maria, California
- Santa Teresa High School, San Jose, California
- Selma High School, Selma, Alabama
- Southern Wayne High School, Dudley, North Carolina
- Thornwell Charter School, Clinton, South Carolina
- West Feliciana High School, St. Francisville, Louisiana

==== Valkyries ====
Schools where the boy's teams are Vikings and the girl's teams are Valkyries, mythical figures in Norse mythology

- Bigfork High School, Bigfork, Montana
- Petersburg High School, Petersburg, Alaska

== Professional sports teams and franchises ==
- Fort Myers Miracle, Minor League Baseball - became the Fort Myers Mighty Mussels in 2019
- Los Angeles Angels, Major League Baseball - Named after the city of Los Angeles
- New Jersey Devils, National Hockey League
  - The Binghamton Devils became the Utica Comets when the team moved but remain affiliated with the New Jersey Devils.
- New Orleans Saints, National Football League - The franchise was named "the Saints" by popular vote on November 1, 1966—All Saint's Day. The name refers to the popular New Orleans gospel / jazz tune "When the Saints Go Marching In".
- Sacramento Kings, National Basketball Association - Mascot is Slamson the Lion, an allusion to the Old Testament figure Samson.
- San Antonio Missions, Minor League Baseball
- San Diego Padres, Major League Baseball - refers to the Franciscan friars who founded San Diego
- Stockton Thunder, ECHL - uses the Norse god Thor as mascot

== Crusader mascot controversy ==
Many Catholic, and some Protestant schools adopted the Crusader for their teams. The University of the Incarnate Word decided in 2004 that its Crusader mascot was inappropriate for its multicultural mission. Corlis McGee, president of Eastern Nazarene College, said, "There's a growing awareness that the connotation of the word has changed, and the Crusader no longer represents the positive message of Christian love we want to share with the world."

Other universities have decided to keep the mascot as a way to honor their histories and constantly remind students to "communicate our desire to bring the good news and cross into every situation we encountered." The remaining college-level Crusaders are Belmont Abbey College (Belmont, North Carolina), Christendom College (Front Royal, Virginia), College of the Holy Cross (Worcester, Massachusetts), and Madonna University (Livonia, Michigan).

Prior Crusaders name changes
School name	City	State	New Mascot	Year Changed	Notes
Alvernia University	Reading	Pennsylvania	Golden Wolves	2017	Sr. Madonna Marie Harvath, a member of the Bernardine Sisters stated; "The idea of changing the name has been brewing for quite some time because there was a lot of prejudice and persecution associated with the Crusades, and that's not what Alvernia stands for."
Bushnell University	Eugene	Oregon	Beacons	2020	The change coincided with Northwest Christian University becoming Bushnell.
Capital University	Bexley	Ohio	Comets	2021	Although the change was based upon recognition that the name had become outdated and divisive, there was pushback from alumni.
Clarke University	Dubuque	Iowa	The Pride	2017	
Eastern Nazarene College	Quincy	Massachusetts	Lions	2009	The college president stated that the connotations of crusader have changed over the years to become associated with atrocities.
Evangel University	Springfield	Missouri	Valor	2021	The university president stated; "Today, we recognize that the Crusader often inhibits the ability of students and alumni to proudly represent the university in their areas of global work and ministry."
North Greenville University	Tigerville	South Carolina	Trailblazers	2024	
Northwest Nazarene University	Nampa	Idaho	Nighthawks	2017	
Point Loma Nazarene University	Point Loma, San Diego	California	Sea Lions	2003	
Susquehanna University	Selinsgrove	Pennsylvania	River Hawks	2015	
University of the Incarnate Word	San Antonio	Texas	Cardinals	2004	
Valparaiso University	Valparaiso	Indiana	Beacons	2021	
Wheaton College	Wheaton	Illinois	The Thunder	2000	Billy Graham, who called his annual evangelistic campaigns "Crusades", was the most notable alumnus of the school.

== See also ==
- Collegiate sport ritual in the United States
- List of association football mascots
- List of mascots
- List of sports team names and mascots derived from indigenous peoples
- Native American mascot controversy
