= Ryan Durand =

American football player (born 1985)

No. 77
- Position: Guard

Personal information
- Born: November 17, 1985 (age 40); Worcester, Massachusetts, U.S.
- Listed height: 6 ft 5 in (1.96 m)
- Listed weight: 303 lb (137 kg)

Career information
- High school: St. Bernard's (Fitchburg, Massachusetts)
- College: Syracuse
- NFL draft: 2009: 7th round, 239th overall pick

Career history
- Tennessee Titans (2009–2012); Miami Dolphins (2012); Kansas City Chiefs (2013)*
- * Offseason or practice squad member only

Awards and highlights
- Second-team All-Big East (2008)

Career NFL statistics
- Games played: 1
- Stats at Pro Football Reference

Ryan James Durand (born November 17, 1985) is an American former professional football player who was a guard in the National Football League (NFL). He played college football for the Syracuse Orange and was selected by the Tennessee Titans in the seventh round of the 2009 NFL draft.

== Early life ==
Durand attended St. Bernard’s High School in Fitchburg, and was a four-year football letter-winner. He was selected as team captain for both his junior and senior years. Durand rated fifth on PrepStar’s top-10 list for offensive linemen in the East and PrepStar All-East Region selection in 2003. He was labeled to the top offensive lineman and fifth overall prospect in New England by Rivals.com. Additionally, Durand was selected the sixth- best player in New England by SuperPrep. In 2003, he was Named Worcester Telegram & Gazette First Defensive All-Star and Boston Globe All-Conference selection. As a freshman, Durand earned team MVP award, defensive MVP as a sophomore, and the Coaches Award as a junior and senior. Also, Durand received the Lineman award as a senior. Durand lettered in track and field three seasons where he specialized in the shot put and discus. Lastly, Durand was a state semifinalist in the shot put as a senior.

== College career ==
Durand graduated from Syracuse with a 3.75 GPA and a degree in exercise science in December 2008. The four-time Big East All-Academic selection’s post-football endeavors include going back to school to obtain a degree in physical therapy. As a senior in 2008, Durand started all 12 games at right guard and was tabbed a second-team All-Big East selection. Was invited to play in the East-West Shrine Game. Additionally, Durand was instrumental in helping running back Curtis Brinkley become the eighth different player in Syracuse history to record 1,000 rushing yards in a season. As a junior, Durand started 11 games at right guard and protected an offensive unit that amassed an average of 291.9 yards per game. And as a sophomore in 2006, Durand started all 12 games at right guard. Durand was also one of only 13 players to start every game and was the only offensive lineman to start every game at the same position. As a redshirt freshman in 2005, he played in seven games and made the travel squad for all 12 contests.

As a freshman, Durand was redshirted for the season and saw action on the scout team. Prior to the NFL Draft, he was accepted to study at his top post-grad choice, Springfield College. Durand’s solid academic record and character put him in contention for the prestigious Vincent dePaul Draddy Trophy given to college football player with the best combination of academics, community service and on-field performance. He was a semifinalist for the award as a senior.

== Professional career ==
Durand made his professional debut in a victory at Dallas on October 10, 2010. Selected in the 2009 NFL draft in the seventh round by the Tennessee Titans, Durand stayed with the Titans for three years until getting injured during the Saints and Titans preseason game in 2012. He received an injury settlement from the Titans and eight weeks later, was signed to the active roster by the Miami Dolphins. In January 2013 Durand became the first offensive linemen signed by the Kansas City Chiefs new coach, Andy Reid.
