= Mike Kushmerek =

American politician

Michael Kushmerek
- Kushmerek in 2025

Member of the Massachusetts House of Representatives from the 3rd Worcester district
- Incumbent
- Assumed office January 3, 2021
- Preceded by: Stephan Hay

Member of the Fitchburg City Council
- In office 2014–2021

Personal details
- Born: 1986 (age 39–40) Massachusetts
- Party: Democratic
- Education: Fitchburg State University
- Website: www.mike4rep.com/about-mike

Michael P. Kushmerek (born 1986) is an American politician in Fitchburg, Massachusetts representing 3rd Worcester District (Fitchburg) in the Massachusetts state house of representatives.

== Early life ==
Kushmerek grew up in Saugus, attended Fitchburg State University, where he received a bachelor's degree in history and political science in 2008 and a master's degree in history in 2013.

== Political career ==
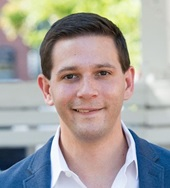
Kushmerek in 2021

Kushmerek was elected ward 4 representative in the Fitchburg City council in 2014, in 2016 He was elected city council president, in 2019 he was elected councilor at large.

In 2020, Kushmerek was elected to represent the 3rd Worcester District (Fitchburg and Lunenburg, Precinct B) in the Massachusetts House of Representatives to succeed fellow Democrat Stephan Hay, defeating Republican Glenn Fossa. He was sworn in on January 6, 2021.

== Personal life ==
Kushmerek is married to Carissa (Scottfenton) Kushmerek. Before his election, he worked as a director at Northeastern University, Worcester Polytechnic Institute, and Fitchburg State University.

== See also ==
- 2021–2022 Massachusetts legislature
- 2020 Massachusetts House of Representatives election
