= Stephan Hay =

Massachusetts politician

Member of the Massachusetts House of Representatives from the 3rd Worcester district
- In office March 9, 2016 – January 3, 2021
- Preceded by: Stephen DiNatale
- Succeeded by: Michael Kushmerek

Personal details
- Party: Democratic Party
- Spouse: Cynthia Hay
- Education: Clark University BA; Rutgers University MFA

Stephan Hay is an American politician who represented the 3rd Worcester district in the Massachusetts House of Representatives from 2016 to 2021. A member of the Democratic Party, his district included the towns of Fitchburg and Lunenburg.

== Political career ==
Prior to his election to the state legislature, Hay served on the Fitchburg City Council for eighteen years, including ten as council president. In 2016, Hay ran in the special election to succeed Representative Stephen DiNatale, who had resigned to serve as mayor of Fitchburg. He won the Democratic primary with 61.7% of the vote and defeated Republican Dean Tran by 125 votes in the special general election. He took office on March 9, 2016.

Hay served on a number of committees during his time in the House, including as House Chair of the Joint Committee on Labor and Workforce Development.

In February 2020, Hay announced that he would retire at the end of his term. He was succeeded by fellow Fitchburg Democrat Michael Kushmerek.

=== Committee Assignments ===
==== 189th General Court (2016) ====
- Joint Committee on Election Laws
- Joint Committee on Municipalities and Regional Government

190th General Court (2017-2018)

- Joint Committee on Economic Development and Emerging Technologies
- Joint Committee on Higher Education
- Joint Committee on Marijuana Policy
- Joint Committee on Municipalities and Regional Government

191st General Court (2019-2020)

- Vice Chair, Joint Committee on Labor and Workforce Development
- Joint Committee on Higher Education
- Joint Committee on Public Safety and Homeland Security
- Joint Committee on Revenue

== See also ==
- 2019–2020 Massachusetts legislature
