= Ikävalko =

Ikävalko is a Finnish surname. Notable people with the surname include:

- Lempi Ikävalko (1901–1994), Finnish writer, poet, actress, and performance artist
- Niko Ikävalko (born 1988), Finnish footballer
