= Peltoniemi =

Peltoniemi is a Finnish surname. Notable people with the surname include:

- Teuvo Peltoniemi (born 1950), Finnish writer, journalist, researcher, and educator
- Asko Peltoniemi (born 1963), Finnish pole vaulter
