= George Bourque =

American politician (1913–2011)

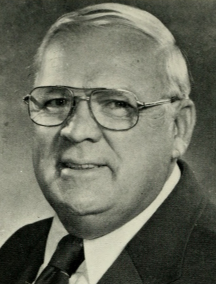
- Bourque as a member of the Massachusetts House of Representatives

Member of the Massachusetts House of Representatives
- In office 1969–1990
- Preceded by: Peter J. Levanti
- Succeeded by: Emile J. Goguen
- Constituency: 14th Worcester district (1969–1974); 15th Worcester district (1975–1978); 3rd Worcester district (1979–1990)

Mayor of Fitchburg, Massachusetts
- In office 1960–1968
- Preceded by: Hedley Bray
- Succeeded by: William G. Flynn

Personal details
- Born: January 19, 1913 Joggins, Nova Scotia, Canada
- Died: May 2, 2011 (aged 98) Leominster, Massachusetts
- Party: Democratic

George J. Bourque (January 19, 1913 – May 2, 2011) was a Canadian-born American politician who was mayor of Fitchburg, Massachusetts from 1960 to 1968 and a member of the Massachusetts House of Representatives from 1969 to 1990.

== Early life ==
Bourque was born in Joggins, Nova Scotia on January 19, 1913. He was the fourth of thirteen children born to Philias and Madeline (Fagan) and Bourque. The family moved to Fitchburg shortly after Bourque was born. Philias Bourque worked as a coal miner in Nova Scotia but became a horse trainer after moving to Fitchburg. Bourque left school at the age of sixteen to help support his family. He eventually opened an industrial catering business in Fitchburg.

== Politics ==
Bourque was a member of Fitchburg's parks commission for one year and its city council for two years. In 1949, he defeated incumbent mayor Hedley Bray 88,43 votes to 8,204. During his tenure, the city launched a school-building plan that resulted in the construction of two elementary and one middle school. He was reelected three times, but was upset in 1967 by 25 year old city councilor William G. Flynn.

Bourque served eleven terms (1969 to 1990) in the Massachusetts House of Representatives. He helped secure state and federal funding for many construction projects, including the Fitchburg Public Library, Fitchburg State University, and ten elderly and low-income housing projects.

== Personal life and death ==
Bourque was married to the former Emilia LeBlanc for 73 years. They had three sons and two daughters. He founded Fitchburg's Little League Baseball and Babe Ruth Leagues and the Fitchburg Civic Days. He was a licensed pilot who owned a Cessna. He died on May 2, 2011 at Leominster Hospital in Leominster, Massachusetts.
