= Lempi =

Lempi is a feminine Finnish given name. Notable people with the name include:

- Lempi Ikävalko (1901–1994), Finnish writer, poet, actress, and artist
- Lempi Tuomi (1882–1958), Finnish politician
