= St. Bernard's High School (Fitchburg, Massachusetts) =

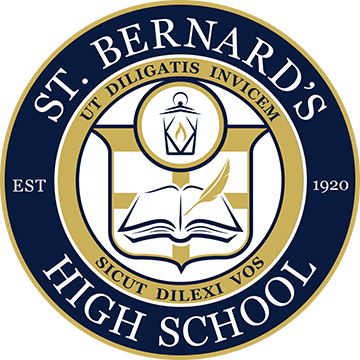

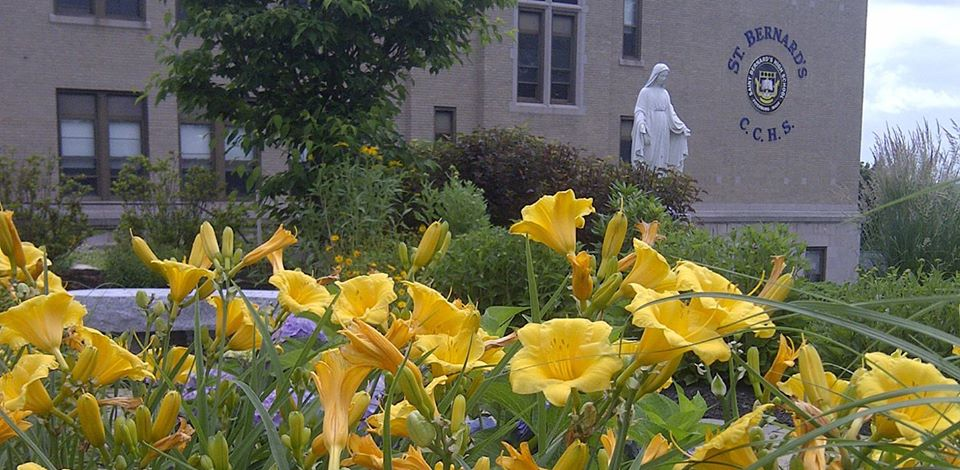
- View of St Bernard's High School.

Location
- 45 Harvard Street; Fitchburg, Massachusetts 01420; United States; 42°34′38″N 71°47′4″W

Information
- Type: Private, co-educational
- Religious affiliation: Roman Catholic
- Patron saint: Bernard of Clairvaux
- Established: 1920
- Principal: Rob Carlin
- Grades: 9–12
- Enrollment: 222 (2026-2027)
- Colors: Blue and gold
- Athletics conference: Central Massachusetts Athletic Conference
- Team name: Bernardians
- Accreditation: NEASC
- Newspaper: Blue and Gold
- Yearbook: Bernardian
- Annual tuition: $11,125 (2026-2027)
- Website: stbernardshighschool.org

St. Bernard's High School is a private Catholic high school in Fitchburg, Massachusetts.

== History ==
Founded in 1920 to educate young women, the need for a Catholic high school in the Fitchburg area was recognized by Bishop Thomas Daniel Beaven, and then materialized during the pastorate of Monsignor James J. Donnelly. The religious institute, founded by Nano Nagle, called the Presentation Sisters were tasked with beginning the school.

In 1925, Donnelly purchased the Page Estate in Fitchburg, which became a convent for the Sisters, and in July 1926, construction of a nearby building would become the St. Bernard's High School campus. It opened its doors on September 4, 1927, with eight Sisters assigned as instructors.

In 1946, athletic venues were constructed, beginning with the football field, known as the "Bernardian Bowl." In 1964, a quarter-mile running track was added, as well as an additional building wing containing a cafeteria, chapel, classrooms, laboratories, library, and offices. In 1980, the school's Activity Complex opened to contain a gymnasiums, locker rooms, and offices.

Originally a parish school, it was run by the Roman Catholic Diocese of Worcester since the 1980s. St. Bernard's High School won a bid to privatize and operate independently with a board of trustees, as of 2020.

== Athletics ==
Home of the Bernardians, both basketball and football teams have enjoyed success in recent years. The basketball team won the 1998 Division II State Championship, defeating Boston Latin School, and five Sectional Championships: 1997, 1998, 2006, 2008, 2009, 2012, and 2013. The football team has won three Division VIII Massachusetts State Football Championship: 1997, 2018, and 2019.

== Notable alumni ==
- Jacques Cesaire (did not graduate), professional football player
- Stephen DiNatale (1970), politician
- Ryan Durand (2004), professional football player
- John Legere (1976), businessman
- Joseph F. Murphy Jr. (1961), judge
- Milt Morin (1961), professional football player
- Edmund F. O'Connor (1939), United States Air Force officer
- Peg O'Connor (1983), professor

== See also ==
- Religious symbolism in U.S. sports team names and mascots
