= Senator Stanton (disambiguation) =

Joseph Stanton Jr. (1739–1821) was a U.S. Senator from Rhode Island from 1790 to 1793. Senator Stanton may also refer to:

- Benjamin Stanton (1809–1872), Ohio State Senate
- George W. Stanton (1903–1952), Massachusetts State Senate
- Henry Brewster Stanton (1805–1887), New York State Senate
- William Henry Stanton (Pennsylvania politician) (1843–1900), Pennsylvania State Senate
- Zed S. Stanton (1848–1921), Vermont State Senate
