= Collegiate sport ritual in the United States =

There are a multitude of rituals associated with collegiate sporting events across the United States. Varying by sport, demographics, and location, sporting rituals often become essential to the preparation, organization, and game-day experience. In fact, many would argue that rituals are the experience.

== Ritualization in sports ==
Rituals have become an integral part of sporting events in the United States. Traditionally, before games, students and fans engage in a variety of pregame celebrations including pep rallies, tailgating, and informal gatherings. This ritual of carousing continues throughout the game into the postgame celebrations. The ritualization of sporting events involves numerous individuals including the fans, players, and crews in charge of maintaining and preparing the fields and stadiums.

The importance of ritual in sporting events cannot be understated. Fields and stadiums must be properly maintained and prepared before game day. Fans not only spend hours preparing for game day, often the entire day is dedicated to game day celebrations. Fans even have many pregame rituals that include superstitious activities, such as dressing in certain clothes, making specific foods, and even sitting in particular seats in hopes of their team winning. For many of the players, rituals have become superstitious; however, it is believed that the players don't rely on superstitions to win, but are used in hopes of continuing their winning streaks or good luck. After all the preparation and game-play, the ritual continues in the form of festivities and celebrations.

== Understanding rituals in sport ==
The origins of rituals and how and why an individual partakes in traditions vary from person to person. Studies through the use of interviews have identified that individuals may seek to join in traditions as a means to fit in culturally. Traditions are often a means of identity, and joining in specific traditions or trends is a way to form a cultural identity that is similar to your surrounding environment. Often individuals join in a particular activity or ritual, such as dressing in team colors or going to rallies, as a result of the influences around them; being family, friends, and the surrounding social environment. Culturally important activities gain the support of the surrounding community and fans. The compiled support for rituals results in an enterprise. These rituals become both tradition and business, as many universities and communities make profit off of ritual events (i.e. the trend of going to games and purchasing tickets and team gear). Over time, starting in the 1900s, as varsity team popularity grew, so did the popularity of commercialization, therefore, starting fan support and traditions.

== Various sport rituals ==
Every sport maintains different rituals. Occurrences of rituals in every sport will typically be carried out over pre-game, game-play, and post-game rituals. While there are specific rituals associated with many teams, the organization of game play often determines the type of rituals that take place. Rituals will often find comfortable homes in the time between game-play. Whether the game is divided into rounds, quarters, innings or another form of time keepings, the time between is filled with either a performance by cheer groups, the band, or other organizations, or participation from within the crowd in attendance through body movements, chants, or cheers. However, rituals are not isolated to the time between game-play, and silences, cheering, or intimidation and taunting can become part of the experience. Many sport participants and observers would be left with a feeling of absence if they didn't occur. Many passionate sport observers feel that the outcomes of particular games are of the most importance in their lives, and will conduct rituals in an attempt to increase the chance that their wishes come true. The rituals vary although their importance to those involved remains consistent.

Members of Alpha Phi Omega carry the world's largest Texas flag during a pregame ceremony at a University of Texas football game. Another notable flag-related tradition is that of Washington State University; a group of alumni has arranged for a school flag to be flown at every broadcast of the football version of College GameDay since October 2003.

== Ritual in rivalry ==
Ritual is often in the history and rivalry between schools. Ritual surrounds major sporting events between universities that have a profound sense of competition amongst each other. From the trophies and bragging rights awarded to winning teams, to the hype and tradition centering on the game itself, many university teams and communities take part in the rituals surrounding rivalry games. One such example that has been prominent since 1900 is the rivalry between the University of Texas and the University of Oklahoma rivalry. Also known as the Red River Rivalry and Show Down, members of the teams and communities fight for both conference standing and national titles, but most importantly bragging rights. Played on a neutral field, the Longhorns and Sooners duke it out for the claim of the Red River for the year. One example of similar intensity is the Iron Bowl, the football rivalry between the University of Alabama and Auburn University. These teams play for a trophy, but more importantly ownership and bragging rights of the state. A further example of ritual within rivalry is the passing of the Old Oaken Bucket between the football teams of Indiana University and Purdue University. These two teams have been exchanging this 100-year-old bucket for the past 76 years. Crowned with a paired I-P from the first game resulting in a tie, each year, the winning team adds a "P" or an "I" link to the chain of the bucket, growing by victories. Finally, said to be "filled with the spirits of gridiron men," the Little Brown Jug represents a steadfast football battle between the Universities of Michigan and Minnesota. This Little Brown Jug marked with a large "M" after a tie between the two teams in 1903 when the game was called two minutes because the storming of the field by fans has been the winning prize between the two rival teams. Painted, hidden, and returned to the winning team post victory, the jug has much history among the teams as the excitement and ritualistic passing of the jug is prominent.

== Ritual in school songs, cheers, and chants ==
Colleges and universities around the country, both big and small, are often represented by a fight song or chant. This ritualistic activity is seen from coast to coast as students, athletes, and fans join in unison chanting and singing in support of their school. These songs, which often date to the early 20th century, are means to identify with a team and show support. Often played at the start of games, in response to game occurrences, and after wins, these songs and chants are ritual to bringing unison among supporters and engaging fans’ teams. For example, the University of Southern California fight song "Fight On" was written in 1922 as a part of a spirit competition and now is sung at sporting events to cheer on USC teams. Texas A&M University has a series of chants, yells, and songs, along with a traditional fight song the University members identify with. These are led by Yell Leaders rather than cheerleaders in order to "intensify the crowd" at games and events. Texas A&M's chants are even used to rally up students before game day at events such as Midnight Yell Practice, which began to take its roots in the early 1900s, as yell leaders direct the ritual chants and old army cheers.

The Notre Dame Victory March is also a prominent example of tradition and ritual in unified support for a school through song and chant. Written in 1908, this song has stood the test of time as once trying to be rewritten by a different composer latter in the century. The refusal to promote and change songs shows dedication to the original, traditional fight song, which is played at Notre Dame events. Michigan State University's fight song was written in response to the rise in rivalry between university sports teams and served as a way to rally supports. The song was written by the yellmaster, Irving Lankey, as a way to further support for the football team and provide enthusiasm that stretched beyond the traditional band music available. One last example, The University of Oklahoma, has a fight song that dates back to 1905. The traditional song Boomer Sooner was written in order to raise crowd enthusiasm at football games and is still to this day sang as part of a team supporting and crowd involvement ritual. These songs and chants that are found at universities across the United States often have familiar tunes to them, because as the songs were written in the early 1900s, writers would often use songs previously used by other schools or already in existence as the basis for a fight song, such as the case with OU, using Yale's song but changing the words.

== Pep rallies and ceremonies as ritual ==
Some of the very distinct aspects of pre-game rituals are the pep rallies that occur at schools across the country. Although pep rallies occur during lower levels of schooling, collegiate pep rallies tend to be much larger, especially before big games. One example of such a heated ceremony is the Texas A&M Bonfire, which traditionally occurred prior to that school's annual matchup against the University of Texas in November. This event sparked a good deal of controversy within the A&M community after 12 students were killed during a collapse in 1999. The event has since moved off campus and has remained unaffiliated with the University for the past 10 years. It is also important to note that the A&M community glorifies the fallen Aggies with a memorial and most recently a DVD, which can be purchased on campus. A portion of the proceeds goes to the Bonfire Remembrance Fund. Auburn University has a tradition called the "Tiger Walk", which began in the 1960s. Prior to each home game, fans line Donahue Drive and cheer on the athletes as they walk from the athletes' dorm into the stadium for the game. The University of Texas students and fans also participated in a rally called the A&M Hex Rally, which was put on by the Texas Exes organization, before the UT–A&M rivalry ended for the time being with A&M's 2012 move to the Southeastern Conference. This ritualistic gathering, chanting, and cheering of Longhorn fans began as an attempt to break a winning streak of Texas A&M on the Aggies' home field.

== Group behaviors ==
Many universities also have traditions that dictate group behavior before, during, and after the football games. For example, many schools create "dress codes" for specific games each season. Penn State and Texas A&M host "white-outs" and "maroon-outs" during which the fans in the stands are expected to wear a specific color to create a sense of unity. Group behaviors aren't exclusive to the fans however. Players for the University of Notre Dame have a tradition of slapping a sign that reads "Play Like a Champion Today" as they leave the locker room and take the field. This tradition has been mimicked at other schools across the country.

Although not originally associated with the United States, one of the most iconic group behaviors in world sports—the haka of the New Zealand national rugby union team (the All Blacks)—has been appropriated by a few American college and high school teams, generally those with a significant Polynesian influence. (The Polynesian connection stems from the origin of New Zealand's indigenous Māori people, creators of the haka.) Most notably, the University of Hawaiʻi football team performed the All Blacks' haka as part of its pregame ritual before adopting its own dance, the haʻa, based on Native Hawaiian traditions. It is not uncommon to see individuals showing hand gestures and signals at sporting events or within a university environment. For example, Texas Tech fans are known for their "Guns Up" hand gesture that resembles the shape of an L made by the thumb and forefinger. This began in 1972 and has traditionally represented the Tech Raiders shooting their opponents down and is often used in celebration at games. The popularity has grown among Baylor students of the saying "Sic 'Em Bears" with the hand gesture that resembles a bear claw. The cheer with the corresponding gesture is often seen as students cheer together for Baylor teams during competition.

== Preparations/dress ==
In addition to the above-mentioned designated dress days, most fans tend to wear one of their team's primary colors to a game. This sort of dress, which is not unlike wearing "Sunday's Best" to Church, seems to assist in building commentary between fans and the team. Additionally, observations of the sidelines show that some coaches wear specific colors based on their duties on the field. In one photo of a Nebraska coach, we can see that he is wearing a less traditional color, probably so the players can identify him from the field easily when looking for the play call.

One unique form of ritual dress are buttons game- or team-specific slogans. For example, Penn State has the oldest and longest running slogan button program for a college football team, which has been run by a local bank since 1972. Other such programs exist at Missouri via the Boone County National Bank (1986-present) and Auburn University Bookstore.

== See also ==
- Occurrence of Religious Symbolism in U.S. Sports Team Names and Mascots
- Student section
