= Calvin M. Woodward =

United States manual training educator (1837–1915)

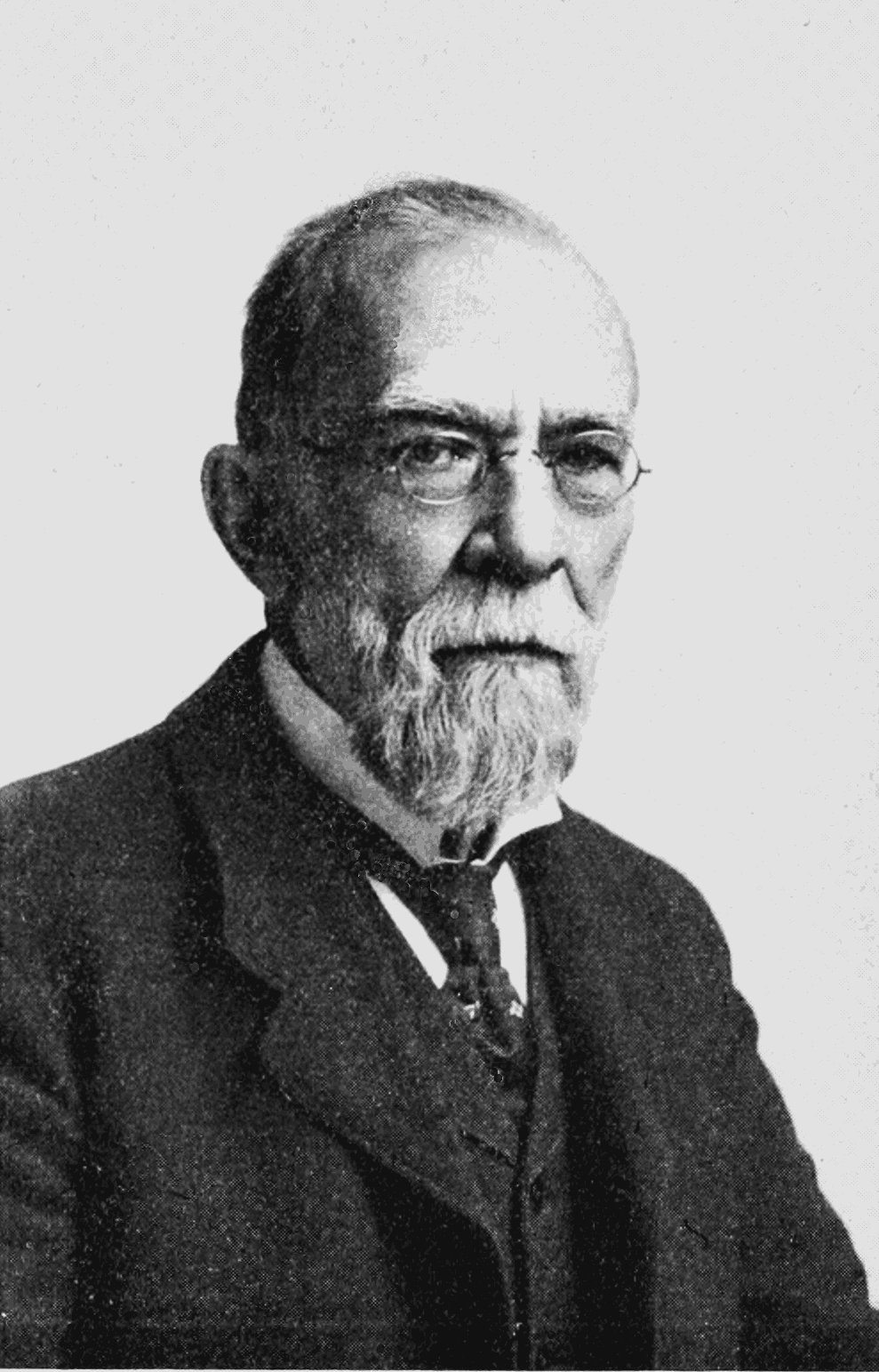
- Born: Calvin Milton Woodward; August 25, 1837; Fitchburg, Massachusetts
- Died: January 12, 1914 (aged 76); St. Louis, Missouri
- Education: Harvard College
- Occupation: Educator/Dean of Engineering
- Employer: Washington University in St. Louis
- Spouse(s): Fanny Stone (Balch) Woodward, m. 1863 (1837-1916)
- Children: 9 children, including Fanny (Kidy) Louise Woodward Mabley 1869-1956
- Awards: Originator of Manual Training Education and School

Calvin Milton Woodward (August 25, 1837 – January 12, 1914) was a United States educator and professor. As Dean of the school of engineering at Washington University in St. Louis, he developed a manual training program (a system of general, non-vocational tools training). He opened the St. Louis Manual Training School.

== Biography ==
Woodward was born at Fitchburg, Massachusetts, to Isaac Burnap Woodward and Eliza W. (Wetherbee) Woodward. He graduated from Harvard College with an A.B. in 1860.

His first position was as principal of Brown High School in Newburyport, Massachusetts. During the Civil War he enlisted and was promoted to captain of the 48th Massachusetts Infantry. From 1862 to 1863 he served in Louisiana, taking part in the siege and capture of Port Hudson under Nathaniel P. Banks. After completing his year of service, he returned to his role as principal of Brown High School. He married Fanny Stone Balch on September 30, 1863 in Newburyport, Massachusetts. They had nine children, five of whom died before reaching the age of ten.

At the close of the American Civil War, Woodward accepted a position as Vice Principal of Smith Academy in St. Louis, Missouri (part of Washington University). In 1868, he was appointed Assistant Professor of Mathematics at Washington University. Two years later, he was named the first Dean of the Engineering/Technical School, a position he held until 1896. Following later organizational changes, he assumed the role of Dean of the School of Engineering and Architecture in 1901.

As dean, Woodward began experimenting with manual skills education. Following an influential demonstration of the Della Vos, or Russian, method of tools instruction at the 1876 Centennial Exposition in Philadelphia, Woodward began making plans and gathering support for a similar initiative in the U.S. This culminated in the opening, in 1879, of the St. Louis Manual Training School as a subordinate department of Washington University. Without resigning his other duties, he filled the directorship of the school. The school was a pioneer of its kind in the United States, and served as the model in organizing other similar schools, in consequence of which Woodward's expositions of the aims and value of manual training have had much influence in shaping the new education both inside and outside the United States. During the 1880s, the Manual Training School was the largest and most well-attended public high school in St. Louis.

The manual training system that Woodward introduced was akin to tools training. Students learned how to use tools by shaping wood or metal, but the products they produced had no commercial value. The worth of the instruction lay mostly in mind-hand coordination.

Woodward lectured extensively on manual training and his high school. Yet by the late 1890s, manual training was under greater criticism because of its apparent disconnection to workplace skills. Critics (such as the National Association of Manufacturers) began advocating a system of vocational education that trained students for specific jobs instead of giving students general tools training.

He was a member of the school board of St. Louis 1878–1880, and president of the St. Louis Engineer Club in 1883/4. Woodward was president of the industrial department of the National Education Association 1882–1884, and vice president of the American Association for the Advancement of Science in 1888, presiding over the section on mechanical science. In 1885 he was invited to present a paper on "Manual Training" before the educational conference in Manchester, England, and afterward he visited the educational institutions of Europe.

Woodward was granted two honorary doctoral degrees in Laws in 1882 and 1905 from Washington University.

Calvin M. Woodward died in St. Louis on January 12, 1914.

== Works ==
- History of St. Louis Bridge (1881)
- The Manual Training School (1887)
- Manual Training in Education (1890)
- Rational and Applied Mechanics (1912)

He wrote a large number of papers on mathematical subjects and manual training, which he contributed to scientific journals and other periodicals.
