= Massachusetts House of Representatives' 3rd Worcester district =

American legislative district

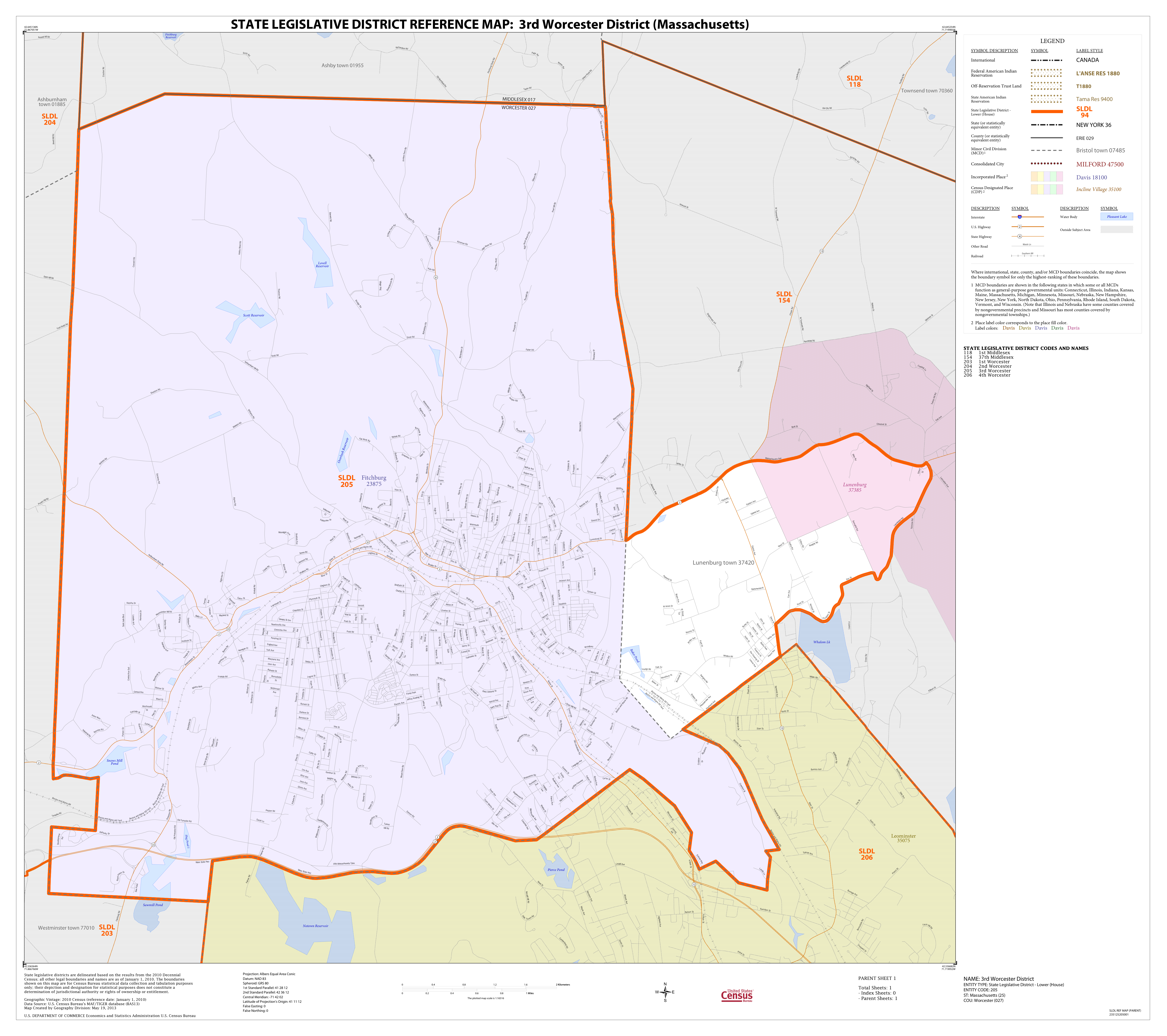
Map of Massachusetts House of Representatives' 3rd Worcester district, based on the 2010 United States census.

Massachusetts House of Representatives' 3rd Worcester district in the United States is one of 160 legislative districts included in the lower house of the Massachusetts General Court. It covers part of Worcester County. Democrat Stephan Hay of Fitchburg has represented the district since 2017. He planned to retire after 2020.

== Locales represented ==
The district includes the following localities:

- Fitchburg
- part of Lunenburg

The current district geographic boundary overlaps with that of the Massachusetts Senate's Worcester and Middlesex district.

=== Former locales ===
The district previously covered:

- Gardner, circa 1872
- Templeton, circa 1872

== Representatives ==
- John G. Mudge, circa 1858
- Russell Carruth, circa 1859
- Albert Llewellyn Wiley, circa 1888
- John Addison White, circa 1920
- George Walter Dean, circa 1951
- Edward Dennis Harrington Jr., circa 1975
- Emile Goguen
- Stephen DiNatale
- Stephan Hay, 2017-2020
- Michael P. Kushmerek, 2021-current

== See also ==
- List of Massachusetts House of Representatives elections
- Other Worcester County districts of the Massachusetts House of Representatives: 1st, 2nd, 4th, 5th, 6th, 7th, 8th, 9th, 10th, 11th, 12th, 13th, 14th, 15th, 16th, 17th, 18th
- Worcester County districts of the Massachusett Senate: 1st, 2nd; Hampshire, Franklin and Worcester; Middlesex and Worcester; Worcester, Hampden, Hampshire and Middlesex; Worcester and Middlesex; Worcester and Norfolk
- List of Massachusetts General Courts
- List of former districts of the Massachusetts House of Representatives

== Images ==
Portraits of legislators

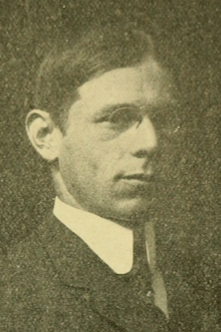
Waterman Williams

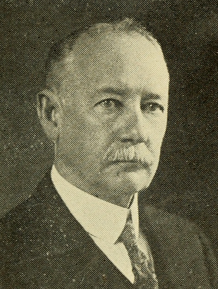
Myron Young

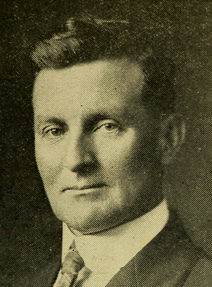
William Casey

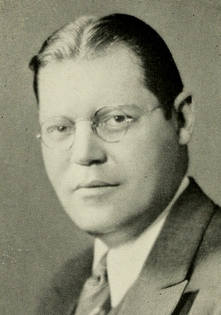
George Rice

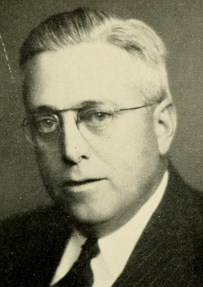
George Dean

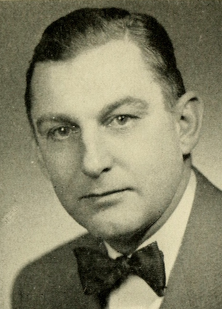
Paul Hinckley

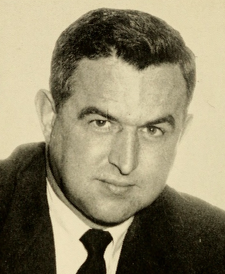
Edward Harrington

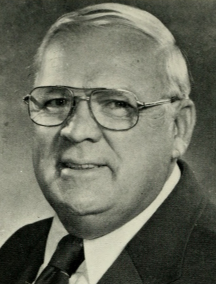
George Bourque

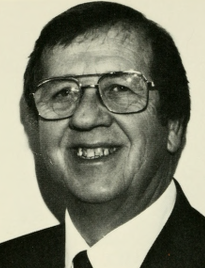
Emile Goguen
