= Liberté de Fitchburg =

US French language newspaper

Liberté de Fitchburg ('Liberty of Fitchburg') was a French language newspaper published in Fitchburg, Massachusetts. It began publishing in 1909, under the name L'Indépendant ("The Independent"). It changed its name to Le Progrès ("The Progress") and, in 1920, to "Liberté de Fitchburg". As of 1937, it was a weekly newspaper, with Léonard A. Remy as its director and Josaphat T. Benoît is its editor.
