= Peter J. Levanti =

American politician (1903–1988)

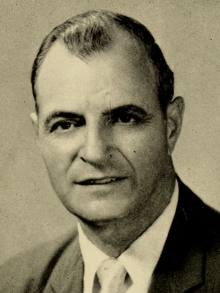
- Levanti as a member of the Massachusetts House of Representatives

Member of the Massachusetts House of Representatives from the 14th Worcester District
- In office 1965–1968
- Preceded by: Normand J. Babineau
- Succeeded by: George Bourque

Member of the Massachusetts House of Representatives from the 13th Worcester District
- In office 1957–1962
- Preceded by: Joseph D. Ward
- Succeeded by: Normand J. Babineau

Mayor of Fitchburg, Massachusetts
- In office 1950–1956
- Preceded by: George W. Stanton
- Succeeded by: Hedley Bray

Personal details
- Born: March 19, 1903 United States^{1}
- Died: October 27, 1988 (aged 85)
- Party: Democratic

Peter John Levanti (March 19, 1903 – October 27, 1988) was an American politician who was mayor of Fitchburg, Massachusetts from 1950 to 1956 and a member of the Massachusetts House of Representatives from 1957 to 1962 and 1965 to 1968.

== Early life ==
Levanti was born on March 19, 1903. He received a public school education in Fitchburg, but dropped out after grade school. On August 18, 1924, he married Rosanna Spadafora. They had five daughters. He founded Mohawk Express Transportation (later Mohawk-Mulcahy Express), a freight shipping company.

== Politics ==
Levanti was elected to the Fitchburg city council in 1939. He was the first Italian American to serve on the council. He served three terms as a ward councilor and two terms as a councilor at-large. He was council president in 1947. In 1949, he defeated incumbent mayor George W. Stanton in a close race. During his tenure, the Mare Meadow Reservoir and the John Fitch Highway were constructed. He was reelected in 1951 and 1953, but was defeated in 1955 by Hedley "Farmer" Bray 10,792 votes to 7,069.

Levanti represented the 13th Worcester district in the Massachusetts House of Representatives from 1957 to 1962. He was defeated for reelection in 1962 by Normand J. Babineau. He returned to the House in 1965 in what was now the 14th Worcester district. He retired from both business and politics in 1968.

== Notes ==
1. Sources give Levanti's place of birth as Westerly, Rhode Island, Pawtucket, Rhode Island, and Pawcatuck, Connecticut.
