= Lisa Wong =

American politician

Lisa A. Wong

Town Manager of South Hadley, Massachusetts
- Incumbent
- Assumed office 2021
- Preceded by: Mike Sullivan

Mayor of Fitchburg, Massachusetts
- In office 2007–2015
- Preceded by: Dan H. Mylott
- Succeeded by: Stephen DiNatale

Personal details
- Born: August 13, 1979 (age 46)
- Party: Democratic
- Spouse: Anthony Soto (m. 2014)
- Occupation: politician

Lisa A. Wong is an American politician who is the town manager of South Hadley, Massachusetts and the former mayor of Fitchburg, Massachusetts. She was the city's first Asian American mayor and the first Asian American female mayor in the state of Massachusetts.

== Early life ==
Wong is the daughter of Chinese immigrants who came to the United States in 1970. She grew up in North Andover. Her parents owned a Chinese restaurant named Hong Kong Kitchen in Haverhill, Mass., where Wong helped out as a child. Her parents encouraged her to receive an education so that she could take control of her own life. She was also active in sports; playing baseball (she was the only girl in her league), swimming and playing tennis.

== Career ==
Wong began working in Fitchburg at the Fitchburg Redevelopment Authority in 2001 and was the executive director by 2004.

In 2007, at age 28, Wong was first elected as mayor of Fitchburg, Massachusetts. When she took the position of mayor, the city "was on the edge of financial ruin." She was considered a "fresh young voice in an old mill city." During her first term in office, she had to make tough choices to help boost the cities financial situation. These included turning off half of the streetlamps across the city, cutting library hours and pushing to use the city's river as a "recreation magnet" and partnering with the university. She also reduced her salary when she took office and refused raises. By 2013, she had built up the city's reserves from $10,000 to $3 million, prompting Standard & Poor's to give the city's bond rating two upgrades. Wong won reelection three times before announcing in 2015 that she would not seek a fifth term as mayor.

As Soto seeks to become the first Hispanic mayor of Holyoke, Wong is not seeking a fifth term as mayor, and is instead moving to Holyoke.

In 2011, Wong served as one of six selection committee members for the Rudy Bruner Award for Urban Excellence.

On November 1, 2018, Wong became town manager of Winchester, Massachusetts.

On November 1, 2021, Wong was sworn in as the town administrator of South Hadley, Massachusetts.

== Personal ==
Wong met Anthony Soto at the Democratic National Convention in Charlotte, North Carolina. Wong is married to Anthony Soto, who is a city councilor in Holyoke. The ceremony took place in November 2014.
