= Sizer School =

Public school in Massachusetts

Coordinates: 42.6024°N 71.8021°W

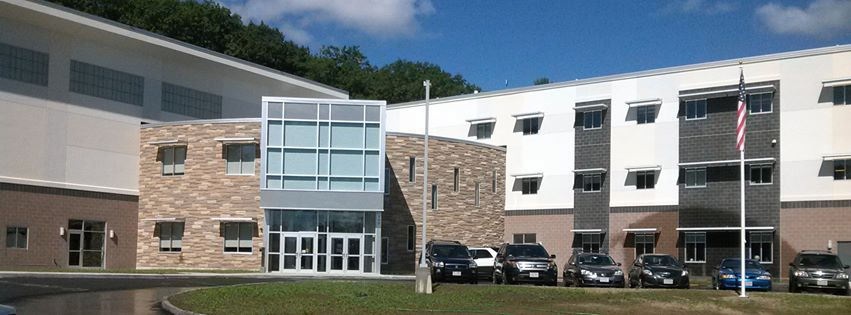
The Sizer School building

Sizer School is a public charter school in the City of Fitchburg Massachusetts.

The school was founded by Peter Garbus. It was thought up initially at a barbecue in 2000 by a group of educators looking to establish a charter school in the area. In 2001 the North Central Charter Essential School was chartered by the Commonwealth of Massachusetts. By 2002 it began operations with an inaugural class of 235 student from across the area.

In 2014 a building was donated to the school located on Rindge Road in Fitchburg. The same year the school was renamed Sizer School after Ted Sizer. It serves students from seventh through twelfth grades.
