= Paul Price (musician) =

American percussionist, educator, and composer

- Born: May 15, 1921; Fitchburg, Massachusetts
- Died: July 10, 1986 (aged 65); New York, New York
- Occupation(s): percussionist, composer, educator

Paul Price (May 15, 1921 – July 10, 1986) was an American percussionist, music educator, and composer who taught at Manhattan School of Music from 1957 until his death. An icon of contemporary music and percussion ensemble, in 1975, he was inducted into the Percussive Arts Society Hall of Fame, and in 1977, the National Association of American Composers USA awarded him for his "outstanding contribution to American music."

== Biography ==
A native of Fitchburg, Massachusetts, Price attended the New England Conservatory of Music where he was exposed to the avant-garde composers of the time, such as Edgard Varèse, and met Henry Cowell, who sparked his interest in percussion ensemble music. Price spent four years in the U.S. Army, after which he earned his bachelor's (1948) and masters (1949) in music from the Cincinnati Conservatory of Music. From 1949-1956, he taught at the University of Illinois Urbana-Champaign where his archives are housed. During these years, he championed the percussion works of Cowell, Varese, Lou Harrison, John Cage, George Antheil, and many others. While stimulating a growing environment in the performance of works for percussion, he created the publishing firm, "Music for Percussion," and later the "Paul Price Publications." Over 400 compositions were premiered under his direction throughout his forty-year career.
