= Stephen DiNatale =

American politician

Mayor of Fitchburg, Massachusetts
- In office 2016–2023
- Preceded by: Lisa Wong
- Succeeded by: Samantha Squailia

Member of the Massachusetts House of Representatives from the 3rd Worcester District
- In office 2007–2016
- Preceded by: Emile J. Goguen
- Succeeded by: Stephan Hay

Personal details
- Party: Democratic Party
- Spouse: Joanne
- Children: 2
- Education: Fitchburg State College

Stephen Louis DiNatale is an American politician who previously served as the 45th Mayor of Fitchburg, Massachusetts.

== Career ==
Raised in Leominster and of Italian descent, DiNatale graduated from St. Bernard's High School in Fitchburg in 1970. After high school, he joined the United States Navy as an operations specialist petty officer 3rd class until 1974. In 1979, he received his Bachelor of Science in Sociology from Fitchburg State College.

In 2000, DiNatale joined the Fitchburg Public Schools School Committee until 2003. From 2004 to 2006, he became a city councilor.

DiNatale served in the Massachusetts House of Representatives for the 3rd Worcester District from 2007 to 2016, succeeding Emile J. Goguen.

On November 3, 2015, DiNatale won the election for Mayor of Fitchburg with a large percentage of the vote, and assumed office in January 2016.

== Personal life ==
A resident of Fitchburg, DiNatale is married to Joanne, with whom he has two children: Marcus and Alexandra.
