= Teuvo Peltoniemi =

Finnish writer and journalist

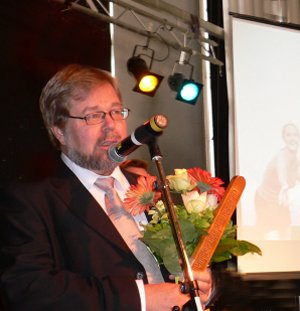
Teuvo Peltoniemi receives the rune-staff belonging to the "Press Officer of the Year 2006 Award".

Teuvo Peltoniemi (born 1950) is a Finnish writer, journalist, researcher, educator, and eHealth developer specialized on addictions. Since the 1970s he has been contributing by research and journalism to increase public awareness in Finland for many taboo societal problems, like general speed limits, family violence, sexual abuse of children, situation of children of alcohol abusing parents, and net addiction. After retirement he now writes about social issues in his blog at Iltalehti evening paper, and in science journals and books as well as maintains two sites on the Finnish Utopian Communities.

== Early life and education ==
Peltoniemi was born in Finnish Lapland. He has higher academic degrees in sociology and mass communication from Universities of Tampere and Helsinki. His M.A. dissertation is about the change of drinking habits of students in Kemi and his Licentiate dissertation about the Helsinki Alcohol Treatment Agency ("PAVI").

As journalist he has been producing for the Finnish Broadcasting Company news as well as radio and TV documentaries about social, scientific and emigration history topics. He has worked also at the University of Tampere and at various academic and government research institutes. In 1979 he had a research scholarship at the Addiction Research Foundation in Toronto, Ontario.

== Past activities ==
Until retirement (2010) Peltoniemi was the communications director of the A-Clinic Foundation, a Finnish addiction treatment organisation, as well as editor-in-chief of the Finnish journal on addictions, Tiimi, and of a Finnish web and mobile portal on addictions, AddictionLink. He was also developing Finnish and European prevention projects, like in Finland the still continuing Lasinen lapsuus ("Fragile Childhood") activities that started already in 1986.

He is the founder and honorary president of the EU network Prevnet on addictions-related eHealth, and a founding member and past president of Encare Network for children affected by risky environments within the family. He was also expert for many COE Pompidou group prevention projects of the Pompidou Group of the Council of Europe e.g. Exass.

== Awards ==
Teuvo Peltoniemi has received a number of national and European awards related to his work, like (personal awards:) in 2011 the State of Finland Life Achievement Award for "exemplary and unconventional public information work" referring to his role of early pioneer on many taboo social problems; the "2007 Science Journalist Award" by the Finnish Association of Science Editors and Journalists; and the "2006 Press Officer of the Year" award by ProCom – Finnish Association of Communications Professionals.

In 1998, Lasinen lapsuus ("Fragile Childhood") received an Honorary Award of the First European Health Education Award and its Varjomaailma ("Shadow World) site was the winner at the "2008 European e-Inclusion Awards at the Marginalised young people category". Päihdelinkki ("AddictionLink") was EU eHealth2004 Awards finalist in Cork 2004, and received the “Special Award” of the Prime Minister's Awards for Best Finnish Information Society Practices in 2006.

== Works ==
In addition to hundreds of articles and conference papers Peltoniemi has written, edited or translated 18 books. He has also published about 100 foreign health educational videos in Finnish translations. All his publications and books are listed at his home site. Here are the main books by topics:

Alcohol, drugs, net addiction

- (ed.) Pääasiana alkoholi – käyttö, haitat, hoito, politiikka nyt ja 2040 (Alcohol as the main thing – use, harms, treatment, policy now and in 2040), Lundbeck. Helsinki 2013. ISBN 978-952-93-1517-8.
- Terassilta tiputukseen – Puheenvuoroja päihteistä (From a terrace pub to hospital drip – writings about addictions), A-Clinic Foundation. Helsinki 2009. ISBN 978-952-5587-55-5.
- (co-ed. with Tuukka Tammi) Telematic drug & alcohol prevention. A-Clinic Foundation & European Community. Helsinki 1999. ISBN 952-9894-49-X.
- (with Timo Larmela) Kahta mieltä kannabiksesta – debatti (Two opinions about cannabis – the debate on legalizing of cannabis). A-Clinic Foundation. Helsinki 1998. ISBN 952-9894-26-0.
- (ed.) Moni ottaa ja ajaa – rattijuoppous Suomessa (Many drink and drive – drinking and driving in Finland). VAPK Publishing. Helsinki 1991. ISBN 951-37-0358-4.
- (co-ed. with Martti Voipio) Alkoholi ja yhteiskunta (Alcohol and the society). Otava. Helsinki 1983. ISBN 951-1-07537-3.

Family violence and sexual abuse of children

- Perheväkivalta (Family Violence). Otava. Helsinki 1984. ISBN 951-1-07787-2.
- Yhteinen salaisuus – seksuaalisesti hyväksikäytetyt lapset kertovat (The common secret – told by sexually abused children). Otava. Helsinki 1988. ISBN 951-1-10401-2.

Utopian emigration

- Kohti parempaa maailmaa – suomalaiset ihanneyhteisöt 1700-luvulta nykypäivään (Towards a better world: Finnish Utopian Settlements from the 1700s till today). Otava. Helsinki 1985. ISBN 951-1-08551-4. Also as audio book, video, photo exhibition.

Mr. Peltoniemi still appears frequently in media as expert for addiction and prevention issues, mostly in Finland, but occasionally also abroad.
