= Lempi Ikävalko =

Finnish writer, poet and actress

Lempi Ikävalko (9 May 1901 in Ruskeala, Finland – 1994 in Helsinki) was a Finnish writer, poet, actress and performance artist. She spent much of her adult life as a journalist in the United States but she strongly identified with her roots in Karelia—in Finnish, Karjala, the region considered the cradle of Finnish mythology because the Kalevala, the national epic poem, came from there. (Note: since World War II Karelia has been divided between Finland and Russia.)

In the 1940s two books of Lempi Ikävalko's poetry were published in Finland, and she gave recitals at the Finnish National Theatre and other venues - a long way to come for a peasant girl from the most modest of circumstances in an obscure country village. Aside from the reputation of her two books, the first of which was written in a time of great hardship (World War II), and both of which were well received, she also established a herself as an expert in the 22,000-line narrative of the Kalevala, which she recited at Finnish community festivals in the U.S. and elsewhere. Lempi was reputed to know the epic poem by heart—whether this was true or not is not known, but to all evidence, based on unfaltering recitations of long sections, it seemed to be the case.

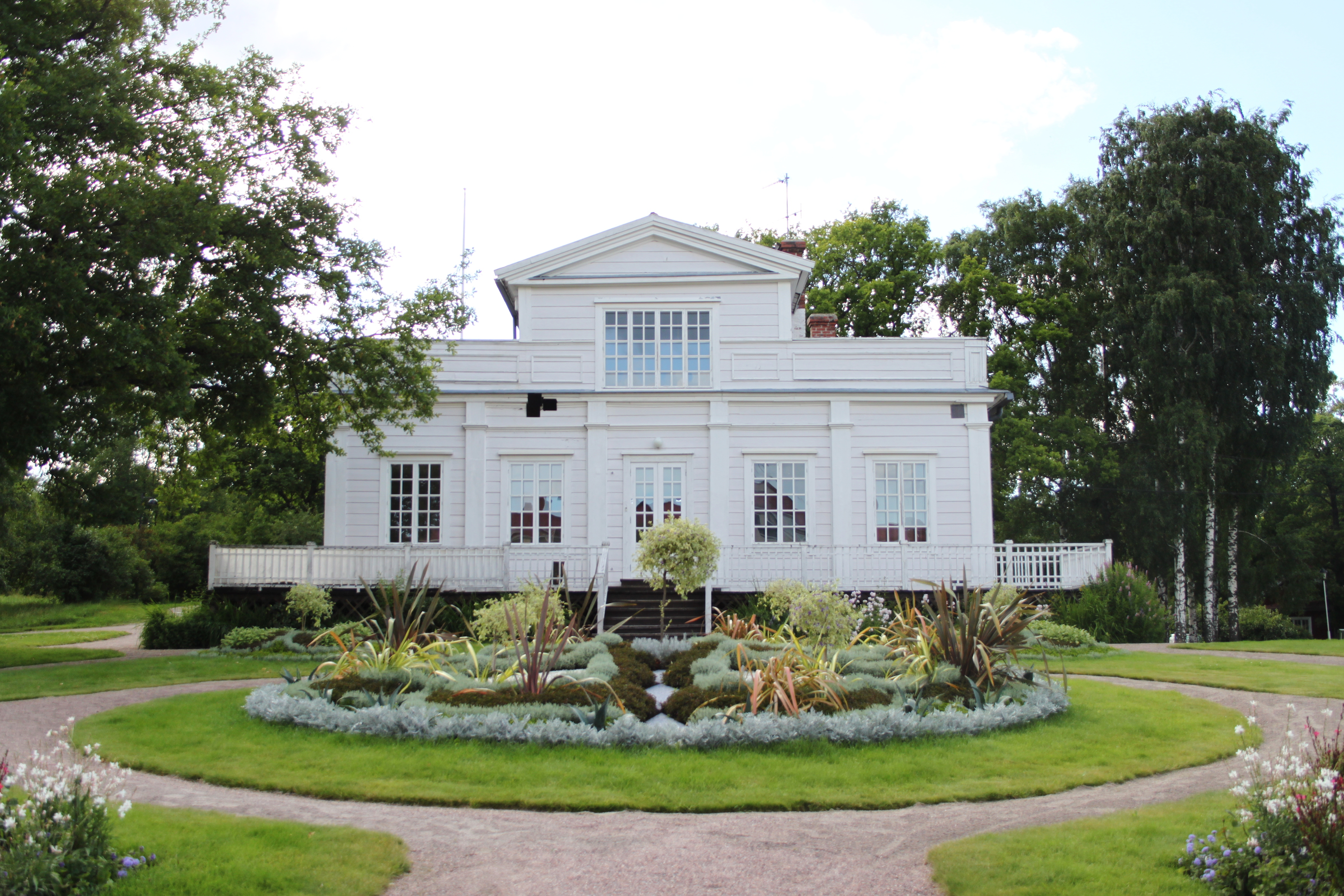
Annala (Villa Anneberg, Helsinki): Lempi Ikävalko's Finland residence, 1950s

In 1950 Lempi Ikävalko and much of her family moved into the Villa Anneberg ("Annalan kartano" or "Annala"), a historical (completed in 1832) manor house with formal gardens on a hill on the outskirts of Helsinki, in the Arabianranta area of old Helsinki, part of "Vanhakaupunki", the neighborhood where the city was founded in 1550. Artists, writers and other creative personalities gathered at the hilltop villa, plays were staged in the ballroom, holiday celebrations involved the wider community, and the house also served as a gallery for Lempi Ikävalko's son, Johannes Ikävalko, an art dealer. It was a time of creative exploration and Lempi tried everything that fortune permitted. For a time, when she was already 50 years of age, Lempi performed with a traveling troupe in Finland and Sweden as a dancer partnered by a large boa constrictor (which lived with the rest of the family at Villa Anneberg).

In the mid-1950s Lempi Ikävalko started visiting the United States where she eventually spent more than three decades as a journalist, writer and frequently-consulted expert on Finnish emigration communities. She worked as an editor and writer at daily Finnish-language newspapers serving the Finnish immigrant communities in America. She wrote for Finnish journals in Lake Worth, Florida (at Amerikan Uutiset) and in Duluth, Minnesota (at Industrialisti); but the longest of these engagements was at the Finnish daily Raivaaja (The Pioneer) in Fitchburg, Massachusetts—a city of 40,000 residents with a large proportion of Finns.

Considered an important voice on Finnish emigration (often motivated by what has been characterized as the Nordic dream of tropical utopias), especially regarding South America as a destination, Lempi Ikävalko regularly visited Finnish settlements in Brazil, Paraguay and other Latin American countries. She was interviewed for Towards a Better World: Finnish Utopian Settlements from the 1700s till today (Otava, Helsinki 1985. ISBN 951-1-08551-4) by Teuvo Peltoniemi. It is a book examining the history and the prospects of the Finnish search for a better life, and Lempi herself authored many newspaper articles on related topics. Her work with the Finnish community in Penedo, Brazil, was particularly noted. A colorful personality and an inspiring speaker, she is remembered for the unique combination of clear-headed analytical intellect and a passion for exploring new places and ways of life. Curious and fearless to the last, she travelled alone in remote regions of S. America into her eighties. She spent the last 10 years of her life living in Helsinki. In 1994, aged 93, she died in a rest home in the Helsinki neighborhood of Käpylä - surrounded by drafts of poems, reminiscences and scattered pages of her as yet unpublished autobiography. The Finnish government-funded Siirtolaisinstituutti (Institute of Migration) in the port city of Turku, Finland keeps an archive of some of Lempi Ikävalko's letters, articles, photos and memorabilia.
