= Fitchburg, Massachusetts =

- City
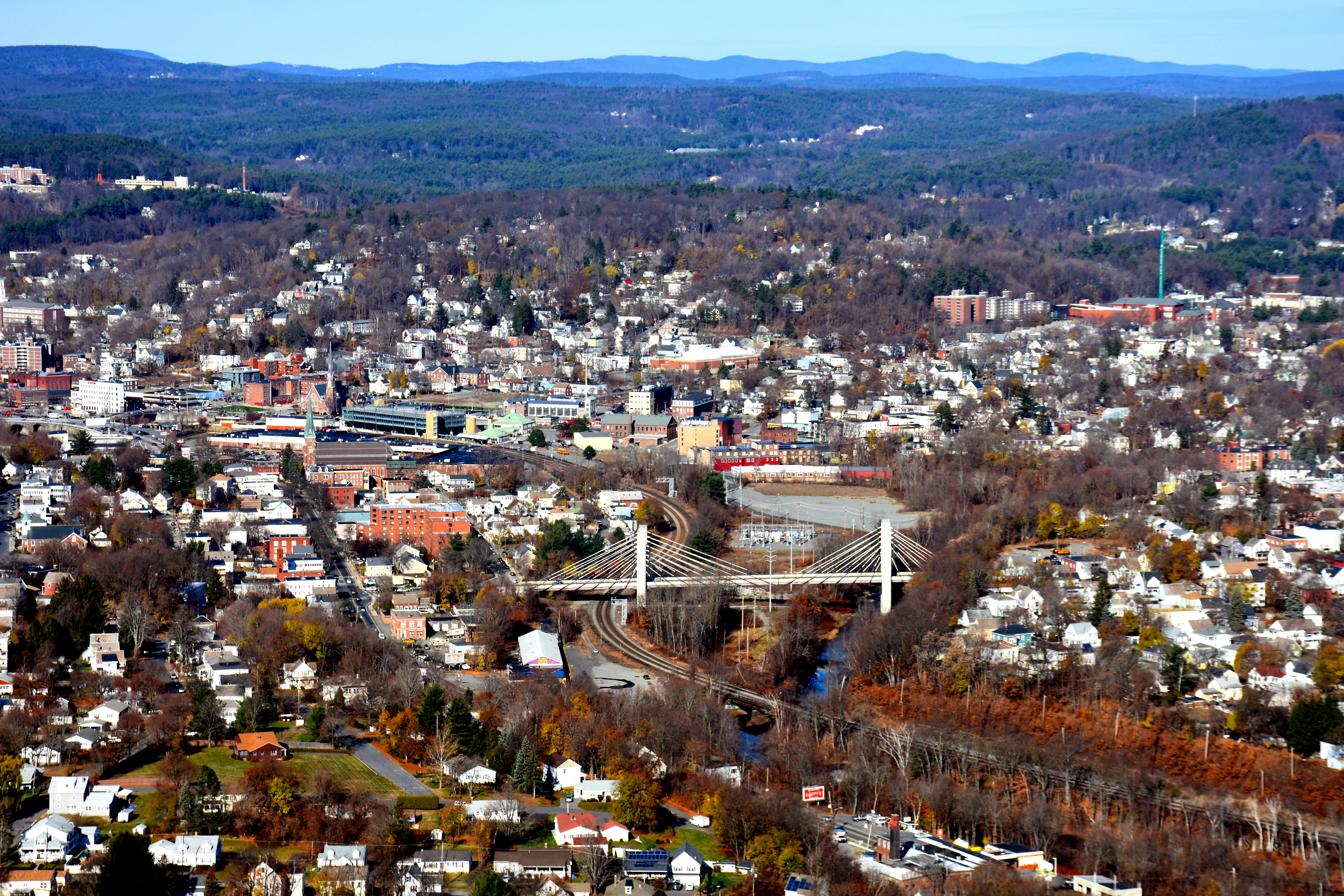
- Downtown Fitchburg seen from the south

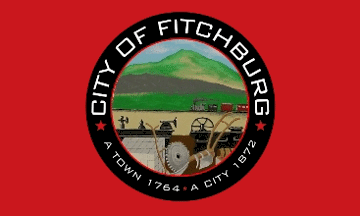
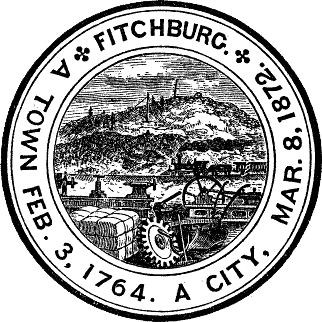
- Flag Seal
- Nicknames: City by the River, The Burg
- Location in Worcester County and the state of Massachusetts

- Location in the United States
- Coordinates: 42°35′00″N 71°48′10″W
- Country: United States
- State: Massachusetts
- County: Worcester
- Settled: 1730
- Incorporated (town): 1764
- Incorporated (city): 1872

Government
  - Type: Mayor–council
  - City Council: City Council members: at large: Sally Cragin; at large: Marcus DiNatale; at large: Amy Green; at large: Samantha Squailia; at large: Anthony Zarrella (President); Ward 1: Bernard Schultz III; Ward 2: Paul Beauchemin; Ward 3: Andrew Couture; Ward 4: Andrew Van Hazinga (Vice-President); Ward 5: Marisa Fleming; Ward 6: Derrick Cruz

Area
  - Total: 28.12 sq mi (72.82 km^{2})
  - Land: 27.82 sq mi (72.06 km^{2})
  - Water: 0.29 sq mi (0.76 km^{2})
- Elevation: 469 ft (143 m)

Population (2020)
  - Total: 41,946
  - Density: 1,507.6/sq mi (582.07/km^{2})
- Time zone: UTC−5 (Eastern)
  - Summer (DST): UTC−4 (Eastern)
- ZIP Code: 01420
- Area code: 351/978
- FIPS code: 25-23875
- GNIS feature ID: 0617121
- Website: fitchburgma.gov

Fitchburg is a city in northern Worcester County, Massachusetts, United States. The third-largest city in the county, its population was 41,946 at the 2020 census. Fitchburg State University is located here.

== History ==
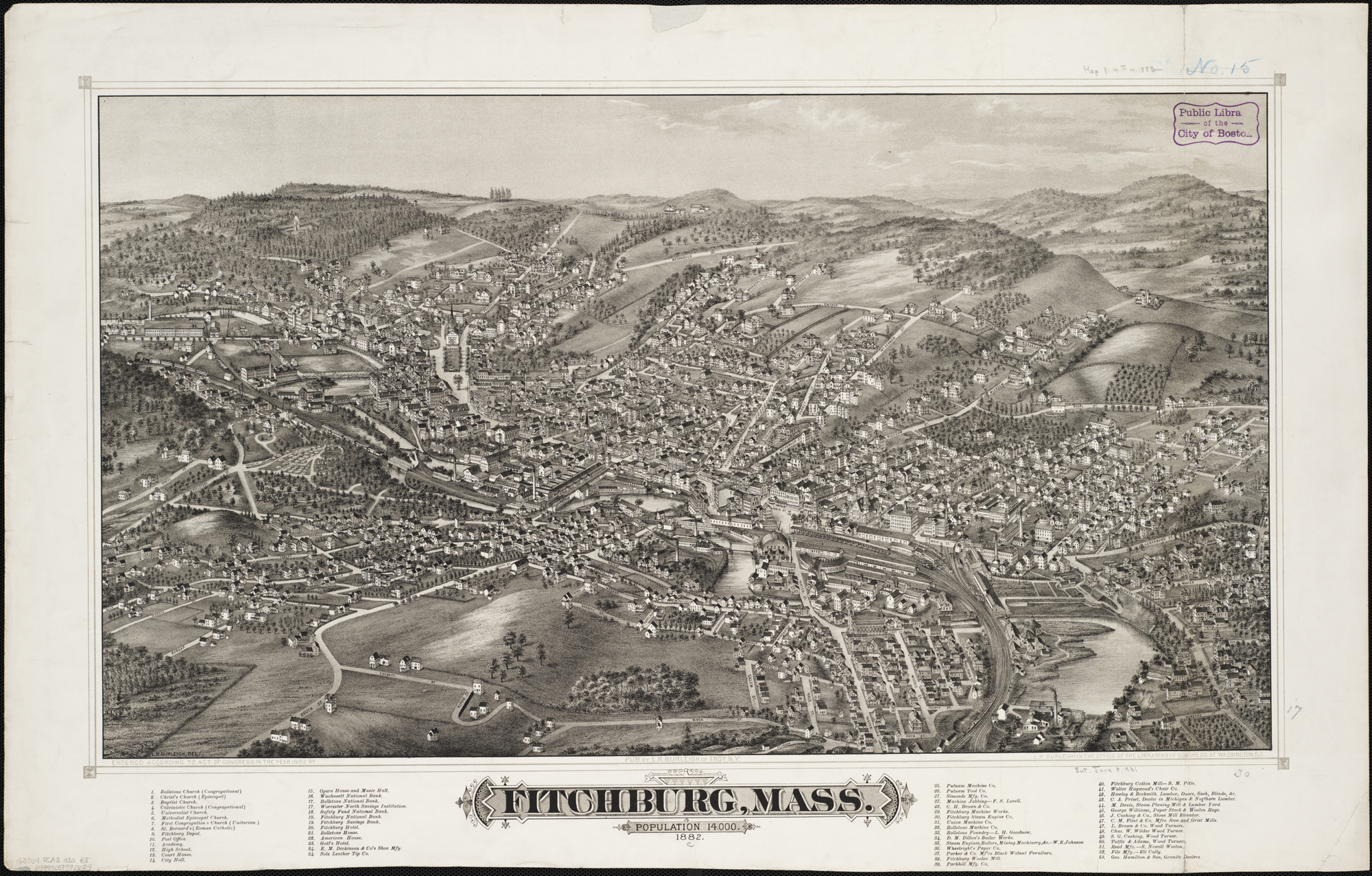
Print of Fitchburg from 1882 by L.R. Burleigh with listing of landmarks

Fitchburg was first settled in by Europeans in 1730 as part of Lunenburg, and was officially set apart from that town and incorporated in 1764. The area was previously occupied by the Nipmuc tribe. It is named for John Fitch, one of the committee that procured the act of incorporation. In July 1748 Fitch and his family, living in this isolated spot, were abducted to Canada by Native Americans, but returned the next year.

Fitchburg is situated on both the Nashua River and a railroad line. The original Fitchburg Railroad ran through the Hoosac Tunnel, linking Boston and Albany, New York. The tunnel was built using the Burleigh Rock Drill, designed and built in Fitchburg. Fitchburg was a 19th-century industrial center. Originally operated by water power, large mills produced machines, tools, clothing, paper, and firearms. The city is noted for its architecture, particularly in the Victorian style, built at the height of its mill town prosperity. A few examples of these 19th century buildings are the Fay Club, the old North Worcester County Courthouse and the Bullock house.

In 1922, it was affected by the 1922 New England Textile Strike, shutting down the mills in the city over an attempted wage cut.

As the city is one of Worcester County's two shire towns, it has hosted the Northern Worcester County Registry of Deeds, established in 1903, and the county jail on Water Street.

In 1961, two films Return to Peyton Place and By Love Possessed filmed exterior street scenes, town squares and public buildings in Fitchburg.

== Geography ==
According to the United States Census Bureau, the city has a total area of 28.1 square miles (73 km^{2}), of which 27.8 square miles (72 km^{2}) is land and 0.3 square miles (0.78 km^{2}), or 1.07%, is water. The city is drained by the Nashua River. The highest point in Fitchburg is the summit of Brown Hill near the northwestern corner of the city, at 1,210 feet (370 m) above sea level.

Fitchburg is bordered by Ashby to the north, Lunenburg to the east, Leominster to the south, Westminster to the west, and a small portion of Ashburnham to the northwest.

=== Neighborhoods ===
Fitchburg is divided into multiple different neighborhoods/villages, including:

- Cleghorn
- Crockerville
- College Area
- Downtown Fitchburg
- East Side
- Green Acres Village
- North Fitchburg
- The Patch
- Prichard-Pleasant Street
- South Fitchburg
- Tar Hill
- Upper Common
- Waite's Corner
- West Fitchburg

=== Climate ===
Fitchburg's climate is humid continental, which is the predominant climate for Massachusetts and New England. Summers are typically warm, rainy, and humid, while winters are cold, windy, and snowy. Spring and fall are usually mild, but conditions vary widely and depend on wind direction and jet stream positioning. The warmest month is July, with an average high temperature of about 84 °F and an average low temperature of about 63 °F. The coldest month is January, with an average high temperature of about 35 °F and an average low temperature of about 17 °F.

Climate data for Fitchburg Municipal Airport, Fitchburg, Massachusetts (1998–2020 normals); Snow: Fitchburg COOP (2016–2023)
| Month | Jan | Feb | Mar | Apr | May | Jun | Jul | Aug | Sep | Oct | Nov | Dec | Year |
|---|---|---|---|---|---|---|---|---|---|---|---|---|---|
| Record high °F (°C) | 70 (21) | 80 (27) | 89 (32) | 94 (34) | 98 (37) | 100 (38) | 103 (39) | 100 (38) | 96 (36) | 87 (31) | 80 (27) | 74 (23) | 103 (39) |
| Mean maximum °F (°C) | 57 (14) | 57 (14) | 68 (20) | 82 (28) | 90 (32) | 92 (33) | 94 (34) | 93 (34) | 89 (32) | 79 (26) | 70 (21) | 61 (16) | 96 (36) |
| Mean daily maximum °F (°C) | 34.8 (1.6) | 38.0 (3.3) | 46.3 (7.9) | 59.2 (15.1) | 70.0 (21.1) | 78.1 (25.6) | 83.9 (28.8) | 82.3 (27.9) | 75.4 (24.1) | 62.2 (16.8) | 50.9 (10.5) | 40.2 (4.6) | 59.5 (15.3) |
| Daily mean °F (°C) | 25.8 (−3.4) | 28.3 (−2.1) | 36.4 (2.4) | 48.0 (8.9) | 58.8 (14.9) | 67.5 (19.7) | 73.3 (22.9) | 71.6 (22.0) | 64.2 (17.9) | 51.5 (10.8) | 41.2 (5.1) | 31.5 (−0.3) | 49.3 (9.6) |
| Mean daily minimum °F (°C) | 16.9 (−8.4) | 18.6 (−7.4) | 26.5 (−3.1) | 36.8 (2.7) | 47.5 (8.6) | 56.9 (13.8) | 62.7 (17.1) | 60.9 (16.1) | 53.1 (11.7) | 40.8 (4.9) | 31.4 (−0.3) | 22.7 (−5.2) | 39.1 (3.9) |
| Mean minimum °F (°C) | −2 (−19) | 2 (−17) | 8 (−13) | 25 (−4) | 34 (1) | 44 (7) | 53 (12) | 50 (10) | 38 (3) | 26 (−3) | 17 (−8) | 4 (−16) | −4 (−20) |
| Record low °F (°C) | −13 (−25) | −15 (−26) | −12 (−24) | 15 (−9) | 29 (−2) | 36 (2) | 47 (8) | 45 (7) | 28 (−2) | 15 (−9) | 7 (−14) | −7 (−22) | −15 (−26) |
| Average precipitation inches (mm) | 2.62 (67) | 3.01 (76) | 3.94 (100) | 3.79 (96) | 3.74 (95) | 4.59 (117) | 3.47 (88) | 3.49 (89) | 3.97 (101) | 4.46 (113) | 3.27 (83) | 3.41 (87) | 44.45 (1,129) |
| Average snowfall inches (cm) | 15.1 (38) | 17.8 (45) | 18.6 (47) | 2.9 (7.4) | 0 (0) | 0 (0) | 0 (0) | 0 (0) | 0 (0) | 0.8 (2.0) | 3.1 (7.9) | 17.5 (44) | 70.7 (180) |
Source: https://www.weather.gov/wrh/climate?wfo=box

== Demographics ==
Historical population
| Year | Pop. | ±% |
|---|---|---|
| 1790 | 1,151 | — |
| 1800 | 1,390 | +20.8% |
| 1810 | 1,566 | +12.7% |
| 1820 | 1,736 | +10.9% |
| 1830 | 2,169 | +24.9% |
| 1840 | 2,604 | +20.1% |
| 1850 | 5,120 | +96.6% |
| 1860 | 7,805 | +52.4% |
| 1870 | 11,260 | +44.3% |
| 1880 | 12,429 | +10.4% |
| 1890 | 22,037 | +77.3% |
| 1900 | 31,531 | +43.1% |
| 1910 | 37,826 | +20.0% |
| 1920 | 41,029 | +8.5% |
| 1930 | 40,692 | −0.8% |
| 1940 | 41,824 | +2.8% |
| 1950 | 42,691 | +2.1% |
| 1960 | 43,021 | +0.8% |
| 1970 | 43,343 | +0.7% |
| 1980 | 39,580 | −8.7% |
| 1990 | 41,194 | +4.1% |
| 2000 | 39,102 | −5.1% |
| 2010 | 40,318 | +3.1% |
| 2020 | 41,946 | +4.0% |
| 2024 | 42,145 | +0.5% |
Source: United States census records and Population Estimates Program data. Source: U.S. Decennial Census

=== 2020 census ===
As of the 2020 census, Fitchburg had a population of 41,946. The median age was 36.1 years. 22.1% of residents were under the age of 18 and 14.6% of residents were 65 years of age or older. For every 100 females there were 94.9 males, and for every 100 females age 18 and over there were 92.8 males age 18 and over.

92.4% of residents lived in urban areas, while 7.6% lived in rural areas.

There were 16,143 households in Fitchburg, of which 29.8% had children under the age of 18 living in them. Of all households, 36.2% were married-couple households, 22.2% were households with a male householder and no spouse or partner present, and 31.6% were households with a female householder and no spouse or partner present. About 31.0% of all households were made up of individuals and 12.0% had someone living alone who was 65 years of age or older.

There were 17,452 housing units, of which 7.5% were vacant. The homeowner vacancy rate was 1.4% and the rental vacancy rate was 5.3%.

Racial composition as of the 2020 census
| Race | Number | Percent |
|---|---|---|
| White | 25,311 | 60.3% |
| Black or African American | 3,032 | 7.2% |
| American Indian and Alaska Native | 256 | 0.6% |
| Asian | 1,531 | 3.6% |
| Native Hawaiian and Other Pacific Islander | 16 | 0.0% |
| Some other race | 5,866 | 14.0% |
| Two or more races | 5,934 | 14.1% |
| Hispanic or Latino (of any race) | 12,608 | 30.1% |

=== 2010 census ===
As of the census of 2010, there were 40,318 people, 15,165 households, and 9,362 families residing in the city. The population density was 1,450.3 inhabitants per square mile (560.0/km^{2}). There were 17,117 housing units at an average density of 615.7 per square mile (237.7/km^{2}). The racial makeup of the city was 78.2% White, 5.1% African American, 0.3% Native American, 3.6% Asian, 0.0% Pacific Islander, 9.1% from other races, and 3.7% from two or more races. Hispanic or Latino of any race were 21.6% of the population (14.6% Puerto Rican, 1.8% Dominican, 1.6% Uruguayan, 1.4% Mexican, 0.3% Ecuadorian, 0.2% Colombian, 0.2% Honduran, 0.1% Guatemalan, 0.1% Salvadoran, 0.1% Spanish, 0.1% Peruvian). 76.9% spoke English, 15.1% Spanish, 4.2% Other Indo-European Language and 2.6% Asian and Pacific Islander Languages as their first language.

There were 15,165 households, out of which 29.0% had children under the age of 18 living with them, 39.3% were married couples living together, 6.1% had a male householder with no wife present, 16.2% had a female householder with no husband present, and 38.3% were non-families. 29.8% of all households were made up of individuals. The average household size was 2.49 and the average family size was 3.10.

In the city, the population was spread out, with 22.9% under the age of 18, 14.1% from 18 to 24, 25.9% from 25 to 44, 24.7% from 45 to 64, and 12.4% who were 65 years of age or older. The median age was 34.7 years. For every 100 females, there were 94.5 males. For every 100 females age 18 and over, there were 92.3 males.

The median income for a household in the city was $47,019, and the median income for a family was $57,245. Males had a median income of $47,350 versus $37,921 for females. The per capita income for the city was $22,972. About 14.6% of families and 19.4% of the population were below the poverty line, including 27.3% of those under age 18 and 12.7% of those age 65 or over.

== Economy ==
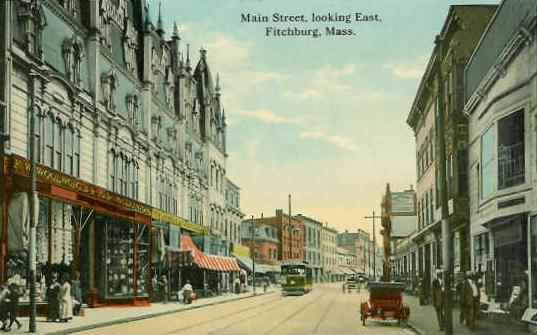
Main Street, looking east, in c. 1912

Throughout the early twentieth century, Fitchburg was known for its paper industry, which occupied the banks of the Nashua River and employed a large segment of the European immigrant population. It has been noted by many residents in Fitchburg that the Nashua River would be dyed the color the paper mills had been coloring the paper that day.

- Founded in 1939, the Wachusett Potato Chip Company purchased the former County Jail buildings and grounds in the 1940s and has operated as a manufacturing and distributing facility for snack products since that time. It was purchased by UTZ in 2011 and still makes chips for local distribution using the Wachusett name.
- Two truck manufacturing firms, the Wachusett Truck Company and the New England Truck Company, operated in Fitchburg during the early twentieth century.
- Simonds International, Saw manufacturer founded in Fitchburg in 1832 and still operating on Intervale Road.
- The Iver Johnson Arms and Cycle Works made motorcycles for a short time, in addition to their primary products, firearms and bicycles.
- Assumption Life, a large financial services company, was founded in Fitchburg in 1903 before moving to Moncton, New Brunswick.
- When completed in June 2014 Great Wolf Lodge New England will have spent over 70 million dollars in renovations to former Holiday Inn/Coco Key Water Resort. There will be over 400 new permanent jobs created from this project.

=== Fitchburg Central Steam Plant ===
The Fitchburg Central Steam Plant (locally known by its nickname: the PLT) was built in 1928 to provide steam and electricity to the many local paper mills. As the paper mills were abandoned or improved the Central Steam Plant fell into disuse and was abandoned. In 2008, the EPA designated the Central Steam Plant a brownfield site due to contamination of the site soil and groundwater with metals and inorganic contaminants. The EPA provided the City of Fitchburg $50,500 in grant money to help clean up hazardous substances on the site.

Cleanup of the Central Steam Plant started in 2010 and is ongoing as of July 2011. As of December 2015, the Fitchburg Central Steam Plant has been razed. The last structure to fall was its massive smokestack.

== Arts and culture ==
The Fitchburg Art Museum was founded in 1925 and includes over 20,000 square feet (1,900 m^{2}) of gallery and educational space which features a "cross barn" built in 1883, the Simond's building completed in 1989, and 12 galleries feature American, African, Egyptian, Greek, and Roman art.

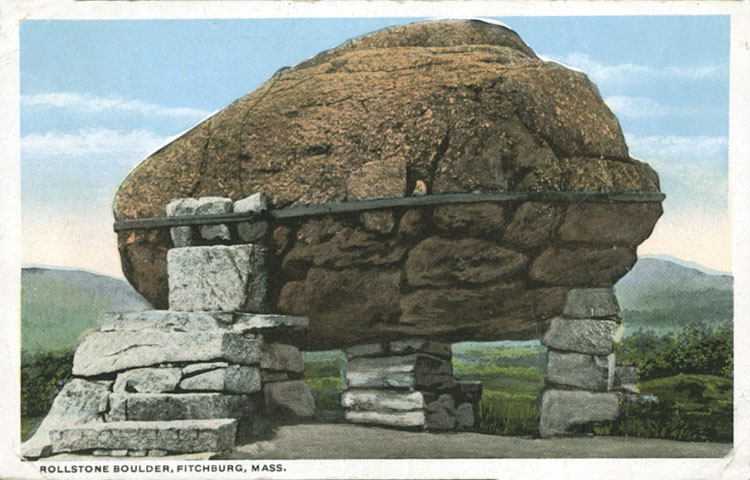
The Rollstone Boulder, on the summit of Rollstone Hill in 1909

The Rollstone Boulder is a 110-ton specimen of porphyritic granite located in a small triangular public park. The boulder was a feature of the summit of Rollstone Hill; it was exploded and reassembled on the green in 1929 and 1930.

The Fitchburg Historical Society houses more than 200,000 items related to the history of Fitchburg, including Sentinel newspapers from 1838 to 1976, city directories, photographs, scrapbooks, manuscripts, family genealogies, postcards, files on industries in the city, books and pamphlets on Fitchburg's history from the 1700s to the present, a Civil War collection, and a collection on the railroad.

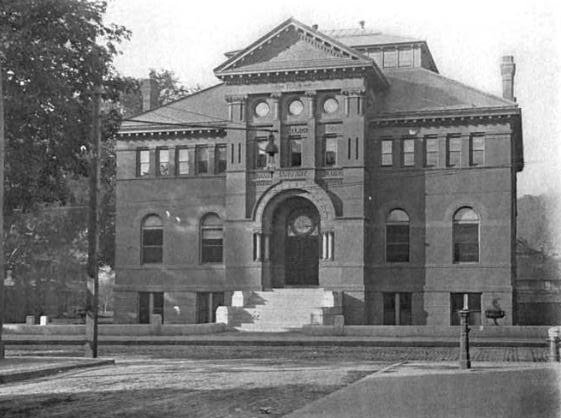
Public library, Fitchburg, c. 1907

The Fitchburg Public Library was established in 1859. In 1899, a child-specific library service began in one of the country's first children's rooms. Fitchburg Public Library became the first regional library in the Massachusetts Regional Library System in 1962. In 2008, the library had a budget of $1,111,412. In 2014, the Fitchburg Law Library opened.

Other cultural features include:

- Arthur J. DiTommaso Memorial Bridge
- Fitchburg Longsjo Classic (no longer active)
- The Finnish Center at Saima Park
- Wallace Civic Center of Fitchburg State University

== Parks and recreation ==
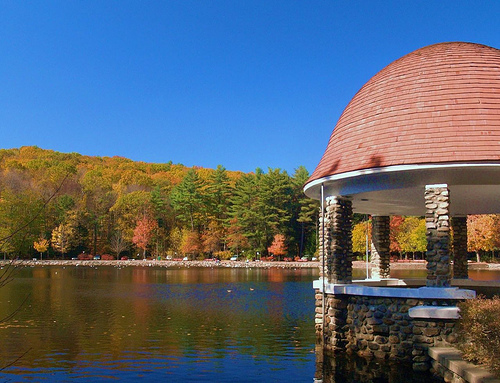
Coggshall Park

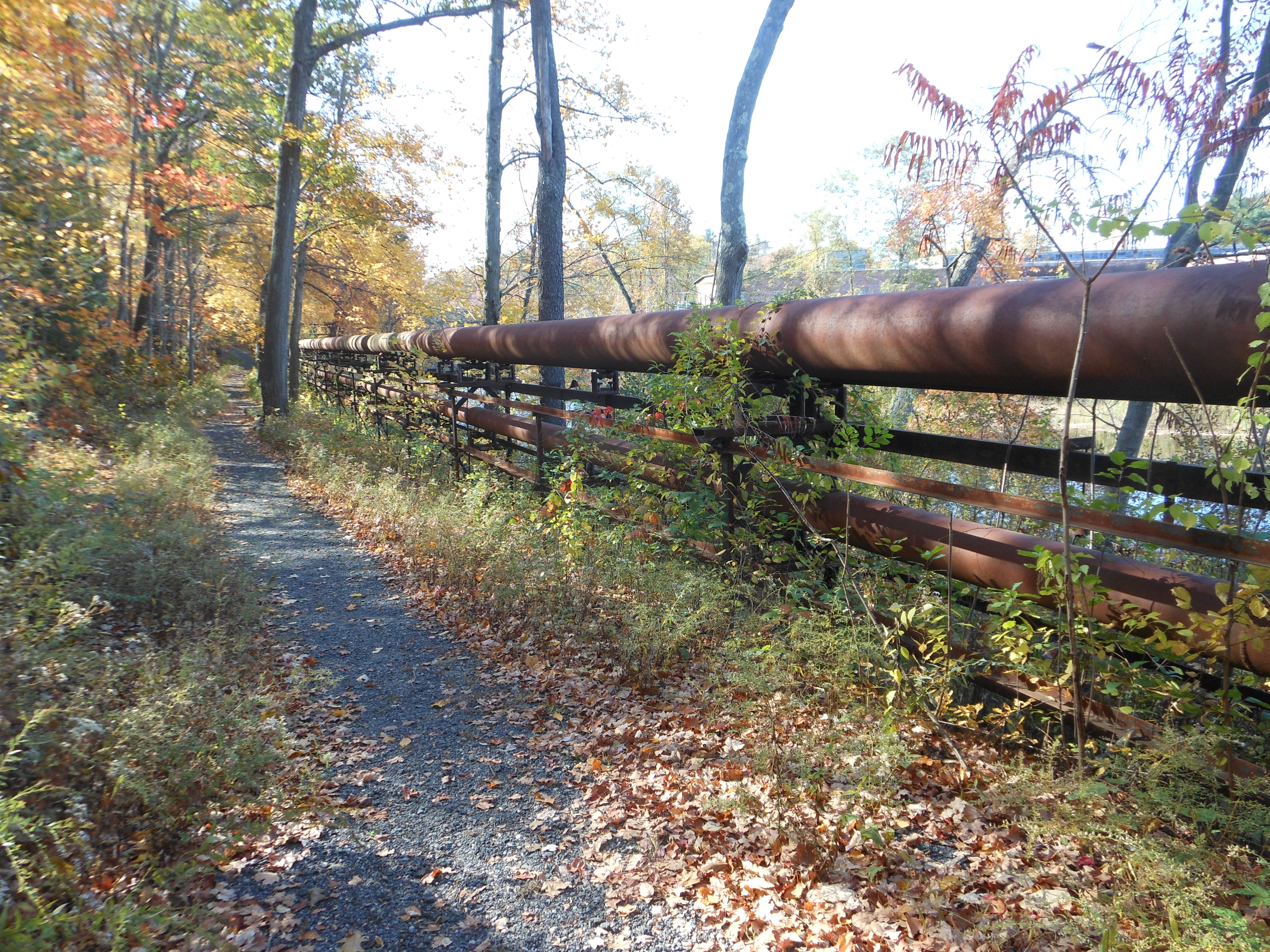
West Fitchburg Steamline Trail Park

- Coggshall Park — a 300-acre (120 ha) park established in 1894, which features wooded trails, access to Mirror Lake, a walking path, gazebo, stone house, playground, and disc golf course.
- Flat Rock Wild Life Sanctuary — a 326-acre (132 ha) wild life sanctuary.
- Fitchburg Abolitionist Park — created in 2017 by volunteers to honor the rich history of anti-slavery activism in the city, including its role in the Underground Railroad.
- West Fitchburg Steam Line Trail — a bike and walking path located in Fitchburg that is 0.6 acres (0.24 ha) long and runs along the Nashua River and Flag Brook in the Waites Corner neighborhood.
- Crocker Field — an athletic facility listed on the National Register of Historic Places.
- Coolidge Park — a multi-use park located off John Fitch Highway, containing 2 street hockey rinks, 4 baseball/softball fields, a swimming pool and walking path.
- Fitchburg Dog Park — a 1-acre fenced, off-leash dog park located off John Fitch Highway within Coolidge Park.

== Government ==
- Mayor: Samantha M. Squailia
- State Representative: Michael Kushmerek
- State Senator: John Cronin (D)
- Governor's Councilor: Paul DePalo (D)
- U.S. Representative: Lori Trahan (D-3rd District)
- U.S. Senators: Elizabeth Warren (D), Ed Markey (D)

Mayors
| # | Mayor | Term |
|---|---|---|
| 1st | Amasa Norcross | 1873–1875 |
| 2nd | Eugene Miles | 1875–1876 |
| 3rd | H. A. Blood | 1876–1877 |
| 4th | David H. Merriam | 1877–1879 |
| 5th | William H. Vose | 1879–1880 |
| 6th | Eli Culley | 1880–1882 |
| 7th | George Robbins | 1882–1883 |
| 8th | Alonzo Davis | 1883–1886 |
| 9th | Frederick Fosdick | 1886–1888 |
| 10th | Eli Culley | 1888–1890 |
| 11th | Charles S. Hayden | 1890–1891 |
| 12th | Samuel H. Graves | 1891–1893 |
| 13th | Arthur H. Lowe | 1893–1894 |
| 14th | Edgar S. Moulton | 1894–1896 |
| 15th | Henry F. Rockwell | 1896–1899 |
| 16th | Samuel Anderson | 1899–1901 |
| 17th | Charles Babbitt | 1901–1903 |
| 18th | Charles H. Blood | 1903–1904 |
| 19th | Henry O. Sawyer | 1904–1906 |
| 20th | James H. McMahon | 1906–1909 |
| 21st | M. Fred O'Connell | 1909–1912 |
| 22nd | Frank O. Hardy | 1912–1914 |
| 23rd | Benjamin A. Cook | 1914–1916 |
| 24th | Marcus Coolidge | 1916–1917 |
| 25th | Frank H. Foss | 1917–1921 |
| 26th | John B. Fellows | 1921–1925 |
| 27th | Joseph H. Delaney | 1925–1927 |
| 28th | Joseph A. Lowe | 1927–1929 |
| 29th | Joseph N. Carrier | 1929–1934 |
| 30th | Robert Greenwood | 1934–1938 |
| 31st | Alfred Woollacott | 1938–1948 |
| 32nd | George W. Stanton | 1948–1950 |
| 33rd | Peter J. Levanti | 1950–1956 |
| 34th | Hedly Bray | 1956–1960 |
| 35th | George Bourque | 1960–1968 |
| 36th | William G. Flynn | 1968–1971 |
| Acting | Harold Lemay | 1971–1972 |
| 37th | Carlton Blackwell | 1972–1974 |
| 38th | Hedly Bray | 1974–1978 |
| 39th | David M. Gilmartin | 1978–1984 |
| 40th | Bernard F. Chartrand | 1984–1988 |
| Acting | Ronald B. Ingemie | 1988 |
| 41st | Jeffery A. Bean | 1988–1997 |
| Acting | Ronald B. Ingemie | 1997–1998 |
| 42nd | Mary H. Whitney | 1998–2002 |
| 43rd | Dan H. Mylott | 2002–2008 |
| 44th | Lisa Wong | 2008–2016 |
| 45th | Stephen DiNatale | 2016–2024 |
| 46th | Samantha M. Squailia | 2024–present |

== Education ==
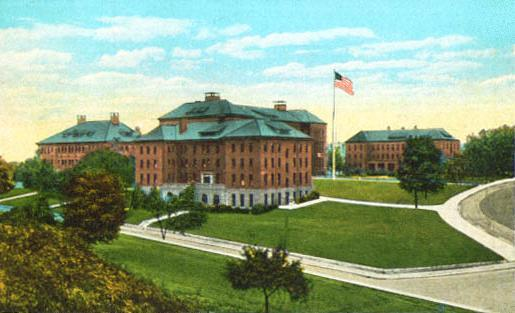
State Normal School c. 1920, now Fitchburg State University

Hammond Building, Fitchburg State University

=== Elementary schools ===
- Crocker Elementary School
- South Street Elementary School
- Reingold Elementary School
- Mckay Elementary School

=== Middle schools ===
- Memorial Middle School
- Longsjo Middle School

=== High schools ===
- Fitchburg High School
- Goodrich Academy
- Montachusett Regional Vocational Technical School, also called Monty Tech
- Sizer School

=== Private schools ===
- Applewild School
- Notre Dame Preparatory School
- St. Bernard's Elementary School
- St. Bernard's Central Catholic High School

St. Anthony of Padua School opened c. 1951 and closed in 2017. In its final year it had 144 students. Its closure meant that Fitchburg now has only one remaining Roman Catholic grade school.

=== Colleges and universities ===
- Fitchburg State University

Established in 1894 by an act of the Massachusetts Legislature, the State Normal School in Fitchburg opened in temporary quarters in the old high school building on Academy Street.

== Media ==
=== Newspapers ===
- Raivaaja
- Sentinel & Enterprise

=== Television ===
- Fitchburg has its own access TV station, Fitchburg Access Television. The station covers various local events, ranging from local school sports to municipal government meetings. FATV operates three Public, Education, and Government (PEG) channels. FATV channels can be viewed on Comcast (channels 8, 9, & 99) and on Verizon (channels 35, 36, & 37). FATV is not available on satellite TV.

=== Radio ===
- WPKZ, AM-1280 FM-105.3 Originally licensed in 1941
- WXPL, FM-91.3 Fitchburg State Radio
- WXLO, FM-104.5
- WQPH, FM-89.3 (Queen of Perpetual Help) Shirley/Fitchburg an EWTN Catholic Radio affiliate

== Infrastructure ==
=== Fire department ===
The Fitchburg Fire Department employs 81 firefighters, operating out of three stations. It responds to approximately 12,000 emergency calls annually.

=== Law enforcement ===
- Fitchburg Police Department, a full-service law enforcement agency responsible for 28 square miles (73 km^{2}) and 192 miles (310 km) of public road. The department responds to over 40,000 incidents each year.
- Worcester County Sheriff's Office
- Massachusetts State Police

=== Medical care ===
UMass Memorial Health operates a hospital in Fitchburg.

=== Transportation ===
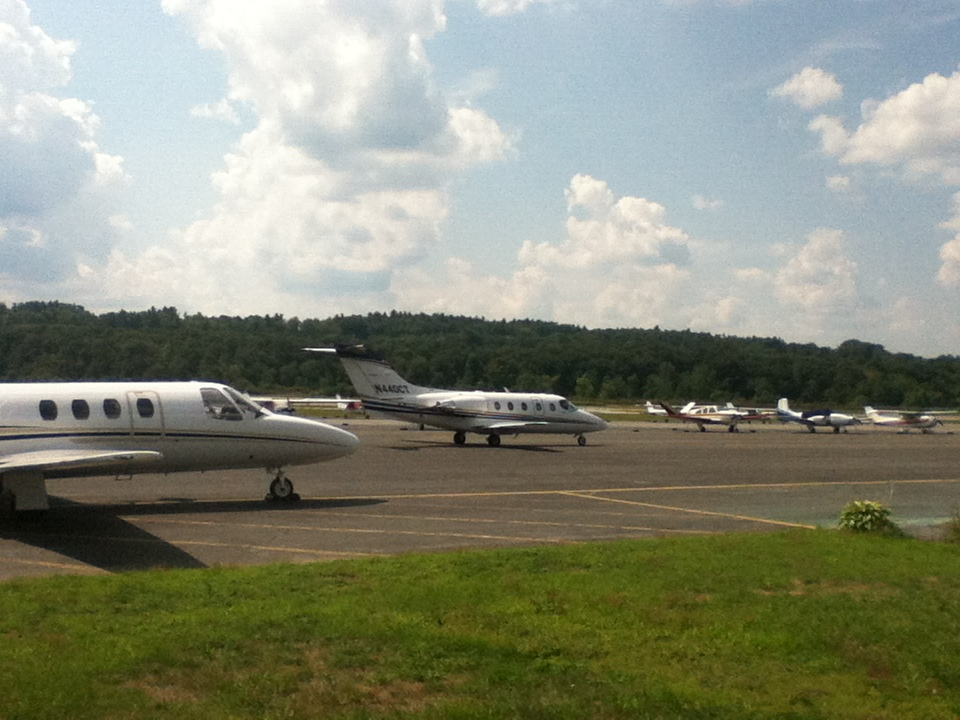
Fitchburg Municipal Airport

Transportation for Fitchburg is largely supplied by the Montachusett Regional Transit Authority (MART). MART operates fixed-route bus services, shuttle services, as well as paratransit services within the Montachusett Region. It also provides two connections to the MBTA Commuter Rail line at Fitchburg Station and Wachusett Station. The Fitchburg Station is the second to last stop on the Fitchburg Line from the North Station in Boston and the Wachusett Station is the last stop.

The Fitchburg Municipal Airport occupies 335 acres (136 ha) off Airport Road in Fitchburg near the Leominster border. In 1940, the airport land was donated to the City of Fitchburg and serves the greater Fitchburg area.

== Notable people ==
- Joseph Palmer, beard enthusiast
- Herbert Adams, sculptor of "WWI, Winged Glory" in the Upper Common of Fitchburg
- Amerie (Amerie Mi Marie Rogers), singer and actress
- Jacques Aubuchon, character actor
- Mike Barnicle, newspaper writer
- Michael Beasley, NBA player, high school All-American; attended Notre Dame Preparatory School
- Orlando Boss, Medal of Honor recipient from the American Civil War
- Ken Bouchard, former NASCAR driver, 1988 NASCAR Winston Cup Rookie of the Year
- Ron Bouchard, former NASCAR driver, 1981 NASCAR Winston Cup Rookie of the Year, former owner of many car dealerships
- Everett Francis Briggs, Catholic priest and miners' activist, born in Fitchburg, his life's mission was dedicated to the victims of the Monongah Mining Disaster
- Carolyn Brown, dancer, choreographer, and writer, danced with Merce Cunningham Dance Company
- Henry Sweetser Burrage, clergyman, editor, author, Maine historian
- James "Nixey" Callahan, Major League Baseball pitcher around the turn of the 20th century, later manager of the Chicago White Sox
- Herbert William Conn, zoologist and bacteriologist
- Marcus A. Coolidge, United States Senator
- Alvah Crocker, manufacturer and railroad promoter, United States Representative
- George Crowther, football player
- Kenneth Emory, anthropologist
- Donald Featherstone, artist and creator of the plastic flamingo lawn ornament
- Ryan Gomes, NBA player; attended Notre Dame Preparatory School
- Bruce Gordon, actor (Ishtar, Adam-12, Bonanza, Get Smart, and The Untouchables)
- Samuel W. Hale, member of the New Hampshire House of Representatives and the 39th Governor of New Hampshire
- Christian Hansen Jr., U.S. Marshal for Vermont
- Ripley Hitchcock, prominent editor
- Lempi Ikävalko, Finnish-born poet, author, journalist; for 30 years, editor at Fitchburg's Raivaaja newspaper
- George Juskalian, was a decorated Colonel of the United States Army who served for over three decades and fought in World War II, the Korean War and the Vietnam War.
- Viola Léger, American-born Canadian actress and politician
- Louise Freeland Jenkins, astronomer
- Iver Johnson, of Iver Johnson's Arms & Cycle Works, located in Fitchburg
- Rob Laakso, a renowned musician, record producer and engineer
- Erika Lawler, member of the 2009–10 United States national women's ice hockey team
- Ray LeBlanc, ice hockey goaltender
- John Legere, CEO of T-Mobile US
- Art Longsjo, Winter and Summer Olympian; Fitchburg Longsjo Classic is held in his memory
- Caroline Atherton Mason, poet
- Matti Mattson, American labor organizer, social activist, and Veteran of the Abraham Lincoln Brigade in the Spanish Civil War
- Hiram Maxim, inventor of the first self-powered machine gun
- Patricia Misslin, voice teacher and soprano
- Pat Moran, catcher and manager in Major League Baseball, managed the Philadelphia Phillies and the 1919 World Series champion Cincinnati Reds
- Clara Hapgood Nash (1839–1921), first woman to be admitted to the bar in New England; born in Fitchburg
- George Noory, host of Coast to Coast AM; spent some years in Fitchburg and occasionally mentions the city on his show
- Eleanor Norcross, founder of the Fitchburg Art Museum, artist, collector, social reformer
- Joseph Pilato, actor most known for Day of the Dead
- Benjamin A. Poore, U.S. Army major general
- Paul Price (musician), percussionist and composer
- Marion Rice, Denishawn dancer, teacher, choreographer, producer
- Charles L. Robinson, physician, journalist and first governor of Kansas
- Sylvanus Sawyer, inventor and manufacturer
- Asa Thurston, Hawaiian missionary
- Oskari Tokoi, editor of Raivaaja
- Ebenezer Torrey (1801–1888), lawyer, banker, politician
- George Arnold Torrey (1838–1911), politician, lawyer, and writer
- Calvin M. Woodward, St. Louis educator
- Samuel Worcester, clergyman noted for his participation in a controversy over Unitarianism
- Alan Shealy, American rower and Harvard graduate

== In popular culture ==
In Harry Potter universe, Fitchburg is the hometown of the professional Quidditch team the Fitchburg Finches.

The children's book Henry Hikes to Fitchburg by D.B. Johnson is set in Fitchburg.

In 2012, Dark Horse Comics published a comic book series entitled Falling Skies: The Battle of Fitchburg.

== Twin towns – sister cities ==
Fitchburg has four sister cities, as designated by Sister Cities International:

- Kleve, North Rhine-Westphalia, Germany
- Kokkola, Finland
- Tianjin, China
- Oni, Georgia

== See also ==
- Fitchburg Trappers
- Liberté de Fitchburg
- List of mill towns in Massachusetts
