= Travis LaBoy =

American football player (born 1981)

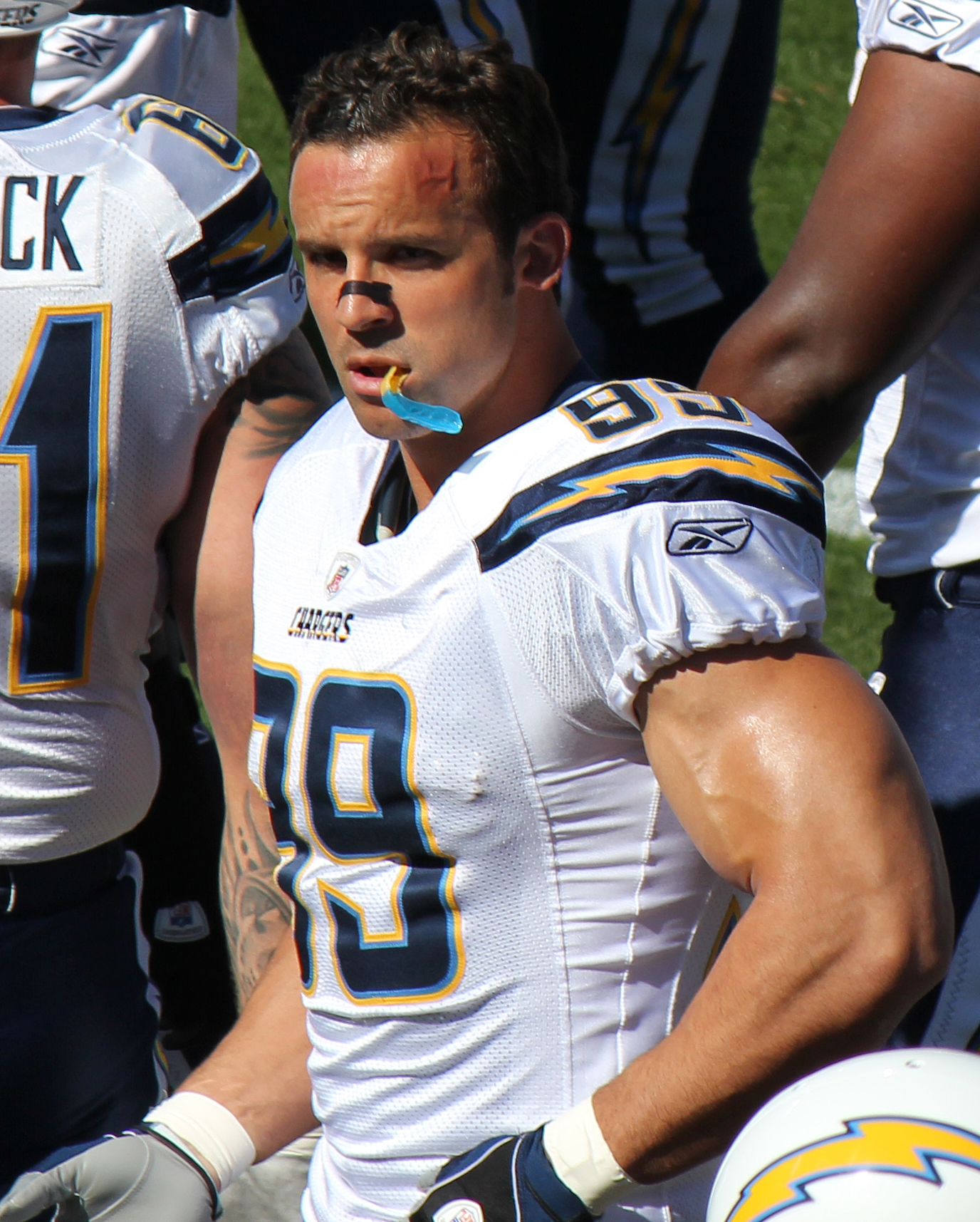
- LaBoy with the San Diego Chargers in 2011

No. 91, 55, 54, 99
- Positions: Linebacker, defensive end

Personal information
- Born: August 20, 1981 (age 45); Honolulu, Hawaii, U.S.
- Listed height: 6 ft 3 in (1.91 m)
- Listed weight: 250 lb (113 kg)

Career information
- High school: Marin Catholic (Kentfield, California)
- College: Hawaii
- NFL draft: 2004: 2nd round, 42nd overall pick

Career history
- Tennessee Titans (2004–2007); Arizona Cardinals (2008); San Francisco 49ers (2010); San Diego Chargers (2011)

Awards and highlights
- WAC Defensive Player of the Year (2003); First-team All-WAC (2003); Second-team All-WAC (2001)

Career NFL statistics
- Total tackles: 205
- Sacks: 29.5
- Forced fumbles: 8
- Fumble recoveries: 5
- Interceptions: 1
- Stats at Pro Football Reference

Travis LaBoy (born August 20, 1981) is an American former professional football player who was a defensive end and linebacker in the National Football League (NFL). He played college football for the Hawaii Warriors and was selected by the Tennessee Titans in the second round of the 2004 NFL draft.

LaBoy also played for the Arizona Cardinals, San Francisco 49ers, and San Diego Chargers.

== Early life ==
Travis Laboy attended Marin Catholic High School in Kentfield, California and lettered twice in football and basketball and three times in track. He was named an All-State, All-League and All-Conference choice as a senior, leading team to state title as a senior and league titles as a junior and sophomore. He was also the champion paddler in Northern California when he was a freshman.

== College career ==
LaBoy transferred to the University of Hawaiʻi at Mānoa after spending his freshman year as a redshirt at Utah State University.

As a sophomore, earned Second-team All-WAC honors, playing in nine games, starting six contests at right defensive end.

As a senior, LaBoy earned First-team All-WAC honors and was named the conference's Defensive Player of the Year. He was the recipient of the team's Alex Waterhouse Most Valuable Player Award. LaBoy Started 23 games at left defensive end, posting 76 tackles, five interceptions, and a conference-high 13 sacks.

== Professional career ==
=== Pre-draft ===
At the NFL Combine, he was timed in 4.7 seconds in the 40-yard dash, performed 35 repetitions of 225-pounds and a 35½" vertical jump.

=== Tennessee Titans ===
LaBoy was selected in the second with the 42nd overall pick in the 2004 NFL draft by the Tennessee Titans. As a rookie, in 13 games with two starts, he totaled 34 tackles, 3.5 sacks, nine QB pressures, one tackle for a loss and one fumble recovery. A concussion forced him to miss all of preseason and to be deactivated for the first three games of the regular season. In 2005, he appeared in 15 games with seven starts for the Titans and posted 27 tackles with 14 assists and 6.5 sacks. In 2006, LaBoy played in 13 games with a career-high 11 starts at right defensive end. In 2007, he appeared in 13 games for the Titans and tied for third on the team with six sacks.

=== Arizona Cardinals ===
On March 3, 2008, the Arizona Cardinals signed LaBoy to a five-year $22 million contract with $7.5 million guaranteed. LaBoy got off to a hot start with four sacks in the first four games in 2008 but a biceps injury slowed him the rest of the season. Cardinals coach Ken Whisenhunt confirmed that LaBoy would need surgery to repair his torn biceps. LaBoy was released on April 28, 2009.

=== San Francisco 49ers ===
After missing the entire 2009 season after recovering from reconstructive foot surgery and biceps surgery, LaBoy signed with the San Francisco 49ers on April 20, 2010. On December 18, LaBoy was placed on the injured reserve with a knee problem, ending his season. LaBoy finished his 2010 season with five sacks and 28 tackles.

=== San Diego Chargers ===
On July 29, 2011, the San Diego Chargers signed LaBoy to a 2-year contract. He was released by the Chargers on May 7, 2012. LaBoy retired after his release from the San Diego Chargers.

== NFL career statistics ==
Legend
**Bold**	Career high

=== Regular season ===
Year	Team	Games		Tackles					Interceptions					Fumbles			
Year	Team	GP	GS	Cmb	Solo	Ast	Sck	TFL	Int	Yds	TD	Lng	PD	FF	FR	Yds	TD
2004	TEN	13	2	21	13	8	3.5	1	0	0	0	0	0	0	**1**	0	0
2005	TEN	**15**	7	**42**	28	**14**	**6.5**	6	0	0	0	0	1	0	**1**	0	0
2006	TEN	13	11	32	22	10	3.5	**8**	0	0	0	0	1	1	0	0	0
2007	TEN	13	0	13	8	5	6.0	2	**1**	0	0	0	**4**	**4**	**1**	0	0
2008	ARI	13	12	31	25	6	4.0	3	0	0	0	0	0	1	**1**	0	0
2010	SFO	14	0	28	21	7	5.0	6	0	0	0	0	2	1	**1**	0	0
2011	SDG	14	**14**	38	**30**	8	1.0	3	0	0	0	0	1	1	0	0	0
		95	46	205	147	58	29.5	29	1	0	0	0	9	8	5	0	0

=== Playoffs ===
Year	Team	Games		Tackles					Interceptions					Fumbles			
Year	Team	GP	GS	Cmb	Solo	Ast	Sck	TFL	Int	Yds	TD	Lng	PD	FF	FR	Yds	TD
2007	TEN	1	0	0	0	0	0.0	0	0	0	0	0	0	0	0	0	0
2008	ARI	**3**	0	**2**	**2**	0	0.0	0	0	0	0	0	0	0	0	0	0
		4	0	2	2	0	0.0	0	0	0	0	0	0	0	0	0	0

== Personal life ==
LaBoy is the son of former U. Hawaii DE Cliff LaBoy (1973–75). He is married to wife Laura Marie Laboy.
