= Albert Haynesworth =

American football player (born 1981)

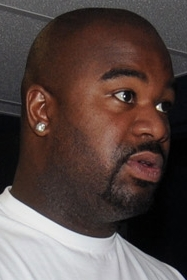
- Haynesworth in 2009

No. 91, 92, 95
- Position: Defensive tackle

Personal information
- Born: June 17, 1981 (age 45); Hartsville, South Carolina, U.S.
- Listed height: 6 ft 6 in (1.98 m)
- Listed weight: 350 lb (159 kg)

Career information
- High school: Hartsville
- College: Tennessee (1999–2001)
- NFL draft: 2002: 1st round, 15th overall pick

Career history
- Tennessee Titans (2002–2008); Washington Redskins (2009–2010); New England Patriots (2011); Tampa Bay Buccaneers (2011)

Awards and highlights
- 2× First-team All-Pro (2007, 2008); 2× Pro Bowl (2007, 2008); Second-team All-SEC (2001)

Career NFL statistics
- Total tackles: 347
- Sacks: 30.5
- Forced fumbles: 6
- Fumble recoveries: 4
- Pass deflections: 26
- Stats at Pro Football Reference

Albert George Haynesworth III (born June 17, 1981) is an American former professional football defensive tackle who played in the National Football League (NFL) for 10 seasons. He played college football for the Tennessee Volunteers football and was selected by the Tennessee Titans in the first round of the 2002 NFL draft. Haynesworth was a member of the Titans for seven seasons, where he was regarded as one of the league's top defensive tackles between 2007 and 2008 and earned two consecutive Pro Bowl and first-team All-Pro selections.

A highly coveted free agent after his 2008 campaign, Haynesworth signed a seven-year, $100 million contract with the Washington Redskins, but only played 20 games in two seasons until he was traded in 2011. As a result, the Redskins' acquisition of Haynesworth is considered among the worst free agent signings in NFL history. He played his final season in 2011 with the New England Patriots and Tampa Bay Buccaneers.

== Early life ==
Haynesworth was born in Hartsville, South Carolina. He attended Hartsville High School, and participated in football and track, throwing the shot put. Haynesworth accounted for 150 tackles, 56 tackles for loss, six sacks, and six fumble recoveries as a junior; he followed that by tallying 110 tackles, 51 quarterback pressures, and six sacks as a senior in 1998.

Following his senior season, Haynesworth was named a SuperPrep and Rivalnet All-American, and was also rated the fourth-best defensive lineman and the 14th-ranked overall player in the nation according to ESPN's Top 100, while National Recruiting Advisor rated him as the best defensive tackle in the country. He was a member of the University of Tennessee Volunteers' 1999 recruiting class.

== College career ==
As a student-athlete at the University of Tennessee, Haynesworth was a three-year letterman for the Tennessee Volunteers football team under head coach Phillip Fulmer. He lined up at the right defensive tackle position next to John Henderson. He compiled 66 tackles, five sacks, 31 quarterback pressures, 20 tackles for a loss, and nine pass deflections during his collegiate career. He earned Sporting News Freshman All-American honors in 1999 and was named Second-team All-Southeastern Conference after his junior season.

== Professional career ==
=== 2002 NFL draft ===
Considered "potentially a brutal run-stopper" by The New York Times, Haynesworth was selected by the Tennessee Titans in the first round with the 15th overall pick in the 2002 NFL draft. He was the fourth defensive tackle selected from a draft class considered to be loaded with talented defensive linemen. At Tennessee's Pro Day in 2002, when he was 20 years old, Haynesworth measured at 6-feet-6 and 317 pounds, ran a 4.82 40-yard dash, and had a 39-inch vertical jump and a 9-foot, 7-inch broad jump. He did not work out at the 2002 NFL Combine.

Pre-draft measurables
Height	Weight	40-yard dash	Vertical jump	Broad jump	Bench press
6 ft 5 5/8 in (1.97 m)	317 lb (144 kg)	4.82 s	39 in (0.99 m)	9 ft 7 in (2.92 m)	39 reps
All values from Tennessee's Pro Day

=== Tennessee Titans ===
==== 2002 season ====
Haynesworth made his NFL debut in the Titans' 2002 regular season opener against the Philadelphia Eagles and had two tackles. He made his first NFL start in Week 15 against the New England Patriots. He finished his rookie season with 16 appearances and three starts. He had one sack, 30 total tackles, and three passes defended. He started in the Titans' two postseason games that year.

==== 2003 season ====
An incident foreshadowing future incidents with Haynesworth occurred at a Titans training camp in 2003, where Haynesworth kicked his former teammate, center Justin Hartwig, in the chest, then had to be restrained by other teammates.

In the 2003 season, Haynesworth had 2.5 sacks, 32 total tackles, four passes defended, and two fumble recoveries in 12 games and 11 starts in the regular season. He started the Titans' two playoff games and recorded one sack and five total tackles.

==== 2004 season ====
In the 2004 season, Haynesworth appeared in and started ten games. He finished with one sack, 37 total tackles, three passes defended, and two forced fumbles.

==== 2005 season ====
In the 2005 season, Haynesworth appeared in and started 14 games. He finished with three sacks, 52 total tackles, one pass defended, and one forced fumble.

==== 2006 season ====
===== Stomping incident =====
On October 1, 2006, in the third quarter of a game against the Dallas Cowboys, Cowboys running back Julius Jones scored on a rushing play. During the play, Cowboys center Andre Gurode fell to the ground, and his helmet was removed by Haynesworth, who then attempted to stomp on Gurode's head, but missed. A second stomp opened a severe wound on Gurode's forehead, narrowly missing his right eye.

Referee Jerome Boger assessed Haynesworth a 15-yard unsportsmanlike conduct penalty, to which Haynesworth protested by taking off his helmet and throwing it into the turf; Haynesworth was then assessed an additional 15-yard penalty and ejected.

Gurode later received 30 stitches just above and below his right eye. After the game, Titans head coach Jeff Fisher apologized on behalf of the Titans organization to Cowboys head coach Bill Parcells. After the game, Haynesworth apologized, saying "What I did out there was disgusting. It doesn't matter what the league does to me. The way I feel right now, you just can't describe it." Gurode later said that he would not seek criminal charges against Haynesworth. He continued to experience headaches and blurred vision for several days following the incident.

Video evidence of the play shows Haynesworth bend down towards Gurode prior to his helmet being off and prior to the stomps. Because the view is partially blocked by other players it is unclear whether Haynesworth manually removes the helmet. Therefore, most media outlets reported simply that Gurode's helmet was off. However, hometown columnist Mickey Spagnola of DallasCowboys.com argued that Haynesworth pulled off Gurode's helmet.

On October 2, 2006, Haynesworth was suspended for five games without pay by the NFL. The suspension was only the second multi-game suspension in NFL history for an on-the-field incident, more than twice as long as the previous longest suspension, given in 1986 by then-commissioner Pete Rozelle to Green Bay nose tackle Charles Martin for body-slamming Bears quarterback Jim McMahon. Based on his 2006 base salary of $646,251, Haynesworth forfeited more than $190,000 in salary. Roger Goodell, who had recently become NFL's commissioner in the past month, stated that there was "absolutely no place in the game, or anywhere else" for Haynesworth's behavior. However, ESPN's Mark Schlereth, a 12-year NFL veteran, felt that Haynesworth should have been suspended for the rest of the season. Haynesworth's suspension was the longest for an in-game incident in NFL history until it was surpassed by Vontaze Burfict, who was suspended 12 games plus the 2019 playoffs for repeated violations of helmet hit rules.

The NFL Players Association initially planned to appeal the suspension, calling it too severe. However, Haynesworth said on October 3 that he would not appeal, after personally apologizing to Gurode on the same day. In a press conference on October 5, Haynesworth apologized to all who watched the game and said he had entered counseling to control his emotions. He also said that he would work with children in the Nashville area.

Fisher told Parcells after the game that the Titans would punish Haynesworth themselves if they felt that the NFL's punishment was not serious enough. On the same day as Haynesworth's press conference, Fisher told a national radio show that the Cowboys game may have been Haynesworth's last as a Titan. The team had the option of either deactivating him for the remaining seven games of the season or releasing him. Had the Titans released him, they had enough room under the salary cap to absorb the $5.5 million they would owe him for 2007.

Haynesworth was eligible to return on November 19 for the Titans' game against the Philadelphia Eagles. Even so, on, there was no guarantee that he would play. Haynesworth's agent, Chad Speck, told several media outlets that Haynesworth fully expected to return to practice on November 13, and he did indeed report that day. He played against the Eagles on November 19, and recorded one tackle. He finished the 2006 season with two sacks, 30 total tackles, and two passes defended in 11 games and starts.

==== 2007 season ====
On September 9, 2007, in the season opener against the Jacksonville Jaguars, Haynesworth was called for unnecessary roughness when he slammed running back Maurice Jones-Drew to the ground after a tackle. He was fined $5,000 by the NFL for this incident. In Week 9, against the Carolina Panthers, he registered a career-high three sacks in the 20–7 victory.

Haynesworth was elected to the Pro Bowl for the first time for the 2007 NFL season. In addition, he earned first team All-Pro honors. During this season following the stomping incident, he ranked second on the team with six sacks in his 11 games played up to the selection, led or tied for the team-high in total tackles three times that season, and led or tied the team-high in quarterback pressures five times. At the point where the Pro Bowl selection was made, the Titans had an 8–3 record in games in which Haynesworth started and were 0–3 in games in which he did not play.

Haynesworth said of his Pro Bowl selection, "It's an awesome feeling. It's kind of a load off my back because I didn't want last year's suspension to define my career. It was a difficult time in my life, but I was determined to keep working hard to get to this point and earn the respect of my teammates, coaches and fans." Haynesworth failed to sign with Tennessee due to the deadline of signing a franchise tagged player.

==== 2008 season ====
In the 2008 season, Haynesworth appeared in and started 14 games. He finished with 8.5 sacks, 51 total tackles, two passes defended, and three forced fumbles. Haynesworth was named to the Pro Bowl and earned first team All-Pro honors for the 2008 season. He was named Defensive Player of the Year by The Sporting News.

=== Washington Redskins ===
An unrestricted free agent in the 2009 off-season, Haynesworth signed a seven-year, $100 million contract with the Washington Redskins on the first day of free agency, February 27, 2009. This was despite being offered more money by the Tampa Bay Buccaneers. The deal was expected to pay Haynesworth $32 million in the first 13 months, included $41 million guaranteed, and could have reached $115 million if all incentives were met. Tennessee's final offer to Haynesworth reportedly amounted to a four-year package worth $34 million total, with about $20 million in guarantees. Haynesworth reported on Sirius Blitz that the Tampa Bay Buccaneers offered him a $120 million deal that could potentially increase by 20%. He says that he took a discount to play with the Redskins because of their large fan base and media outlet, something that he also did not have in Tennessee. In April 2009, the Titans asked the NFL to consider tampering charges against the Redskins, claiming that the Redskins contacted Haynesworth before the free agency period began on February 27.

From the beginning of his time with the Redskins, Haynesworth presented problems for the coaching staffs of both Jim Zorn and Mike Shanahan. After a 45–12 loss to the New York Giants on Monday Night Football in 2009, Haynesworth questioned the scheme of defensive coordinator Greg Blache, and stated that he could not "survive another season in this system if it stays the way it is." After the 2009 season he refused to participate in off-season workouts, and arrived at camp in poor physical condition, unable to pass a basic fitness test. He also felt inexperienced and unfamiliar with the team's 3–4 defensive scheme introduced by Shanahan, having previously played in a 4–3 scheme in Tennessee and in his first season in Washington. In the 2009 season, Haynesworth appeared in and started 12 games. He finished with four sacks, 37 total tackles, and five passes defended.

On December 7, 2010, it was announced that Haynesworth would not participate for the remainder of the season. There had been conflicts throughout the 2010 preseason with Haynesworth and the coaching staff. After a dispute over his absence at a practice in which Haynesworth claimed to be ill, the team suspended him for "conduct detrimental to the club". Head coach Mike Shanahan said the suspension followed a refusal by Haynesworth to cooperate in a variety of ways and not only because of the practice absence.

During the 2010 season, Haynesworth had a career-low 13 tackles and just 2.5 sacks in eight games, leading the NFL Network to name the signing of Haynesworth as the "worst free-agency move of the last decade." Many other NFL writers have gone further, calling Haynesworth the worst free agent bust in NFL history. Haynesworth created some controversy in March 2015 when he likened Ndamukong Suh's six-year, $114 million contract to his previous contract with the Redskins.

=== New England Patriots ===
Haynesworth was traded to the New England Patriots on July 28, 2011, for a fifth-round draft pick in the 2013 NFL draft. He lasted less than four months with the Patriots, and on November 8, Haynesworth was placed on waivers. His placement on waivers came days after he got into a confrontation with assistant Pepper Johnson on the sidelines.

=== Tampa Bay Buccaneers ===
Two days after being released by the Patriots, Haynesworth was claimed off waivers by the Tampa Bay Buccaneers. He appeared in seven games for Tampa Bay and started six. On February 15, 2012, he was released by the team.

== NFL career statistics ==
Year	Team	GP	Tackles				Fumbles		Interceptions					
Year	Team	GP	Cmb	Solo	Ast	Sck	FF	FR	Int	Yds	Avg	Lng	TD	PD
2002	TEN	16	30	21	9	1.0	0	0	0	0	0.0	0	0	3
2003	TEN	12	32	21	11	2.5	0	2	0	0	0.0	0	0	4
2004	TEN	10	36	25	11	1.0	2	0	0	0	0.0	0	0	2
2005	TEN	14	52	36	16	3.0	1	0	0	0	0.0	0	0	1
2006	TEN	11	30	23	7	2.0	0	0	0	0	0.0	0	0	2
2007	TEN	13	40	32	8	6.0	0	0	0	0	0.0	0	0	4
2008	TEN	14	51	41	10	8.5	3	1	0	0	0.0	0	0	2
2009	WAS	12	37	29	8	4.0	0	1	0	0	0.0	0	0	5
2010	WAS	8	16	13	3	2.5	0	0	0	0	0.0	0	0	1
2011	NE	6	3	2	1	0.0	0	0	0	0	0.0	0	0	0
2011	TB	7	20	18	2	0.0	0	0	0	0	0.0	0	0	2
Career		123	347	261	86	30.5	6	4	0	0	0.0	0	0	26

== Legal issues ==
Arrest warrants were issued against Haynesworth in two Tennessee counties in May 2006 stemming from a traffic incident on Interstate 40. Both sets of charges were dropped in June 2006. The judge in the Putnam County case tossed the charges on the grounds that the alleged offense happened out of their jurisdiction. In Smith County, the district attorney dismissed the charges. In March 2009, Haynesworth was indicted on two misdemeanor traffic charges stemming from a December 2008 car accident in Tennessee. In an accident on Interstate 65, Corey Edmonson was partially paralyzed after Haynesworth drove his Ferrari into Edmonson's car. Haynesworth was driving in excess of 100 miles per hour (160 km/h) when he struck Edmonson's vehicle, which then struck a concrete barrier.

On June 22, 2010, it was reported that Clayton Bank & Trust was suing Haynesworth, alleging that Haynesworth had failed to make payments on a loan in the amount of more than $2.38 million. The suit was filed in the Knox County Chancery Court on June 18, 2010. According to papers, Haynesworth entered a commercial loan agreement for the original principal amount of $2,381,688.58 on June 27, 2009. On February 27, 2009, the two parties entered into an Extension Agreement with an effective date of February 27, 2010, according to the suit. The attorney for Clayton Bank & Trust, Hugh B. Ward Jr., was seeking a little over $2.4 million.

In 2010, Silvia Mena, a stripper from New York, claimed in a $10 million lawsuit that Haynesworth impregnated her and left her with no financial assistance.

In 2011, Haynesworth allegedly threw a punch to the nose of Joel Velazques, 38, of Leesburg, Virginia during a traffic altercation.

In January 2015, Haynesworth pled guilty for reckless boating charges.

On September 28, 2020, Haynesworth was arrested in Cleveland, Tennessee, and charged with domestic assault after he was accused of yelling at and threatening his former girlfriend and her boyfriend.

== In popular culture ==
In a response to Haynesworth's failure to pass the Redskins' conditioning test in July 2010, the edition of August 27, 2010, of satire news organization The Onion ran the headline (with an accompanying photo), "Report: Albert Haynesworth Just A Mound Of Ice Cream And Hot Dogs."

== Health ==
On July 7, 2019, Haynesworth revealed that his kidneys were failing and was seeking a donor for transplant. In April 2021, Haynesworth successfully received a transplanted kidney.
