= Chris Henry (running back) =

American football player (born 1985)

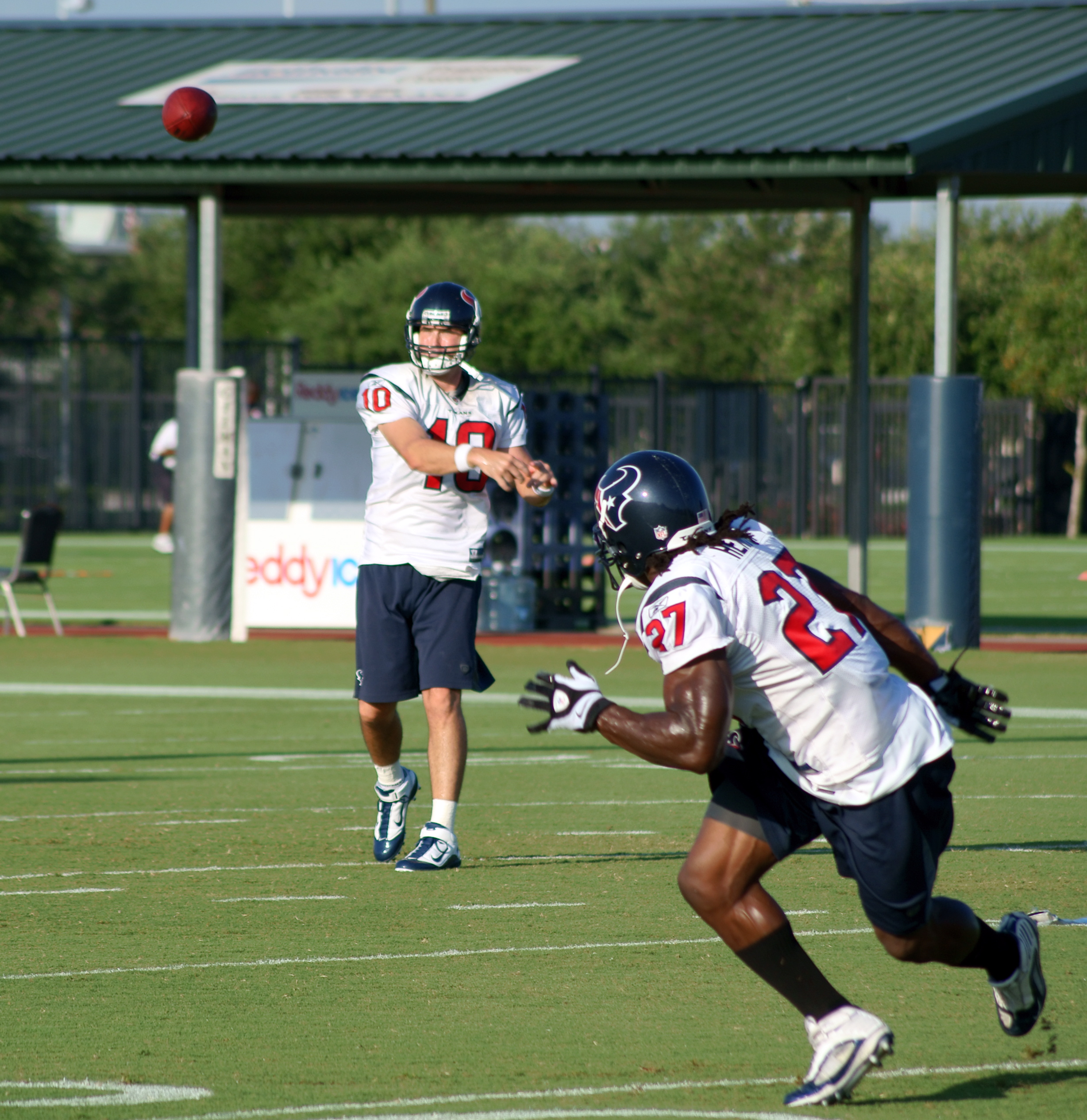
- Henry receives a pass from John David Booty in 2010

No. 42, 40, 27
- Position: Running back

Personal information
- Born: June 6, 1985 (age 41); Oakland, California, U.S.
- Listed height: 5 ft 11 in (1.80 m)
- Listed weight: 234 lb (106 kg)

Career information
- High school: Edison (Stockton, California)
- College: Arizona
- NFL draft: 2007: 2nd round, 50th overall pick

Career history
- Tennessee Titans (2007–2009); Houston Texans (2009); Seattle Seahawks (2010)

Career NFL statistics
- Rushing attempts: 32
- Rushing yards: 122
- Rushing touchdowns: 2
- Receptions: 6
- Receiving yards: 53
- Return yards: 272
- Stats at Pro Football Reference

Chris John Henry (born June 6, 1985) is an American former professional football player who was a running back in the National Football League (NFL). He was selected by the Tennessee Titans in the second round of the 2007 NFL draft. He played college football for the Arizona Wildcats.

Henry was also a member of the Houston Texans and Seattle Seahawks.

== College career ==
Henry played college football at the University of Arizona. In 2003, Henry played only two games after being sidelined by a leg injury. In 2004, he played in 11 games as a redshirt freshman finishing the season with 159 rushing yards on 56 carries, and two touchdowns. In 2005, he finished with 34 carries for 119 yards playing on kicking units and in backup backfield duty in all 11 games. In 2006, he took over as the starter after serving as a backup for Mike Bell and Gilbert Harris. He finished the season with 581 rushing yards on 165 carries and 7 touchdowns. On December 18, 2006, Henry announced that he had decided to forgo his senior year and enter the NFL draft early.

== Professional career ==
=== Pre-draft ===
Henry ran a 4.41 40-yard dash, lifted 26 reps of 225 lbs, and displayed a 36-inch vertical leap at the NFL Scouting Combine.

Pre-draft measurables
Height	Weight	Arm length	Hand span	40-yard dash	10-yard split	20-yard split	20-yard shuttle	Three-cone drill	Vertical jump	Broad jump	Bench press
5 ft 11 1/4 in (1.81 m)	230 lb (104 kg)	31 1/4 in (0.79 m)	10 1/4 in (0.26 m)	4.41 s	1.56 s	2.57 s	4.14 s	6.96 s	36.0 in (0.91 m)	10 ft 7 in (3.23 m)	26 reps
All values from NFL Combine

=== Tennessee Titans ===
Henry was selected in the second round (50th overall pick) of the 2007 NFL draft by the Tennessee Titans. On November 3, 2007, Henry received a four-game suspension from the NFL for violating the league's substance abuse policy. Henry reportedly tested positive for a banned prescription medication that is not performance-enhancing. He finished his rookie season rushing for 119 yards on 31 carries and two touchdowns in seven games.

During his second season Henry played in only one game and got only one carry for three yards.

Henry was released by the Titans on September 29, 2009.

=== Houston Texans ===
Henry was signed to the Houston Texans practice squad on October 6, 2009. On December 9 he was added to the active roster. He was waived on September 3, 2010.

=== Seattle Seahawks ===
Henry was signed to the Seattle Seahawks practice squad on September 6, 2010. He was re-signed to the Seahawks active roster on October 23, 2010. He was released on August 3, 2011.
