= 2007 Tennessee Titans season =

48th season in franchise history

- Owner: Bud Adams
- General manager: Mike Reinfeldt
- Head coach: Jeff Fisher
- Offensive coordinator: Norm Chow
- Defensive coordinator: Jim Schwartz
- Home stadium: LP Field

Results
- Record: 10–6
- Division place: 3rd AFC South
- Playoffs: Lost Wild Card Playoffs (at Chargers) 6–17
- All-Pros: DT Albert Haynesworth (1st team); K Rob Bironas (1st team)
- Pro Bowlers: DT Albert Haynesworth; DE Kyle Vanden Bosch; K Rob Bironas

The 2007 Tennessee Titans season was the franchise's 38th season in the National Football League (NFL) and the 48th overall. It also marked the franchise's 11th season in the state of Tennessee and the 14th under head coach Jeff Fisher. They improved from their 8–8 record from 2006 to a 10–6 record, and made the playoffs for the first time since 2003. However their season ended with a loss to the San Diego Chargers in the wild card round.

== Offseason ==
=== NFL draft ===
2007 Tennessee Titans draft
Round	Pick	Player	Position	College	Notes
1	19	Michael Griffin *	Safety	Texas	
2	50	Chris Henry	Running back	Arizona	
3	80	Paul Williams	Wide receiver	Fresno State	
4	115	Leroy Harris	Center	NC State	
4	128	Chris Davis	Wide receiver	Florida State	from Baltimore
5	152	Antonio Johnson	Defensive tackle	Mississippi State	
6	188	Joel Filani	Wide receiver	Texas Tech	
6	204	Jacob Ford	Defensive end	Central Arkansas	from San Diego
6	206	Ryan Smith	Cornerback	Florida	
7	223	Mike Otto	Offensive tackle	Purdue	
Made roster * Made at least one Pro Bowl during career

=== Undrafted free agents ===
2007 undrafted free agents of note
Player	Position	College
Danny Ware	Running back	Georgia
Biren Ealy	Wide receiver	Houston

== Personnel ==
=== Staff ===
2007 Tennessee Titans staff
Front office: Founder/owner/chairman of the board/president/CEO – Bud Adams; Executive VP/general manager/director of football operations – Mike Reinfeldt; Director of college scouting – Mike Ackerley; National coordinator of college scouting – C. O. Brocato; Director of pro scouting – Lake Dawson; Head coaches: Executive vice president/head coach – Jeff Fisher; Assistant head coach/linebackers – Dave McGinnis; Offensive coaches: Offensive coordinator – Norm Chow; Quarterbacks – Craig Johnson; Running backs – Sherman Smith; Wide receivers – Fred Graves; Tight ends - John Zernhelt; Offensive line – Mike Munchak; Offensive assistant/quality control – Ned James	Defensive coaches: Defensive coordinator – Jim Schwartz; Defensive line - Jim Washburn; Defensive backs – Everett Withers; Safeties and nickel backs – Chuck Cecil; Assistant secondary - Marcus Robertson; Defensive quality control – Matt Burke; Special teams coaches: Special teams – Alan Lowry; Assistant special teams – Marty Galbraith; Strength and conditioning: Strength and conditioning – Steve Watterson

=== Final roster ===
2007 Tennessee Titans roster
Quarterbacks (QB): 5 Kerry Collins; 10 Vince Young; Running backs (RB): 29 Chris Brown; 48 Casey Cramer FB; 45 Ahmard Hall FB; 42 Chris Henry; 25 LenDale White; Wide receivers (WR): 17 Chris Davis; 82 Biren Ealy; 12 Justin Gage; 83 Eric Moulds; 18 Mike Williams; 11 Paul Williams; 86 Roydell Williams; Tight ends (TE): 88 Ben Hartsock; 80 Bo Scaife; 84 Ben Troupe	Offensive linemen (OL): 54 Eugene Amano C; 60 Jacob Bell G; 64 Leroy Harris G; 70 Daniel Loper T; 68 Kevin Mawae C; 75 Benji Olson G; 71 Michael Roos T; 76 David Stewart T; Defensive linemen (DL): 97 Tony Brown DT; 77 Sean Conover DE; 94 Bryce Fisher DE; 92 Albert Haynesworth DT; 91 Travis LaBoy DE; 98 Antwan Odom DE; 90 Randy Starks DT; 93 Kyle Vanden Bosch DE; 96 Kevin Vickerson DT	Linebackers (LB): 56 Colin Allred OLB; 53 Keith Bulluck OLB; 51 Jorge Cordova OLB; 59 Gilbert Gardner OLB; 57 Rich Scanlon MLB; 50 David Thornton OLB; 55 Stephen Tulloch MLB; Defensive backs (DB): 31 Cortland Finnegan CB; 22 Vincent Fuller FS; 33 Michael Griffin FS; 20 Nick Harper CB; 31 Kelly Herndon CB; 21 Reynaldo Hill CB; 28 Chidi Iwuoma CB; 37 Calvin Lowry FS; 23 Donnie Nickey SS; Special teams (ST): 2 Rob Bironas K; 40 Jeremy Cain LS; 15 Craig Hentrich P	Practice squad: 49 Kurt Campbell OLB; 26 Marquice Cole CB; 35 Quinton Ganther RB; 3 Ingle Martin QB; 67 Fred Matua G; 69 Jason Murphy C; 66 Mike Otto OT; 85 Jamie Petrowski TE; 79 Ulrich Winkler DE (IPP); Reserve: 58 Ken Amato LS (IR); 78 Jacob Ford DE (IR); 52 Ryan Fowler MLB (IR); 87 David Givens WR (PUP); 24 Chris Hope S (IR); 99 Antonio Johnson DT (IR); 32 Adam Jones CB (Susp.); 81 Brandon Jones WR (IR); 30 Eric King CB (IR); Rookies in italics 53 active, 9 reserve, 9 practice squad

== Schedule ==
=== Preseason ===
Week	Date	Opponent	Result	Record	Venue	Recap
1	August 11	Washington Redskins	L 6–14	0–1	LP Field	Recap
2	August 17	at New England Patriots	W 27–24	1–1	Gillette Stadium	Recap
3	August 24	at Buffalo Bills	W 28–17	2–1	Ralph Wilson Stadium	Recap
4	August 30	Green Bay Packers	W 30–14	3–1	LP Field	Recap

=== Regular season ===
Week	Date	Opponent	Result	Record	Venue	Recap
1	September 9	at Jacksonville Jaguars	W 13–10	1–0	Jacksonville Municipal Stadium	Recap
2	September 16	Indianapolis Colts	L 20–22	1–1	LP Field	Recap
3	September 24	at New Orleans Saints	W 31–14	2–1	Louisiana Superdome	Recap
4	Bye					
5	October 7	Atlanta Falcons	W 20–13	3–1	LP Field	Recap
6	October 14	at Tampa Bay Buccaneers	L 10–13	3–2	Raymond James Stadium	Recap
7	October 21	at Houston Texans	W 38–36	4–2	Reliant Stadium	Recap
8	October 28	Oakland Raiders	W 13–9	5–2	LP Field	Recap
9	November 4	Carolina Panthers	W 20–7	6–2	LP Field	Recap
10	November 11	Jacksonville Jaguars	L 13–28	6–3	LP Field	Recap
11	November 19	at Denver Broncos	L 20–34	6–4	Invesco Field at Mile High	Recap
12	November 25	at Cincinnati Bengals	L 6–35	6–5	Paul Brown Stadium	Recap
13	December 2	Houston Texans	W 28–20	7–5	LP Field	Recap
14	December 9	San Diego Chargers	L 17–23 (OT)	7–6	LP Field	Recap
15	December 16	at Kansas City Chiefs	W 26–17	8–6	Arrowhead Stadium	Recap
16	December 23	New York Jets	W 10–6	9–6	LP Field	Recap
17	December 30	at Indianapolis Colts	W 16–10	10–6	RCA Dome	Recap

== Standings ==
AFC South
	W	L	T	PCT	DIV	CONF	PF	PA	STK
^{(2)} Indianapolis Colts	13	3	0	.813	5–1	9–3	450	262	L1
^{(5)} Jacksonville Jaguars	11	5	0	.688	2–4	8–4	411	304	L1
^{(6)} Tennessee Titans	10	6	0	.625	4–2	7–5	301	297	W3
Houston Texans	8	8	0	.500	1–5	5–7	379	384	W1

== Regular season ==
=== Week 1: at Jacksonville Jaguars ===
Quarter	1	2	3	4	Total
Titans	3	3	7	0	13
Jaguars	7	3	0	0	10

at Jacksonville Municipal Stadium, Jacksonville, Florida

- Game attendance: 65,437
- Referee: Bill Carollo
- TV announcers (CBS): Don Criqui (play-by-play) and Steve Beuerlein (color commentator)

The Titans began their season on the road against their division rival, the Jacksonville Jaguars. In the first quarter, Tennessee struck first with kicker Rob Bironas getting a 20-yard field goal. Afterwards, the Jaguars took the lead with QB David Garrard completing a 47-yard TD pass to WR John Broussard. In the second quarter, Jacksonville increased its lead with kicker Josh Scobee getting a 22-yard field goal. Afterwards, the Titans drew closer with Bironas kicking a 31-yard field goal. In the third quarter, Tennessee took the lead for good with QB Vince Young running into the end zone from 2 yards out for the final score of the game.

With the win, the Titans began the year at 1–0.

=== Week 2: vs. Indianapolis Colts ===
Quarter	1	2	3	4	Total
Colts	6	10	6	0	22
Titans	3	3	7	7	20

at LP Field, Nashville, Tennessee

- Game weather: 77 °F or 25 °C (Partly Cloudy)
- Game attendance: 69,143
- Referee: Walt Coleman
- TV announcers (CBS): Greg Gumbel (play-by-play) and Dan Dierdorf (color commentator)

The Titans and Colts met at LP Field on September 16. After a slow start from both offenses, the Colts struck first with an 8-yard run by Joseph Addai, but Colts kicker Adam Vinatieri missed the point after. With 1:03 left in the first quarter, the Titans scored with a 30-yard field goal by Rob Bironas. In the second quarter, the Colts scored another touchdown via a 22-yard touchdown pass from Peyton Manning to Dallas Clark. Both sides kicked another field goal in the quarter, and the Colts led 16–6 at the break. After the break, Adam Vinatieri made another field goal to extend the Colts' lead. Titans running back LenDale White scored a rushing touchdown, while Vinatieri's field goal attempt was tipped but bounced over the crossbar to end the third quarter. Vinatieri missed a 36-yard attempt early in the fourth quarter and Vince Young threw a 1-yard touchdown pass to Roydell Williams to end the game's scoring.

With the Titans' 22–20 loss, the team fell to 1–1 on the season.

=== Week 3: at New Orleans Saints ===
Quarter	1	2	3	4	Total
Titans	3	7	7	14	31
Saints	0	7	7	0	14

at Louisiana Superdome, New Orleans

- Game attendance: 70,002
- TV announcers (ESPN): Mike Tirico (play-by-play), Ron Jaworski, Tony Kornheiser (color commentators), & Michele Tafoya (sideline reporter)

Following their home loss from the Colts, the Titans flew to the Louisiana Superdome for a Monday Night fight with the New Orleans Saints. In the first quarter, Tennessee got the first punch with kicker Rob Bironas getting a 33-yard field goal for the only score of the period. In the second quarter, the Titans increased its lead with QB Vince Young completing a 35-yard TD pass to WR Brandon Jones. The Saints responded with RB Reggie Bush getting a 1-yard TD run.

In the third quarter, New Orleans took the lead with another 1-yard TD run by Bush. Tennessee regained the lead with RB LenDale White getting a 1-yard TD run. In the fourth quarter, the Titans closed out the game with Young completing a 3-yard TD pass to TE Bo Scaife, while DB Vincent Fuller returned an interception 61 yards for a touchdown. Pulling off the 3 other Saints interceptions was LB Keith Bulluck.

With the win, Tennessee entered its bye week at 2–1.

=== Week 5: vs. Atlanta Falcons ===
Quarter	1	2	3	4	Total
Falcons	7	3	3	0	13
Titans	7	3	10	0	20

at LP Field, Nashville, Tennessee

- Game weather: 88 °F or 31.1 °C (Sunny)
- Game attendance: 69,143
- TV announcers (Fox): Ron Pitts (play-by-play) and Tony Boselli (color commentator)

Coming off their bye week, the Titans were at home for a Week 5 interconference duel with the Atlanta Falcons. In the first quarter, Tennessee fell behind early as RB LenDale White fumbled, allowing Falcons CB DeAngelo Hall to return the ball 56 yards for a touchdown. Later, the Titans ties the game with RB Chris Brown getting a 3-yard TD run. In the second quarter, Atlanta went back into the lead with kicker Morten Andersen getting a 32-yard field goal. Tennessee ended the half with kicker Rob Bironas getting a 30-yard field goal.

In the third quarter, the Falcons regained the lead with Andersen kicking a 28-yard field goal. The Titans took the lead with kicker Rob Bironas nailing a 40-yard field goal, while DB Vincent Fuller intercepted Atlanta QB Joey Harrington and returned it 76 yards for a touchdown. In the fourth quarter, it was a defensive struggle. Even when the Falcons benched Harrington and put QB Byron Leftwich in, Tennessee managed to hold on and win, despite having 5 turnovers on the day.

With the win, not only did the Titans improve to 3–1, but it was also their 5th straight win over Atlanta. It also improved head coach Jeff Fisher's head coaching record against the NFC South to 13–1.

=== Week 6: at Tampa Bay Buccaneers ===
Quarter	1	2	3	4	Total
Titans	0	0	3	7	10
Buccaneers	0	3	7	3	13

at Raymond James Stadium, Tampa, Florida

- Game attendance: 65,347
- TV announcers (CBS): Greg Gumbel (play-by-play) and Dan Dierdorf (color commentator)

Coming off a home win over the Falcons, the Titans flew to Raymond James Stadium for a Week 6 interconference duel with the Tampa Bay Buccaneers. After a scoreless first quarter, Tennessee trailed as Buccaneers kicker Matt Bryant got a 23-yard field goal for the only score of the half. In the third quarter, the Titans responded with kicker Rob Bironas getting a 48-yard field goal. However, Tampa Bay answered with QB Jeff Garcia completing a 69-yard TD pass to WR Joey Galloway. In the fourth quarter, Tennessee tied the Buccaneers again with RB LenDale White getting a 2-yard TD run. Tampa Bay won the game as Bryant nailed a 43-yard field goal.

With the loss, not only did the Titans fall to 3–2, but QB Vince Young (11/14 for 120 yards and 1 interception) left the game in the third quarter with an injured right quadriceps.

Scoring summary
Q	Team	Time	Scoring play	Score
2	TB	6:07	Matt Bryant 23 Yard Field Goal	TB 3–0
3	TEN	7:52	Rob Bironas 48 Yard Field Goal	3–3
3	TB	2:29	Joey Galloway 69 Yard Pass From Jeff Garcia (Matt Bryant Kick)	TB 10–3
4	TEN	1:17	LenDale White 2 Yd Run (Rob Bironas Kick)	10–10
4	TB	0:11	Matt Bryant 43 Yard Field Goal	TB 13–10

=== Week 7: at Houston Texans ===
Quarter	1	2	3	4	Total
Titans	6	16	10	6	38
Texans	7	0	0	29	36

at Reliant Stadium, Houston, Texas

- Game attendance: 70,734
- Referee: Larry Nemmers
- TV announcers (CBS): Dick Enberg (play-by-play) and Randy Cross (color commentator)

Hoping to rebound from their road loss to the Buccaneers, the Titans flew to Reliant Stadium for a Week 7 AFC South showdown with the Houston Texans. With Vince Young recovering from a quad injury, back-up QB Kerry Collins was given the start. In the first quarter, Tennessee drew first blood with kicker Rob Bironas getting a 52-yard field goal. The Texans responded with LB DeMeco Ryans returning a fumble 26 yards for a touchdown. Afterwards, the Titans answered with Bironas kicking a 25-yard field goal. In the second quarter, Tennessee began to pound away as Bironas got a 21-yard field goal, while RB LenDale White got a 1-yard TD run. Afterwards, Bironas ended the half with 30-yard and 28-yard field goals.

In the third quarter, the Titans continued its domination with Bironas kicking a 43-yard field goal, while rookie RB Chris Henry got a 4-yard TD run. However, in the fourth quarter, Houston began to rally as QB Sage Rosenfels completed a 7-yard TD pass to WR David Anderson and a 6-yard TD pass to WR Kevin Walter. Afterwards, Tennessee managed to reply. With Bironas' 29-yard field goal, he became the 5th kicker in NFL history to get 7 field goals in one game. However, the Texans managed to retake the lead with Rosenfels completing a 7-yard TD pass to TE Jeb Putzier and a 53-yard TD pass to WR André Davis. The Titans managed to get a historic last-second field goal. With his 29-yard field goal, not only did it seal the win for Tennessee, but it made Rob Bironas the first kicker in NFL history to make 8 field goals in one game.

With the win, the Titans improved to 4–2.

=== Week 8: vs. Oakland Raiders ===
Quarter	1	2	3	4	Total
Raiders	3	6	0	0	9
Titans	3	0	7	3	13

at LP Field, Nashville, Tennessee

- Game weather: 63 °F or 17.2 °C (Partly Cloudy)
- Game attendance: 69,143
- TV announcers (CBS): Kevin Harlan (play-by-play) and Rich Gannon (color commentator)

Coming off their divisional road win over the Texans, the Titans returned home for a Week 8 intraconference duel with the Oakland Raiders. In the first quarter, Tennessee trailed early as Raiders kicker Sebastian Janikowski got a 50-yard field goal. The Titans tied the game with kicker Rob Bironas getting a 35-yard field goal. In the second quarter, Oakland retook the lead with Janikowski getting a 43-yard and a 54-yard field goal.

In the third quarter, Tennessee drew close with rookie RB Chris Henry getting a 24-yard TD run for the only score of the period. In the fourth quarter, the Titans took the lead for good as Bironas nailed a 23-yard field goal. Afterwards, Tennessee's defense held off the Raiders long enough for a touchdown.

With the win, the Titans improved to 5–2.

=== Week 9: vs. Carolina Panthers ===
Quarter	1	2	3	4	Total
Panthers	0	0	0	7	7
Titans	10	3	0	7	20

at LP Field, Nashville, Tennessee

- Game weather: 67 °F or 19.4 °C (Sunny)
- Game attendance: 69,143
- TV announcers (Fox): Dick Stockton (play-by-play) and Brian Baldinger (color commentator)

Coming off their home win over the Raiders, the Titans stayed at home for a Week 9 interconference duel against the Carolina Panthers. In the first quarter, Tennessee drew first blood as QB Vince Young got a 3-yard TD run, along with kicker Rob Bironas getting a 47-yard field goal. In the second quarter, the Titans increased their lead with Bironas kicking a 53-yard field goal for the only score of the period.

After a scoreless third quarter, Tennessee managed to put the game out of reach with RB LenDale White getting a 1-yard TD run. The Panthers avoided getting shut out as QB David Carr completed an 18-yard TD pass to WR Drew Carter.

With the win, not only did the Titans improve to 6–2, but Head Coach Jeff Fisher improved his record over the NFC South to 14–2.

Tennessee's defense had a good game as they sacked Carr 7 times and limited Carolina's offense to just 191 total yards.

=== Week 10: vs. Jacksonville Jaguars ===
Quarter	1	2	3	4	Total
Jaguars	7	7	7	7	28
Titans	0	3	3	7	13

at LP Field, Nashville, Tennessee

- Game weather: 64 °F or 17.8 °C (Cloudy)
- Game attendance: 69,143
- Referee: Ed Hochuli
- TV announcers (CBS): Kevin Harlan (play-by-play) and Rich Gannon (color commentator)

Coming off their home win over the Panthers, the Titans stayed at home for an AFC South rematch with the Jacksonville Jaguars. In the first quarter, Tennessee trailed early as Jaguars QB Quinn Gray completed a 2-yard TD pass to FB Greg Jones for the only score of the period. In the second quarter, the Titans continued to fall behind as RB Maurice Jones-Drew got an 8-yard TD run. Tennessee ended the half with kicker Rob Bironas getting a 37-yard field goal.

In the third quarter, Jacksonville increased its lead with RB Fred Taylor getting a 4-yard TD run. The Titans managed to get a 49-yard field goal from Bironas. In the fourth quarter, Tennessee drew close with QB Vince Young completing a 20-yard TD pass to WR Justin Gage. The Jaguars sealed the win with Gray completing a 3-yard TD pass to Jones.

With the loss, the Titans fell to 6–3.

Not only was Tennessee's rushing attack held to a season-low 62 yards, but their top-ranked rushing defense allowed its first 100-yard rusher of the year in Maurice Jones-Drew (19 attempts for 101 yards and 1 touchdown). This is largely in part due to DT Albert Haynesworth and DE Travis LaBoy being inactive due to injuries.

=== Week 11: at Denver Broncos ===
Quarter	1	2	3	4	Total
Titans	0	10	7	3	20
Broncos	14	6	7	7	34

at INVESCO Field at Mile High, Denver, Colorado

- Game time: 8:30 p.m. EST
- Game weather: 63 °F or 17.2 °C (Clear)
- Game attendance: 76,590
- Referee: Gerry Austin
- TV announcers (ESPN): Mike Tirico (play-by-play), Ron Jaworski, Tony Kornheiser (color commentators), & Michele Tafoya (sideline reporter)

Hoping to rebound from their divisional home loss to the Jaguars, the Titans flew to INVESCO Field at Mile High for a Week 11 Monday Night intraconference duel with the Denver Broncos. In the first quarter, Tennessee trailed early as Broncos QB Jay Cutler completed a 48-yard TD pass to WR Brandon Stokley, along with WR/PR Glenn Martinez returning a punt 80 yards for a touchdown. In the second quarter, the Titans got on the board with QB Vince Young completing a 21-yard TD pass to WR Brandon Jones. Denver responded with kicker Jason Elam getting a 21-yard and a 39-yard field goal. Tennessee ended the half with kicker Rob Bironas getting a 56-yard field goal.

In the third quarter, the Titans continue to trail as Cutler completed a 41-yard TD pass to WR Brandon Marshall. Tennessee replied with Young getting a 4-yard TD run. In the fourth quarter, the Titans tried to get a comeback as Bironas nailed a 37-yard field goal. The Broncos sealed the win with RB Andre Hall getting a 62-yard TD run.

With the loss, the Titans fell to 6–4.

=== Week 12: at Cincinnati Bengals ===
Quarter	1	2	3	4	Total
Titans	0	6	0	0	6
Bengals	7	7	14	7	35

at Paul Brown Stadium, Cincinnati

- Game time: 1:00 p.m. EST
- Game weather: 42 °F or 5.6 °C (Cloudy)
- Game attendance: 65,489
- Referee: John Parry
- TV announcers (CBS): Bill Macatee (play-by-play) & Steve Beuerlein (color commentator)

Trying to snap a two-game losing skid, the Titans flew to Paul Brown Stadium for a Week 12 duel with the Cincinnati Bengals. In the first quarter, Tennessee trailed early as Bengals RB Rudi Johnson got a 5-yard TD run for the only score of the period. In the second quarter, the Titans got on the board with kicker Rob Bironas getting a 28-yard field goal. However, Cincinnati answered with QB Carson Palmer completing a 10-yard TD pass to WR Chad Johnson. Tennessee ended the half with Bironas getting a 23-yard field goal.

In the second half, the Bengals sealed the win Carson and Chad hooking up with each other on a 2-yard TD pass in the third quarter and a 3-yard TD pass in the fourth quarter.

With their third-straight loss, the Titans fell to 6–5.

=== Week 13: vs. Houston Texans ===
Quarter	1	2	3	4	Total
Texans	7	3	0	10	20
Titans	7	0	14	7	28

at LP Field, Nashville, Tennessee

- Game time: 1:00 p.m. EST/12:00 p.m. CST
- Game weather: 61 °F or 16.1 °C (Cloudy)
- Game attendance: 69,143
- Referee: Jeff Triplette
- TV announcers (CBS): Kevin Harlan (play-by-play) and Rich Gannon (color commentator)

Trying to snap a three-game losing skid, the Titans went home for a Week 13 AFC South rematch with the Houston Texans. In the first quarter, Tennessee trailed early as Texans RB Ron Dayne got a 1-yard TD run. Afterwards, the Titans responded with RB LenDale White getting a 1-yard TD run. In the second quarter, Houston regained the lead with kicker Kris Brown getting a 45-yard field goal for the only score of the period.

In the third quarter, Tennessee took the lead as QB Vince Young completed a 43-yard TD pass to WR Roydell Williams, along with an 11-yard TD pass to WR Justin Gage. In the fourth quarter, the Texans crept closer with QB Sage Rosenfels completing a 28-yard TD pass to WR Andre Johnson. Afterwards, the Titans replied with RB Chris Brown getting a 7-yard TD run. Later, Houston managed to get a 50-yard field goal from Brown. Afterwards, Tennessee's defense help secure the guarantee of their three-game skid coming to an end.

With the season-sweeping win, the Titans improved to 7–5. This would prove the last season until 2020 in which the Titans swept the Texans.

=== Week 14: vs. San Diego Chargers ===
Quarter	1	2	3	4	OT	Total
Chargers	0	0	3	14	6	23
Titans	3	0	7	7	0	17

at LP Field, Nashville, Tennessee

- Game time: 1:00 p.m. EST/12:00 p.m. CST
- Game weather: 73 °F or 22.8 °C (Cloudy)
- Game attendance: 69,143
- Referee: Bill Carollo
- TV announcers (CBS): Greg Gumbel (play-by-play) and Dan Dierdorf (color commentator)

Coming off their divisional home win over the Texans, the Titans stayed at home for a Week 14 intraconference duel with the San Diego Chargers. In the first quarter, the Titans went on the attack first as kicker Rob Bironas managed to get a 44-yard field goal for the only score of the half.

In the third quarter, the Chargers tied the game with kicker Nate Kaeding getting a 20-yard field goal. Afterwards, Tennessee regained the lead with rookie RB Chris Brown getting a 7-yard TD run. In the fourth quarter, the Titans increased its lead with RB LenDale White getting a 7-yard TD run. However, San Diego tied the game with QB Philip Rivers completing a 7-yard TD pass to RB LaDainian Tomlinson and a 2-yard TD pass to TE Antonio Gates. In overtime, the Chargers sealed the win with Tomlinson getting a 16-yard TD run.

With the loss, Tennessee fell to 7–6.

The Titans have lost 4 out their last 5 games since starting the year at 6–2.

=== Week 15: at Kansas City Chiefs ===
Quarter	1	2	3	4	Total
Titans	7	3	10	6	26
Chiefs	0	14	3	0	17

at Arrowhead Stadium, Kansas City, Missouri

- Game time: 1:00 p.m. EST/12:00 p.m. CST
- Game weather: 22 °F or −5.6 °C (Clear)
- Game attendance: 74,976
- Referee: Bill Leavy
- TV announcers (CBS): Ian Eagle (play-by-play) and Solomon Wilcots (color commentator)

Hoping to rebound from their home loss to the Chargers, the Titans flew to Arrowhead Stadium for a Week 15 intraconference duel with the Kansas City Chiefs. In the first quarter, Tennessee drew first blood as QB Vince Young completed a 16-yard TD pass to WR Roydell Williams for the only score of the period. In the second quarter, the Chiefs tied the game with QB Brodie Croyle completing a 10-yard TD pass to WR Samie Parker. Afterwards, the Titans responded with kicker Rob Bironas managing to get a 37-yard field goal. Kansas City took the lead prior to halftime with Croyle completing a 9-yard TD pass to FB Kris Wilson.

In the third quarter, Tennessee drew close as Bironas kicked a 37-yard field goal. The Chiefs answered with kicker John Carney getting a 36-yard field goal. Afterwards, the Titans retook the lead with Young and Williams hooking up with each other again on a 41-yard TD pass. In the fourth quarter, Tennessee clinched the victory with Bironas nailing a 40-yard and a 25-yard field goal.

With the win, the Titans kept their playoff hopes alive at 8–6.

=== Week 16: vs. New York Jets ===
Quarter	1	2	3	4	Total
Jets	0	6	0	0	6
Titans	0	7	3	0	10

at LP Field, Nashville, Tennessee

- Game time: 4:15 p.m. EST/3:15 p.m. CST
- Game weather: 42 °F or 5.6 °C (Sunny)
- Game attendance: 69,143
- Referee: Terry McAulay
- TV announcers (CBS): Dick Enberg (play-by-play) & Randy Cross (color commentator)

Coming off their road win over the Chiefs, the Titans went home for a Week 16 duel with the New York Jets. After a scoreless first quarter, Tennessee got on the board first in the second quarter with RB Chris Brown getting a 4-yard TD run. The Jets responded with QB Chad Pennington completing a 9-yard TD pass to WR Jerricho Cotchery (with a failed PAT). In the third quarter, the Titans took the lead with kicker Rob Bironas nailing a 46-yard field goal. For the rest of the game, Tennessee's defense kept New York from being any kind of threat.

With the win (and a Cleveland loss), the Titans continued to keep their playoff hopes alive at 9–6.

RB LenDale White (23 attempts for 104 yards) got his first career 1,000-yard season.

=== Week 17: at Indianapolis Colts ===
Quarter	1	2	3	4	Total
Titans	7	0	3	6	16
Colts	0	3	7	0	10

at RCA Dome, Indianapolis

- Game time: 8:15 p.m. EST/7:15 p.m. CST
- Game weather: Game played indoors (Domed stadium)
- Game attendance: 57,202
- Referee: Ron Winter
- TV announcers (NBC): Al Michaels (play-by-play), John Madden (color commentator), & Andrea Kremer (sideline reporter)

Coming off their home win over the Jets, the Titans (needing a win to make the playoffs) flew to the RCA Dome for a Week 17 Sunday night AFC South rematch with the playoff-bound Indianapolis Colts. In the first quarter, Tennessee got the first punch as RB Chris Brown capped off the team's game-opening drive with an 8-yard TD run for the only score of the period. In the second quarter, the Colts got on the board with kicker Adam Vinatieri getting a 37-yard field goal for the only score of the period.

In the third quarter, Indianapolis took the lead with QB Jim Sorgi completing a 3-yard TD pass to WR Craphonso Thorpe. Afterwards, the Titans tied the game with kicker Rob Bironas getting a 40-yard field goal. In the fourth quarter, Tennessee sealed the deal with Bironas nailing a 54-yard and a 33-yard field goal.

With the win, not only did the Titans end the regular season at 10–6, but it also gave them the AFC's #6 seed.

== Playoffs ==
=== Schedule ===
Round	Date	Opponent (seed)	Result	Record	Venue	Recap
Wild Card	January 6	at San Diego Chargers (3)	L 17–6	0–1	Qualcomm Stadium	Recap

=== AFC Wild Card Playoff (Sunday January 6, 2008): at San Diego Chargers ===
Quarter	1	2	3	4	Total
Titans	3	3	0	0	6
Chargers	0	0	10	7	17

at Qualcomm Stadium, San Diego

- Game time: 4:15 PM EST
- Game weather: 39 °F or 3.9 °C (Light Rain)
- Game attendance: 65,640
- Referee: Ed Hochuli
- TV announcers (CBS): Jim Nantz (play by play) & Phil Simms (color commentator)

==== Game summary ====
Entering the playoffs as the AFC's #6 seed, the Titans began their Super Bowl run at Qualcomm Stadium against the third-seeded San Diego Chargers in a rematch of Week 14, which saw Tennessee lead early, yet lose in overtime.

In the first half, the Titans got the early lead as kicker Rob Bironas kicked a 30-yard field goal in the first quarter and a 44-yard field goal in the second quarter. In the third quarter, the Chargers took the lead with kicker Nate Kaeding nailing a 20-yard field goal, along with QB Philip Rivers completing a 25-yard TD pass to WR Vincent Jackson. In the fourth quarter, San Diego sealed the win with RB LaDainian Tomlinson getting a 1-yard TD run.

With the loss, Tennessee ended its season with an overall record of 10–7.

QB Vince Young entered this game as the youngest quarterback to ever start a playoff game in franchise history (24 years and 233 days) until Marcus Mariota played in a 2017 Wild Card (24 years and 68 days).
