= Charleston Swamp Foxes =

Arena football team in South Carolina, US

Logo

General information
- Founded: 1999
- Folded: 2003
- Headquartered: North Charleston Coliseum in North Charleston, South Carolina
- Colors: Royal blue, gold, white

Team history
- Charleston Swamp Foxes (2000–2003)

Home fields
- North Charleston Coliseum (2000–2003)

League / conference affiliations
- af2 (2000–2003): American Conference (2000–2003); Eastern Division (2001); Southern Division (2002); Atlantic Division (2003)

The Charleston Swamp Foxes were one of the 15 original teams to join the inaugural 2000 AF2 season. They started off in the American Conference, before switching divisions in every year of their existence (2001-Northeast, 2002-Southern & 2003-Atlantic). Charleston played their home games in the North Charleston Coliseum. After the 2003 season, the Swamp Foxes folded, and arena football in Charleston, South Carolina was absent until the 2006 formation of the Charleston/Carolina Sandsharks. The Charleston franchise was named after Francis Marion, also known as "The Swamp Fox".

== Season-by-season ==
ArenaCup Champions	ArenaCup Appearances	Division champions	Playoff berth

Season	League	Conference	Division	Regular season			Postseason results
Season	League	Conference	Division	Finish	Wins	Losses	Postseason results
Charleston Swamp Foxes
2000	AF2	American		6th	4	12	
2001	AF2	American	Eastern	5th	7	9	
2002	AF2	American	Southern	4th	7	9	
2003	AF2	American	Atlantic	3rd	9	7	
Total					27	37	

== Notable players ==
- Rob Bironas - Tennessee Titans kicker
