= Rob Bironas =

American football player (1978–2014)

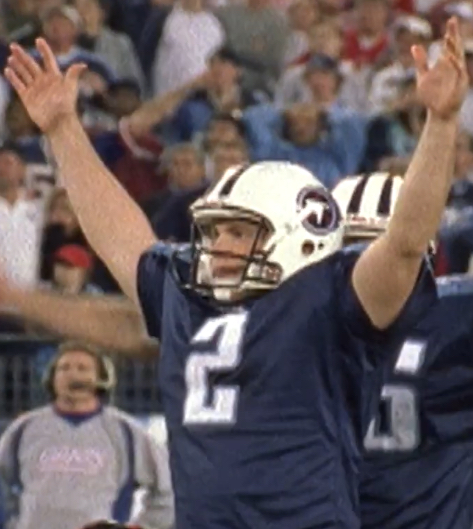
- Bironas with the Tennessee Titans in 2006

No. 2
- Position: Placekicker

Personal information
- Born: January 29, 1978; Louisville, Kentucky, U.S.
- Died: September 20, 2014 (aged 36); Nashville, Tennessee, U.S.
- Listed height: 6 ft 0 in (1.83 m)
- Listed weight: 210 lb (95 kg)

Career information
- High school: Trinity (St. Matthews, Kentucky)
- College: Auburn (1997–1999); Georgia Southern (2000)
- NFL draft: 2001: undrafted

Career history
- Green Bay Packers (2002)*; Charleston Swamp Foxes (2003); Tampa Bay Buccaneers (2003)*; Carolina Cobras (2004); Pittsburgh Steelers (2004)*; New York Dragons (2005); Tennessee Titans (2005–2013)
- * Offseason or practice squad member only

Awards and highlights
- First-team All-Pro (2007); Pro Bowl (2007); PFW Golden Toe Award (2007); NFL records: Most field goals made in a game: 8; Most points scored in a game, no touchdowns: 26

Career NFL statistics
- Field goals: 239
- Field goal attempts: 279
- Field goal %: 85.6
- Longest field goal: 60
- Stats at Pro Football Reference

James Robert Douglas Bironas (January 29, 1978 – September 20, 2014) was an American professional football player who was a placekicker for the Tennessee Titans of the National Football League (NFL). He played college football for the Auburn Tigers and Georgia Southern Eagles.

He was originally signed by the Green Bay Packers as an undrafted free agent in 2002. Bironas' active professional career began in Arena football where he was a member of the Charleston Swamp Foxes, Carolina Cobras, and the New York Dragons and had intermittent offseason stints with the NFL's Tampa Bay Buccaneers and the Pittsburgh Steelers. In 2005, he signed with the Titans, with whom he played for nine seasons and was an All-Pro and Pro Bowl selection in 2007. Bironas was killed in a car crash on September 20, 2014.

== Early life ==
Bironas attended Trinity High School in Louisville, Kentucky, and was a four-year varsity letterman in soccer, a two-year varsity letterman in football and swimming, and added a one-year letterman in track and field. He graduated in 1996.

== College career ==
Bironas attended Auburn University, where he played for the Auburn Tigers football team from 1997 to 1999. He was a semi-finalist for the Lou Groza Award in 1998 after making 12 of 16 field goal attempts (including two successful 49-yard (45 m) tries with the four misses from 40+) and making all 18 PATs for a team-high 54 points. The following season, new head coach Tommy Tuberville replaced Bironas, the preseason All-SEC kicker of the football team, with the punter, Damon Duval. Bironas later transferred to Georgia Southern University, where his brother was on the soccer team, for his final year of collegiate eligibility, and played for the Georgia Southern Eagles football team. Bironas won the 2000 NCAA Division I-AA National Championship while playing with the Eagles, before returning to graduate from Auburn with a bachelor's degree in marketing.

== Professional career ==
=== Early career and arena football (2001–2004) ===
Bironas signed with the Green Bay Packers in 2002 as an undrafted free agent, before being released before the season began. Bironas then began playing in the Arena Football League's minor league system (af2), where he spent the 2003 season with the Charleston Swamp Foxes, making 12 of 27 field goal attempts that season. During the 2003 NFL offseason, he signed with the Tampa Bay Buccaneers, and was again released before the season began. In 2004, he moved up to the Arena Football League with the Carolina Cobras converting 17 of 40 field goal attempts and 70 of 89 extra point tries. In 2004, he returned to the NFL and signed with the Pittsburgh Steelers, with whom his stint was again no longer than a preseason. He therefore returned to arena football, spending the 2005 season with the New York Dragons before signing with the Titans, connecting on 7 of 16 field goal attempts and 99 of 117 extra point attempts for the AFL's New York Dragons.

=== Tennessee Titans (2005–2013) ===
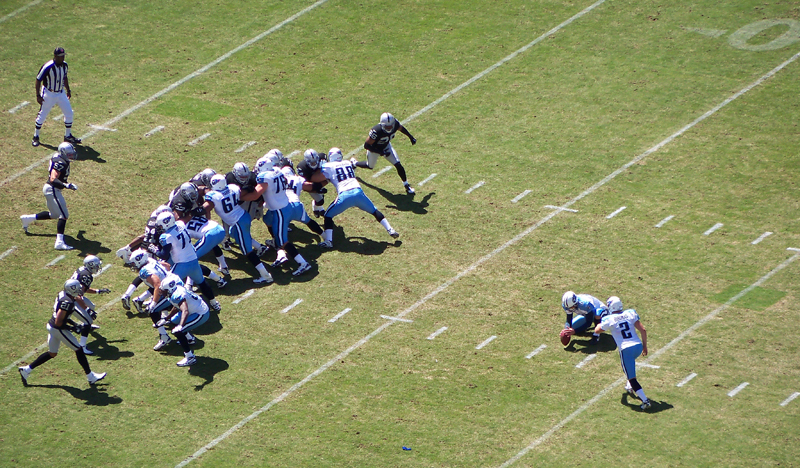
Bironas attempts a field goal during the 2010 season against the Oakland Raiders

In 2005, Bironas signed as an unrestricted free agent with the Tennessee Titans, where he finished his first season with the Titans converting 23 of 29 field goals attempts (79.3%) and 30 of 32 extra points attempts (93.8%). Bironas finished the season with 11 touchbacks, which tied him for fourth in the AFC and seventh in the NFL.

In 2006, Bironas built on his previous success and kicked four game winning field goals, including one of 60 yards against the Indianapolis Colts, which tied as the eighth-longest in NFL history.

In 2007, Bironas was named the AFC Player of the Month for the month of October. He made 13 of 14 field goals (92.9 percent) and all six PATs as he helped the Titans earn a 3-1 (.750) record for the month. He accounted for 45 of the team's 81 points in October. In the Titans' three wins in October, Bironas connected on 12 of 13 field goals, including an NFL-record eight field goals in one game (52, 25, 21, 30, 28, 43, 29, and 29 yards). This record effort also included the game-winning kick against the Houston Texans at Reliant Stadium on October 21. In the same game, he tied the existing record of five field goals made in a single half. Bironas was selected to the NFL's All-Pro Team and the Pro Bowl.

On February 28, 2008, the Titans tendered Bironas to a one-year, $1.417 million contract as a restricted free agent. He signed his tender on May 9, 2008.

On February 18, 2009, the Titans re-signed Bironas to a four-year $12 million contract with $5 million guaranteed.

The Titans and Bironas agreed to a two-year contract extension on March 7, 2013, worth $6.7 million.

The Titans released Bironas on March 19, 2014.

== NFL career statistics ==
=== Field goals ===
Year	Team	GP	Field goals								Extra points			Total points
Year	Team	GP	FGM	FGA	FG%	20−29	30−39	40−49	50+	Lng	XPM	XPA	XP%	Total points
2005	TEN	16	23	29	79.3	10−10	6−7	5−7	2−5	53	30	32	93.8	99
2006	TEN	16	22	28	78.6	10−11	7−7	4−8	1−2	60	32	32	100.0	98
2007	TEN	16	35	39	89.7	10−12	12−12	9−10	4−5	56	28	28	100.0	133
2008	TEN	16	29	33	87.9	6−6	7−7	15−19	1−1	51	40	40	100.0	127
2009	TEN	16	27	32	84.4	8−8	4−6	10−12	5−6	53	37	37	100.0	118
2010	TEN	16	24	26	92.3	6−6	8−9	8−8	2−3	55	38	38	100.0	110
2011	TEN	16	29	32	90.6	5−5	9−10	9−10	6−7	53	34	34	100.0	121
2012	TEN	16	25	31	80.6	6−6	13−13	5−10	1−2	53	35	35	100.0	110
2013	TEN	16	25	29	86.2	10−10	8−9	5−7	2−3	55	41	41	100.0	116
Career		144	239	279	85.7	71−74	74−80	70−91	24−34	60	315	317	99.4	1,032

=== Kickoffs ===
Year	Team	GP	Kickoffs								
Year	Team	GP	KO	Yds	Avg	TB	Ret	Avg	TD	OSK	OSKR
2005	TEN	16	71	4,557	64.2	11	57	22.6	0	2	0
2006	TEN	16	70	4,356	62.2	10	57	22.1	0	1	0
2007	TEN	16	75	5,071	67.6	16	58	24.2	0	0	0
2008	TEN	16	85	5,708	67.2	22	61	25.0	0	1	1
2009	TEN	16	81	5,199	64.2	7	71	24.1	1	2	1
2010	TEN	16	76	5,071	66.7	17	56	24.8	1	1	1
2011	TEN	16	78	4,991	64.0	44	30	22.7	0	2	1
2012	TEN	16	74	4,725	63.9	37	33	26.1	1	3	0
2013	TEN	16	80	4,891	61.1	32	42	24.8	0	5	1
Career		144	690	44,569	64.6	196	465	24.0	3	17	5

=== Records and honors ===
- AFC Special Teams Player of the Week – 2006 (Week 13), 2007 (Week 7)
- AFC Special Teams Player of the Month – October 2007
- Most NFL game-winning field goals in a season – 2005 (4; tied, most recently, Josh Brown)
- Most field goals in a game – October 21, 2007 at Houston Texans (8)
- Most points by a kicker in a game – October 21, 2007 at Houston Texans (26)
- Second-most points scored in a game in franchise history – October 21, 2007 at Houston Texans (26; first place – Billy Cannon (30))
- Most field goals in a half – October 21, 2007 at Houston Texans (5; tied with Morten Andersen, Chris Boniol, Mike Nugent)
- 2008 Pro Bowl selection
- Led Tennessee Titans in scoring in both 2005 and 2006
- Second place on franchise's all-time scoring list
- Second place on franchise's all-time field goal list
- Selected to All-Pro Team in 2007 and 2008
- Most consecutive games with a 40+ yard field goal in NFL history – 10

== Charitable work ==
Bironas founded The Rob Bironas Fund in 2008. The Nashville-based nonprofit is part of the Community Foundation of Middle Tennessee, and works to give Nashville youth ways to engage with and be educated by area musicians. The fund finances tools, education and leadership to help Nashville youth achieve scholastic excellence through music education. The fund has partnered with both the Nashville Symphony and Country Music Hall of Fame.

Bironas was a board member of the Nashville Symphony, and worked to provide help to needy children through the Kicks for Kids program. He was also a member of Phi Kappa Tau fraternity, where he contributed to charity and philanthropy.

== Personal life ==
In June 2014, Bironas married Rachel Bradshaw, daughter of former NFL and Hall of Fame quarterback Terry Bradshaw. Bironas was of Lithuanian descent. His son London committed to Stanford Cardinal football in 2025.

== Death ==
On September 20, 2014, at approximately 11 p.m., Bironas was killed in a car crash. He lost control of his 2009 Yukon Denali and swerved off the road, flipped several times, hit several trees, and finally landed upside down in a ditch. He was transported to Vanderbilt University Medical Center but was pronounced dead on arrival. Witnesses said that Bironas had been driving aggressively prior to the crash. Toxicology reports released 11 days later revealed that Bironas' blood alcohol level had been 0.218 percent, almost three times the legal limit of 0.08 in the state of Tennessee. Autopsy reports showed Bironas died from blunt force trauma as a result of crashing the car.
