= 2007 NFL season =

American football season

Regular season
- Duration: September 6 – December 30, 2007

Playoffs
- Start date: January 5, 2008
- AFC Champions: New England Patriots
- NFC Champions: New York Giants

Super Bowl XLII
- Date: February 3, 2008
- Site: University of Phoenix Stadium, Glendale, Arizona
- Champions: New York Giants

Pro Bowl
- Date: February 10, 2008
- Site: Aloha Stadium

AFC teams: West, North, South, East
NFC teams: West, North, South, East

The 2007 NFL season was the 88th regular season of the National Football League (NFL).

Regular-season play was held from September 6 to December 30. The campaign kicked off with the defending Super Bowl XLI champion Indianapolis Colts defeating the New Orleans Saints in the NFL Kickoff Game.

The New England Patriots became the first team to complete the regular season undefeated since the league expanded to a 16-game regular season in 1978. Four weeks after the playoffs began on January 5, 2008, the Patriots' bid for a perfect season was dashed when they lost to the New York Giants 17–14 in Super Bowl XLII, the league championship game at University of Phoenix Stadium in Glendale, Arizona, on February 3.

For the first time, two divisions (the NFC East and the AFC South) had no team finish with a losing record. (Note: Since 1935 this had previously occurred only with the 1989 AFC Central, the 1995 AFC West, the 1999 AFC East and the 2002 AFC East, but had since occurred with the 2008 NFC South, the 2008 NFC East and the 2022 NFC East. In 2023, the AFC North would surpass this by having all teams finish with a winning record.)

== Draft ==
The 2007 NFL draft was held from April 28 to 29, 2007, at New York City's Radio City Music Hall. With the first pick, the Oakland Raiders selected quarterback JaMarcus Russell from Louisiana State University.

== New referee ==
John Parry was promoted to referee, replacing Bill Vinovich, who was forced to resign due to a heart condition. Vinovich would then serve as a replay official from 2007 to 2011. He would later be given a clean bill of health and return to the field as a referee in 2012.

== Notable retirements ==
- Marshall Faulk
- Curtis Martin
- Drew Bledsoe
- Will Shields
- Jake Plummer
- Adam Timmerman
- Kevin Mathis
- Kris Mangum
- Aaron Brooks
- Jeff Hartings
- Terrence Murphy
- Bob Whitfield
- Priest Holmes (After week 11)
- Tiki Barber
- Mike Bartrum
- Mike Vanderjagt
- Antonio Freeman
- Jessie Armstead
- Jerome Woods
- Tarik Glenn
- Eric Beverly
- Vinny Testaverde

== Rule changes ==
The following rule changes were passed at the league's annual owners meeting in Phoenix, Arizona, during the week of March 25–28:

- The instant replay system, used since the 1999 season, was finally made a permanent officiating tool. Previously, it was renewed on a biennial basis.
- The system has also been upgraded to use high-definition technology. However, the systems at Texas Stadium (Dallas Cowboys), RCA Dome (Indianapolis Colts), and Giants Stadium (New York Giants and Jets) did not receive the HDTV updates since those stadiums were scheduled to be (and since have been) replaced in the forthcoming years. One reason that the technology was improved was that fans with high-definition televisions at home were having better views on replays than the officials and according to Dean Blandino, the NFL's instant replay director "that could have bit us in the rear if we continued [with the old system]." In addition, the amount of time allotted for the referee to review a play was reduced from 90 seconds to one minute.
- After a play is over, players who spike the ball in the field of play, other than in the end zone, will receive a 5-yard delay of game penalty.
- Forward passes that unintentionally hit an offensive lineman before an eligible receiver will no longer be an illegal touching penalty, but deliberate actions are still penalized.
- Roughing-the-passer penalties will not be called on a defender engaged with a quarterback who simply extends his arms and shoves the passer to the ground.
- During situations where crowd noise becomes too loud that it prevents the offensive team from hearing its signals, the offense can no longer ask the referee to reset the play clock.
- It is necessary to have the ball touch the pylon or break the plane above the pylon to count as a touchdown. Previously, a player just had to have some portion of his body over the goal line or pylon to count a touchdown.
- A completed catch is now when a receiver gets two feet down and has control of the ball. Previously, a receiver had to make "a football move" in addition to having control of the ball for a reception.
- Players will be subject to a fine from the league for playing with an unbuckled chin strap. Officials will not penalize for chin strap violations during a game.

== Preseason ==
The Hall of Fame Game was played in Canton, Ohio, on Sunday August 5, 2007, with the Pittsburgh Steelers defeating the Saints by a score of 20–7; the game was televised by the NFL Network, replacing NBC, who had been previously scheduled to broadcast the China Bowl exhibition game from Beijing, China on August 8, 2007, between the New England Patriots and the Seattle Seahawks at Workers Stadium. However, with all efforts being put into the London regular season game, plans for the game were postponed (then later cancelled completely) as Beijing hosted the 2008 Summer Olympics.

== Regular season ==
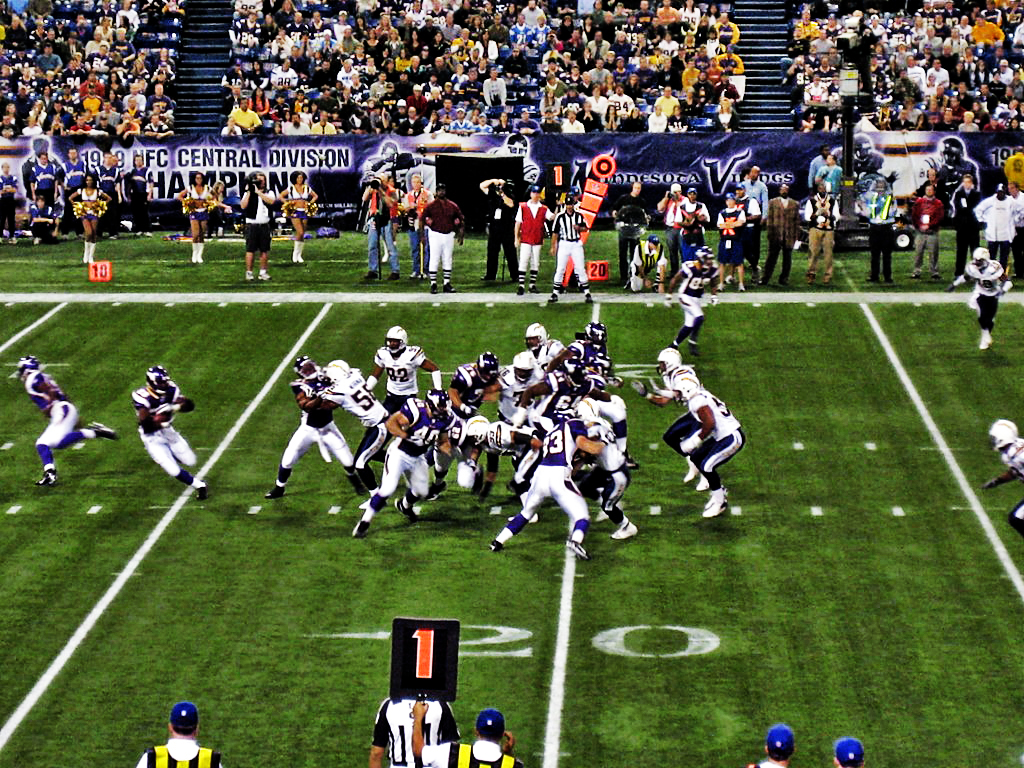
Adrian Peterson of Minnesota rushes against San Diego in week 9, on his way to a record 296 rushing yards in a game

=== Schedule formula ===
Based on the NFL's scheduling formula, the intraconference and interconference matchups for 2007 were:

Intraconference

- AFC East vs. AFC North
- AFC West vs. AFC South
- NFC East vs. NFC North
- NFC West vs. NFC South

Interconference

- AFC East vs. NFC East
- AFC North vs. NFC West
- AFC South vs. NFC South
- AFC West vs. NFC North

=== Opening weekend ===
On March 26, 2007, the league announced the opening Saints–Colts Kickoff Game on September 6 that would be telecast on NBC. Pre-game activities featured Indiana native John Mellencamp, Billy Joel, and Kelly Clarkson. The entertainment portion of events started 30 minutes earlier than the scheduled start time of the game, leading up to the unveiling of the Colts' Super Bowl XLI championship banner. The opening events were simulcast on NFL Network.

The Dallas Cowboys hosted the New York Giants in the first Sunday night game September 9 at 8:15 p.m. US EDT. Monday Night Football on ESPN kicked off with a doubleheader on September 10 with the Cincinnati Bengals hosting the Baltimore Ravens at 7:00 p.m. US EDT, and the San Francisco 49ers hosting the Arizona Cardinals at 10:15 p.m. US EDT. The 49ers paid tribute to three-time Super Bowl winning head coach Bill Walsh, who died July 30, in that game.

=== Going global ===
In October 2006, NFL club owners approved a plan to stage up to two international regular season games per season beginning in 2007 and continuing through at least 2011. On February 2, 2007, the league announced that the Week 8 contest between the New York Giants and the Miami Dolphins would be played at Wembley Stadium in London on October 28 at 5 p.m. GMT, which was 1 p.m. EDT. As the Giants were the away-team designate from the NFC, Fox broadcast the game in the United States according to league broadcast contract rules.

=== "Super Bowl 41 1/2" ===
In Week 9, the New England Patriots (8–0) faced the Indianapolis Colts (7–0) in a battle of undefeated teams. Thus there was a lot of hype surrounding the game, also due to the fact that these teams had met in the previous season's AFC Championship game, and would possibly meet later in the 2007 AFC Championship game. Many people dubbed the game "Super Bowl 41 1/2". The Patriots prevailed 24–20, and would finish the regular season as the league's first 16–0 team.

=== Thanksgiving ===
For the second year in a row, three games were held on the United States' Thanksgiving Day (November 22). In addition to the traditional games hosted by the Detroit Lions and Cowboys (with those teams respectively playing the Green Bay Packers and the New York Jets, with the Packers–Lions game starting at 12:30 p.m. US EST and the Jets–Cowboys game kicking off at 4:15 p.m. US EST respectively), the Colts faced the Atlanta Falcons in the Georgia Dome, with kickoff at 8:15 p.m. US EST.

=== Flex scheduling ===
The NFL entered its second year of flexible scheduling in the final weeks of the season. In each of the Sunday night contests from Weeks 11 through 17, NBC had the option of switching its Sunday night game for a more favorable contest, up to 12 days before the game's start.

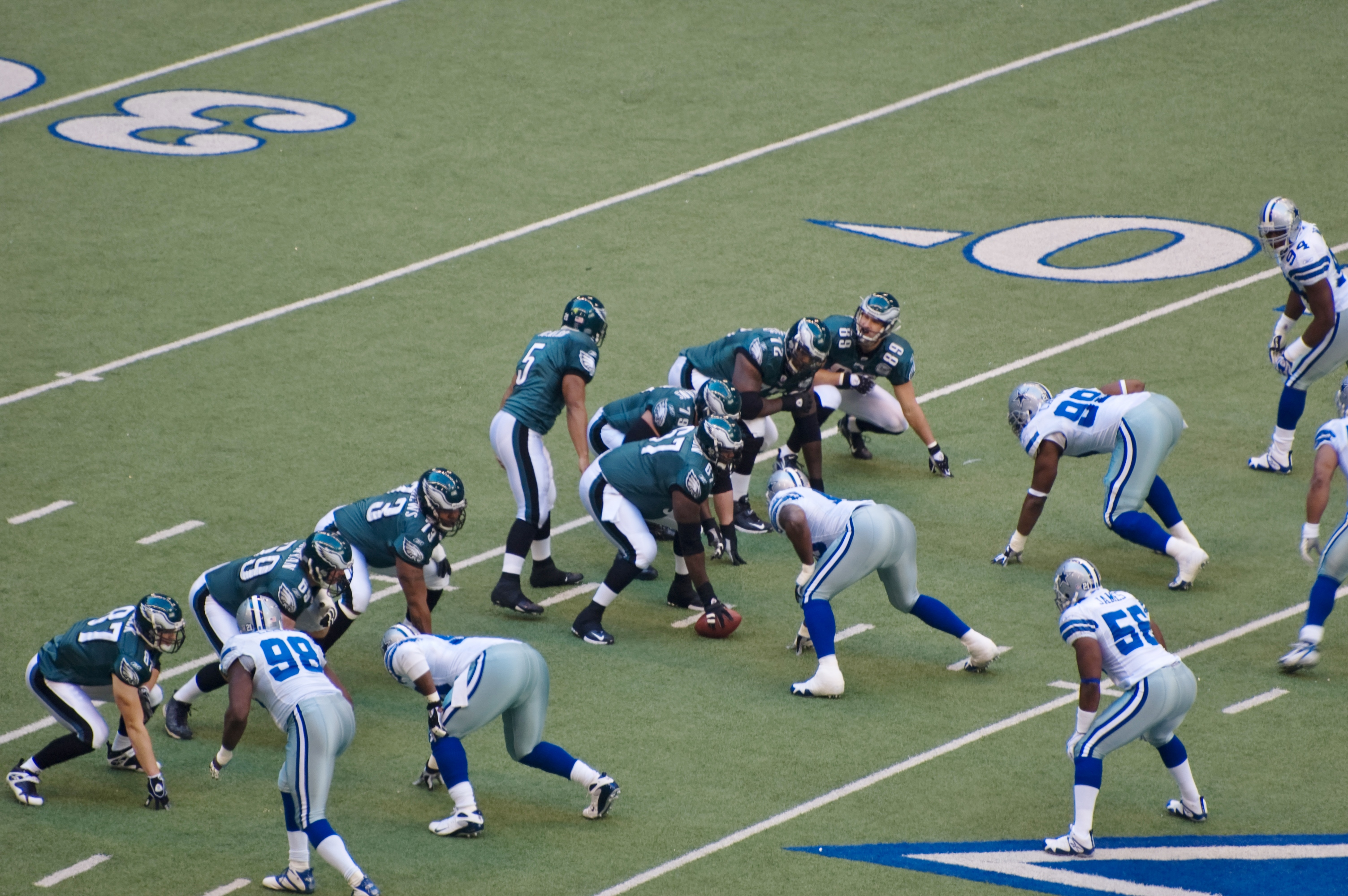
Philadelphia playing at Dallas on December 16 – Donovan McNabb calls a play to Matt Schobel

In addition to an extra week of flexible scheduling (because of the conflict with scheduling Christmas Eve the previous season, which NBC did not do (instead opting to air a game on Christmas Day), the NFL slightly changed its flex-schedule procedure. In 2006, the league did not reveal its predetermined Sunday night game; the reason given by the league was to avoid embarrassing the teams switched out for a more compelling game. In 2007, the league announced all predetermined matchups, with a footnote on the games subject to flex scheduling. Also, the network that carries the "doubleheader" week game (either CBS or Fox) will be able to switch one game per week into the 4:15 pm (US ET) time slot, except in the final week, when NBC will select one game for the 8:15 pm slot, and both CBS and Fox will have doubleheader games on December 30.

Week 11:

- The New England–Buffalo game, originally scheduled for 1:00 p.m. ET on CBS, was flexed into NBC Sunday Night Football at 8:15 p.m. ET, replacing the Chicago–Seattle game, which was moved to 4:15 p.m. ET on Fox.
- The New York Giants–Detroit game, originally scheduled for 4:15 p.m. ET, was flexed to 1:00 p.m. ET on Fox.
- The Pittsburgh–New York Jets game, originally scheduled for 1:00 p.m. ET, was flexed to 4:05 p.m. ET on CBS.
- The Washington–Dallas game, originally scheduled for 1:00 p.m. ET, was flexed to 4:15 p.m. ET on Fox.

Week 12: The Denver–Chicago game, originally scheduled for 1:00 p.m. ET, was flexed to 4:15 p.m. ET on CBS.

Week 13: The Tampa Bay–New Orleans game, originally scheduled for 1:00 p.m. ET, was flexed to 4:15 p.m. ET on Fox.

Week 14: The Pittsburgh–New England game, originally scheduled for 1:00 p.m. ET, was flexed to 4:15 p.m. ET on CBS.

Week 16:

- The Washington–Minnesota game, originally scheduled for 1:00 p.m. ET on Fox, was flexed into NBC Sunday Night Football at 8:15 p.m. ET, replacing the Tampa Bay–San Francisco game, which was moved to 4:05 p.m. ET on Fox.
- The Miami–New England game, originally scheduled for 1:00 p.m. ET, was flexed to 4:15 p.m. ET on CBS.

Week 17:

- The Tennessee–Indianapolis game, originally scheduled for 1:00 p.m. ET on CBS, was flexed into NBC Sunday Night Football at 8:15 p.m. ET, replacing the Kansas City–New York Jets game, which was moved to 4:15 p.m. ET on CBS.
- The Pittsburgh–Baltimore game, originally scheduled for 1:00 p.m. ET, was flexed to 4:15 p.m. ET on CBS.
- The Dallas–Washington game, originally scheduled for 1:00 p.m. ET, was flexed to 4:15 p.m. ET on Fox.

== Regular season standings ==
=== Division ===
AFC East
	W	L	T	PCT	DIV	CONF	PF	PA	STK
^{(1)} New England Patriots	16	0	0	1.000	6–0	12–0	589	274	W16
Buffalo Bills	7	9	0	.438	4–2	6–6	252	354	L3
New York Jets	4	12	0	.250	2–4	4–8	268	355	W1
Miami Dolphins	1	15	0	.063	0–6	1–11	267	437	L2

AFC North
	W	L	T	PCT	DIV	CONF	PF	PA	STK
^{(4)} Pittsburgh Steelers	10	6	0	.625	5–1	7–5	393	269	L1
Cleveland Browns	10	6	0	.625	3–3	7–5	402	382	W1
Cincinnati Bengals	7	9	0	.438	3–3	6–6	380	385	W2
Baltimore Ravens	5	11	0	.313	1–5	2–10	275	384	W1

AFC South
	W	L	T	PCT	DIV	CONF	PF	PA	STK
^{(2)} Indianapolis Colts	13	3	0	.813	5–1	9–3	450	262	L1
^{(5)} Jacksonville Jaguars	11	5	0	.688	2–4	8–4	411	304	L1
^{(6)} Tennessee Titans	10	6	0	.625	4–2	7–5	301	297	W3
Houston Texans	8	8	0	.500	1–5	5–7	379	384	W1

AFC West
	W	L	T	PCT	DIV	CONF	PF	PA	STK
^{(3)} San Diego Chargers	11	5	0	.688	5–1	9–3	412	284	W6
Denver Broncos	7	9	0	.438	3–3	6–6	320	409	W1
Kansas City Chiefs	4	12	0	.250	2–4	3–9	226	335	L9
Oakland Raiders	4	12	0	.250	2–4	4–8	283	398	L4

NFC East
	W	L	T	PCT	DIV	CONF	PF	PA	STK
^{(1)} Dallas Cowboys	13	3	0	.813	4–2	10–2	455	325	L1
^{(5)} New York Giants	10	6	0	.625	3–3	7–5	373	351	L1
^{(6)} Washington Redskins	9	7	0	.563	3–3	7–5	334	310	W4
Philadelphia Eagles	8	8	0	.500	2–4	5–7	336	300	W3

NFC North
	W	L	T	PCT	DIV	CONF	PF	PA	STK
^{(2)} Green Bay Packers	13	3	0	.813	4–2	9–3	435	291	W1
Minnesota Vikings	8	8	0	.500	3–3	6–6	365	311	L2
Detroit Lions	7	9	0	.438	3–3	4–8	346	444	L1
Chicago Bears	7	9	0	.438	2–4	4–8	334	348	W2

NFC South
	W	L	T	PCT	DIV	CONF	PF	PA	STK
^{(4)} Tampa Bay Buccaneers	9	7	0	.563	5–1	8–4	334	270	L2
Carolina Panthers	7	9	0	.438	3–3	7–5	267	347	W1
New Orleans Saints	7	9	0	.438	3–3	6–6	379	388	L2
Atlanta Falcons	4	12	0	.250	1–5	3–9	259	414	W1

NFC West
	W	L	T	PCT	DIV	CONF	PF	PA	STK
^{(3)} Seattle Seahawks	10	6	0	.625	5–1	8–4	393	291	L1
Arizona Cardinals	8	8	0	.500	3–3	5–7	404	399	W2
San Francisco 49ers	5	11	0	.313	3–3	4–8	219	364	L1
St. Louis Rams	3	13	0	.188	1–5	3–9	263	438	L4

=== Conference ===
AFC
#	Team	Division	W	L	T	PCT	DIV	CONF	SOS	SOV	STK
Division leaders
1	New England Patriots	East	16	0	0	1.000	6–0	12–0	.469	.469	W16
2	Indianapolis Colts	South	13	3	0	.813	5–1	9–3	.516	.457	L1
3	San Diego Chargers	West	11	5	0	.688	5–1	9–3	.531	.477	W6
4 (Note: Pittsburgh finished ahead of Cleveland based on head-to-head sweep.)	Pittsburgh Steelers	North	10	6	0	.625	5–1	7–5	.453	.531	L1
Wild cards
5	Jacksonville Jaguars	South	11	5	0	.688	2–4	8–4	.516	.460	L1
6 (Note: Tennessee finished ahead of Cleveland based on win percentage in common games (4–1 vs. 3–2 against: Cincinnati, Houston, NY Jets, and Oakland).)	Tennessee Titans	South	10	6	0	.625	4–2	7–5	.500	.438	W3
Did not qualify for the postseason
7	Cleveland Browns	North	10	6	0	.625	3–3	7–5	.430	.344	W1
8	Houston Texans	South	8	8	0	.500	1–5	5–7	.516	.391	W1
9 (Note: Denver finished ahead of Buffalo and Cincinnati based on strength of victory.)	Denver Broncos	West	7	9	0	.438	3–3	6–6	.516	.420	W1
10 (Note: Buffalo finished ahead of Cincinnati based on head-to-head victory.)	Buffalo Bills	East	7	9	0	.438	4–2	6–6	.516	.277	L3
11	Cincinnati Bengals	North	7	9	0	.438	3–3	6–6	.461	.339	W2
12	Baltimore Ravens	North	5	11	0	.313	1–5	2–10	.516	.375	W1
13 (Note: New York finished ahead of Kansas City based on head-to-head victory. Division tie break was initially used to eliminate Oakland (see below).)	New York Jets	East	4	12	0	.250	2–4	4–8	.523	.250	W1
14 (Note: Kansas City finished ahead of Oakland based on win percentage in common games (2–11 vs. 1–12 against: Houston, Chicago, Minnesota, San Diego, Jacksonville, Green Bay, Denver, Indianapolis, Tennessee, and Detroit).)	Kansas City Chiefs	West	4	12	0	.250	2–4	3–9	.516	.469	L9
15	Oakland Raiders	West	4	12	0	.250	2–4	4–8	.516	.344	L4
16	Miami Dolphins	East	1	15	0	.063	0–6	1–11	.539	.313	L2
Tiebreakers (Note: When breaking ties for three or more teams under the NFL's rules, they are first broken within divisions, then comparing only the highest ranked remaining team from each division.)

NFC
#	Team	Division	W	L	T	PCT	DIV	CONF	SOS	SOV	STK
Division leaders
1 (Note: Dallas finished ahead of Green Bay based on head-to-head victory.)	Dallas Cowboys	East	13	3	0	.813	4–2	10–2	.496	.452	L1
2	Green Bay Packers	North	13	3	0	.813	4–2	9–3	.469	.452	L1
3	Seattle Seahawks	West	10	6	0	.625	5–1	8–4	.414	.375	L1
4	Tampa Bay Buccaneers	South	9	7	0	.563	5–1	8–4	.469	.410	L2
Wild cards
5	New York Giants	East	10	6	0	.625	3–3	7–5	.516	.375	L1
6	Washington Redskins	East	9	7	0	.563	3–3	7–5	.555	.458	W4
Did not qualify for the postseason
7 (Note: Minnesota finished ahead of Philadelphia and Arizona based on conference record.)	Minnesota Vikings	North	8	8	0	.500	3–3	6–6	.504	.430	L2
8 (Note: Philadelphia finished ahead of Arizona based on win percentage in common games (3–2 vs. Arizona’s 2–3 against: Washington, Detroit, Seattle, and New Orleans).)	Philadelphia Eagles	East	8	8	0	.500	2–4	5–7	.563	.438	W3
9	Arizona Cardinals	West	8	8	0	.500	3–3	5–7	.434	.422	W2
10 (Note: Carolina finished ahead of Detroit based on conference record. Division tie break was initially used to eliminate New Orleans (see below).) (Note: Carolina finished ahead of New Orleans based on a better conference record.)	Carolina Panthers	South	7	9	0	.438	3–3	7–5	.523	.411	W1
11 (Note: New Orleans finished ahead of Detroit based on conference record. Division tie break was initially used to eliminate Chicago (see below).)	New Orleans Saints	South	7	9	0	.438	3–3	6–6	.492	.438	L2
12 (Note: Detroit finished ahead of Chicago based on head-to-head sweep.)	Detroit Lions	North	7	9	0	.438	3–3	4–8	.543	.411	L1
13	Chicago Bears	North	7	9	0	.438	2–4	4–8	.513	.500	W2
14	San Francisco 49ers	West	5	11	0	.313	3–3	4–8	.457	.438	L1
15	Atlanta Falcons	South	4	12	0	.250	1–5	3–9	.516	.469	W1
16	St. Louis Rams	West	3	13	0	.188	1–5	3–9	.512	.333	L4
Tiebreakers (Note: When breaking ties for three or more teams under the NFL's rules, they are first broken within divisions, then comparing only the highest-ranked remaining team from each division.)

== Playoffs ==
Within each conference, the four division winners and the top two non-division winners with the best overall regular season records) qualified for the playoffs. The four division winners are seeded 1–4 based on their overall won-lost-tied record, and the wild card teams are seeded 5–6. The NFL does not use a fixed bracket playoff system, and there are no restrictions regarding teams from the same division matching up in any round. In the first round, dubbed the wild-card playoffs or wild-card weekend, the third-seeded division winner hosts the sixth-seed wild card, and the fourth seed hosts the fifth. The 1 and 2 seeds from each conference received a first-round bye. In the second round, the divisional playoffs, the number 1 seed hosts the worst-surviving seed from the first round (seed 4, 5, or 6), while the number 2 seed will play the other team (seed 3, 4, or 5). The two surviving teams from each conference's divisional playoff games met in the respective AFC and NFC Conference Championship games, hosted by the higher seed. Although the Super Bowl, the championship round of the playoffs, is played at a neutral site, the designated home team is based on an annual rotation by conference.

Playoff seeds
Seed	AFC	NFC
1	New England Patriots (East winner)	Dallas Cowboys (East winner)
2	Indianapolis Colts (South winner)	Green Bay Packers (North winner)
3	San Diego Chargers (West winner)	Seattle Seahawks (West winner)
4	Pittsburgh Steelers (North winner)	Tampa Bay Buccaneers (South winner)
5	Jacksonville Jaguars (wild card)	New York Giants (wild card)
6	Tennessee Titans (wild card)	Washington Redskins (wild card)

=== Bracket ===
Jan 6 – Raymond James Stadium	Jan 13 – Texas Stadium
5	NY Giants	24
5	NY Giants	21
4	Tampa Bay	14	Jan 20 – Lambeau Field
1	Dallas	17
NFC
Jan 5 – Qwest Field	5	NY Giants	23*
Jan 12 – Lambeau Field
2	Green Bay	20
6	Washington	14	NFC Championship
3	Seattle	20
3	Seattle	35	Feb 3 – University of Phoenix Stadium
2	Green Bay	42
Wild-card round
Divisional round
Jan 6 – Qualcomm Stadium	N5	NY Giants	17
Jan 13 – RCA Dome
A1	New England	14
6	Tennessee	6	Super Bowl XLII
3	San Diego	28
3	San Diego	17	Jan 20 – Gillette Stadium
2	Indianapolis	24
AFC
Jan 5 – Heinz Field	3	San Diego	12
Jan 12 – Gillette Stadium
1	New England	21
5	Jacksonville	31	AFC Championship
5	Jacksonville	20
4	Pittsburgh	29
1	New England	31

* Indicates overtime victory

== Deaths ==
=== Pro Football Hall of Fame members ===
Jim Ringo
Ringo played 16 seasons in the NFL as a center with the Green Bay Packers and Philadelphia Eagles, and was inducted into the Hall of Fame in 1981. He was a 10-time Pro Bowler, 9-time All-Pro selection, and 2-time NFL Champion. He died on November 19, age 75.

=== Active personnel ===
- Marquise Hill, New England Patriots defensive end, died on May 28, at the age of 24, drowned.
- Sean Taylor, Washington Redskins safety, died November 27 at the age of 24, homicide. Posthumously named to 2008 Pro Bowl.

== Events ==
=== Player conduct off the field ===
The NFLPA, then led by their president Gene Upshaw and NFL commissioner Roger Goodell, worked with player conduct in the form of suspensions for off the field conduct in light of the more than fifty arrests by local law enforcement since the start of the 2006 season. The hardest hit came on April 10 when Adam "Pacman" Jones of the Tennessee Titans was suspended for the entire season for his five arrests, the most blatant while in Las Vegas for the NBA All-Star Weekend in February where he was accused of causing a riot/shooting in a strip club. That same day, Chris Henry of the Cincinnati Bengals was suspended for the first eight games of the season for his run-ins with the legal system. The other big name that has been caught in the web of controversy was Falcons' quarterback Michael Vick. Vick was charged on July 24, 2007, with dogfighting and animal abuse, and was suspended following a guilty plea in the case, on which he was sentenced to 23 months in prison (retroactive to November) and three years probation on December 10.

=== Spygate ===
During the Patriots season opening game at The Meadowlands against the Jets, a Patriots camera staffer was ejected from the Patriots sideline and was accused of videotaping the Jets' defensive coaches relaying signals. The end result was that the team was fined $250,000, head coach Bill Belichick was docked $500,000 (the maximum fine that could be imposed) and also stripped of their first round selection of the 2008 NFL draft. If the Patriots had failed to make the playoffs, the penalty would have been their second and third round picks. The team was allowed to keep their other first-round pick acquired from the San Francisco 49ers during the previous year's selection meeting.

=== Other events ===
- The NFL set an all-time attendance record in 2007, with the league's 31 stadiums attracting 17,345,205 paying customers during the regular season. Average per-game attendance was 67,755.
- The ESPN Monday Night Football game between the unbeaten New England Patriots and the Baltimore Ravens on December 3 drew the highest basic cable rating in history, with over 17.5 million viewers, beating the premiere of Disney Channel's High School Musical 2, which set the previous record on August 17. The previous high-water mark was a MNF telecast between the New York Giants and Dallas Cowboys on October 23, 2006, which drew over 16 million viewers.

== Milestones ==
The following teams and players set all-time NFL records during the regular season:

Record	Player/team	Date broken/opponent	Previous record holder
Longest kickoff return	Ellis Hobbs, New England (108 yards)^{[a]}	September 9, at N.Y. Jets	Tied by 3 players (106)
Most regular-season wins by a quarterback, career	Brett Favre, Green Bay (160)	September 16, at N.Y. Giants	John Elway, 1983–1998 (148)
Most touchdown passes, career	Brett Favre, Green Bay (442)	September 30, at Minnesota	Dan Marino, 1983–1999 (420)
Most pass attempts, career	Brett Favre, Green Bay (8,758)	September 30, at Minnesota	Dan Marino, 1983–1999 (8,358)
Most Points Scored by a Team, Fourth quarter	Detroit Lions (34)	September 30, vs. Chicago	Tied by 3 teams (31)
Most consecutive games with a 20-point margin of victory, to start season	New England Patriots (4)	October 1, vs. Cincinnati	1920 Buffalo All-Americans (4, including semi-pro teams)
Most touchdown catches by a tight end, career	Tony Gonzalez, Kansas City (66)	October 14, vs. Cincinnati	Shannon Sharpe, 1990–2003 (62)
Most passes had intercepted, career	Brett Favre, Green Bay (288)	October 14, vs. Washington	George Blanda, 1949–1975 (277)
Most field goals, game	Rob Bironas, Tennessee (8)	October 21, at Houston	Tied by 4 players (7)
Most consecutive seasons in one stadium	Lambeau Field, Green Bay Packers	2007 marks 51st season.	Wrigley Field, Chicago Bears (50 years, 1921–1970)
Longest return of a missed field goal/ longest play in NFL history	Antonio Cromartie, San Diego (109 yards)	November 4, at Minnesota	Tied by 3 players (108 yards)^{[a]}
Most rushing yards, game	Adrian Peterson, Minnesota (296)	November 4, vs. San Diego	Jamal Lewis, 2003 (295)
Most consecutive games with three touchdown passes	Tom Brady, New England (10 games)	November 4, at Indianapolis	Peyton Manning (8 games)
Most games with Three Touchdown Passes, career	Brett Favre, Green Bay (63)	November 22, at Detroit	Dan Marino, 1983–1999 (62)
Most Yards Passing, career	Brett Favre, Green Bay (61,655)	December 16, at St. Louis	Dan Marino, 1983–1999 (61,361)
Consecutive 12+ win seasons	2003–2010 Indianapolis (5)	December 16, at Oakland	1992–1995 Dallas (4)
Most touchdowns scored, season	New England Patriots (75)	December 23, vs. Miami	Miami Dolphins, 1984 (69)
Most Points After Touchdown Kicked, season/ Most Point After Touchdown Attempts, season	Stephen Gostkowski, New England (74/74)	December 16, vs. N.Y. Jets/ December 23, vs. Miami	Uwe von Schamann, 1984 (66 PATs) / Uwe von Schamann, 1984 (70 attempts)
Most Points, season	New England Patriots (589)	December 29, at N.Y. Giants	Minnesota, 1998 (556)
Most touchdown passes, season	Tom Brady, New England (50)	December 29, at N.Y. Giants	Peyton Manning, Indianapolis, 2004 (49)
Most receiving touchdowns, season	Randy Moss, New England (23)	December 29, at N.Y. Giants	Jerry Rice, San Francisco, 1987 (22)
Most Points After Touchdown, No Misses, season	Stephen Gostkowski, New England (74/74)	December 29, at N.Y. Giants	Jeff Wilkins, St. Louis, 1999 (64/64)
Most Games Won, season	New England (16)	December 29, at N.Y. Giants	Tied by 4 teams (15)
Most consecutive games won, Start of Season/ Most consecutive games Without Defeat, Start of Season	New England (16)	December 29, at N.Y. Giants	Miami, 1972 (14)
Most consecutive games won, End of Season/ Most consecutive games Without Defeat, End of Season	New England (16)	December 29, at N.Y. Giants	Tied by 2 teams (14)
Most consecutive regular-season games won	New England, 2006–07 (19)	December 29, at N.Y. Giants	New England, 2003–04 (18)
Most kick returns for a touchdown, season	Devin Hester, Chicago (6: 4 punts and 2 kickoffs)	December 30, vs. New Orleans	Devin Hester, 2006 (5: 3 punts and 2 kickoffs)
Most passes completed, season	Drew Brees, New Orleans (443)	December 30, at Chicago	Rich Gannon, Oakland, 2002 (418)
Most Receptions by a Tight End, career	Tony Gonzalez, Kansas City (816)	December 30, at N.Y. Jets	Shannon Sharpe, 1990–2003 (815)

^{a} Hobbs' kickoff return was also, at the time, tied for the longest play in NFL history until Antonio Cromartie broke the record.

== Regular season statistical leaders ==
Team
Points scored	New England Patriots (589)
Total yards gained	New England Patriots (6,580)
Yards rushing	Minnesota Vikings (2,634)
Yards passing	New England Patriots (4,731)
Fewest points allowed	Indianapolis Colts (262)
Fewest total yards allowed	Pittsburgh Steelers (4,262)
Fewest rushing yards allowed	Minnesota Vikings (1,185)
Fewest passing yards allowed	Tampa Bay Buccaneers (2,728)
Individual
Scoring	Mason Crosby, Green Bay (141 points)
Touchdowns	Randy Moss, New England (23 TDs)
Most field goals made	Rob Bironas, Tennessee (35 FGs)
Rushing yards	LaDainian Tomlinson, San Diego (1,474 yards)
Rushing touchdowns	LaDainian Tomlinson, San Diego (15 TDs)
Passer rating	Tom Brady, New England (117.2 rating)
Passing touchdowns	Tom Brady, New England (50 TDs)
Passing yards	Tom Brady, New England (4,806 yards)
Receptions	T. J. Houshmandzadeh, Cincinnati and Wes Welker, New England (112 catches)
Receiving yards	Reggie Wayne, Indianapolis (1,510 yards)
Receiving touchdowns	Randy Moss, New England (23 TDs)
Punt returns	Devin Hester, Chicago (42 for 651 yards, 15.5 average yards)
Kickoff returns	Josh Cribbs, Cleveland (59 for 1,809 yards, 30.7 average yards)
Tackles	Patrick Willis, San Francisco (136)
Interceptions	Antonio Cromartie, San Diego (10)
Punting	Shane Lechler, Oakland (73 for 3,585 yards, 49.1 average yards)
Sacks	Jared Allen, Kansas City (15.5)

== Awards ==
Most Valuable Player	Tom Brady, New England Patriots
Coach of the Year	Bill Belichick, New England Patriots
Offensive Player of the Year	Tom Brady, New England Patriots
Defensive Player of the Year	Bob Sanders, safety, Indianapolis Colts
Offensive Rookie of the Year	Adrian Peterson, running back, Minnesota Vikings
Defensive Rookie of the Year	Patrick Willis, linebacker, San Francisco 49ers
NFL Comeback Player of the Year	Greg Ellis, Dallas Cowboys
Walter Payton NFL Man of the Year	Jason Taylor, defensive end, Miami Dolphins
Super Bowl Most Valuable Player Award	Eli Manning, quarterback, New York Giants

All-Pro Team

Offense
Quarterback	Tom Brady, New England; Brett Favre, Green Bay
Running back	LaDainian Tomlinson, San Diego; Brian Westbrook, Philadelphia
Fullback	Lorenzo Neal, San Diego
Wide receiver	Randy Moss, New England; Terrell Owens, Dallas
Tight end	Jason Witten, Dallas
Offensive tackle	Matt Light, New England; Walter Jones, Seattle
Offensive guard	Steve Hutchinson, Minnesota; Alan Faneca, Pittsburgh
Center	Jeff Saturday, Indianapolis

Defense
Defensive end	Patrick Kerney, Seattle; Jared Allen, Kansas City
Defensive tackle	Albert Haynesworth, Tennessee; Kevin Williams, Minnesota
Outside linebacker	Mike Vrabel, New England; DeMarcus Ware, Dallas
Inside linebacker	Lofa Tatupu, Seattle; Patrick Willis, San Francisco
Cornerback	Asante Samuel, New England; Antonio Cromartie, San Diego
Safety	Bob Sanders, Indianapolis; Ed Reed, Baltimore

Special teams
Kicker	Rob Bironas, Tennessee
Punter	Andy Lee, San Francisco
Kick returner	Devin Hester, Chicago

=== Team superlatives ===
==== Offense ====
- Most points scored: New England, 589
- Fewest points scored: San Francisco, 219
- Most total offensive yards: New England, 6,580
- Fewest total offensive yards: San Francisco, 3,797
- Most total passing yards: New England, 4,731
- Fewest total passing yards: San Francisco, 2,320
- Most rushing yards: Minnesota, 2,634
- Fewest rushing yards: Kansas City, 1,248

==== Defense ====
- Fewest points allowed: Indianapolis, 262
- Most points allowed: Detroit, 444
- Fewest total yards allowed: Pittsburgh, 4,262
- Most total yards allowed: Detroit, 6,042
- Fewest passing yards allowed: Tampa Bay, 2,725
- Most passing yards allowed: Minnesota, 4,225
- Fewest rushing yards allowed: Minnesota, 1,185
- Most rushing yards allowed: Miami, 2,456

Week/ Month	Offensive Player of the Week/Month		Defensive Player of the Week/Month		Special Teams Player of the Week/Month	
Week/ Month	AFC	NFC	AFC	NFC	AFC	NFC
1	Chris Brown (Titans)	Tony Romo (Cowboys)	Mario Williams (Texans)	Dewayne White (Lions)	Ellis Hobbs (Patriots)	Mason Crosby (Packers)
2	Derek Anderson (Browns)	Brett Favre (Packers)	Bob Sanders (Colts)	Barrett Ruud (Buccaneers)	Jason Elam (Broncos)	Devin Hester (Bears)
3	Tom Brady (Patriots)	Brian Westbrook (Eagles)	Keith Bulluck (Titans)	Anthony Henry (Cowboys)	Yamon Figurs (Ravens)	Lance Laury (Seahawks)
4	Daunte Culpepper (Raiders)	Brett Favre (Packers)	Jabari Greer (Bills)	Osi Umenyiora (Giants)	Dave Rayner (Chiefs)	Steve Breaston (Cardinals)
5	Philip Rivers (Chargers)	Jason Campbell (Redskins)	Ike Taylor (Steelers)	Roderick Hood (Cardinals)	Kris Brown (Texans)	Nick Folk (Cowboys)
6	Tom Brady (Patriots)	Adrian Peterson (Vikings)	Paul Spicer (Jaguars)	Charles Woodson (Packers)	Matt Stover (Ravens)	Devin Hester (Bears)
7	Tom Brady (Patriots)	Brian Griese (Bears)	Dwight Freeney (Colts)	Osi Umenyiora (Giants)	Rob Bironas (Titans)	Nate Burleson (Seahawks)
8	Joseph Addai (Colts)	Drew Brees (Saints)	Mike Vrabel (Patriots)	Trent Cole (Eagles)	Mike Scifres (Chargers)	Jason Hanson (Lions)
9	Randy Moss (Patriots)	Adrian Peterson (Vikings)	James Harrison (Steelers)	Shaun Rogers (Lions)	Antonio Cromartie (Chargers)	Shaun Suisham (Redskins)
10	Ben Roethlisberger (Steelers)	Marc Bulger (Rams)	Antonio Cromartie (Chargers)	Karlos Dansby (Cardinals)	Darren Sproles (Chargers)	Morten Anderson (Falcons)
11	Randy Moss (Patriots)	Terrell Owens (Cowboys)	Shaun Ellis (Jets)	Antrel Rolle (Cardinals)	Glenn Martinez (Broncos)	Tramon Williams (Packers)
12	Chad Johnson (Bengals)	Frank Gore (49ers)	Asante Samuel (Patriots)	Dwight Smith (Vikings)	Josh Scobee (Jaguars)	Devin Hester (Bears)
13	Peyton Manning (Colts)	Tony Romo (Cowboys)	Shawne Merriman (Chargers)	Lofa Tatupu (Seahawks)	Rian Lindell (Bills)	Aundrae Allison (Vikings)

== Head coach/front office changes ==
=== Head coach ===
Offseason

The following teams hired new head coaches prior to the start of the 2007 season:

Team	2007 Coach	Former Coach	Reason for leaving	Notes
Atlanta Falcons	Bobby Petrino, former head coach, University of Louisville	Jim Mora	Fired	Hired in 2004 and subsequently led the Falcons to the NFC Championship Game. However, Atlanta went 8–8 in 2005 before going 7–9 in 2006, losing their final three games.
Arizona Cardinals	Ken Whisenhunt, former offensive coordinator, Pittsburgh Steelers	Dennis Green	Fired	Hired in 2004. However, the Cardinals suffered three consecutive losing seasons under him, including a loss to the Chicago Bears after blowing a 20-point lead that prompted Green to throw an infamous tirade during the post-game media conference saying, "They are who we thought they were, and we let em' off the hook!"
Dallas Cowboys	Wade Phillips, former defensive coordinator, San Diego Chargers	Bill Parcells	Retired	Hired in 2003. Led the Cowboys to the playoffs in two of his four seasons as Dallas head coach.
Miami Dolphins	Cam Cameron, former offensive coordinator, San Diego Chargers	Nick Saban	Resigned to coach the University of Alabama	Hired in 2005 and finished the year 9–7, narrowly missing the playoffs. Went 6–10 in 2006, first losing record as a head coach.
Oakland Raiders	Lane Kiffin, former offensive coordinator, Southern California	Art Shell	Fired	Re-hired in 2006 after having previously served as Raiders head coach, 1989–94. However, in his only season back, the team finished with its worst record, 2–14, since 1963.
Pittsburgh Steelers	Mike Tomlin, former defensive coordinator, Minnesota Vikings	Bill Cowher	Resigned	Hired in 1992 and led the Steelers to an appearance in Super Bowl XXX and a victory in Super Bowl XL, resigning and eventually retiring to become an analyst for the NFL on CBS.
San Diego Chargers	Norv Turner, former offensive coordinator, San Francisco 49ers	Marty Schottenheimer	Fired	Hired in 2002. Led the Chargers to two playoff appearances, but a strained relationship with general manager A.J. Smith led to his ousting.

In-season

The following head coaches were fired or resigned during the 2007 season:

Team	Coach at start of the season	Interim coach	Reason for leaving	Notes
Atlanta Falcons	Bobby Petrino	Emmitt Thomas	Resigned	Petrino resigned after going 3–10 to take job at University of Arkansas; Thomas took over and went 1–2 as interim coach.

=== Front office ===
Offseason

Team	Position	2006 office holder	Reason for leaving	2007 replacement	Notes
New York Giants	GM	Ernie Accorsi	Retired	Jerry Reese	Jerry Reese succeeded Accorsi as general manager on January 16, 2007. He was the director of player personnel for the Giants from 2002 until he became general manager.
Tennessee Titans	GM	Floyd Reese	Resigned	Mike Reinfeldt	Floyd Reese resigned (was forced out) following disputes with owner Bud Adams and coach Jeff Fisher about the direction of the team. He had been general manager since 1994, when the franchise was still the Houston Oilers.

== Stadiums ==
The 2007 season was the last in the RCA Dome for the Indianapolis Colts, who had played there since 1984. The franchise moved to the new Lucas Oil Stadium in time for the 2008 season, located directly across the street. The dome would be demolished, and an extension to the Indiana Convention Center would replace the stadium.

Alltel Stadium reverts to Jacksonville Municipal Stadium after Alltel declines to renew the naming rights of the Jacksonville Jaguars's home.

== Uniforms and patches ==
- This was the last season in which the classic NFL Shield logo, which had not changed since 1980, was used. An updated version first seen on August 31 in USA Today was put into use starting with the 2008 NFL draft in April. The new logo design features eight stars (one for each division) instead of the current 25 stars, the football now resembles that on the top of the Vince Lombardi Trophy, given to the Super Bowl champion and the lettering and point has been updated and modified to that of the league's current typeface for other logos.
- Teams that have permanent captains are allowed to wear a "C" patch (similar to those in ice hockey) on their right shoulder. The patch is in team colors with four stars under the "C." A gold star is placed on a bar below the "C" signaling how many years (with a maximum of four years) that player has been captain. The Pittsburgh Steelers—who were using up two patches as it was for the season with their own logo (which was already part of the standard uniforms) and the team's 75th anniversary logo—and Oakland Raiders elected not to use the "C" patch.
- The San Diego Chargers introduced new uniforms featuring white helmets, navy face masks, and revamped gold lightning bolts. A powder blue third jersey was also introduced.
- San Francisco 49ers coach Mike Nolan and Jaguars coach Jack Del Rio each wore suits on the sidelines for all of the teams' home games to honor Nolan's father, former 49ers and Saints coach Dick Nolan. In 2006, both coaches were allowed to wear a suit on the sidelines for a maximum of two home games. Del Rio did not wear a suit in the September 16 game against the Falcons due to the extreme heat in Jacksonville that day. Nolan wore a suit at the Meadowlands against the Giants on October 21.
- The Washington Redskins celebrated their 75th anniversary season (the franchise having been founded in 1932 as the Boston Braves), and wore Vince Lombardi-styled uniforms against the New York Giants on September 23. The Philadelphia Eagles and their cross-state rival Pittsburgh Steelers also celebrated their respective 75th seasons, having been founded in 1933. The Eagles wore replicas of their inaugural season uniforms against the Detroit Lions on September 23, while the Steelers wore 1960 uniforms against the Buffalo Bills on September 16 and did so again when the Baltimore Ravens visited on November 5.
- Throwback uniforms were not just limited to team anniversary celebrations. The Cleveland Browns wore their 1957 throwbacks in a game against the Houston Texans on November 25, the Minnesota Vikings wore 1970s uniforms against the Green Bay Packers on September 30 (in the same game that Brett Favre passed Dan Marino for most touchdown passes in NFL history), while the Jets honored their historic predecessors on October 14 against the Eagles and, in a rare instance, wore them in a road game at Miami December 2 by wearing the New York Titans' 1960 through 1962 uniforms. The team did not become the Jets until 1963. The Cowboys wore their 1960 uniforms on November 29 against the Packers, and the Bills wore their 1960s throwbacks at home against Dallas October 7 and against Miami December 9.
- The 49ers also honored the late Bill Walsh, coach of their wins in Super Bowls XVI, XIX, and XXIII by wearing throwback uniforms from the 1980s in their opener on September 10 against the Arizona Cardinals. Mike Nolan had been considering wearing the 1980s uniforms for the entire season to honor Walsh's memory. The retro uniforms were worn again on November 18 against the Seahawks. In addition, all season long, the team wore a black football-shaped decal on their helmets with the initials "BW" in white.
- The Kansas City Chiefs honored their late former owner and team founder Lamar Hunt by wearing special American Football League logo patches on their jerseys with the letters "LH" emblazoned inside the logo's football. Originally meant to be a one-season tribute, the Chiefs announced that as of the 2008 NFL season, the patch will be a permanent fixture on the jerseys, joining the Chicago Bears (for George Halas) and Cleveland Browns (for Al Lerner) for such memorial patches.

== Television ==
The 2007 season marked the second year under the league's television contracts with its American broadcast partners. CBS and Fox primarily televised Sunday afternoon AFC and NFC away games, respectively. NBC broadcast Sunday Night Football, ESPN aired Monday Night Football, and NFL Network held the rights to Thursday Night Football.

The pre-game shows made some changes, with former Steelers coach Bill Cowher joining host James Brown, Boomer Esiason, Shannon Sharpe and Dan Marino on CBS' The NFL Today. On Fox, after one season on the road, Fox NFL Sunday returned to Los Angeles as Curt Menefee took over as full-time host. Chris Rose, who had been doing in-game updates of other NFL games, was reverted to a part-time play-by-play role.

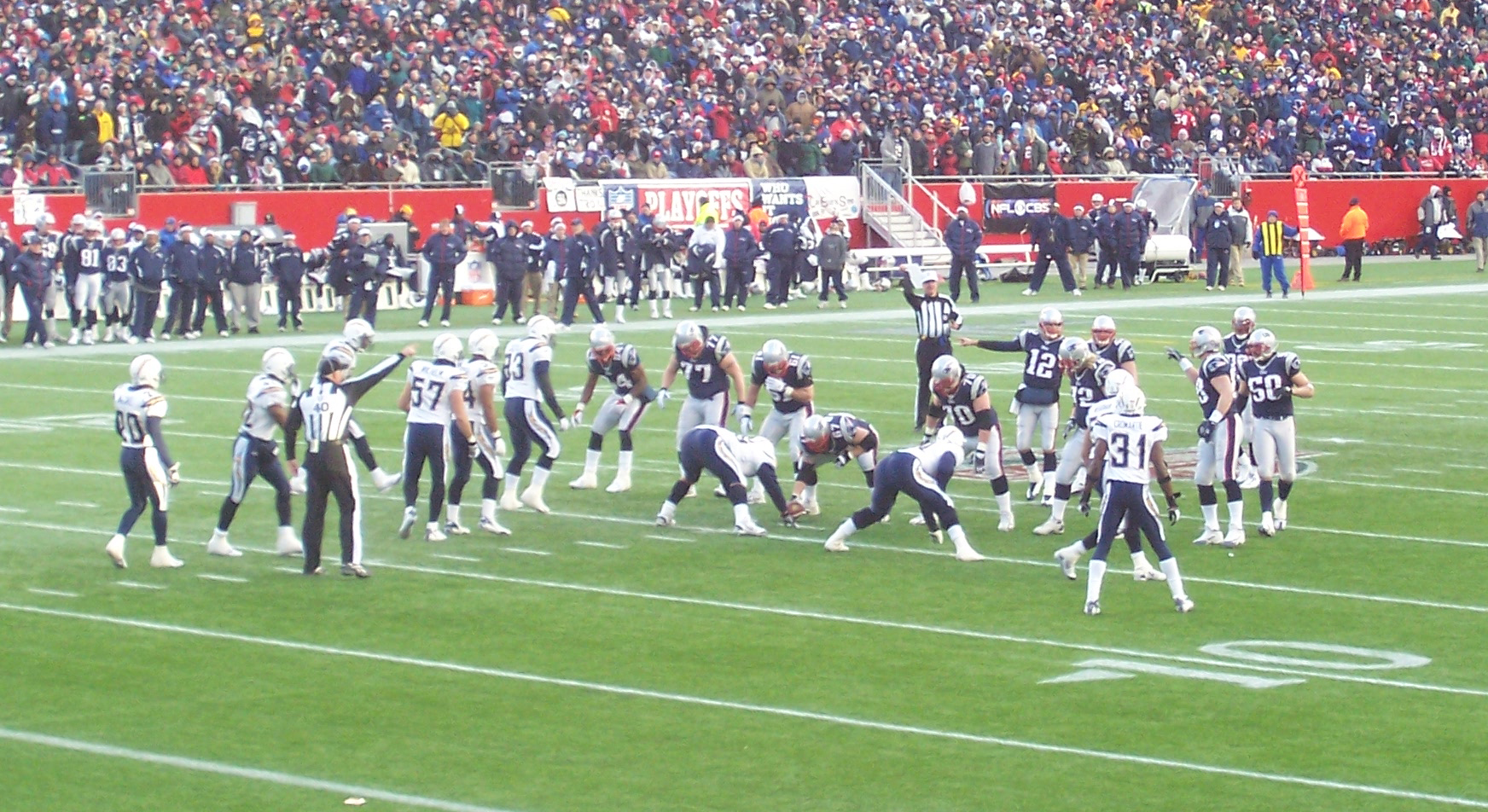
New England takes on San Diego in the AFC Championship Game

The biggest changes were at NBC and ESPN. Michael Irvin's contract with ESPN was not renewed, and former coach Bill Parcells returned to the network after four years as Cowboys head coach. Parcells left before the season ended to become the Miami Dolphins VP of Player Personnel. Another pair of former Cowboys, Emmitt Smith and Keyshawn Johnson also provided roles in the studio for Sunday NFL Countdown and Monday Night Countdown. At Monday Night Football, Joe Theismann was dropped (and would later resign from the network) after seventeen years in the booth between the Sunday and Monday Night packages, and former Philadelphia Eagles quarterback and current Philadelphia Soul (AFL) president Ron Jaworski took his place alongside Mike Tirico and Tony Kornheiser. Part of the reason that Jaworski replaced Theismann was because of his chemistry with Kornheiser on Pardon the Interruption, where Jaworski was a frequent guest during the football season.

NBC's Football Night in America also made two changes. MSNBC Countdown anchor Keith Olbermann joined Bob Costas and Cris Collinsworth as another co-host, while Sterling Sharpe exited as a studio analyst, and former New York Giants running back Tiki Barber replaced him. In another change, Faith Hill took over singing "Waiting All Day For Sunday Night" for Pink.

In the second year of the NFL Network's "Run to the Playoffs", Marshall Faulk and Deion Sanders replaced Dick Vermeil for two games when Collinsworth was unavailable. An unforced change saw Bryant Gumbel miss the Broncos–Texans game December 13 due to a sore throat and NBC announcer Tom Hammond step into Gumbel's play-by-play role in what turned out to be more or less a preview of one of NBC's Wild Card Game announcing teams.

=== Controversy surrounding NFL Network coverage ===
The dispute between the NFL Network and various cable companies involving the distribution of the cable channel continued throughout the season, getting the attention of government officials when the NFL Network was scheduled to televise two high-profile regular season games: the Packers-Cowboys game on November 29 and the Patriots-Giants game on December 29. In the case of the Packers-Cowboys game, the carriage was so limited that even Governor of Wisconsin Jim Doyle went to his brother's house to watch the game on satellite (which is where the majority of the viewers watch the network). The contest drew a network record 10.1 million viewers, a high-water mark at that time.

Some politicians urged the league to seek a resolution to conflict. In December, Massachusetts Senator John Kerry wrote a letter to NFL Commissioner Roger Goodell asking for the league to settle their differences in time for the Patriots-Giants game. Because the game, as it turned out, would be the Patriots' attempt to seal the record that would make them the first undefeated team in 35 years, Kerry urged for a solution to be decided upon in time so that Americans can witness "an historic event". Also, Pennsylvania Senator Arlen Specter threatened to introduce legislation to eliminate the league's freedom from antitrust laws.

On December 26, the NFL announced that, despite initial plans to broadcast the game only on the NFL Network, the game would be presented in a three-network simulcast with both CBS and NBC, the first time an NFL game would be broadcast on three networks, and the first simulcast of any pro football game since Super Bowl I. Nielsen ratings saw CBS with 15.7 million viewers, NBC with 13.2 million viewers and NFL Network with 4.5 million viewers for the game. In addition, local stations in New York City (WWOR-TV in nearby Secaucus, New Jersey), Boston (WCVB-TV), and Manchester, New Hampshire (WMUR-TV), all previously signed on to carry the game in the teams' home markets, added 1.2 million viewers, making it the most watched television show since the 2007 Oscars and the most watched regular season NFL telecast in twelve years.
