= 2010 Tennessee Titans season =

51st season in franchise history; last one with Jeff Fisher

- Owner: Bud Adams
- General manager: Mike Reinfeldt
- Head coach: Jeff Fisher
- Home stadium: LP Field

Results
- Record: 6–10
- Division place: 4th AFC South
- Playoffs: Did not qualify
- Pro Bowlers: RB Chris Johnson; DE Jason Babin; FS Michael Griffin; KR Marc Mariani

The 2010 season was the Tennessee Titans' 41st in the National Football League (NFL), their 51st overall and their 14th season in Tennessee. Despite starting the season 5–2, they lost eight of their last nine games and finished with a 6–10 record, a regression from their 8–8 record in 2009; this was the Titans' first losing season since 2005 and first last place finish in the AFC South since 2004. This was the Titans' final season under head coach Jeff Fisher, who resigned on January 27, 2011, after 17 seasons with the team.

== Offseason ==
=== Personnel changes ===
On January 25, Kennedy Pola, who previously served as the Jacksonville Jaguars' running backs coach for the past five seasons, was hired to the same position with the Titans, replacing Earnest Byner, who was fired the same day. (Ironically, Byner was later named the new Jaguars' running backs coach ten days later.) On May 14, Ruston Webster, who served as the Seattle Seahawks' vice president of player personnel for the past four seasons, was hired to the same position with the Titans.

On July 27, Kennedy Pola left the Titans and accepted the offensive coordinator position at USC. On July 28, the following changes were made to the Titans' coaching staff: Craig Johnson was moved from quarterbacks coach to the running backs coach vacated by Kennedy Pola and will also serve as assistant head coach. Dowell Loggains, who previously served as quality control of offense, was named the new quarterbacks coach, while offensive assistant Richie Hessman will serve as quality control of offense.

=== Free agents ===
Position	Player	Tag	Date signed	2010 team	Notes & references
ILB	Colin Allred	ERFA	February 17	Titans	
G	Eugene Amano	UFA	February 17	Titans	
LS/ILB	Ken Amato	UFA	March 5	Titans	
DE	Dave Ball	RFA	March 16	Titans	
DT	Tony Brown	RFA	April 22	Titans	
OLB	Keith Bulluck	UFA	July 25	Giants	
TE	Alge Crumpler	UFA	March 24	Patriots	
CB	Nick Harper	UFA			
P	Craig Hentrich	UFA	announced his retirement on February 17		
CB	Rod Hood	UFA			
FS	Kevin Kaesviharn	UFA			
DE	Jevon Kearse	UFA			
C	Kevin Mawae	UFA			
SS	Donnie Nickey	UFA	February 23	Titans	
T/G	Mike Otto	ERFA	February 17	Titans	
TE	Bo Scaife	RFA	March 17	Titans	
ILB	Stephen Tulloch	RFA	June 14	Titans	
DE	Kyle Vanden Bosch	UFA	March 5	Lions	
DT	Kevin Vickerson	RFA	April 13	traded to the Seahawks on April 24	
RB	LenDale White	RFA	April 14	traded to the Seahawks on April 24, released on May 28, signed with the Broncos on August 4	

Player re-signed by the Titans

=== 2010 draft class ===
Round	Selection	Player	Position	College
1	16	Derrick Morgan	DE	Georgia Tech
2	None			
3	77	Damian Williams	WR	USC
3	97	Rennie Curran	LB	Georgia
4	104	Alterraun Verner	CB	UCLA
5	148	Robert Johnson	CB	Utah
6	176	Rusty Smith	QB	Florida Atlantic
6	207	Myron Rolle	SS	Florida State
7	222	Marc Mariani	WR	Montana
7	241	David Howard	DT	Brown

compensatory selection

== Coaching staff ==
2010 Tennessee Titans staff
Front office: Founder/owner/chairman/president/CEO – Bud Adams; Senior executive vice president/general counsel – Steve Underwood; Executive vice president/general manager – Mike Reinfeldt; Vice president of player personnel – Ruston Webster; Senior director of football administration – Vincent Marino; Director of pro scouting – Lake Dawson; National supervisor of college scouting – C. O. Brocato; Head coaches: Head coach/executive vice president – Jeff Fisher; Assistant head coach/running backs – Craig Johnson; Assistant head coach/linebackers – Dave McGinnis; Offensive coaches: Offensive coordinator – Mike Heimerdinger; Quarterbacks/pass game – Dowell Loggains; Wide receivers – Fred Graves; Tight ends – John Zernhelt; Offensive line – Mike Munchak; Quality control/offense – Richie Wessman	Defensive coaches: Defensive coordinator – Chuck Cecil; Defensive line – Jim Washburn; Secondary – Marcus Robertson; Assistant secondary – Tim Hauck; Defensive assistant/quality control – Rayna Stewart; Special teams coaches: Special teams – Alan Lowry; Assistant special teams – Marty Galbraith; Strength and Conditioning Coaches: Assistant head coach/strength and conditioning – Steve Watterson

== Final roster ==
2010 Tennessee Titans roster
Quarterbacks (QB): 5 Kerry Collins; 7 Chris Simms; 11 Rusty Smith; Running backs (RB): 45 Ahmard Hall FB; 28 Chris Johnson; 21 Javon Ringer; Wide receivers (WR): 18 Kenny Britt; 12 Justin Gage; 87 Lavelle Hawkins; 83 Marc Mariani; 84 Randy Moss; 85 Nate Washington; 17 Damian Williams; Tight ends (TE): 89 Jared Cook; 80 Bo Scaife; 88 Craig Stevens	Offensive linemen (OL): 64 Leroy Harris G; 70 Troy Kropog T; 60 Kevin Matthews C; 66 Mike Otto T; 71 Michael Roos T; 73 Jake Scott G; 76 David Stewart T; 61 Fernando Velasco C/G; Defensive linemen (DL): 93 Jason Babin DE; 72 Hall Davis DE; 99 Marques Douglas DT; 78 Jacob Ford DE; 75 Jovan Haye DT/DE; 95 William Hayes DE; 91 Jason Jones DT; 94 Sen'Derrick Marks DT; 96 Malcolm Sheppard DT	Linebackers (LB): 57 Patrick Bailey OLB; 53 Rennie Curran MLB; 51 Gerald McRath OLB; 59 Tim Shaw OLB; 50 David Thornton OLB; 55 Stephen Tulloch MLB; 92 Will Witherspoon OLB; Defensive backs (DB): 31 Cortland Finnegan CB; 22 Vincent Fuller FS; 33 Michael Griffin FS; 24 Chris Hope SS; 38 Pete Ittersagen CB; 32 Robert Johnson FS; 30 Jason McCourty CB; 23 Donnie Nickey SS; 39 Nick Schommer SS; 20 Alterraun Verner CB; Special teams (ST): 58 Ken Amato LS; 2 Rob Bironas K; 6 Brett Kern P	Practice squad: 36 Herb Donaldson RB; 77 Ryan Durand G; 79 Pannel Egboh DE; 48 Riar Geer TE; 67 Jeff Hansen G; 35 Chris Hawkins CB; 25 Myron Rolle S; 49 Patrick Trahan LB; Reserve: 56 Colin Allred OLB (IR); 54 Eugene Amano C (IR); 98 Dave Ball DE (IR); -- Kareem Brown DE (IR); 97 Tony Brown DT (IR); 37 Roderick Hood CB (IR); 90 Marcus Howard DE (IR); 13 Stafon Johnson RB (IR); -- Dominique Lindsay RB (IR); 90 Derrick Morgan DE (IR); 29 Ryan Mouton CB (IR); 52 Jamie Winborn OLB (IR); 10 Vince Young QB (IR); Rookies in italics 53 active, 13 reserve, 8 practice squad

== Preseason ==
=== Schedule ===
The Titans preseason schedule was announced on March 31, 2010.

Week	Date	Opponent	Result	Record	Game site	NFL.com recap
1	August 14	at Seattle Seahawks	L 18–20	0–1	Qwest Field	Recap
2	August 23	Arizona Cardinals	W 24–10	1–1	LP Field	Recap
3	August 28	at Carolina Panthers	L 7–15	1–2	Bank of America Stadium	Recap
4	September 2	New Orleans Saints	W 27–24	2–2	LP Field	Recap

== Regular season ==
=== Schedule ===
The Titans' regular season schedule was announced on April 20, 2010.

Week	Date	Opponent	Score	Record	Venue	Recap
1	September 12	Oakland Raiders	W 38–13	1–0	LP Field	Recap
2	September 19	Pittsburgh Steelers	L 11–19	1–1	LP Field	Recap
3	September 26	at New York Giants	W 29–10	2–1	New Meadowlands Stadium	Recap
4	October 3	Denver Broncos	L 20–26	2–2	LP Field	Recap
5	October 10	at Dallas Cowboys	W 34–27	3–2	Cowboys Stadium	Recap
6	October 18	at Jacksonville Jaguars	W 30–3	4–2	EverBank Field	Recap
7	October 24	Philadelphia Eagles	W 37–19	5–2	LP Field	Recap
8	October 31	at San Diego Chargers	L 25–33	5–3	Qualcomm Stadium	Recap
9	Bye					
10	November 14	at Miami Dolphins	L 17–29	5–4	Sun Life Stadium	Recap
11	November 21	Washington Redskins	L 16–19 (OT)	5–5	LP Field	Recap
12	November 28	at Houston Texans	L 0–20	5–6	Reliant Stadium	Recap
13	December 5	Jacksonville Jaguars	L 6–17	5–7	LP Field	Recap
14	December 9	Indianapolis Colts	L 28–30	5–8	LP Field	Recap
15	December 19	Houston Texans	W 31–17	6–8	LP Field	Recap
16	December 26	at Kansas City Chiefs	L 14–34	6–9	Arrowhead Stadium	Recap
17	January 2	at Indianapolis Colts	L 20–23	6–10	Lucas Oil Stadium	Recap

=== Standings ===
AFC South
	W	L	T	PCT	DIV	CONF	PF	PA	STK
^{(3)} Indianapolis Colts	10	6	0	.625	4–2	8–4	435	388	W4
Jacksonville Jaguars	8	8	0	.500	3–3	7–5	353	419	L3
Houston Texans	6	10	0	.375	3–3	4–8	390	427	W1
Tennessee Titans	6	10	0	.375	2–4	3–9	356	339	L2

=== Game summaries ===
==== Week 1: vs. Oakland Raiders ====
Week 1: Oakland Raiders at Tennessee Titans – Game summary

Quarter	1	2	3	4	Total
Raiders	3	3	0	7	13
Titans	10	14	7	7	38

at LP Field, Nashville, Tennessee

- Date: September 12
- Game time: 12:00 p.m. CDT
- Game weather: 82 °F (28 °C) (Sunny)
- Game attendance: 69,143
- Referee: Bill Leavy
- TV announcers (CBS): Ian Eagle and Dan Fouts
- Recap

Game information

First quarter

- OAK – Sebastian Janikowski 34-yard field goal. Raiders 3–0. Drive: 9 plays, 18 yards, 4:36.
- TEN – Nate Washington 56-yard pass from Vince Young (Rob Bironas kick). Titans 7–3. Drive: 3 plays, 74 yards, 1:38.
- TEN – Rob Bironas 43-yard field goal. Titans 10–3. Drive: 4 plays, −2 yards, 1:27.

Second quarter

- TEN – Javon Ringer 15-yard run (Rob Bironas kick). Titans 17–3. Drive: 8 plays, 61 yards, 3:49.
- TEN – Chris Johnson 76-yard run (Rob Bironas kick). Titans 24–3. Drive: 1 plays, 76 yards, 0:13.
- OAK – Sebastian Janikowski 30-yard field goal. Titans 24–6. Drive: 8 plays, 63 yards, 1:27.

Third quarter

- TEN – Chris Johnson 4-yard run (Rob Bironas kick). Titans 31–6. Drive: 10 plays, 57 yards, 5:10.

Fourth quarter

- TEN – Bo Scaife 1-yard pass from Vince Young (Rob Bironas kick). Titans 38–6. Drive: 3 plays, 3 yards, 1:01.
- OAK – Darren McFadden 7-yard pass from Jason Campbell (Sebastian Janikowski kick). Titans 38–13. Drive: 12 plays, 80 yards, 4:57.

Top passers

- OAK – Jason Campbell – 22/37, 180 yards, TD, INT
- TEN – Vince Young – 13/17, 154 yards, 2 TD

Top rushers

- OAK – Darren McFadden – 18 rushes, 95 yards
- TEN – Chris Johnson – 27 rushes, 142 yards, 2 TD

Top receivers

- OAK – Darren McFadden – 6 receptions, 55 yards, TD
- TEN – Nate Washington – 3 receptions, 88 yards, TD

The Titans began their season at home against the Oakland Raiders. Tennessee trailed early in the first quarter as Raiders kicker Sebastian Janikowski made a 34-yard field goal. Tennessee answered as quarterback Vince Young hooked up with wide receiver Nate Washington on a 56-yard touchdown pass, followed by kicker Rob Bironas nailing a 43-yard field goal. The Titans added to their lead in the second quarter with a 15-yard touchdown run from running back Javon Ringer, followed by Chris Johnson's 76-yard touchdown run.

Tennessee continued its dominating day in the third quarter as Johnson got a 4-yard touchdown run. In the fourth quarter, the Titans wrapped up their performance with Young finding tight end Bo Scaife on a 1-yard touchdown pass. Afterwards, Oakland ended the game with quarterback Jason Campbell completing a 7-yard touchdown pass to running back Darren McFadden.

With the win, Tennessee began its season at 1–0.

==== Week 2: vs. Pittsburgh Steelers ====
Week 2: Pittsburgh Steelers at Tennessee Titans – Game summary

Quarter	1	2	3	4	Total
Steelers	7	6	0	6	19
Titans	3	0	0	8	11

at LP Field, Nashville, Tennessee

- Date: September 19
- Game time: 1:00 p.m. EDT
- Game weather: 91 °F (33 °C) (Sunny)
- Game attendance: 69,143
- Referee: John Parry
- TV announcers (CBS): Kevin Harlan and Solomon Wilcots
- Recap

Game information

First quarter

- PIT – Antonio Brown 89-yard kickoff return (Jeff Reed kick). Steelers 7–0. Drive: 0 plays, 0 yards, 0:14.
- TEN – Rob Bironas 21-yard field goal. Steelers 7–3. Drive: 6 plays, 34 yards, 2:52.

Second quarter

- PIT – Jeff Reed 36-yard field goal. Steelers 10–3. Drive: 11 plays, 62 yards, 6:33.
- PIT – Jeff Reed 34-yard field goal. Steelers 13–3. Drive: 4 plays, 7 yards, 1:36.

Third quarter

- No scoring plays.

Fourth quarter

- PIT – Jeff Reed 25-yard field goal. Steelers 16–3. Drive: 8 plays, 28 yards, 4:53.
- PIT – Jeff Reed 27-yard field goal. Steelers 19–3. Drive: 4 plays, 6 yards, 1:33.
- TEN – Nate Washington 2-yard pass from Kerry Collins (Kerry Collins – Kenny Britt pass). Steelers 19–11. Drive: 17 plays, 85 yards, 4:01.

Top passers

- PIT – Charlie Batch – 5/11, 25 yards
- TEN – Kerry Collins – 17/25, 149 yards, TD, INT

Top rushers

- PIT – Rashard Mendenhall – 23 rushes, 69 yards
- TEN – Chris Johnson – 16 rushes, 34 yards

Top receivers

- PIT – Mike Wallace – 2 receptions, 25 yards
- TEN – Justin Gage – 4 receptions, 74 yards

Hoping to maintain their winning streak the Titans played on home ground for an AFC duel with the Steelers. In the first quarter the Titans trailed early when WR Antonio Brown returned a kickoff 89 yards to the endzone for a touchdown. The Titans tried to cut the lead with kicker Rob Bironas nailing a 21-yard field goal. In the 2nd quarter the Titans progressively fell further behind with kicker Jeff Reed hitting a 36 and a 34-yard field goal, followed in the fourth quarter by his 25 and 27-yard field goal to go up 19–3. The Titans tried to tie the game when QB Kerry Collins threw a 2-yard TD pass to WR Nate Washington (With the two-point conversion made), but the Steelers defense prevented any more scoring from the Titans, giving Tennessee the loss.

With the loss, Tennessee fell to 1–1.

==== Week 3: at New York Giants ====
Week 3: Tennessee Titans at New York Giants – Game summary

Quarter	1	2	3	4	Total
Titans	3	7	9	10	29
Giants	0	10	0	0	10

at New Meadowlands Stadium, East Rutherford, New Jersey

- Date: September 26
- Game time: 12:00 p.m. CDT
- Game weather: 70 °F (21 °C) (Cloudy)
- Game attendance: 79,386
- Referee: Tony Corrente
- TV announcers (CBS): Greg Gumbel and Dan Dierdorf
- Recap

Game information

First quarter

- TEN – Rob Bironas 48-yard field goal. Titans 3–0. Drive: 7 plays, 21 yards, 3:19.

Second quarter

- TEN – Chris Johnson 1-yard run (Rob Bironas kick). Titans 10–0. Drive: 10 plays, 57 yards, 5:23.
- NYG – Lawrence Tynes 50-yard field goal. Titans 10–3. Drive: 8 plays, 38 yards, 4:31.
- NYG – Ahmad Bradshaw 10-yard run (Lawrence Tynes kick). Tied 10–10. Drive: 9 plays, 63 yards, 2:12.

Third quarter

- TEN – Penalty on Ahmad Bradshaw enforced in the endzone for a safety. Titans 12–10.
- TEN – Kenny Britt 13-yard pass from Vince Young (Rob Bironas kick). Titans 19–10. Drive: 6 plays, 51 yards, 2:56.

Fourth quarter

- TEN – Rob Bironas 22-yard field goal. Titans 22–10. Drive: 12 plays, 46 yards, 5:39.
- TEN – Chris Johnson 8-yard run (Rob Bironas kick). Titans 29–10. Drive: 5 plays, 65 yards, 1:54.

Top passers

- TEN – Vince Young – 10/16, 118 yards, TD
- NYG – Eli Manning – 34/48, 386 yards, 2 INT

Top rushers

- TEN – Chris Johnson – 32 rushes, 125 yards, 2 TD
- NYG – Ahmad Bradshaw – 15 rushes, 88 yards, TD

Top receivers

- TEN – Justin Gage – 3 receptions, 39 yards
- NYG – Steve Smith – 9 receptions, 103 yards

Hoping to rebound from their loss to the Steelers, the Titans flew to New Meadowlands Stadium for an interconference duel with the New York Giants. In the first quarter, Tennessee took the early lead when kicker Rob Bironas nailed a 48-yard field goal, followed in the second quarter by running back Chris Johnson getting a 1-yard touchdown run. The Giants replied with kicker Lawrence Tynes nailing a 50-yard field goal, followed by running back Ahmad Bradshaw getting a 10-yard touchdown run to tie the game.

In the third quarter, near the Giants endzone, a Chop Block penalty was enforced on Bradshaw into the endzone for a safety. The Titans started to pull away with quarterback Vince Young completed a 13-yard touchdown pass to wide receiver Kenny Britt, followed in the fourth quarter by Bironas getting a 22-yard field goal. Finally, Johnson closed out the game with an 8-yard touchdown run.

With the win, Tennessee improved to 2–1.

==== Week 4: vs. Denver Broncos ====
Week 4: Denver Broncos at Tennessee Titans – Game summary

Quarter	1	2	3	4	Total
Broncos	0	10	6	10	26
Titans	0	10	10	0	20

at LP Field, Nashville, Tennessee

- Date: October 3
- Game time: 12:00 p.m. CDT
- Game weather: 57 °F (14 °C) (Cloudy)
- Referee: Clete Blakeman
- TV announcers (CBS): Kevin Harlan and Solomon Wilcots
- Recap

Game information

First quarter

- No scoring plays.

Second quarter

- DEN – Eddie Royal 2-yard pass from Kyle Orton (Matt Prater kick). Broncos 7–0. Drive: 5 plays, 68 yards, 2:23.
- TEN – Kenny Britt 8-yard pass from Vince Young (Rob Bironas kick). Tied 7–7. Drive: 4 plays, 71 yards, 2:06.
- DEN – Matt Prater 36-yard field goal. Broncos 10–7. Drive: 13 plays, 62 yards, 4:28.
- TEN – Rob Bironas 55-yard field goal. Tied 10–10. Drive: 4 plays, 26 yards, 0:23.

Third quarter

- DEN – Matt Prater 36-yard field goal. Broncos 13–10. Drive: 9 plays, 51 yards, 4:30.
- TEN – Marc Mariani 98-yard kickoff return (Rob Bironas kick). Titans 17–13. Drive: 0 plays, 0 yards, 0:11.
- DEN – Matt Prater 35-yard field goal. Titans 17–16. Drive: 4 plays, 6 yards, 2:07.
- TEN – Rob Bironas 46-yard field goal. Titans 20–16. Drive: 7 plays, 39 yards, 3:12.

Fourth quarter

- DEN – Correll Buckhalter 6-yard pass from Kyle Orton (Matt Prater kick). Broncos 23–20. Drive: 5 plays, 49 yards, 1:09.
- DEN – Matt Prater 36-yard field goal. Broncos 26–20. Drive: 4 plays, −1 yards, 1:05.

Top passers

- DEN – Kyle Orton – 35/50, 341 yards, 2 TD, INT
- TEN – Vince Young – 17/28, 173 yards, TD

Top rushers

- DEN – Kyle Orton – 3 rushes, 11 yards
- TEN – Chris Johnson – 19 rushes, 53 yards

Top receivers

- DEN – Brandon Lloyd – 11 receptions, 115 yards
- TEN – Nate Washington – 4 receptions, 42 yards

The Titans' fourth game was an AFC duel with the Broncos at home ground. The Titans trailed early in the 2nd quarter as QB Kyle Orton got a 2-yard TD pass to WR Eddie Royal. They replied with QB Vince Young getting an 8-yard TD pass to WR Kenny Britt. The Broncos' kicker Matt Prater made a 36-yard field goal to give Denver a three-point lead, but the Titans replied when kicker Rob Bironas nailed an incredible 55-yard field goal. In the 3rd quarter the Titans trailed slightly when Matt Prater made a 36-yard field goal, but after that, WR Marc Mariani returned the kickoff and ran 98 yards to the endzone for a touchdown, giving the Titans the lead. The lead was narrowed when Prater made a 35-yard field goal, but was increased again when Bironas made a 46-yard field goal. In the 4th quarter Tennessee fell behind when QB Kyle Orton completed a 6-yard TD pass to RB Correll Buckhalter, followed by Prater making another 36-yard field goal.

With the loss, the Titans fell to 2–2.

==== Week 5: at Dallas Cowboys ====
Week 5: Tennessee Titans at Dallas Cowboys – Game summary

Quarter	1	2	3	4	Total
Titans	10	7	3	14	34
Cowboys	3	7	7	10	27

at Cowboys Stadium, Arlington, Texas

- Date: October 10
- Game time: 3:15 p.m. CDT
- Game weather: None (retractable roof closed)
- Game attendance: 90,616
- Referee: Jeff Triplette
- TV announcers (CBS): Jim Nantz and Phil Simms
- Recap

Game information

First quarter

- TEN – Nate Washington 24-yard pass from Vince Young (Rob Bironas kick). Titans 7–0. Drive: 6 plays, 80 yards, 2:20.
- TEN – Rob Bironas 52-yard field goal. Titans 10–0. Drive: 9 plays, 52 yards, 4:41.
- DAL – David Buehler 51-yard field goal. Titans 10–3. Drive: 8 plays, 39 yards, 4:25.

Second quarter

- TEN – Kenny Britt 12-yard pass from Vince Young (Rob Bironas kick). Titans 17–7. Drive: 7 plays, 67 yards, 3:29.
- DAL – Roy E. Williams 12-yard pass from Tony Romo (David Buehler kick). Titans 17–10. Drive: 8 plays, 75 yards, 1:42.

Third quarter

- DAL – Miles Austin 69-yard pass from Tony Romo (David Buehler kick). Tied 17–17. Drive: 3 plays, 75 yards, 1:26.
- TEN – Rob Bironas 40-yard field goal. Titans 20–17. Drive: 5 plays, 59 yards, 1:53.

Fourth quarter

- DAL – David Buehler 26-yard field goal. Tied 20–20. Drive: 9 plays, 56 yards, 5:05.
- TEN – Chris Johnson 1-yard run (Rob Bironas kick). Titans 27–20. Drive: 1 plays, 1 yards, 0:04.
- DAL – Jason Witten 18-yard pass from Tony Romo (David Buehler kick). Tied 27–27. Drive: 7 plays, 60 yards, 2:56.
- TEN – Chris Johnson 1-yard run (Rob Bironas kick). Titans 34–27. Drive: 3 plays, 5 yards, 1:02.

Top passers

- TEN – Vince Young – 12/25, 173 yards, 2 TD
- DAL – Tony Romo – 31/46, 406 yards, 3 TD, 3 INT

Top rushers

- TEN – Chris Johnson – 19 rushes, 131 yards, 2 TD
- DAL – Felix Jones – 15 rushes, 109 yards

Top receivers

- TEN – Kenny Britt – 4 receptions, 86 yards, TD
- DAL – Miles Austin – 9 receptions, 166 yards, TD

Hoping to rebound from their home loss to the Broncos, the Titans flew to Cowboys Stadium for a Week 5 interconference duel with the Dallas Cowboys. Tennessee delivered the opening punch in the first quarter as quarterback Vince Young completed a 24-yard touchdown pass to wide receiver Nate Washington, followed by kicker Rob Bironas making a 52-yard field goal. Afterwards, the Cowboys answered with kicker David Buehler getting a 51-field goal. In the second quarter, the Titans added to their lead as Young connected with wide receiver Kenny Britt on a 12-yard touchdown pass. Dallas came right back with quarterback Tony Romo completing a 6-yard touchdown pass to wide receiver Roy Williams.

The Cowboys tied the game in the third quarter as Romo threw a 69-yard touchdown pass to wide receiver Miles Austin, yet Tennessee regained the lead as Bironas booted a 40-yard field goal. In the fourth quarter, Dallas caught up again as Buehler kicked a 26-yard field goal. Afterwards, the Titans struck back as running back Chris Johnson got a 1-yard touchdown run. However, the Cowboys tied the game again as Romo connected with tight end Jason Witten on an 18-yard touchdown pass. Fortunately, Tennessee came right back as Johnson got another 1-yard touchdown run.

With the win, the Titans improved to 3–2.

==== Week 6: at Jacksonville Jaguars ====
Week 6: Tennessee Titans at Jacksonville Jaguars – Game summary

Quarter	1	2	3	4	Total
Titans	7	10	3	10	30
Jaguars	0	0	3	0	3

at EverBank Field, Jacksonville, Florida

- Date: October 18
- Game time: 8:30 p.m. EDT
- Game weather: 70 °F (21 °C) (Clear)
- Game attendance: 63,625
- Referee: Mike Carey
- TV announcers (ESPN): Mike Tirico, Ron Jaworski, Jon Gruden, Michele Tafoya, & Suzy Kolber
- Game Recap

Game information

First quarter

- TEN – Kenny Britt 23-yard pass from Vince Young (Rob Bironas kick). Titans 7–0. Drive: 6 plays, 79 yards, 2:26.

Second quarter

- TEN – Bo Scaife 2-yard pass from Kerry Collins (Rob Bironas kick). Titans 14–0. Drive: 8 plays, 37 yards, 3:54.
- TEN – Rob Bironas 26-yard field goal. Titans 17–0. Drive: 10 plays, 36 yards, 4:38.

Third quarter

- TEN – Rob Bironas 33-yard field goal. Titans 20–0. Drive: 5 plays, 18 yards, 2:45.
- JAC – Josh Scobee 33-yard field goal. Titans 20–3. Drive: 9 plays, 50 yards, 4:20.

Fourth quarter

- TEN – Rob Bironas 36-yard field goal. Titans 23–3. Drive: 12 plays, 55 yards, 7:53.
- TEN – Chris Johnson 35-yard run (Rob Bironas kick). Titans 30–3. Drive: 9 plays, 80 yards, 4:20.

Top passers

- JAC – Trent Edwards – 14/24, 140 yards, 2 INT
- TEN – Kerry Collins – 11/16, 110 yards, TD

Top rushers

- JAC – Maurice Jones-Drew – 17 rushes, 57 yards
- TEN – Chris Johnson – 26 rushes, 111 yards, TD

Top receivers

- JAC – Mike Thomas – 8 receptions, 88 yards
- TEN – Bo Scaife – 5 receptions, 53 yards, TD

Coming off their road win over the Cowboys, the Titans flew to EverBank Field for a Week 6 AFC South duel with the Jacksonville Jaguars on Monday night. Tennessee delivered the opening strike in the first quarter as quarterback Vince Young found wide receiver Kenny Britt on a 24-yard touchdown pass. In the second quarter, the Titans added onto their lead as quarterback Kerry Collins hooked up with tight end Bo Scaife on a 2-yard touchdown pass, followed by kicker Rob Bironas booting a 26-yard field goal.

Tennessee continued its dominating night in the third quarter as Bironas nailed a 33-yard field goal. The Jaguars finally answered with a 33-yard field goal from kicker Josh Scobee. The Titans pulled away in the fourth quarter as Bironas booted a 36-yard field goal, capped off by a 35-yard touchdown run from running back Chris Johnson.

With the win, Tennessee improved to 4–2.

==== Week 7: vs. Philadelphia Eagles ====
Week 7: Philadelphia Eagles at Tennessee Titans – Game summary

Quarter	1	2	3	4	Total
Eagles	0	13	3	3	19
Titans	0	7	3	27	37

at LP Field, Nashville, Tennessee

- Date: October 24
- Game time: 12:00 p.m. CDT
- Game weather: 78 °F (26 °C) (Cloudy)
- Game attendance: 69,143
- Referee: Ed Hochuli
- TV announcers (Fox): Kenny Albert, Daryl Johnston and Tony Siragusa
- Recap

Game information

First quarter

- No scoring plays.

Second quarter

- PHI – David Akers 25-yard field goal. Eagles 3–0. Drive: 14 plays, 45 yards, 7:26.
- TEN – Kenny Britt 26-yard pass from Kerry Collins (Rob Bironas kick). Titans 7–3. Drive: 5 plays, 45 yards, 1:28.
- PHI – Riley Cooper 5-yard pass from Kevin Kolb (David Akers kick). Eagles 10–7. Drive: 10 plays, 80 yards, 4:33.
- PHI – David Akers 46-yard field goal. Eagles 13–7. Drive: 7 plays, 29 yards, 1:06.

Third quarter

- PHI – David Akers 46-yard field goal. Eagles 16–7. Drive: 9 plays, 47 yards, 3:46.
- TEN – Rob Bironas 41-yard field goal. Eagles 16–10. Drive: 9 plays, 74 yards, 4:33.

Fourth quarter

- PHI – David Akers 28-yard field goal. Eagles 19–10. Drive: 7 plays, 35 yards, 2:52.
- TEN – Kenny Britt 80-yard pass from Kerry Collins (Rob Bironas kick). Eagles 19–17. Drive: 1 plays, 80 yards, 0:13.
- TEN – Rob Bironas 38-yard field goal. Titans 20–19. Drive: 6 plays, 46 yards, 2:40.
- TEN – Kenny Britt 16-yard pass from Kerry Collins (Rob Bironas kick). Titans 27–19. Drive: 6 plays, 53 yards, 2:27.
- TEN – Rob Bironas 33-yard field goal. Titans 30–19. Drive: 7 plays, 18 yards, 3:15.
- TEN – Cortland Finnegan 41-yard interception return (Rob Bironas kick). Titans 37–19.

Top passers

- PHI – Kevin Kolb – 26/48, 231 yards, TD, 2 INT
- TEN – Kerry Collins – 17/31, 276 yards, 3 TD, 2 INT

Top rushers

- PHI – LeSean McCoy – 16 rushes, 48 yards
- TEN – Chris Johnson – 24 rushes, 66 yards

Top receivers

- PHI – Jason Avant – 6 receptions, 60 yards
- TEN – Kenny Britt – 7 receptions, 225 yards, 3 TD

Hoping to increase their winning streak the Titans played on home ground for an Interconference duel with the Eagles. In the second quarter the Titans trailed with kicker David Akers making a 25-yard field goal. But they put themselves ahead with QB Kerry Collins completing a 26-yard TD pass to WR Kenny Britt. The Eagles replied with QB Kevin Kolb making a 5-yard TD pass to WR Riley Cooper, followed by kicker David Akers hitting a 46-yard field goal. In the third quarter the Titans fell further behind with Akers making a 46-yard field goal. They soon replied with kicker Rob Bironas nailing a 41-yard field goal, but the Eagles continued to score in the 4th with Akers getting a 28-yard field goal. Eventually, they rallied to take a big lead with Collins completing an 80-yard TD pass to Britt, followed by Bironas hitting a 38-yard field goal. Collins then found Britt for the third time in the game on a 16-yard TD pass before Bironas made a 33-yard field goal. The Titans continued to get their momentum going with CB Cortland Finnegan returning an interception 41 yards for a touchdown.

With the win, the Titans improved to 5–2.

==== Week 8: at San Diego Chargers ====
Week 8: Tennessee Titans at San Diego Chargers – Game summary

Quarter	1	2	3	4	Total
Titans	5	14	0	6	25
Chargers	7	7	10	9	33

at Qualcomm Stadium, San Diego, California

- Date: October 31
- Game time: 3:05 p.m. CDT
- Game weather: 65 °F (18 °C) (Sunny)
- Game attendance: 59,260
- Referee: Bill Leavy
- TV announcers (CBS): Ian Eagle and Dan Fouts
- Recap

Game information

First quarter

- TEN – Punt blocked by Nick Schommer out of bounds in end zone for a Safety. Titans 2–0.
- SD – Mike Tolbert 1-yard run (Kris Brown kick). Chargers 7–2. Drive: 15 plays, 83 yards, 7:27.
- TEN – Rob Bironas 21-yard field goal. Chargers 7–5. Drive: 10 plays, 68 yards, 4:16.

Second quarter

- TEN – Craig Stevens 1-yard pass from Vince Young (Rob Bironas kick). Titans 12–7. Drive: 8 plays, 80 yards, 4:10.
- TEN – Chris Johnson 29-yard run (Rob Bironas kick). Titans 19–7. Drive: 3 plays, 74 yards, 1:38.
- SD – Ryan Mathews 7-yard run (Kris Brown kick). Titans 19–14. Drive: 5 plays, 72 yards, 2:48.

Third quarter

- SD – Kris Brown 34-yard field goal. Titans 19–17. Drive: 11 plays, 47 yards, 6:04.
- SD – Antonio Gates 48-yard pass from Philip Rivers (Kris Brown kick). Chargers 24–19. Drive: 4 plays, 91 yards, 1:52.

Fourth quarter

- SD – Kris Brown 36-yard field goal. Chargers 27–19. Drive: 9 plays, 73 yards, 5:51.
- TEN – Nate Washington 71-yard pass from Vince Young (pass failed). Chargers 27–25. Drive: 1 plays, 71 yards, 0:18.
- SD – Darren Sproles 13-yard pass from Philip Rivers (kick aborted). Chargers 33–25. Drive: 8 plays, 52 yards, 4:52.

Top passers

- TEN – Vince Young – 10/21, 253 yards, 2 TD
- SD – Philip Rivers – 27/36, 305 yards, 2 TD, INT

Top rushers

- TEN – Chris Johnson – 15 rushes, 59 yards, TD
- SD – Mike Tolbert – 11 rushes, 63 yards, TD

Top receivers

- TEN – Nate Washington – 4 receptions, 117 yards, TD
- SD – Antonio Gates – 5 receptions, 123 yards, TD

Hoping to increase their current winning streak the Titans flew to Qualcomm Stadium for an AFC duel with the Chargers. In the first quarter the Titans took the lead when the Chargers' punt was blocked by Nick Schommer out of bounds for a safety. The Chargers replied with FB Mike Tolbert getting a 1-yard TD run. The Titans went on a scoring rally with kicker Rob Bironas nailing a 21-yard field goal, followed in the second quarter by QB Vince Young completing a 1-yard TD pass to TE Craig Stevens. They increased their lead with RB Chris Johnson getting a 29-yard TD run. The Chargers went on a scoring rally with RB Ryan Mathews making a 7-yard TD run, followed in the third quarter by kicker Kris Brown making a 34-yard field goal. QB Philip Rivers then completed a 48-yard TD pass to TE Antonio Gates before Brown made a 36-yard field goal. The Titans tried to come back with Young finding WR Nate Washington on a 71-yard TD pass (with a failed two-point conversion), but couldn't do anything after Rivers got a 13-yard TD pass to RB Darren Sproles.

With the loss, the Titans fell to 5–3.

==== Week 10: at Miami Dolphins ====
Week 10: Tennessee Titans at Miami Dolphins – Game summary

Quarter	1	2	3	4	Total
Titans	10	0	7	0	17
Dolphins	7	3	10	9	29

at Sun Life Stadium, Miami Gardens, Florida

- Date: November 14
- Game time: 1:00 p.m. EST
- Game weather: 79 °F (26 °C) (Fair)
- Game attendance: 65,585
- Referee: Pete Morelli
- TV announcers (CBS): Ian Eagle and Dan Fouts
- http://www.nfl.com/gamecenter/2010111400/2010/REG10/titans@dolphins

Game information

First quarter

- MIA – Ronnie Brown 2-yard run (Dan Carpenter kick). Dolphins 7–0. Drive: 6 plays, 31 yards, 2:44
- TEN – Chris Johnson 17-yard run (Rob Bironas kick). Tied 7–7. Drive: 6 plays, 80 yards, 2:51
- TEN – Rob Bironas 40-yard field goal. Titans 10–7. Drive: 4 plays, 6 yards, 1:26

Second quarter

- MIA – Dan Carpenter 23-yard field goal. Tied 10–10. Drive: 8 plays, 75 yards, 3:49

Third quarter

- MIA – Dan Carpenter 26-yard field goal. Dolphins 13–10. Drive: 11 plays, 75 yards, 6:53
- MIA – Patrick Cobbs 13-yard pass from Chad Henne (Dan Carpenter kick). Dolphins 20–10. Drive: 2 plays, 13 yards, 0:14
- TEN – Nate Washington 14-yard pass from Vince Young (Rob Bironas kick). Dolphins 20–17. Drive: 11 plays, 74 yards, 5:46

Fourth quarter

- MIA – Dan Carpenter 42-yard field goal. Dolphins 23–17. Drive: 8 plays, 41 yards, 2:43
- MIA – Anthony Fasano 9-yard pass from Tyler Thigpen (run failed). Dolphins 29–17. Drive: 9 plays, 85 yards, 4:27

Top passers

- TEN – Vince Young – 9/18, 92 rushes, TD, INT
- MIA – Chad Henne – 19/28, 240 yards, TD, INT

Top rushers

- TEN – Chris Johnson – 17 rushes, 117 yards, TD
- MIA – Ricky Williams – 11 rushes, 64 yards

Top receivers

- TEN – Bo Scaife – 7 receptions, 51 yards
- MIA – Anthony Fasano – 5 receptions, 107 yards, TD

Coming off their bye week the Titans flew to Sun Life Stadium for an AFC duel with the Dolphins. In the first quarter the Titans trailed early as RB Ronnie Brown got a 2-yard TD run. They replied with RB Chris Johnson getting a 17-yard TD run. They took the lead after kicker Rob Bironas nailed a 40-yard field goal. They fell behind after kicker Dan Carpenter made a 23 and a 26-yard field goal, which was soon followed by QB Chad Henne completing a 13-yard TD pass to RB Patrick Cobbs. The Titans replied with QB Vince Young completing a 14-yard TD pass to WR Nate Washington, but fell further behind after Carpenter got a 42-yard field goal, followed by QB Tyler Thigpen making a 9-yard TD pass to TE Anthony Fasano (With a failed two-point conversion). Then DB Reshad Jones tackled in the end zone for a Dolphins safety.

With the loss, the Titans fell to 5–4.

==== Week 11: vs. Washington Redskins ====
Week 11: Washington Redskins at Tennessee Titans – Game summary

Quarter	1	2	3	4	OT	Total
Redskins	7	3	3	3	3	19
Titans	7	3	3	3	0	16

at LP Field, Nashville, Tennessee

- Date: November 21
- Game time: 12:00 p.m. CST
- Game weather: 70 °F (21 °C) (Sunny)
- Game attendance: 69,143
- Referee: Terry McAulay
- TV announcers (Fox): Dick Stockton, Charles Davis, Jim Mora and Laura Okmin
- Recap

Game information

First quarter

- TEN – Marc Mariani 87-yard punt return (Rob Bironas kick). Titans 7–0.
- WAS – Santana Moss 5-yard pass from Donovan McNabb (Graham Gano kick). Tied 7–7. Drive: 8 plays, 79 yards, 3:16.

Second quarter

- WAS – Graham Gano 19-yard field goal. Redskins 10–7. Drive: 15 plays, 72 yards, 7:18.
- TEN – Rob Bironas 25-yard field goal. Tied 10–10. Drive: 13 plays, 73 yards, 7:07.

Third quarter

- TEN – Rob Bironas 32-yard field goal. Titans 13–10. Drive: 11 plays, 66 yards, 5:50.
- WAS – Graham Gano 40-yard field goal. Tied 13–13. Drive: 10 plays, 54 yards, 5:15.

Fourth quarter

- TEN – Rob Bironas 40-yard field goal. Titans 16–13. Drive: 7 plays, 72 yards, 3:31.
- WAS – Graham Gano 42-yard field goal. Tied 16–16. Drive: 9 plays, 50 yards, 3:16.

Overtime

- WAS – Graham Gano 38-yard field goal. Redskins 19–16. Drive: 10 plays, 57 yards, 5:09.

Top passers

- WAS – Donovan McNabb – 30/50, 376 yards, TD, INT
- TEN – Vince Young – 12/16, 165 yards

Top rushers

- WAS – Keiland Williams – 23 rushes, 68 yards
- TEN – Chris Johnson – 21 rushes, 130 yards

Top receivers

- WAS – Santana Moss – 6 receptions, 106 yards, TD
- TEN – Nate Washington – 5 receptions, 117 yards

Hoping to break their current losing streak the Titans played on home ground for an AFC duel with the Redskins. In the first quarter the Titans took a sudden lead with WR Marc Mariani returning a punt 87 yards for a touchdown. The Redskins replied with QB Donovan McNabb completing a 5-yard TD pass to WR Santana Moss, followed in the second quarter by kicker Graham Gano nailing a 19-yard field goal. The Titans got the lead back after kicker Rob Bironas made a 25 and a 32-yard field goal. However, the Redskins replied with Gano hitting a 40-yard field goal. The Titans scored with Bironas nailing a 40-yard field goal, but the Redskins replied again with Gano making a 42-yard field goal. The decision was made at Overtime after Gano successfully hit a 48-yard field goal to give the Titans the loss, settling the records for both teams at 5–5 and the Titans' 14-game winning streak against NFC Opponents was snapped.

During the game, Vince Young suffered a torn flexor tendon in his right thumb. He was replaced by Rusty Smith. Young was held out of the game after he was prepared to reenter. Following the game, Young threw his shoulder pads into the crowd as he left the field, had an altercation with Coach Fisher in the locker room and stormed out. Fisher then declared that Smith was the Titans' starting quarterback.

==== Week 12: at Houston Texans ====
Week 12: Tennessee Titans at Houston Texans – Game summary

Quarter	1	2	3	4	Total
Titans	0	0	0	0	0
Texans	0	14	3	3	20

at Reliant Stadium, Houston, Texas

- Date: November 28
- Game time: 12:00 p.m. CST
- Game weather: 58 °F (14 °C) (Mostly Cloudy)
- Game attendance: 70,855
- Referee: Clete Blakeman
- TV announcers (CBS): Ian Eagle and Dan Fouts
- Recap

Game information

First quarter

- No scoring plays.

Second quarter

- HOU – Joel Dreessen 1-yard pass from Matt Schaub (Neil Rackers kick). Texans 7–0. Drive: 4 plays, 25 yards, 2:02.
- HOU – Andre Johnson 2-yard pass from Matt Schaub (Neil Rackers kick). Texans 14–0. Drive: 9 plays, 71 yards, 5:06.

Third quarter

- HOU – Neil Rackers 35-yard field goal. Texans 17–0. Drive: 11 plays, 49 yards, 5:24.

Fourth quarter

- HOU – Neil Rackers 33-yard field goal. Texans 20–0. Drive: 14 plays, 80 yards, 8:27.

Top passers

- TEN – Rusty Smith – 17/31, 138 yards, 3 INT
- HOU – Matt Schaub – 25/35, 178 yards, 2 TD

Top rushers

- TEN – Javon Ringer – 4 rushes, 27 yards
- HOU – Arian Foster – 30 rushes, 143 yards

Top receivers

- TEN – Justin Gage – 4 receptions, 50 yards
- HOU – Arian Foster – 9 receptions, 75 yards

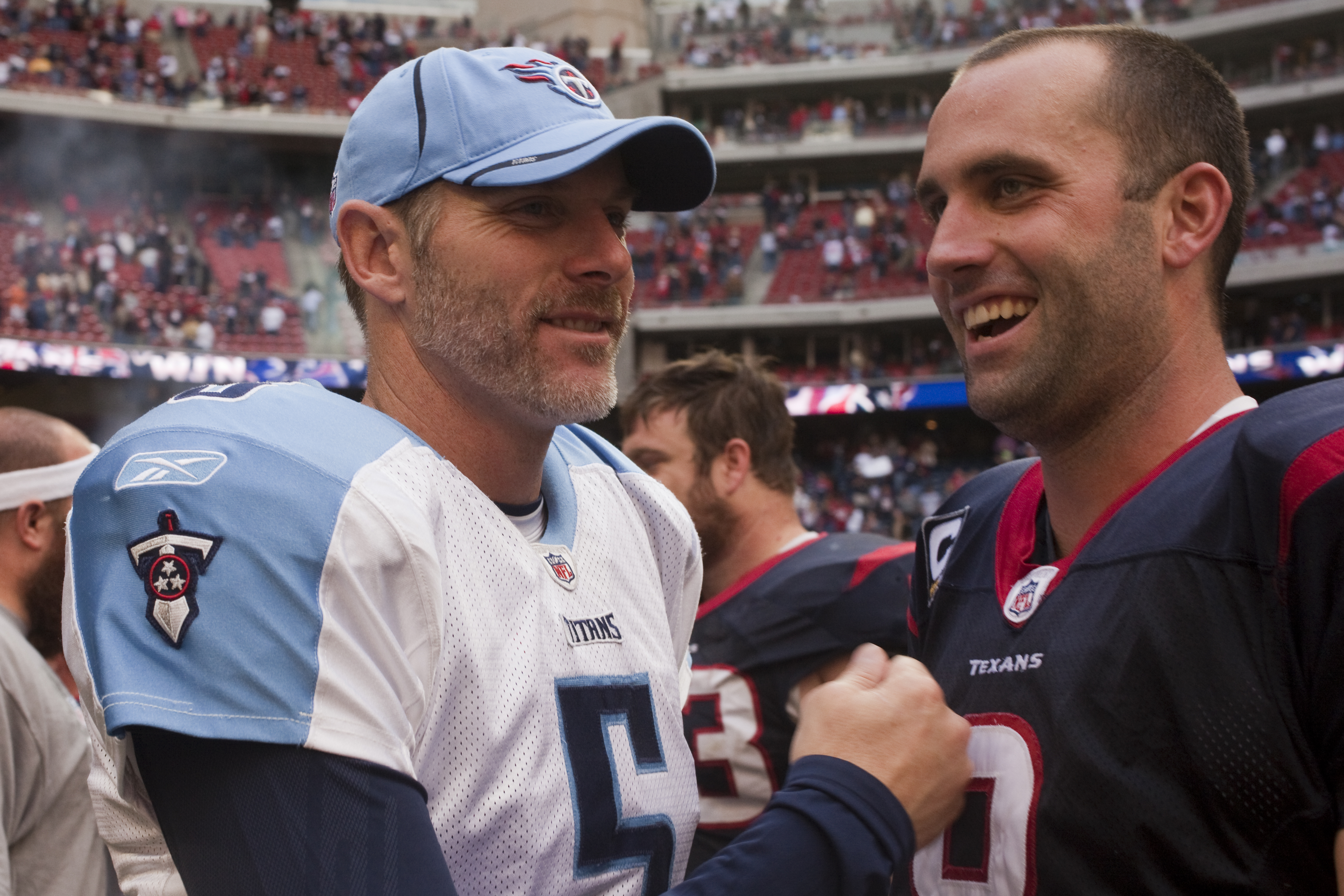
Kerry Collins and Matt Schaub.

In an attempt to break a three-game losing streak the Titans flew to Reliant Stadium for an AFC South rivalry match against the Texans. The Titans trailed throughout the game as QB Matt Schaub got a 1-yard TD pass to TE Joel Dreessen, followed by his 2-yard TD pass to WR Andre Johnson. The lead was increased when kicker Neil Rackers hit a 35 and a 33-yard field goal.

With 7:53 remaining in the 4th quarter, an altercation between Texans WR Andre Johnson and Titans CB Cortland Finnegan broke out, causing both players to be ejected for the rest of the game. Both players' helmets were torn off, then punches were exchanged in return. Despite being ejected, they avoided suspension, but were each fined $25,000 for their actions.

With the shut-out loss, not only did the Titans fall to 5–6, but this also became their 3rd straight season being shut out on the road.

==== Week 13: vs. Jacksonville Jaguars ====
Week 13: Jacksonville Jaguars at Tennessee Titans – Game summary

Quarter	1	2	3	4	Total
Jaguars	7	10	0	0	17
Titans	0	0	3	3	6

at LP Field; Nashville, Tennessee

- Date: December 5
- Game time: 1:00 p.m. EST
- Game weather: 35 °F (2 °C) (Sunny)
- Game attendance: 69,143
- Referee: Ron Winter
- TV announcers (CBS): Gus Johnson and Steve Tasker
- Recap

Game information

First quarter

- JAC – Rashad Jennings 11-yard run (Josh Scobee kick). Jaguars 7–0. Drive: 12 plays, 77 yards, 6:35.

Second quarter

- JAC – David Garrard 4-yard run (Josh Scobee kick). Jaguars 14–0. Drive: 13 plays, 57 yards, 7:33.
- JAC – Josh Scobee 26-yard field goal. Jaguars 17–0. Drive: 9 plays, 49 yards, 2:41.

Third quarter

- TEN – Rob Bironas 37-yard field goal. Jaguars 17–3. Drive: 10 plays, 62 yards, 3:31.

Fourth quarter

- TEN – Rob Bironas 30-yard field goal. Jaguars 17–6. Drive: 13 plays, 49 yards, 6:09.

Top passers

- JAC – David Garrard – 14/19, 126 yards
- TEN – Kerry Collins – 14/32, 169 yards, 2 INT

Top rushers

- JAC – Maurice Jones-Drew – 31 rushes, 186 yards
- TEN – Chris Johnson – 13 rushes, 53 yards

Top receivers

- JAC – Marcedes Lewis – 3 receptions, 36 yards
- TEN – Jared Cook – 4 receptions, 47 yards

Hoping to snap a four-game losing streak the Titans played on home ground for an AFC South rivalry match against the Jaguars. In the first quarter, the Titans trailed early as RB Rashad Jennings got an 11-yard TD run. This was followed in the second quarter by QB David Garrard scrambling 4 yards for a touchdown before kicker Josh Scobee made a 26-yard field goal. The Titans tried to cut this lead but only came away with a 37 and a 30-yard field goal from Rob Bironas giving them a loss.

With the loss, the Titans fell to 5–7.

==== Week 14: vs. Indianapolis Colts ====
Week 14: Indianapolis Colts at Tennessee Titans – Game summary

Quarter	1	2	3	4	Total
Colts	7	14	3	6	30
Titans	0	7	7	14	28

at LP Field, Nashville, Tennessee

- Date: December 9
- Game time: 7:20 p.m. CST
- Game weather: 37 °F (3 °C) (Cloudy)
- Game attendance: 69,143
- Referee: John Parry
- TV announcers (NFLN): Bob Papa, Matt Millen and Joe Theismann
- Recap

Game information

First quarter

- IND – Javarris James 1-yard run (Adam Vinatieri kick). Colts 7–0. Drive: 11 plays, 68 yards, 5:58.

Second quarter

- IND – Pierre Garçon 1-yard pass from Peyton Manning (Adam Vinatieri kick). Colts 14–0. Drive: 10 plays, 59 yards, 4:33.
- IND – Pierre Garçon 19-yard pass from Peyton Manning (Adam Vinatieri kick). Colts 21–0. Drive: 2 plays, 19 yards, 0:08.
- TEN – Chris Johnson 1-yard run (Rob Bironas kick). Colts 21–7. Drive: 7 plays, 55 yards, 1:36.

Third quarter

- TEN – Craig Stevens 7-yard pass from Kerry Collins (Rob Bironas kick). Colts 21–14. Drive: 7 plays, 62 yards, 3:51.
- IND – Adam Vinatieri 21-yard field goal. Colts 24–14. Drive: 8 plays, 77 yards, 3:47.

Fourth quarter

- IND – Adam Vinatieri 28-yard field goal. Colts 27–14. Drive: 16 plays, 64 yards, 7:52.
- TEN – Bo Scaife 4-yard pass from Kerry Collins (Rob Bironas kick). Colts 27–21. Drive: 8 plays, 66 yards, 4:56.
- IND – Adam Vinatieri 47-yard field goal. Colts 30–21. Drive: 6 plays, 46 yards, 1:12.
- TEN – Bo Scaife 2-yard pass from Kerry Collins (Rob Bironas kick). Colts 30–28. Drive: 14 plays, 77 yards, 2:55.

Top passers

- IND – Peyton Manning – 25/35, 319 yards, 2 TD
- TEN – Kerry Collins – 28/39, 244 yards, 3 TD

Top rushers

- IND – Javarris James – 17 rushes, 49 yards, TD
- TEN – Chris Johnson – 22 rushes, 111 yards, TD

Top receivers

- IND – Reggie Wayne – 4 receptions, 106 yards
- TEN – Chris Johnson – 8 receptions, 68 yards

Hoping to snap a five-game losing streak, the Titans stayed at home for a Week 14 AFC South duel with the Indianapolis Colts on Thursday night. Tennessee trailed in the first quarter as Colts running back Javarris James got a 1-yard touchdown run. Indianapolis added onto their lead in the second quarter with quarterback Peyton Manning completing a 1-yard and a 19-yard touchdown pass to wide receiver Pierre Garçon. The Titans answered with a 1-yard touchdown run from running back Chris Johnson.

Tennessee slowly crept back into the game in the third quarter as quarterback Kerry Collins found tight end Craig Stevens on a 7-yard touchdown pass, yet the Colts responded with kicker Adam Vinatieri making a 21-yard field goal. Indianapolis added onto their lead in the fourth quarter with Vinatieri booting a 28-yard field goal. The Titans tried to rally as Collins connected with tight end Bo Scaife on a 4-yard touchdown pass, but the Colts came right back with Vinatieri's 47-yard field goal. Tennessee closed out the game with Collins finding Scaife on a 2-yard touchdown pass.

With the loss, the Titans fell to 5–8.

==== Week 15: vs. Houston Texans ====
Week 15: Houston Texans at Tennessee Titans – Game summary

Quarter	1	2	3	4	Total
Texans	0	3	7	7	17
Titans	21	3	7	0	31

at LP Field, Nashville, Tennessee

- Date: December 19
- Game time: 12:00 p.m. CST
- Game weather: 37 °F (3 °C) (Sunny and Cold)
- Game attendance: 69,143
- Referee: Gene Steratore
- TV announcers (CBS): Kevin Harlan and Solomon Wilcots
- Recap

Game information

First quarter

- TEN – Nate Washington 3-yard pass from Kerry Collins (Rob Bironas kick). Titans 7–0. Drive: 9 plays, 60 yards, 4:40.
- TEN – Justin Gage 1-yard pass from Kerry Collins (Rob Bironas kick). Titans 14–0. Drive: 5 plays, 61 yards, 2:13.
- TEN – Chris Johnson 11-yard run (Rob Bironas kick). Titans 21–0. Drive: 6 plays, 44 yards, 2:01.

Second quarter

- HOU – Neil Rackers 37-yard field goal. Titans 21–3. Drive: 12 plays, 38 yards, 5:27.
- TEN – Rob Bironas 30-yard field goal. Titans 24–3. Drive: 4 plays, 10 yards, 0:47.

Third quarter

- HOU – Andre Johnson 12-yard pass from Matt Schaub (Neil Rackers kick). Titans 24–10. Drive: 10 plays, 66 yards, 5:43.
- TEN – Javon Ringer 7-yard run (Rob Bironas kick). Titans 31–10. Drive: 6 plays, 80 yards, 2:46.

Fourth quarter

- HOU – Kevin Walter 4-yard pass from Matt Schaub (Neil Rackers kick). Titans 31–17. Drive: 13 plays, 83 yards, 4:27.

Top passers

- HOU – Matt Schaub – 35/54, 325 yards, 2 TD, INT
- TEN – Kerry Collins – 14/24, 237 yards, 2 TD, INT

Top rushers

- HOU – Arian Foster – 11 rushes, 15 yards
- TEN – Chris Johnson – 24 rushes, 130 yards, TD

Top receivers

- HOU – Kevin Walter – 7 receptions, 70 yards, TD
- TEN – Kenny Britt – 6 receptions, 128 yards

Hoping to snap a six-game losing streak the Titans played on home ground for an AFC South rivalry rematch against the Texans. The Titans took the lead after QB Kerry Collins threw a 3 and a 1-yard TD pass to WR Nate Washington and to WR Justin Gage. This was followed by RB Chris Johnson getting an 11-yard TD run. The Texans got on the scoreboard after kicker Neil Rackers made a 37-yard field goal, but the Titans extended their lead after kicker Rob Bironas hit a 30-yard field goal. The lead was narrowed with QB Matt Schaub getting a 12-yard TD pass to WR Andre Johnson, but the Titans pulled away with RB Javon Ringer getting a 7-yard touchdown run. The lead was narrowed again with Schaub throwing a 4-yard TD pass to WR Kevin Walter, but the Titans' defense prevented any more scoring chances.

With the win, the Titans improved to 6–8.

==== Week 16: at Kansas City Chiefs ====
Week 16: Tennessee Titans at Kansas City Chiefs – Game summary

Quarter	1	2	3	4	Total
Titans	0	7	7	0	14
Chiefs	14	17	3	0	34

at Arrowhead Stadium, Kansas City, Missouri

- Date: December 26
- Game time: 12:00 p.m. CST
- Game weather: 19 °F (−7 °C) (Cloudy)
- Game attendance: 65,606
- Referee: Scott Green
- TV announcers (CBS): Bill Macatee and Rich Gannon
- Recap

Game information

First quarter

- KC – Jamaal Charles 14-yard pass from Matt Cassel (Ryan Succop kick). Chiefs 7–0. Drive: 7 plays, 69 yards, 3:41.
- KC – Jamaal Charles 5-yard pass from Matt Cassel (Ryan Succop kick). Chiefs 14–0. Drive: 10 plays, 61 yards, 4:43.

Second quarter

- KC – Ryan Succop 35-yard field goal. Chiefs 17–0. Drive: 9 plays, 46 yards, 3:38.
- KC – Dwayne Bowe 75-yard pass from Matt Cassel (Ryan Succop kick). Chiefs 24–0. Drive: 4 plays, 82 yards, 2:05.
- TEN – Kenny Britt 53-yard pass from Kerry Collins (Rob Bironas kick). Chiefs 24–7. Drive: 1 plays, 53 yards, 0:08.
- KC – Eric Berry 54-yard interception return (Ryan Succop kick). Chiefs 31–7.

Third quarter

- KC – Ryan Succop 42-yard field goal. Chiefs 34–7. Drive: 4 plays, 4 yards, 1:26.
- TEN – Jared Cook 22-yard pass from Kerry Collins (Rob Bironas kick). Chiefs 34–14. Drive: 5 plays, 69 yards, 2:08.

Fourth quarter

- No scoring plays.

Top passers

- TEN – Kerry Collins – 14/37, 235 yards, 2 TD, 2 INT
- KC – Matt Cassel – 24/34, 314 yards, 3 TD

Top rushers

- TEN – Chris Johnson – 14 rushes, 58 yards
- KC – Jamaal Charles – 13 rushes, 77 yards

Top receivers

- TEN – Jared Cook – 5 receptions, 96 yards, TD
- KC – Dwayne Bowe – 6 receptions, 153 yards, TD

Coming off their win over the Texans the Titans flew to Arrowhead Stadium for an AFC duel with the Chiefs. In the first quarter the Titans trailed early as QB Matt Cassel threw a 14 and a 5-yard TD pass to RB Jamaal Charles. This was followed by kicker Ryan Succop nailing a 35-yard field goal, then with Cassel making a 75-yard TD pass to WR Dwayne Bowe. They tried to come back as QB Kerry Collins got a 53-yard TD pass to WR Kenny Britt, but had more problems as Collins' next pass was intercepted by SS Eric Berry and returned 54 yards for a touchdown. This was followed by Succop making a 42-yard field goal. The Titans tried to come back, but came away only with Collins completing a 22-yard TD pass to TE Jared Cook, which wasn't enough for a win.

With the loss, the Titans fell to 6–9 and a guarantee of their first losing season since 2005.

==== Week 17: at Indianapolis Colts ====
Week 17: Tennessee Titans at Indianapolis Colts – Game summary

Quarter	1	2	3	4	Total
Titans	3	3	14	0	20
Colts	3	10	7	3	23

at Lucas Oil Stadium, Indianapolis, Indiana

- Date: January 2
- Game time: 3:15 p.m. CST
- Referee: Ed Hochuli
- TV announcers (CBS): Jim Nantz & Phil Simms

The Titans' final game was an AFC South rivalry rematch against the Colts. In the first quarter the Titans trailed early as kicker Adam Vinatieri made a 48-yard field goal, but they responded as kicker Rob Bironas nailed a 26-yard field goal. The Colts scored again with Vinatieri making a 44-yard field goal, but the Titans re-tied the game with Bironas hitting a 42-yard field goal. The Colts tried to pull away with QB Peyton Manning completing a 7-yard TD pass to WR Reggie Wayne, but the Titans kept the score level as QB Kerry Collins made a 30-yard TD pass to WR Kenny Britt. The Colts still tried to pull away with Manning completing a 30-yard TD pass to WR Pierre Garçon, but the Titans re-tied the game for the fourth time as Collins threw a 15-yard TD pass to RB Chris Johnson. The Colts got away in the fourth quarter as Vinatieri got a 43-yard field goal, giving the Titans a loss and thus ending their season with a 6–10 record.
