= Nate Washington =

American football player (born 1983)

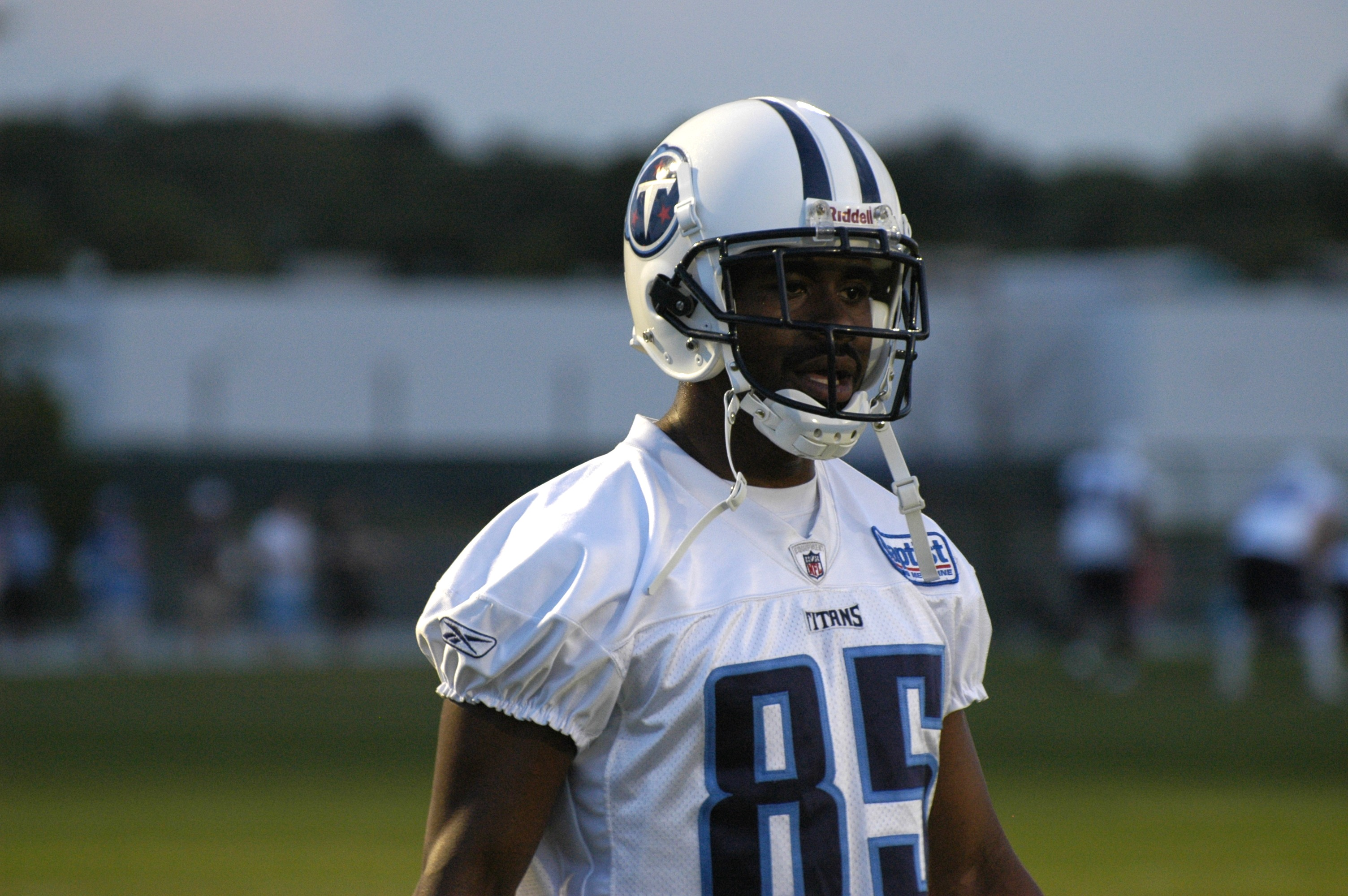
- Washington with the Tennessee Titans in 2009

No. 85
- Position: Wide receiver

Personal information
- Born: August 28, 1983 (age 43); Toledo, Ohio, U.S.
- Listed height: 6 ft 1 in (1.85 m)
- Listed weight: 185 lb (84 kg)

Career information
- High school: Scott (Toledo)
- College: Tiffin (2001–2004)
- NFL draft: 2005: undrafted

Career history
- Pittsburgh Steelers (2005–2008); Tennessee Titans (2009–2014); Houston Texans (2015); New England Patriots (2016)*
- * Offseason or practice squad member only

Awards and highlights
- 2× Super Bowl champion (XL, XLIII)

Career NFL statistics
- Receptions: 458
- Receiving yards: 6,954
- Receiving touchdowns: 44
- Stats at Pro Football Reference

Nate Washington (born August 28, 1983) is an American former professional football player who was a wide receiver in the National Football League (NFL). He played college football for the Tiffin Dragons and was signed by the Pittsburgh Steelers as an undrafted free agent in 2005. Washington played on two Super Bowl-winning teams during four seasons with the Steelers. He then played six seasons for the Tennessee Titans before playing his eleventh and final season for the Houston Texans.

== Early life ==
Washington was raised in Toledo by his single mother, Lisha Washington. Nate attended Scott High School in Toledo, Ohio, where he was named first-team all-area and honorable mention all-state as a senior.

== College career ==
Washington played college football at Tiffin University in Tiffin, Ohio, where he majored in Information Systems. He holds eight individual Dragons' receiving records, including records for receptions in a game (13), yards in a game (299), receptions in a season (70), yards in a season (1,428), touchdowns in a season (16), career receptions (212), career yards (4,214), and career touchdown receptions (47).

== Professional career ==
=== Pittsburgh Steelers ===
Signing with the Pittsburgh Steelers as an undrafted free agent in 2005, Washington became the first Tiffin University player in the modern era to play in the NFL. His first career reception came in the 2005 AFC Championship Game against the Denver Broncos.

He was the Steelers' slot receiver throughout the 2006 season, and started two games after injuries to Hines Ward.

A restricted free agent in the 2008 offseason, Washington resigned a one-year, $1.417 million tender offer on April 16, 2008. In Super Bowl XLIII, Washington had one catch for 11 yards on his way to winning his second career Super Bowl ring.

=== Tennessee Titans ===
Washington signed a six-year, $27 million deal with the Tennessee Titans on March 2, 2009.

In the 2011 season, Titans top receiver Kenny Britt tore his medial collateral ligament (MCL) and anterior cruciate ligament (ACL) in the third game against the Denver Broncos, leaving Washington as the number one receiver. Washington finished the year with career highs in receptions (74), yards (1,023), and touchdowns (7) as the Titans finished 9–7, missing the playoffs due to a tiebreaker with the Cincinnati Bengals.

In the 2012 season, the offense as a whole struggled to find any rhythm with quarterback Jake Locker suffering a shoulder injury that affected his play all year and running back Chris Johnson getting off to a slow start. Washington finished the year with a team-leading 746 receiving yards and 4 touchdowns, including a 71-yard touchdown catch from Locker in week 3 against the Detroit Lions.

For the 2013 season, Washington was elected a team captain. In a week 3 game against the San Diego Chargers, he emerged as Locker's favorite target. With the Titans trailing, Washington reportedly led the team in a rally using references from the film 300. With roughly two minutes left on the clock, Washington helped drive the ball 94 yards which resulted in a touchdown pass with 15 seconds left in the game. The Titans won their home opener 20–17 with Washington contributing eight catches for 131 yards. For the season, Washington totaled 58 receptions for 919 yards and three touchdowns.

Through the 2013 season, Washington ranked third among all active undrafted NFL players in career receiving yards behind only Wes Welker and Antonio Gates. He also ranked first among all NFL wide receivers in consecutive games played with 128.

In 2014, in a week 11 game, Washington caught an 80-yard touchdown pass from quarterback Zach Mettenberger against his old team, the Steelers.

=== Houston Texans ===
Washington signed a one-year, $1 million deal with the Houston Texans on April 1, 2015.

=== New England Patriots ===
Washington signed with the New England Patriots on March 24, 2016. On August 24, 2016, the Patriots released Washington.

== NFL career statistics ==
Legend
**Bold**	Career high

=== Regular season ===
Year	Team	Games		Receiving					
Year	Team	GP	GS	Tgt	Rec	Yds	Avg	Lng	TD
2005	PIT	1	0	1	0	0	0.0	0	0
2006	PIT	**16**	2	69	35	624	**17.8**	49	4
2007	PIT	**16**	4	55	29	450	15.5	40	5
2008	PIT	**16**	1	78	40	631	15.8	65	3
2009	TEN	**16**	15	95	47	569	12.1	35	6
2010	TEN	**16**	**16**	94	42	687	16.4	71	6
2011	TEN	**16**	15	**121**	**74**	**1,023**	13.8	57	**7**
2012	TEN	**16**	14	89	46	746	16.2	71	4
2013	TEN	**16**	15	105	58	919	15.8	77	3
2014	TEN	**16**	11	72	40	647	16.2	**80**	2
2015	HOU	14	14	94	47	658	14.0	49	4
Career		159	107	873	458	6,954	15.2	80	44

=== Playoffs ===
Year	Team	Games		Receiving					
Year	Team	GP	GS	Tgt	Rec	Yds	Avg	Lng	TD
2005	PIT	**3**	0	3	1	13	**13.0**	13	0
2007	PIT	1	0	3	1	8	8.0	8	0
2008	PIT	**3**	0	**16**	**7**	**62**	8.9	**18**	0
2015	HOU	1	0	6	1	3	3.0	3	0
Career		8	0	28	10	86	8.6	18	0

== Personal life ==
Washington has two daughters with ex-wife Monique Johnson He gives back to his hometown of Toledo through several charities as well as charity fundraisers that he has founded, along with hosting an annual football camp.

His mother, Lisha, eventually earned an associate degree from the University of Toledo and in 2010 was honored by the nonprofit Mom's House of Toledo. She is a secretary for the Lucas County Board of Developmental Disabilities.
