= Jared Cook =

American football player (born 1987)

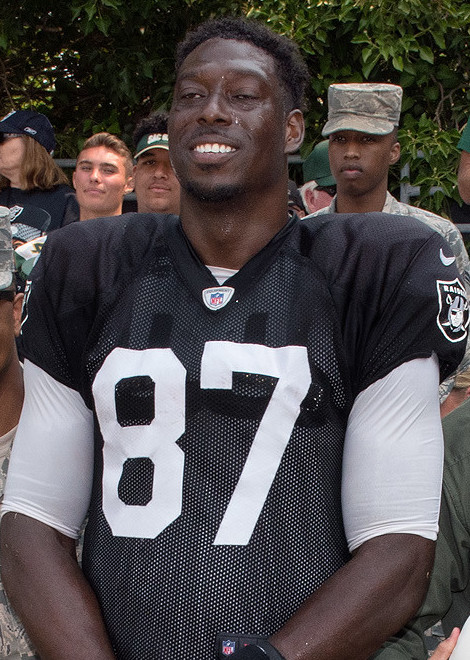
- Cook with the Oakland Raiders in 2018

No. 89, 87
- Position: Tight end

Personal information
- Born: April 7, 1987 (age 39); Birmingham, Alabama, U.S.
- Listed height: 6 ft 5 in (1.96 m)
- Listed weight: 246 lb (112 kg)

Career information
- High school: North Gwinnett (Suwanee, Georgia)
- College: South Carolina (2005–2008)
- NFL draft: 2009: 3rd round, 89th overall pick

Career history
- Tennessee Titans (2009–2012); St. Louis Rams (2013–2015); Green Bay Packers (2016); Oakland Raiders (2017–2018); New Orleans Saints (2019–2020); Los Angeles Chargers (2021)

Awards and highlights
- 2× Pro Bowl (2018, 2019); Second-team All-SEC (2008)

Career NFL statistics
- Receptions: 553
- Receiving yards: 7,237
- Receiving touchdowns: 45
- Stats at Pro Football Reference

Jared Alan Cook (born April 7, 1987) is an American former professional football player who was a tight end in the National Football League (NFL). He played college football for the South Carolina Gamecocks and was selected by the Tennessee Titans in the third round of the 2009 NFL draft. Cook also played for the St. Louis Rams, Green Bay Packers, Oakland Raiders, New Orleans Saints, and Los Angeles Chargers.

== Early life ==
Cook attended North Gwinnett High School in Suwanee, Georgia. While there, he played wide receiver for the Bulldogs high school football team.

== College career ==
Cook played college football at the University of South Carolina under head coach Steve Spurrier. During his career, Cook started 15 of 36 games for the Gamecocks at tight end, recording 73 receptions for 1,107 yards and seven touchdowns.

== Professional career ==
=== Pre-draft ===
Cook entered the 2009 NFL draft and attended the NFL Scouting Combine in Indianapolis, Indiana. He was projected to be a third round pick by NFL draft experts and scouts. At the conclusion of the pre-draft process, Cook was ranked as the fourth best tight end prospect in the draft by NFL draft analyst Mike Mayock.

Pre-draft measurables
Height	Weight	Arm length	Hand span	40-yard dash	10-yard split	20-yard split	20-yard shuttle	Three-cone drill	Vertical jump	Broad jump	Bench press
6 ft 4 3/4 in (1.95 m)	246 lb (112 kg)	35 3/4 in (0.91 m)	10 1/4 in (0.26 m)	4.50 s	1.60 s	2.64 s	4.56 s	7.25 s	41 in (1.04 m)	10 ft 3 in (3.12 m)	23 reps
All values are from NFL Combine/South Carolina's Pro Day

=== Tennessee Titans ===
==== 2009 season ====
The Tennessee Titans selected Cook in the third round (89th overall) of the 2009 NFL draft. The Tennessee Titans traded their second round pick in the 2010 NFL draft to the New England Patriots in order to draft Cook. Cook was the third tight end drafted in 2009. On July 2, 2009, the Titans signed Cook to a four-year, $2.45 million contract that included a signing bonus of $711,000.

Throughout training camp, Cook competed against Alge Crumpler and Craig Stevens for a role as the primary backup tight end. Head coach Jeff Fisher named Cook the fourth tight end on the Titans' depth chart to begin the regular season, behind Bo Scaife, Alge Crumpler, and Craig Stevens.

On September 20, 2009, Cook made his professional debut in the Titans' Week 2 loss to the Houston Texans after being a healthy scratch the previous week. Two weeks later, Cook caught two passes for 11 yards in a 37–17 loss at the Jacksonville Jaguars in Week 4. Cook caught his first NFL reception from quarterback Kerry Collins for a five-yard gain in the third quarter.

Cook finished his rookie season with nine receptions for 74 yards in 14 games and no starts.

==== 2010 season ====
Cook competed against Craig Stevens throughout training camp to be the second tight end on the depth chart after Alge Crumpler departed during free agency. Offensive coordinator Mike Heimerdinger named Cook the third tight end on the depth chart to start the season, behind Bo Scaife and Craig Stevens. On December 19, 2010, Cook earned his first career start after Bo Scaife was benched as a possible result of comments he made about a divided locker room. He finished the Titans 31–17 victory against the Houston Texans with three catches for 42 yards. In the next game, Cook caught five passes for a season-high 96 yards and scored his first NFL touchdown during a 34–14 loss at the Kansas City Chiefs. He caught a 22-yard touchdown reception off a pass by quarterback Kerry Collins in the third quarter to mark his first career touchdown.

Cook appeared in all 16 games and made one start in 2010 while making 29 receptions for 361 yards and a touchdown. He also had a career-high six combined tackles on special teams.

==== 2011 season ====
On January 28, 2011, the Titans fired head coach Jeff Fisher after they finished fourth in the AFC South with a 6–10 record in 2010.

During training camp, Cook competed to be the starting tight end against Craig Stevens after Bo Scaife departed during free agency. Head coach Mike Munchak named Cook the second tight end on the depth chart to start the regular season, behind Craig Stevens.

On October 2, 2011, Cook caught two passes for 93 yards and scored on an 80-yard touchdown reception from quarterback Matt Hasselbeck during a 31–13 victory at the Cleveland Browns. In Week 15, he had a season-high nine catches for 103 yards as the Titans lost at the Indianapolis Colts by a score of 27–13. The following week, Cook caught eight passes for a season-high 169 yards and a touchdown during a 23–17 victory at the Jacksonville Jaguars in Week 16. Cook caught a 55-yard touchdown pass from quarterback Matt Hasselbeck in the first quarter.

Cook appeared in all 16 games and had five starts in 2011 while catching 49 passes for a career-high 759 yards and three touchdowns. He also made five solo tackles while appearing on special teams.

==== 2012 season ====
Cook returned as the secondary tight end behind Craig Stevens in 2012 under offensive coordinator Chris Palmer. On December 9, 2012, Cook caught three passes for 20 yards and a touchdown before exiting during a 27–23 loss at the Indianapolis Colts due to an injury.

Cook finished the 2012 season with 44 receptions for 523 yards and four touchdowns in 13 games and five starts.

During the offseason, Cook requested the Titans to franchise tag him as a wide receiver, which attracts a bigger pay. However, the Titans chose to decline and Cook became an unrestricted free agent. He reportedly received interest from multiple teams, including the Chicago Bears, Cleveland Browns, Miami Dolphins, and St. Louis Rams.

=== St. Louis Rams ===
==== 2013 season ====
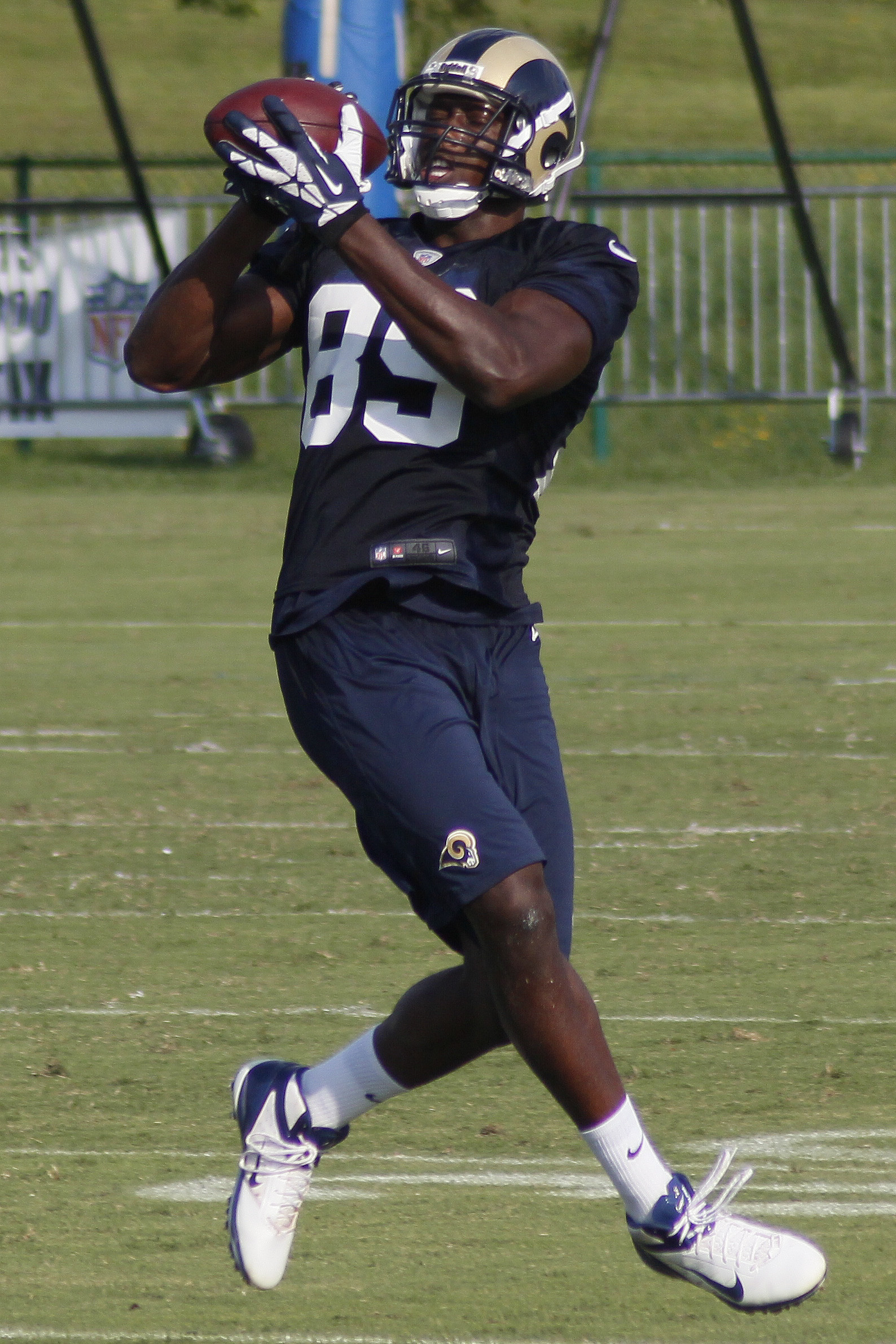
Cook during training camp in 2013

On March 12, 2013, the St. Louis Rams signed Cook to a five-year, $35.1 million contract with $16 million guaranteed where he was reunited with Jeff Fisher.

Cook entered training camp slated as the starting tight end. Head coach Jeff Fisher named Cook the starter to begin the regular season. He made his Rams' debut in their season-opener against the Arizona Cardinals and caught a season-high seven passes for 141 yards and two touchdowns in a 27–24 win. He fumbled a possible touchdown in the first quarter as it was stripped by Tyrann Mathieu and recovered by Karlos Dansby for a touchback. Cook caught his first touchdown of the season on a 13-yard pass from quarterback Sam Bradford during the second quarter.

Cook finished his first season with the Rams with 51 receptions for 671 yards and a career-high five touchdowns in 16 games and 13 starts.

==== 2014 season ====
Cook entered training camp slated as the starting tight end, but saw competition for the role from Lance Kendricks. Offensive coordinator Brian Schottenheimer named Cook the secondary tight end, behind Lance Kendricks.

Cook finished the 2014 season with 52 receptions for 634 yards and three touchdowns in 16 games and six starts.

==== 2015 season ====
Head coach Jeff Fisher named Cook and Lance Kendricks the starting tight ends to start the regular season as the Rams chose to primarily use two-tight end sets. Cook appeared in all 16 games with 12 starts and caught 39 passes for 481 yards and was held without a touchdown reception for the first time since his rookie year. Cook played in 70% of the Rams' offensive snaps and led their tight ends with 672 offensive snaps.

==== 2016 season ====
During the offseason, Cook was expected to be cut by the Rams due to his $8.3 million cap number in 2016. On February 19, 2016, the Rams officially released Cook, freeing $5.69 million in cap space. As an unrestricted free agent, Cook received interest from a few teams and attended a meeting with the Green Bay Packers.

=== Green Bay Packers ===
On March 28, 2016, the Green Bay Packers signed Cook to a one-year, $2.75 million contract with $875,000 guaranteed.

On June 3, 2016, it was reported that Cook underwent foot surgery. The surgery was deemed a preventive measure, and his recovery caused him to miss the majority of training camp. On August 9, Cook returned from injury and fully participated in training camp. His absence significantly delayed his ability to become the primary tight end for the Packers, and he was subsequently named the secondary starting tight end to begin the regular season, behind Richard Rodgers.

On September 25, 2016, Cook caught a pass for a 15-yard gain before exiting in the second quarter of the 34–27 victory over the Detroit Lions after spraining his ankle. Cook was subsequently inactive for the next six games (Weeks 4–10) due to the injury. His injury ended his 51-game streak of consecutive game appearances. On November 20, Cook returned from injury and caught a season-high six passes for 105 yards and a touchdown during a 42–24 loss at the Washington Redskins. During the fourth quarter, Cook caught a six-yard pass from quarterback Aaron Rodgers, but had it stripped away by cornerback Josh Norman.

Cook finished his lone season with the Packers with 30 receptions for 377 yards and a touchdown in 10 games and five starts. The Packers finished atop the NFC North with a 10–6 record and earned a playoff berth. On January 8, 2017, Cook appeared in his first career playoff game and caught five passes for 48 yards during a 38–13 victory over the New York Giants in the NFC Wild Card Round. On January 15, 2017, Cook made six receptions for 103 yards and a touchdown as the Packers defeated the Dallas Cowboys 34–31 in the NFC Divisional Round. During the fourth quarter, Cook caught a 36-yard pass from Aaron Rodgers along the sideline with three seconds left to set up the Packers' game-winning 51-yard field goal by Mason Crosby. The following week, Cook started in the NFC Championship Game and caught seven passes for 78 yards and a touchdown during the 44–21 loss at the Atlanta Falcons.

Cook became an unrestricted free agent after the season ended and began visiting teams after he was unable to agree to terms for a new contract with the Green Bay Packers. He attended meetings with multiple teams, including the Seattle Seahawks, Oakland Raiders, and Minnesota Vikings.

=== Oakland Raiders ===
==== 2017 season ====
On March 16, 2017, the Oakland Raiders signed Cook to a two-year, $10.6 million contract with $5 million guaranteed.

Cook entered training camp slated as the starting tight end, but saw competition from both Clive Walford and Lee Smith. Head coach Jack Del Rio officially named Cook the starting tight end at the start the regular season.

Cook made his Raiders debut in the season-opener against the Tennessee Titans and had five receptions for 56 yards in a 26–16 victory. In Week 3, Cook caught four passes for 43 yards and a touchdown during a 27–10 loss at the Washington Redskins. He caught a 21-yard touchdown pass from quarterback Derek Carr to mark his first touchdown as a Raider. On October 19, Cook caught six passes for 107 yards as the Raiders defeated the Kansas City Chiefs 31–30 on Thursday Night Football. In Week 9, he had eight receptions for a season-high 126 yards during a 27–24 victory against the Miami Dolphins on Sunday Night Football.

Cook started in all 16 games for the first time in his career and made a then career-high 54 receptions for 688 yards and two touchdowns.

==== 2018 season ====
During Monday Night Football against the Los Angeles Rams in Week 1, Cook finished with 180 receiving yards as the Raiders lost by a score of 33–13. His 180 receiving yards are a Raiders' franchise record for a tight end. During a Week 4 45–42 overtime victory over the Cleveland Browns, Cook had eight receptions for 110 yards and two touchdowns. During Week 14 against the Pittsburgh Steelers, he caught seven passes for 116 yards in the 24–21 victory.

Cook finished the 2018 season setting career-highs in receptions (68), receiving yards (896), and touchdowns (6). He was named to his first Pro Bowl after the season concluded as a replacement for Travis Kelce.

=== New Orleans Saints ===
==== 2019 season ====
On March 26, 2019, Cook signed a two-year contract worth $15.5 million with the New Orleans Saints.

Cook made his Saints debut in the season-opener against the Houston Texans in the narrow 30–28 victory. During Week 5 against the Tampa Bay Buccaneers, Cook caught his first receiving touchdown of the season in the 31–24 victory. During Week 12 against the Carolina Panthers, Cook caught six passes for 99 yards and a touchdown in the 34–31 victory. Two weeks later against the San Francisco 49ers, Cook caught two passes for 64 yards, both for touchdowns, but left the eventual narrow 48–46 loss with a head injury. He was later diagnosed with a concussion and was ruled out for the rest of the game. During Week 16 against the Tennessee Titans, Cook caught three passes for 84 yards and two touchdowns in the 38–28 road victory.

Cook finished the 2019 season with 43 receptions for 705 yards and a career-high nine touchdowns in 14 games and seven starts. He earned a second consecutive Pro Bowl nomination.

==== 2020 season ====
During Week 2 against his former team, the Las Vegas Raiders, on Monday Night Football, Cook caught his first touchdown of the season in the 34–24 loss. Cook finished the 2020 season with 37 receptions for 504 yards and seven touchdowns in 15 games and five starts.

On March 3, 2021, Cook was released by the Saints.

=== Los Angeles Chargers ===
On March 18, 2021, the Chargers signed Cook to a one-year, $6 million contract with $4.5 million guaranteed. He finished the 2021 season with 48 receptions for 564 yards and four touchdowns in 16 games and 10 starts.

== Career statistics ==
=== NFL ===
==== Regular season ====
Year	Team	Games		Receiving					Rushing					Fumbles	
Year	Team	GP	GS	Rec	Yds	Avg	Lng	TD	Att	Yds	Avg	Lng	TD	Fum	Lost
2009	TEN	14	0	9	74	8.2	17	0	—	—	—	—	—	0	0
2010	TEN	16	1	29	361	12.4	36	1	—	—	—	—	—	0	0
2011	TEN	16	5	49	759	15.5	80T	3	—	—	—	—	—	2	2
2012	TEN	13	5	44	523	11.9	61T	4	—	—	—	—	—	1	1
2013	STL	16	13	51	671	13.2	47	5	—	—	—	—	—	1	1
2014	STL	16	6	52	634	12.2	59T	3	1	0	0.0	0	0	0	0
2015	STL	16	12	39	481	12.3	49	0	—	—	—	—	—	2	1
2016	GB	10	5	30	377	12.6	47	1	—	—	—	—	—	1	1
2017	OAK	16	16	54	688	12.7	35	2	—	—	—	—	—	1	1
2018	OAK	16	14	68	896	13.2	45	6	—	—	—	—	—	0	0
2019	NO	14	7	43	705	16.4	61T	9	—	—	—	—	—	0	0
2020	NO	15	5	37	504	13.6	46	7	—	—	—	—	—	1	1
2021	LAC	16	10	48	564	11.8	42	4	—	—	—	—	—	0	0
Total		194	99	553	7,237	13.1	80T	45	1	0	0.0	0	0	9	8

==== Postseason ====
Year	Team	Games		Receiving					Rushing					Fumbles	
Year	Team	GP	GS	Rec	Yds	Avg	Lng	TD	Att	Yds	Avg	Lng	TD	Fum	Lost
2016	GB	3	3	18	229	12.7	35	2	—	—	—	—	—	0	0
2019	NO	1	0	5	54	10.8	14	0	—	—	—	—	—	0	0
2020	NO	2	2	9	68	7.6	12	0	—	—	—	—	—	1	1
Total		6	5	32	351	11.0	35	2	0	0	0.0	0	0	1	1

=== College ===
Year	G	Receiving			
Year	G	Rec	Yds	Avg	TD
2006	11	6	113	18.8	1
2007	12	30	421	14.0	3
2008	13	37	573	15.5	3
Career	36	73	1,107	15.2	7
