= Kenny Britt =

American football player (born 1988)

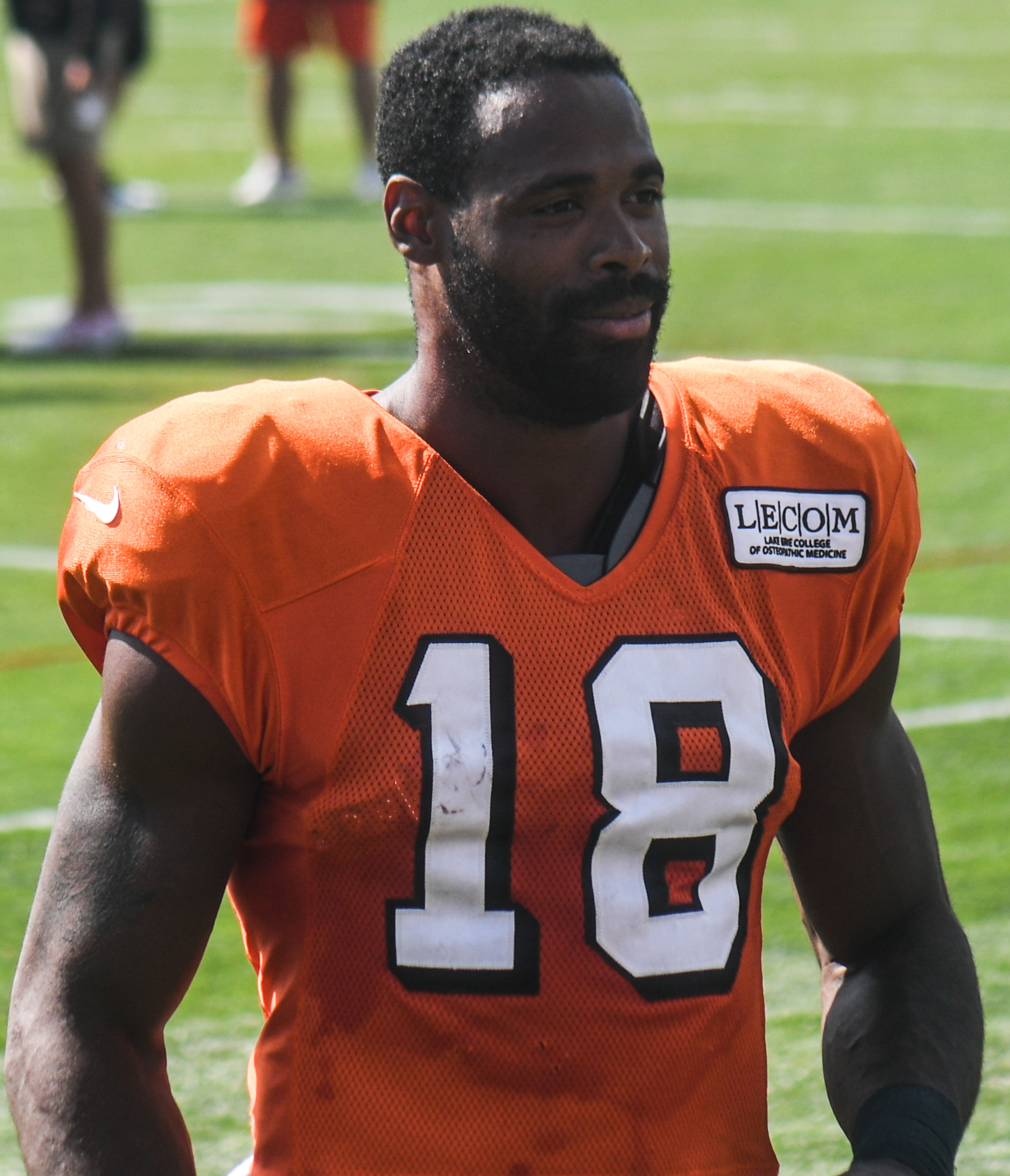
- Britt with the Cleveland Browns in 2017

No. 18, 81, 85
- Position: Wide receiver

Personal information
- Born: September 19, 1988 (age 38); Bayonne, New Jersey, U.S.
- Listed height: 6 ft 3 in (1.91 m)
- Listed weight: 230 lb (104 kg)

Career information
- High school: Bayonne
- College: Rutgers (2006–2008)
- NFL draft: 2009: 1st round, 30th overall pick

Career history
- Tennessee Titans (2009–2013); St. Louis / Los Angeles Rams (2014–2016); Cleveland Browns (2017); New England Patriots (2017)

Awards and highlights
- Third-team All-American (2008); First-team All-Big East (2008); Second-team All-Big East (2007)

Career NFL statistics
- Receptions: 329
- Receiving yards: 5,137
- Receiving touchdowns: 32
- Stats at Pro Football Reference

Kenneth Lawrence Britt (born September 19, 1988) is an American former professional football player who was a wide receiver in the National Football League (NFL). He played college football for the Rutgers Scarlet Knights and was selected by the Tennessee Titans with the 30th overall pick in the 2009 NFL draft. He has also played for the St. Louis / LA Rams, Cleveland Browns and New England Patriots.

== Early life ==
Kenneth Lawrence Britt was born on September 19, 1988, in Bayonne, New Jersey. He attended Bayonne High School.

== College career ==
Britt during his tenure at Rutgers

Ranked a four-star prospect by Rivals.com, Britt spurned numerous suitors to stay home at his home-state university, Rutgers University. Prior to National Signing Day, there were strong rumors that he would commit to Illinois but he chose to attend Rutgers instead.

Britt was pressed into the starting lineup as a true freshman in 2006. That season, he had a major role in one of the biggest wins in school history, which was the 28–25 victory over Louisville. On December 2, against West Virginia, he had ten receptions for 119 receiving yards. He finished the 2006 season with 29 receptions for 440 receiving yards and two receiving touchdowns.

Britt continued his stellar play in the 2007 season. On September 15, against Norfolk State, he had four receptions for 121 yards and two touchdowns. On October 13, he had six receptions for 176 yards and a touchdown against Syracuse. On November 3, against Connecticut, he had eight receptions for 122 receiving yards. On November 29, against Louisville, he had 12 receptions for 173 yards and two touchdowns. In the International Bowl against Ball State, he had six receptions for 125 yards and a touchdown in the 52–30 victory. In the 2007 season, Britt totaled 62 receptions for 1,232 yards and eight touchdowns, averaging 19.9 yards per catch. Britt led all sophomores in Division I-A football in receiving yards and yards per reception, finishing 11th and 5th in those categories respectively for all of I-A. Britt also led the Big East conference in both categories in 2007, and was rewarded with a spot on the Big East's All-Conference team.

Coming into the 2008 season, Britt was named to the preseason All-Big East teams by numerous publications, including Phil Steele and Athlon Sports. NationalChamps.net named Britt an honorable mention All-American.

On September 11, Britt had eight receptions for 109 yards against North Carolina. On October 4, against West Virginia, he had 12 receptions for 151 yards. On October 25, against Pittsburgh, he had five receptions for 143 yards and three touchdowns. On November 15, against South Florida, he had eight receptions for 173 yards and a touchdown. On November 22, against Army, he had ten receptions for 197 yards. In the PapaJohns.com Bowl against NC State, he had six receptions for 119 yards and a touchdown in the 29–23 victory. Britt led the Big East in receiving yards for the second consecutive season.

Britt was named to the 2008 Associated Press Third-team All-America. Britt was a selection for First-team All-Big East in 2008.

On January 3, 2009, Britt announced he would forgo his senior season at Rutgers University and declare himself eligible for the 2009 NFL Draft.

== Professional career ==
=== Pre-draft ===
Britt had a solid NFL Combine performance, running a 4.56 40-yard dash, lifting 23 reps of 225 lbs on bench press, displaying a 37-inch vertical leap, 124.0 inch broad jump, and the 20-yard shuttle in 4.47 seconds. Britt improved his time on his 03/23/09 pro day by running a 4.47 40-yard dash.

Pre-draft measurables
Height	Weight	Arm length	Hand span	40-yard dash	10-yard split	20-yard split	20-yard shuttle	Vertical jump	Broad jump	Bench press	Wonderlic
6 ft 2 7/8 in (1.90 m)	218 lb (99 kg)	34 in (0.86 m)	9 in (0.23 m)	4.56 s	1.63 s	2.71 s	4.47 s	37.0 in (0.94 m)	10 ft 4 in (3.15 m)	23 reps	21
All values from NFL Combine

=== Tennessee Titans ===
The Tennessee Titans selected Britt in the first round (30th overall) of the 2009 NFL draft. He became the first player selected in the first round of the NFL draft from Rutgers and surpassed 1996 second-round pick (39th overall) Marco Battaglia as the highest draft pick in school history until the following year, when Anthony Davis (offensive tackle, born 1989) (11th overall) and Devin McCourty (27th overall) both surpassed him when they both were selected in the first-round of the 2010 NFL draft.

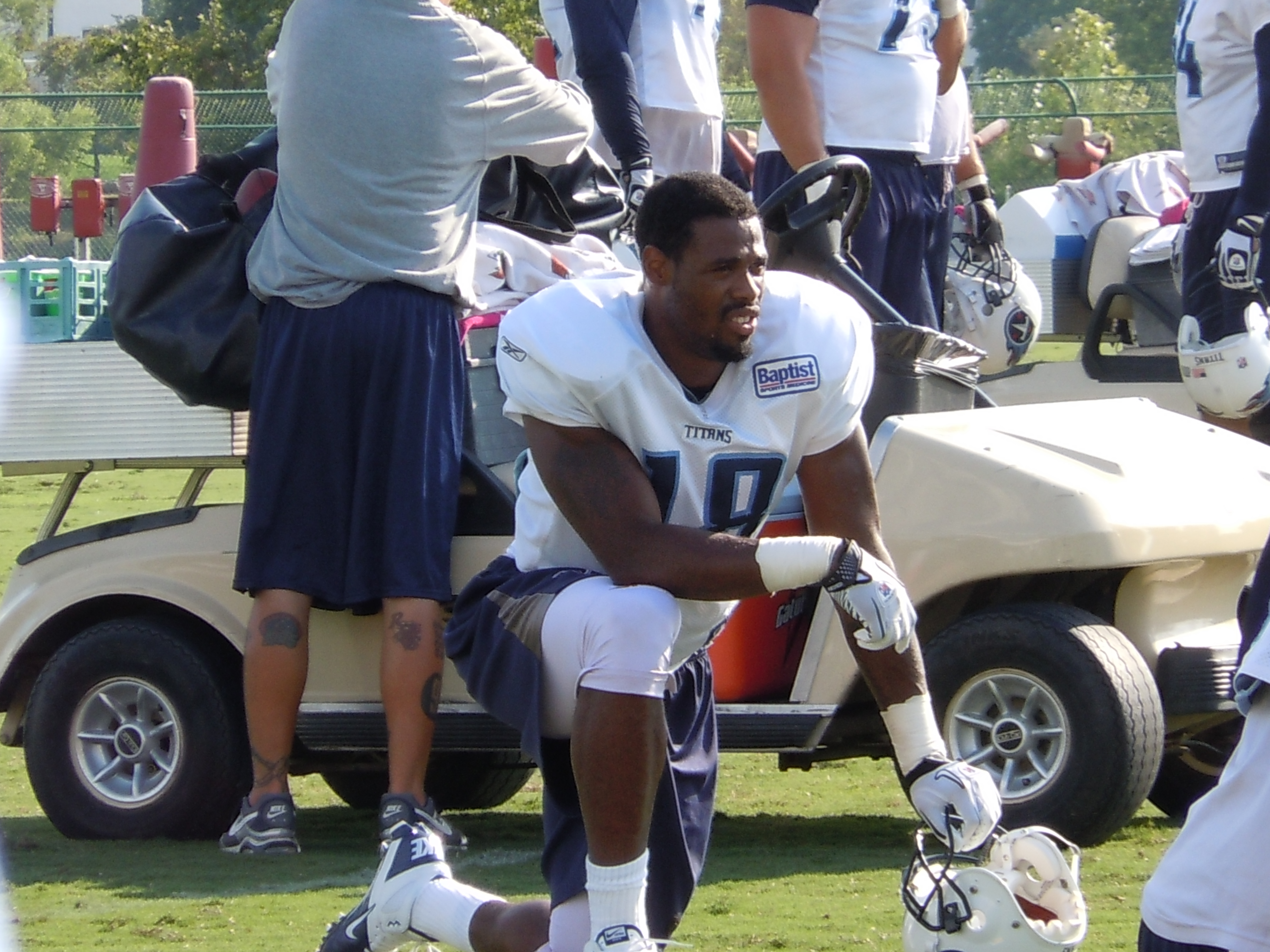
Britt at Tennessee Titans training camp in 2010

His first game against the Pittsburgh Steelers was solid as he caught four passes for 85 yards, including a 57-yard reception in a 13–10 loss. He scored his first touchdown on the receiving end of a Vince Young pass on November 23, 2009, against the Houston Texans in Week 11. On November 29, 2009, in Week 12, Britt caught a ten-yard game-winning touchdown pass in the back of the endzone from Young as time was expiring during a 20–17 victory over the Arizona Cardinals. He had seven receptions for 128 yards for the game He finished his rookie season with 42 receptions for 701 receiving yards and three receiving touchdowns.

On October 24, 2010, Kenny caught seven passes, three touchdowns and gained 225 yards in a 37–19 victory over the Philadelphia Eagles. Britt recorded the most receiving yards in a game against the Eagles. He finished the 2010 season with 42 receptions for 775 receiving yards and nine receiving touchdowns in 12 games.

During the Titans' Sunday, September 25, 2011, game against the Denver Broncos, Britt tore his medial collateral ligament (MCL) and anterior cruciate ligament (ACL) while dodging a hit from free safety Rahim Moore. On September 28, the team placed Britt on its Injured reserve list.

Britt was suspended for the first game of the 2012 season due to numerous incidents involving police. In Week 14, against the Indianapolis Colts, he had eight receptions for 143 receiving yards in the 27–23 loss. In the 2012 season, Britt finished with 45 receptions for 589 receiving yards and four receiving touchdowns.

In the 2013 season, Britt appeared in 12 games and finished with 11 receptions for 96 receiving yards.

=== St. Louis / Los Angeles Rams ===
On March 31, 2014, Britt signed a one-year deal with the St. Louis Rams. The contract was worth $1.4 million with $550,000 guaranteed on the condition that he made the Rams 53-man roster. In Week 11, against the Denver Broncos, he had four receptions for 128 receiving yards and one receiving touchdown. In the 2014 season, Britt finished with 48 receptions for 748 receiving yards and three receiving touchdowns.

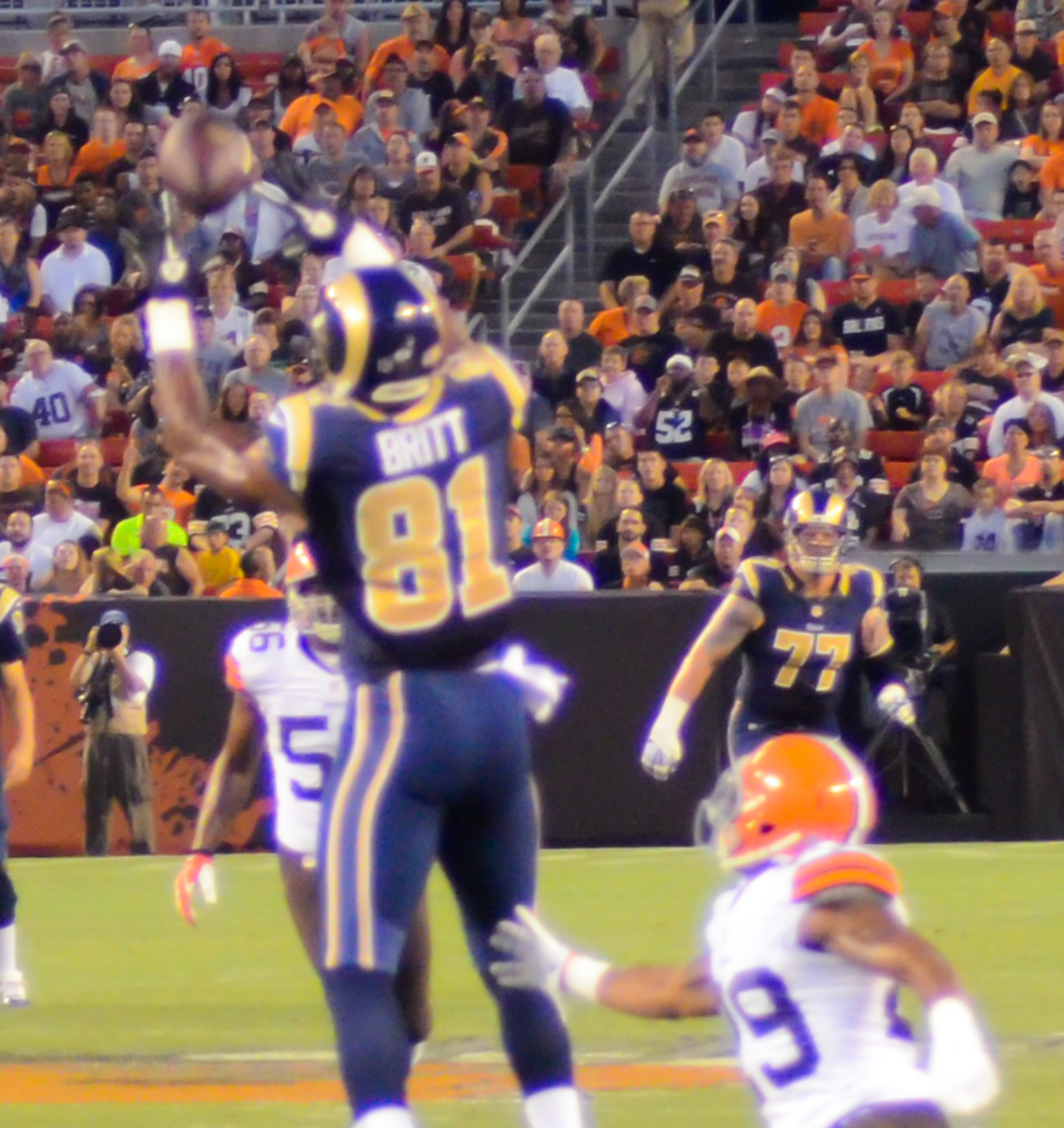
Britt with the St. Louis Rams in 2014

Britt re-signed with the Rams on a two-year, $9.125 million contract on March 13, 2015. In the 2015 season, he had 36 receptions for 681 receiving yards and three receiving touchdowns.

In Week 6 of the 2016 season, Britt had seven receptions for 136 receiving yards and two receiving touchdowns in the 31–28 loss to the Detroit Lions. In the 2016 season, Britt became the first Rams wide receiver to reach 1,000 yards since Torry Holt in 2007. He finished the 2016 season with 68 receptions for 1,002 receiving yards and five receiving touchdowns.

=== Cleveland Browns ===
On March 9, 2017, Britt signed a four-year, $32.5 million contract with the Cleveland Browns. Britt's effort and commitment to play football came into question throughout the entire season. After recording just 18 catches in nine games, he was released by the Browns on December 8, 2017. It was also reported that Britt requested his release.

=== New England Patriots ===
On December 13, 2017, Britt signed a two-year contract with the New England Patriots. Britt finished the 2017 season with 20 receptions for 256 receiving yards and two receiving touchdowns. The team went on to Super Bowl LII where they lost to the Philadelphia Eagles 41–33. Britt was inactive for the Super Bowl. On March 6, 2018, the Patriots decided to pick up Britt's second-year option, retaining him for the 2018 season. Britt was released by the Patriots on August 22, 2018.

== Career statistics ==
=== NFL ===
Year	Team	Games		Receptions						
Year	Team	GP	GS	Rec	Yds	Avg	Lng	TD	R/G	Y/G
2009	TEN	16	6	42	701	16.7	57	3	2.6	43.8
2010	TEN	12	7	42	775	18.5	80	9	3.5	64.6
2011	TEN	3	3	17	289	17.0	80	3	5.7	96.3
2012	TEN	14	11	45	589	13.1	46	4	3.2	42.1
2013	TEN	12	3	11	96	8.7	15	0	0.9	8.0
2014	STL	16	13	48	748	15.6	63	3	3.0	46.8
2015	STL	16	13	36	681	18.9	60	3	2.3	42.6
2016	LA	15	15	68	1,002	14.7	66	5	4.5	66.8
2017	CLE	9	4	18	233	12.9	38	2	2.0	25.9
2017	NE	3	0	2	23	11.5	16	0	0.7	7.7
Career		116	75	329	5,137	15.6	80	32	2.8	44.3

=== College ===
Season	Team	GP	Receiving				Rushing			
Season	Team	GP	Rec	Yds	Avg	TD	Att	Yds	Avg	TD
2006	Rutgers	9	29	440	15.2	2	0	0	0.0	0
2007	Rutgers	13	62	1,232	19.9	8	0	0	0.0	0
2008	Rutgers	12	87	1,371	15.8	7	7	75	10.7	1
Career		34	178	3,043	17.1	17	7	75	10.7	1

== Personal life ==
He is married to Sabrina Britt and he has four sons and three daughters.

On April 12, 2011, Britt was arrested in New Jersey on three counts (including a felony) following an alleged car chase with police. The charges were later reduced. On June 7, Britt pleaded guilty to careless driving and was fined. On June 8, 2012, Britt was arrested in Hoboken, New Jersey, charged with resisting arrest.

In 2012, Britt was arrested for DUI at Fort Campbell, Kentucky. In 2013, he was found not guilty.
