= Bo Scaife =

American football player (born 1981)

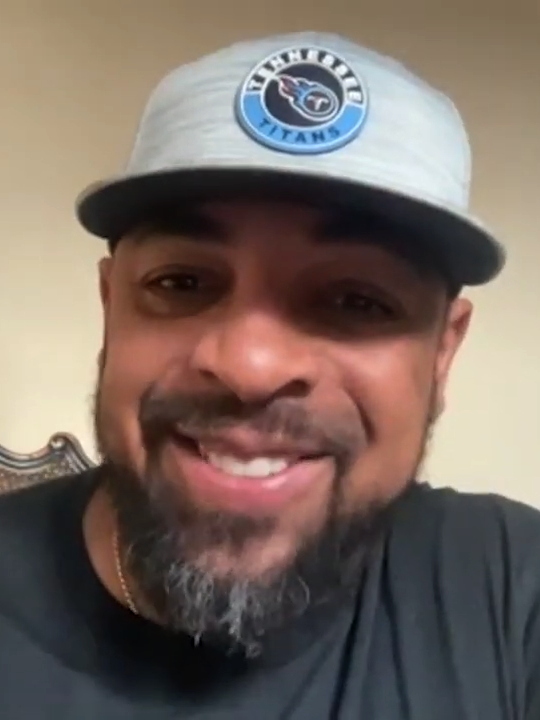
- Scaife in 2023

No. 80, 83
- Position: Tight end

Personal information
- Born: January 6, 1981 (age 45); Denver, Colorado, U.S.
- Listed height: 6 ft 3 in (1.91 m)
- Listed weight: 249 lb (113 kg)

Career information
- High school: Mullen (Denver)
- College: Texas (1999–2004)
- NFL draft: 2005: 6th round, 179th overall pick

Career history
- Tennessee Titans (2005–2010); Cincinnati Bengals (2011); New England Patriots (2012)*
- * Offseason or practice squad member only

Awards and highlights
- First-team All-Big 12 (2004); NFL record: Only TE in NFL history to have a rushing TD, receiving TD, kickoff return, and tackle in the same season

Career NFL statistics
- Receptions: 251
- Receiving yards: 2,383
- Receiving touchdowns: 12
- Stats at Pro Football Reference

Oliver Edward "Bo" Scaife, III (born January 6, 1981) is an American former professional football player who was a tight end in the National Football League (NFL). He played college football for the Texas Longhorns and was selected by the Tennessee Titans in the sixth round of the 2005 NFL draft.

== Early life ==
Scaife attended Mullen High School in Denver, Colorado with fellow NFL tight end Alex Smith and J.D. Chism. He earned Parade All-American, Gatorade Circle of Champions Colorado Player of the Year, Rocky Mountain News Colorado Offensive Player of the Year and second-team All-USA honors at tight end by USA Today as a senior. Also two-time first-team Colorado 5A All-State selection by Denver Post. Scaife led his team to Colorado 5A state title as a senior, while catching 62 passes for 1,400 yards and 19 touchdowns and rushing for 250 yards on 20 carries and one touchdown.

== College career ==
He played college football at the University of Texas from 1999 to 2004, and was a sixth year senior after missing both the 2000 and 2002 seasons due to ACL injuries. As a sophomore, he was an All-Big 12 honorable mention, and in his last year, he won first-team All-Big 12 Selection. Scaife finished his career with 75 receptions for 997 yards (13.3 yards per rec.), and five touchdowns. He graduated with an education degree in December 2004.

== Professional career ==
Pre-draft measurables
Height	Weight	Arm length	Hand span	40-yard dash	10-yard split	20-yard split	20-yard shuttle	Three-cone drill	Vertical jump	Broad jump	Bench press
6 ft 2 5/8 in (1.90 m)	249 lb (113 kg)	32 3/8 in (0.82 m)	10 1/8 in (0.26 m)	4.82 s	1.67 s	2.77 s	4.12 s	7.21 s	32.5 in (0.83 m)	9 ft 6 in (2.90 m)	24 reps
All values from NFL Combine

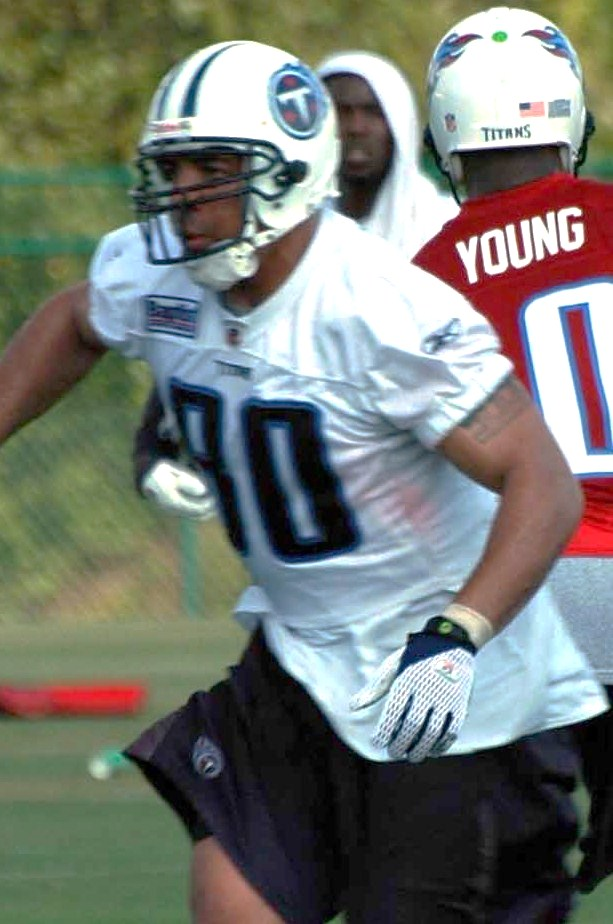
Scaife at training camp with the Titans in 2008

=== Tennessee Titans ===
Playing for the Titans, Scaife had a productive rookie campaign. Despite being the third-string tight end, he managed to catch 37 passes for 273 yards and 2 touchdowns.

With the Titans selecting Vince Young with the 3rd overall pick in the 2006 NFL draft, Scaife was reunited with his good friend and former Longhorns teammate. In December 2006, Scaife was sidelined by an ankle injury and rookie tight end Cooper Wallace was signed to provide depth at the position.

In 2007 Bo Scaife came in 3rd on the team with 46 catches 421 yards and 1 touchdown.

Bo Scaife is the only tight end in NFL history to rush for a touchdown, catch a touchdown, return a kickoff, and record a tackle in the same season.

On February 28, 2008, the Titans gave Scaife a second-round tender for a one-year deal. He was re-signed on April 2.

Scaife appears with Vince Young as part of Reebok's NFL "Join the Migration" commercial.

On February 19, 2009, the Titans placed their franchise tag on Scaife. On April 27, Scaife signed the franchise tag tender, worth $4.46 million for the 2009 season.

=== Cincinnati Bengals ===
After becoming a free agent following the 2010 season, Scaife signed with the Cincinnati Bengals on August 5, 2011.

=== New England Patriots ===
On June 7, 2012, Scaife signed with the New England Patriots. He was released on June 18.

== NFL career statistics ==
Legend
**Bold**	Career high

=== Regular season ===
Year	Team	Games		Receiving					
Year	Team	GP	GS	Tgt	Rec	Yds	Avg	Lng	TD
2005	TEN	**16**	5	56	37	273	7.4	19	2
2006	TEN	14	12	56	29	370	**12.8**	34	2
2007	TEN	**16**	**15**	78	46	421	9.2	26	1
2008	TEN	**16**	7	**84**	**58**	**561**	9.7	**44**	2
2009	TEN	14	10	70	45	440	9.8	27	1
2010	TEN	14	13	52	36	318	8.8	30	**4**
		90	62	396	251	2,383	9.5	44	12

=== Playoffs ===
Year	Team	Games		Receiving					
Year	Team	GP	GS	Tgt	Rec	Yds	Avg	Lng	TD
2008	TEN	**1**	**1**	**7**	**4**	**23**	**5.8**	**14**	0
		1	1	7	4	23	5.8	14	0

== Post-career ==
After retiring from football, he returned to school and graduated with an MBA from George Washington University in the spring of 2014. He then launched FreshEdLife.com, a life performance brand aimed at teaching life lessons, skills, tools and resources from professional athletes and other industry professionals.
