= Craig Johnson (American football) =

American football coach (born 1960)

Personal information
- Born: March 3, 1960 (age 66); Rome, New York, U.S.

Career information
- College: Wyoming

Career history
- Wyoming (1983) Graduate assistant; Arkansas (1984) Graduate assistant; Army (1985) Running backs coach; Rutgers (1986–1988) Running backs coach; VMI (1989–1991) Offensive coordinator; Northwestern (1992–1996) Quarterbacks coach; Maryland (1997–1999) Quarterbacks coach; Maryland (1997–1998) Offensive coordinator; Tennessee Titans (2000–2001) Offensive assistant & quality control coach; Tennessee Titans (2002–2009) Quarterbacks coach; Tennessee Titans (2010) Running backs coach; Minnesota Vikings (2011–2013) Quarterbacks coach; New York Giants (2014–2019) Running backs coach; Maryland (2020–2021) Senior Analyst; Indiana (2022–2023) Associate head coach & running backs coach

Craig Johnson (born March 3, 1960) is an American football coach who was the running backs for the New York Giants of the National Football League (NFL). He was the quarterbacks coach for the Minnesota Vikings from 2011 to 2013. Prior to the Vikings, he was the quarterbacks coach for the Tennessee Titans from 2002 to 2009 and the running backs coach for the 2010 season. He served as an Analyst for the University of Maryland during the 2020 season. On February 7, 2022, Craig Johnson agreed to terms to join Indiana University as their new running back head coach.

== Coaching career ==
=== Wyoming ===
Johnson began his coaching career as a graduate assistant at Wyoming in 1983.

=== Arkansas ===
In 1984, Johnson would move to Arkansas also as a graduate assistant.

=== Army ===
In 1985, Johnson was a part-time assistant coach at Army, tutoring the fullbacks.

=== Rutgers ===
From 1986 to 1988, Johnson served as running backs coach for Rutgers.

=== VMI ===
From 1989 to 1991, Johnson was the offensive coordinator at Virginia Military Institute. Under Johnson, VMI's offense ranked fifth in the nation in total offense in 1990 and first in rushing offense in 1991.

=== Northwestern ===
From 1992 to 1996, Johnson served as the quarterback coach for Northwestern University. At NU, he was part of the first back-to-back Big Ten Conference champions (1995–96) in the school's history. Johnson's quarterback Steve Schnur earned first-team All-Big Ten honors as a senior and posted a career-high 336 passing yards in the 1996 Rose Bowl against USC.

=== Maryland (first stint) ===
From 1997 to 1998, Johnson was the quarterbacks coach at Maryland. He also served as the Terrapins' offensive coordinator for two years (1997–98). In his last year at Maryland, the Terrapins led the Atlantic Coast Conference in rushing offense (235 yards per game avg).

=== Titans ===
In 2000, Johnson landed his first NFL coaching job as an offensive assistant and quality control coach with the Tennessee Titans.

In 2002, Johnson was promoted to quarterbacks coach. As quarterbacks coach, Johnson has developed an NFL co-MVP (Steve McNair, 2003), an NFL Rookie of the Year (Vince Young, 2006) and helped an accomplished veteran recapture his high level of play (Kerry Collins). The quarterback group has totaled six Pro Bowl invitations during his coaching tenure.

In 2010, Johnson was promoted to assistant head coach and running backs coach. That year, Pro Bowler Chris Johnson ran for 1,364 yards and led the team with 44 catches.

=== Vikings ===
From 2011 to 2013, Johnson was the quarterbacks coach for the Minnesota Vikings. In his first year with the Vikings, the team drafted quarterback Christian Ponder. Under Johnson's guidance, Ponder threw for 1,853 yards and 13 touchdowns in 11 games. Ponder also finished the season with eight touchdown passes and only one interception in the red zone, where he had a league-leading 114.3 passer rating.

=== Giants ===
In 2014, Johnson became the running backs coach for the New York Giants. Johnson welcomed two backfield newcomers, Rashad Jennings and rookie Andre Williams, who helped the team average 100.3 rushing yards a game in 2014. In 2015, the Giants welcomed newcomer Shane Vereen to the backfield. Vereen was second on the team in rushing (260 yards on 61 carries), and receiving (59 catches for 494 yards and four touchdowns). The three receiving totals were all career highs. Jennings led the Giants in all three major rushing categories with 195 carries for 863 yards (both career-high totals), and three touchdowns in 2015. In 2018, rookie Saquon Barkley was voted rookie of the year. He had back to back 1,000 seasons under Johnson.

=== Maryland (second stint) ===
Johnson will serve as a Senior Analyst at the University of Maryland Football program for the 2020 season.

=== Indiana ===
In 2022, he became the running backs coach for Indiana.

== Personal life ==
A native of Rome, New York, Johnson grew up in Aurora, Colorado, and earned three letters as a quarterback at Wyoming, throwing for more than 1,100 yards and seven touchdowns as a senior in 1982. Johnson and his wife, Darlene, are parents of two daughters, Shelby and Sydney.
