= Nick Schommer =

American football player (born 1986)

No. 39
- Position: Safety

Personal information
- Born: January 3, 1986 (age 40); Red Wing, Minnesota, U.S.
- Listed height: 6 ft 0 in (1.83 m)
- Listed weight: 201 lb (91 kg)

Career information
- High school: Prescott (WI)
- College: North Dakota State
- NFL draft: 2009: 7th round, 242nd overall pick

Career history
- Tennessee Titans (2009–2010)

Awards and highlights
- Third-team FCS All-American (2008); First-team All-MVFC (2008); First-team All-GWFC (2007)

Career NFL statistics
- Total tackles: 3
- Stats at Pro Football Reference

Nicholas James Schommer (born January 3, 1986) is an American former professional football player who was a safety in the National Football League (NFL). He was selected by the Tennessee Titans in the seventh round of the 2009 NFL draft. He played college football for the North Dakota State Bison.

== College career ==
Schommer attended North Dakota State University after attending Prescott High School in Prescott, Wisconsin. At North Dakota State he was named a FCS third-team All-American.

== Professional career ==
Schommer was selected by the Tennessee Titans in the seventh round (242nd overall) of the 2009 NFL draft, becoming the 25th North Dakota State graduate to be drafted in either the NFL draft or CFL draft. He was waived on September 4. Schommer was then signed to be a member of the practice squad.

After his practice squad contract expired following the 2009 season, Schommer was re-signed to a future contract on January 5, 2010. He was waived by Tennessee on August 29, 2011.
