= 2006 Jacksonville Jaguars season =

12th season in franchise history

- Owner: Wayne Weaver
- General manager: James "Shack" Harris
- Head coach: Jack Del Rio
- Offensive coordinator: Carl Smith
- Defensive coordinator: Mike Smith
- Home stadium: Alltel Stadium

Results
- Record: 8–8
- Division place: 3rd AFC South
- Playoffs: Did not qualify
- All-Pros: DT John Henderson (1st team)
- Pro Bowlers: DT John Henderson; CB Rashean Mathis

Uniform

The 2006 Jacksonville Jaguars season was the franchise's 12th season in the National Football League (NFL) and the 4th under head coach Jack Del Rio. The Jaguars failed to improve on their 12–4 record from 2005. This was the franchise's first year without their star wide receiver Jimmy Smith, as he retired in the offseason. The Jaguars finished in third place in the AFC South and finished the season at 8–8. Although the Jaguars were 8–5 after thirteen games, they lost their next three games in a row and missed the postseason for the second time in three seasons.

== Offseason ==
=== NFL draft ===
2006 Jacksonville Jaguars draft
| Round | Pick | Player | Position | College | Notes |
| 1 | 28 | Marcedes Lewis * | Tight end | UCLA | |
| 2 | 60 | Maurice Jones-Drew * | Running back | UCLA | |
| 3 | 80 | Clint Ingram | Linebacker | Oklahoma | |
| 5 | 160 | Brent Hawkins | Defensive end | Illinois | |
| 7 | 213 | James Wyche | Defensive end | Syracuse | |
| 7 | 236 | Dee Webb | Cornerback | Florida | |
Made roster † Pro Football Hall of Fame * Made at least one Pro Bowl during career

== Staff ==
2006 Jacksonville Jaguars staff
| Front office: Chairman/chief executive officer – Wayne Weaver; Head coaches: Head coach – Jack Del Rio; Assistant head coach/secondary – Dave Campo; Assistant head coach – Mike Tice; Offensive coaches: Offensive coordinator – Carl Smith; Quarterbacks – Ken Anderson; Running backs – Kennedy Polamalu; Wide receivers – Steve Walters; Tight ends – Alfredo Roberts; Offensive line – Andy Heck | Defensive coaches: Defensive coordinator – Mike Smith; Defensive line – Ray Hamilton; Linebackers – Mark Duffner; Defensive backs – Alvin Reynolds; Defensive assistant/assistant defensive line – Ted Monachino; Special teams coaches: Special teams coordinator – Pete Rodriguez; Assistant special teams – Mark Michaels; Strength and conditioning: Strength and conditioning – Mark Asanovich; Assistant strength and conditioning – Les Ebert |

== Final roster ==
2006 Jacksonville Jaguars roster
| Quarterbacks (QB): 9 David Garrard; 5 Quinn Gray; Running backs (RB): 32 Maurice Jones-Drew KR; 24 Montell Owens FB; 23 Alvin Pearman PR; 28 Fred Taylor; 22 LaBrandon Toefield; 36 Derrick Wimbush KR; Wide receivers (WR): 85 Cortez Hankton; 18 Matt Jones; 17 Charles Sharon; 19 Ernest Wilford; 11 Reggie Williams; Tight ends (TE): 80 Kyle Brady; 89 Marcedes Lewis; 87 George Wrighster | Offensive linemen (OL): 69 Khalif Barnes T; 76 Richard Collier T; 67 Vince Manuwai G; 73 Stockar McDougle G/T; 63 Brad Meester C; 65 Chris Naeole G; 62 Dennis Norman C/T; 74 Maurice Williams T; Defensive linemen (DL): 98 John Henderson DT; 93 Bobby McCray DE; 96 Tony McDaniel DT; 92 Rob Meier DE/DT; 94 Jeremy Mincey DE; 91 Kenny Pettway DE; 95 Paul Spicer DE; 99 Marcus Stroud DT; 75 Marcellus Wiley DE; 90 James Wyche DE | Linebackers (LB): 58 Jorge Cordova OLB; 50 Tony Gilbert MLB; 56 Nick Greisen OLB; 51 Clint Ingram OLB; 59 Brian Iwuh MLB; 52 Daryl Smith MLB/OLB; Defensive backs (DB): 25 Ahmad Carroll CB; 21 Terry Cousin CB; 42 Jamaal Fudge SS; 37 Deon Grant FS; 27 Rashean Mathis CB; 26 David Richardson FS; 43 Gerald Sensabaugh SS; 31 Scott Starks CB; 23 Dee Webb CB; 29 Brian Williams CB; Special teams (ST): 2 Chris Hanson P; 10 Josh Scobee K; 88 Joe Zelenka LS | Practice squad: 34 DeAndra' Cobb RB; -- Kevis Coley LB; 79 Walter Curry DE/DT; 83 Greg Estandia TE; 72 Ryan Gibbons G; 70 Wayne Hunter T (IR); 30 Jamar Landrom S; 68 Pete McMahon T; 84 Chad Owens WR; Reserve: 61 Dan Connolly C (IR); 20 Donovin Darius S (IR); 57 Brent Hawkins DE (IR); 97 Reggie Hayward DE (IR); 86 Brian Jones TE (IR); 33 Greg Jones FB (IR); 7 Byron Leftwich QB (IR); 78 Elton Patterson DE (IR); 54 Mike Peterson LB (IR); 38 Chris Roberson CB (IR); 41 Nick Sorensen S (IR); 53 Pat Thomas LB (IR); -- Tony Williams DT (IR); Rookies in italics 53 active, 14 reserve, 8 practice squad |

== Preseason ==
| Week | Date | Opponent | Result | Record | Game site |
|---|---|---|---|---|---|
| 1 | August 12 | at Miami Dolphins | W 31–26 | 1–0 | Dolphin Stadium |
| 2 | August 19 | Carolina Panthers | L 10–17 | 1–1 | Alltel Stadium |
| 3 | August 26 | Tampa Bay Buccaneers | W 29–18 | 2–1 | Alltel Stadium |
| 4 | September 1 | at Atlanta Falcons | W 20–17 | 3–1 | Georgia Dome |

== Regular season ==
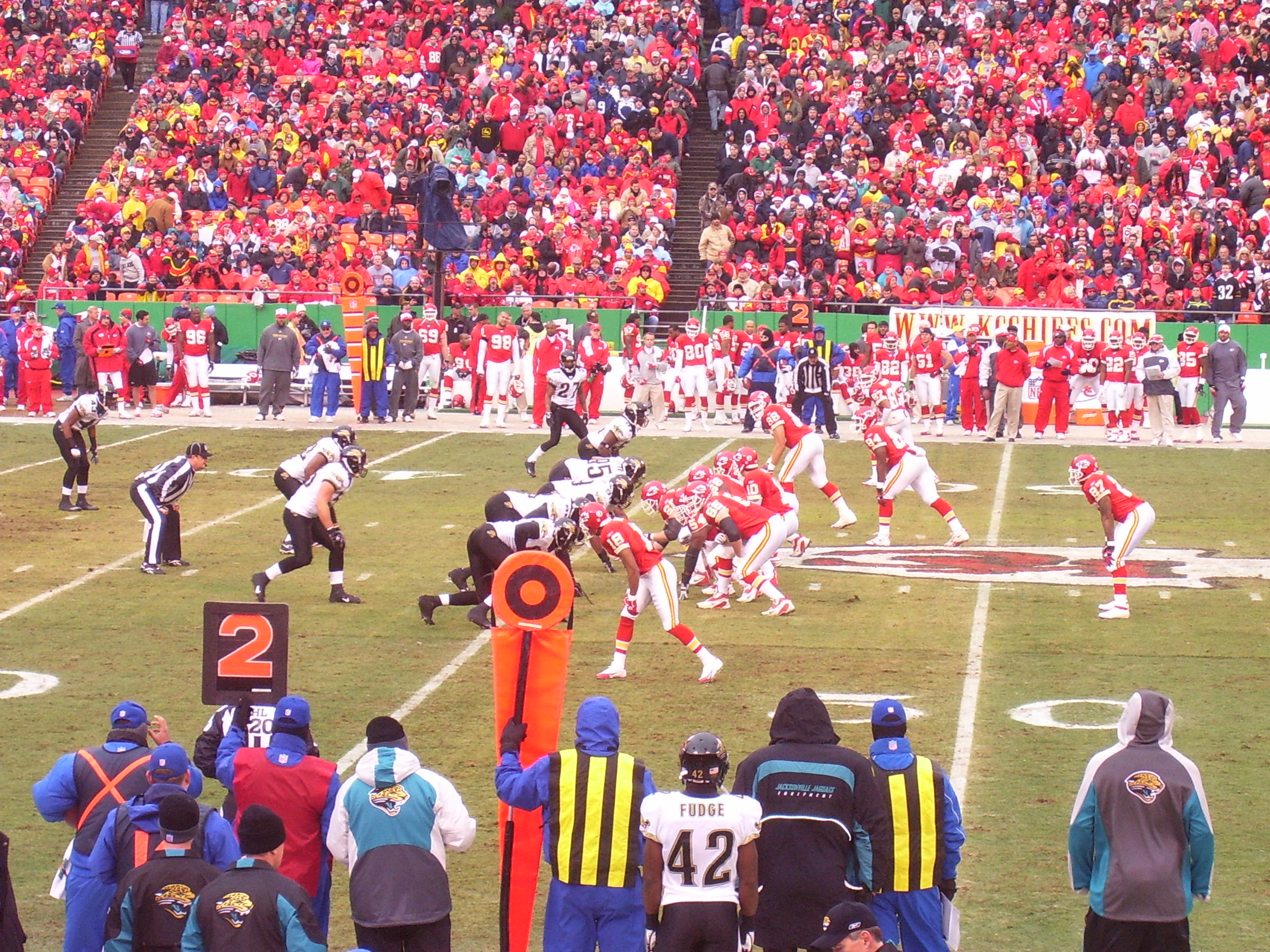
The Jaguars and Chiefs line up, Week 17

=== Schedule ===
| Week | Date | Opponent | Result | Record | Venue | Attendance |
|---|---|---|---|---|---|---|
| 1 | September 10 | Dallas Cowboys | **W** 24–17 | 1–0 | Alltel Stadium | 67,164 |
| 2 | September 18 | Pittsburgh Steelers | **W** 9–0 | 2–0 | Alltel Stadium | 67,164 |
| 3 | September 24 | at **Indianapolis Colts** | **L** 14–21 | 2–1 | RCA Dome | 57,041 |
| 4 | October 1 | at Washington Redskins | **L** 30–36 (OT) | 2–2 | FedEx Field | 89,450 |
| 5 | October 8 | New York Jets | **W** 41–0 | 3–2 | Alltel Stadium | 66,604 |
| 6 | Bye | | | | | |
| 7 | October 22 | at **Houston Texans** | **L** 7–27 | 3–3 | Reliant Stadium | 70,035 |
| 8 | October 29 | at Philadelphia Eagles | **W** 13–6 | 4–3 | Lincoln Financial Field | 69,249 |
| 9 | November 5 | **Tennessee Titans** | **W** 37–7 | 5–3 | Alltel Stadium | 66,524 |
| 10 | November 12 | **Houston Texans** | **L** 10–13 | 5–4 | Alltel Stadium | 65,918 |
| 11 | November 20 | New York Giants | **W** 26–10 | 6–4 | Alltel Stadium | 67,164 |
| 12 | November 26 | at Buffalo Bills | **L** 24–27 | 6–5 | Ralph Wilson Stadium | 63,608 |
| 13 | December 3 | at Miami Dolphins | **W** 24–10 | 7–5 | Dolphin Stadium | 73,160 |
| 14 | December 10 | **Indianapolis Colts** | **W** 44–17 | 8–5 | Alltel Stadium | 67,164 |
| 15 | December 17 | at **Tennessee Titans** | **L** 17–24 | 8–6 | LP Field | 69,134 |
| 16 | December 24 | New England Patriots | **L** 21–24 | 8–7 | Alltel Stadium | 67,164 |
| 17 | December 31 | at Kansas City Chiefs | **L** 30–35 | 8–8 | Arrowhead Stadium | 77,500 |

Note: Intra-division opponents are in bold text.

=== Game summaries ===
==== Week 1: vs. Dallas Cowboys ====
Week One: Dallas Cowboys at Jacksonville Jaguars – Game summary

| Quarter | 1 | 2 | 3 | 4 | Total |
|---|---|---|---|---|---|
| Cowboys | 10 | 0 | 0 | 7 | **17** |
| **Jaguars** | 0 | 10 | 0 | 14 | **24** |

at Alltel Stadium, Jacksonville, Florida

- Date: September 10, 2006
- Game time: 4:15 p.m. EDT
- Game weather: 82 °F (28 °C)
- Game attendance: 67,164
- Referee: Gerry Austin
- TV announcers (Fox): Joe Buck, Troy Aikman, and Pam Oliver
- Recap, Game Book

Game information

**First quarter**

- DAL – Julius Jones 23-yard run (Shaun Suisham kick), 8:06. Cowboys 7–0. **Drive: 8 plays, 70 yards, 3:57.**
- DAL – Shaun Suisham 32-yard field goal, 5:35. Cowboys 10–0. **Drive: 6 plays, 43 yards, 2:03.**

**Second quarter**

- JAX – Josh Scobee 35-yard field goal, 8:48. Cowboys 10–3. **Drive: 10 plays, 63 yards, 4:50.**
- JAX – Reggie Williams 6-yard pass from Byron Leftwich (Josh Scobee kick), 0:07. Tied 10–10. **Drive: 4 plays, 32 yards, 1:26.**

**Third quarter**

- No scoring plays.

**Fourth quarter**

- JAX – Byron Leftwich 3-yard run (Josh Scobee kick), 11:27. Jaguars 17–10. **Drive: 11 plays, 74 yards, 4:58.**
- JAX – Fred Taylor 5-yard run (Josh Scobee kick), 3:13. Jaguars 24–10. **Drive: 5 plays, 40 yards, 2:41.**
- DAL – Terrell Owens 21-yard pass from Drew Bledsoe (Shaun Suisham kick), 1:54. Jaguars 24–17. **Drive: 4 plays, 79 yards, 1:19.**

**Top passers**

- DAL – Drew Bledsoe – 16/33, 246 yards, TD, 3 INT
- JAX – Byron Leftwich – 23/34, 237 yards, TD, INT

**Top rushers**

- DAL – Julius Jones – 17 rushes, 72 yards
- JAX – Fred Taylor – 21 rushes, 74 yards, TD

**Top receivers**

- DAL – Terry Glenn – 4 receptions, 81 yards
- JAX – Matt Jones – 5 receptions, 71 yards

==== Week 2: vs. Pittsburgh Steelers ====
Week Two: Pittsburgh Steelers at Jacksonville Jaguars – Game summary

| Quarter | 1 | 2 | 3 | 4 | Total |
|---|---|---|---|---|---|
| Steelers | 0 | 0 | 0 | 0 | **0** |
| **Jaguars** | 0 | 0 | 3 | 6 | **9** |

at Alltel Stadium, Jacksonville, Florida

- Date: September 18, 2006
- Game time: 8:40 p.m. EDT
- Game weather: 79 °F (26 °C)
- Game attendance: 67,164
- Referee: Terry McAulay
- TV announcers (ESPN): Mike Tirico, Joe Theismann, and Tony Kornheiser
- Recap, Game Book

Game information

**First quarter**

- No scoring plays.

**Second quarter**

- No scoring plays.

**Third quarter**

- JAX – Josh Scobee 31-yard field goal, 5:24. Jaguars 3–0. **Drive: 11 plays, 60 yards, 5:29.**

**Fourth quarter**

- JAX – Josh Scobee 32-yard field goal, 6:15. Jaguars 6–0. **Drive: 10 plays, 78 yards, 4:21.**
- JAX – Josh Scobee 42-yard field goal, 4:26. Jaguars 9–0. **Drive: 4 plays, 5 yards, 0:27.**

**Top passers**

- PIT – Ben Roethlisberger – 17/32, 141 yards, 2 INT
- JAX – Byron Leftwich – 26/39, 260 yards, INT

**Top rushers**

- PIT – Willie Parker – 11 rushes, 20 yards
- JAX – Fred Taylor – 22 rushes, 92 yards

**Top receivers**

- PIT – Nate Washington – 3 receptions, 32 yards
- JAX – Reggie Williams – 8 receptions, 95 yards

==== Week 3: at Indianapolis Colts ====
Week Three: Jacksonville Jaguars at Indianapolis Colts – Game summary

| Quarter | 1 | 2 | 3 | 4 | Total |
|---|---|---|---|---|---|
| Jaguars | 7 | 0 | 0 | 7 | **14** |
| **Colts** | 0 | 7 | 7 | 7 | **21** |

at RCA Dome, Indianapolis, Indiana

- Date: September 24, 2006
- Game time: 1:00 p.m. EDT
- Game weather: None (indoor stadium)
- Game attendance: 57,041
- Referee: Pete Morelli
- TV announcers (CBS): Greg Gumbel and Dan Dierdorf
- Recap, Game Book

Game information

**First quarter**

- JAX – Byron Leftwich 4-yard run (Josh Scobee kick), 7:31. Jaguars 7–0. **Drive: 11 plays, 78 yards, 7:29.**

**Second quarter**

- IND – Terrence Wilkins 82-yard punt return (Martin Gramatica kick), 11:42. Tied 7–7.

**Third quarter**

- IND – Dallas Clark 30-yard pass from Peyton Manning (Martin Gramatica kick), 11:55. Colts 14–7. **Drive: 7 plays, 80 yards, 3:05.**

**Fourth quarter**

- IND – Peyton Manning 2-yard run (Martin Gramatica kick), 8:30. Colts 21–7. **Drive: 8 plays, 61 yards, 3:23.**
- JAX – Maurice Jones-Drew 7-yard pass from Byron Leftwich (Josh Scobee kick), 3:32. Colts 21–14. **Drive: 12 plays, 49 yards, 4:58.**

**Top passers**

- JAX – Byron Leftwich – 16/28, 107 yards, TD, 2 INT
- IND – Peyton Manning – 14/31, 219 yards, TD

**Top rushers**

- JAX – Maurice Jones-Drew – 13 rushes, 103 yards
- IND – Dominic Rhodes – 14 rushes, 48 yards

**Top receivers**

- JAX – Maurice Jones-Drew – 4 receptions, 32 yards, TD
- IND – Marvin Harrison – 6 receptions, 94 yards

The Jaguars' defense effectively limited the Colts' offense to 66 yards and 3 first downs in the first half. However, the Jaguars could not capitalize on this strong defensive performance due to several errors. Leftwich threw an interception on their second possession while deep in Colts territory. Following that, they were forced to punt, and Colts' returner Terrence Wilkins ran back 82 yards, which resulted in the only points for the Colts in the first half. Additionally, on their final drive before halftime, Josh Scobee missed a 24–yard field goal attempt and later failed to convert a 49–yard field goal near the end of the third quarter. Ultimately, the Colts managed to score two touchdowns, securing a 21–14 victory. Manning achieved a completion rate of under 50 percent, connecting on 14 out of 31 attempts for a total of 219 yards.

==== Week 4: at Washington Redskins ====
Week Four: Jacksonville Jaguars at Washington Redskins – Game summary

| Quarter | 1 | 2 | 3 | 4 | OT | Total |
|---|---|---|---|---|---|---|
| Jaguars | 10 | 7 | 0 | 13 | 0 | **30** |
| **Redskins** | 7 | 6 | 7 | 10 | 6 | **36** |

at FedExField, Landover, Maryland

- Date: September 24, 2006
- Game time: 4:15 p.m. EDT
- Game weather: Sunny, 72 °F (22 °C)
- Game attendance: 89,450
- Referee: Jeff Triplette
- TV announcers (CBS): Dick Enberg, Randy Cross
- Box score, Game Book

Game information

**First quarter**

- JAX – Josh Scobee 46-yard field goal, 10:37. Jaguars 3–0. **Drive: 4 plays, -1 yards, 2:00.**
- WSH – Santana Moss 55-yard pass from Mark Brunell (John Hall kick), 8:25. Redskins 7–3. **Drive: 4 plays, 72 yards, 2:12.**
- JAX – Reggie Williams 33-yard pass from Byron Leftwich (Josh Scobee kick), 4:33. Jaguars 10–7. **Drive: 7 plays, 45 yards, 3:52.**

**Second quarter**

- WSH – John Hall 44-yard field goal, 12:59. Tied 10–10. **Drive: 6 plays, 19 yards, 2:23.**
- JAX – Maurice Jones-Drew 51-yard pass from Byron Leftwich (Josh Scobee kick), 11:20. Jaguars 17–10. **Drive: 4 plays, 69 yards, 1:39.**
- WSH – John Hall 37-yard field goal, 0:06. Jaguars 17–13. **Drive: 4 plays, 27 yards, 0:55.**

**Third quarter**

- WSH – Clinton Portis 1-yard run (John Hall kick), 2:49. Redskins 20–17. **Drive: 10 plays, 86 yards, 5:11.**

**Fourth quarter**

- WSH – Santana Moss 8-yard pass from Mark Brunell (John Hall kick), 12:24. Redskins 27–17. **Drive: 7 plays, 29 yards, 3:48.**
- JAX – Reggie Williams 21-yard pass from Byron Leftwich (Josh Scobee kick), 10:20. Redskins 27–24. **Drive: 4 plays, 82 yards, 2:04.**
- JAX – Josh Scobee 43-yard field goal, 6:40. Tied 27–27. **Drive: 6 plays, 8 yards, 2:17.**
- WSH – John Hall 37-yard field goal, 1:55. Redskins 30–27. **Drive: 8 plays, 31 yards, 4:45.**
- JAX – Josh Scobee 41-yard field goal, 0:06. Tied 30–30. **Drive: 11 plays, 44 yards, 1:49.**

**Overtime**

- WSH – Santana Moss 68-yard pass from Mark Brunell, 13:11. Redskins 36–30. **Drive: 3 plays, 80 yards, 1:49.**

**Top passers**

- JAX – Byron Leftwich – 18/30, 329 yards, 3 TD, INT
- WSH – Mark Brunell – 20/34, 290 yards, 3 TD, INT

**Top rushers**

- JAX – Fred Taylor – 7 rushes, 16 yards
- WSH – Clinton Portis – 27 rushes, 112 yards, TD

**Top receivers**

- JAX – Reggie Williams – 4 receptions, 94 yards, 2 TD
- WSH – Santana Moss – 4 receptions, 138 yards, 3 TD

==== Week 5: vs. New York Jets ====
Week Five: New York Jets at Jacksonville Jaguars – Game summary

| Quarter | 1 | 2 | 3 | 4 | Total |
|---|---|---|---|---|---|
| Jets | 0 | 0 | 0 | 0 | **0** |
| **Jaguars** | 14 | 14 | 10 | 3 | **41** |

at Alltel Stadium, Jacksonville, Florida

- Date: October 8, 2006
- Game time: 4:05 p.m. EDT
- Game weather: 75 °F (24 °C)
- Game attendance: 66,604
- Referee: Tony Corrente
- TV announcers (CBS): Dick Enberg, Randy Cross
- Recap, Game Book

Game information

**First quarter**

- JAX – Maurice Jones-Drew 6-yard run (Josh Scobee kick), 9:44. Jaguars 7–0. **Drive: 4 plays, 50 yards, 2:09.**
- JAX – Fred Taylor 13-yard run (Josh Scobee kick), 4:44. Jaguars 14–0. **Drive: 6 plays, 71 yards, 2:47.**

**Second quarter**

- JAX – Maurice Jones-Drew 4-yard run (Josh Scobee kick), 12:52. Jaguars 21–0. **Drive: 3 plays, 8 yards, 1:25.**
- JAX – George Wrighster 1-yard pass from Byron Leftwich (Josh Scobee kick), 7:10. Jaguars 28–0. **Drive: 8 plays, 23 yards, 4:19.**

**Third quarter**

- JAX – Josh Scobee 43-yard field goal, 10:52. Jaguars 31–0. **Drive: 10 plays, 59 yards, 4:08.**
- JAX – Reggie Williams 16-yard pass from Byron Leftwich (Josh Scobee kick), 8:50. Jaguars 38–0. **Drive: 3 plays, 24 yards, 1:45.**

**Fourth quarter**

- JAX – Josh Scobee 40-yard field goal, 2:42. Jaguars 41–0. **Drive: 10 plays, 44 yards, 6:45.**

**Top passers**

- NYJ – Chad Pennington – 10/17, 71 yards, 3 INT
- JAX – Byron Leftwich – 9/20, 140 yards, 2 TD

**Top rushers**

- NYJ – Leon Washington – 23 rushes, 101 yards
- JAX – Fred Taylor – 21 rushes, 111 yards, TD

**Top receivers**

- NYJ – Jerricho Cotchery – 4 receptions, 49 yards
- JAX – Reggie Williams – 4 receptions, 53 yards, TD

==== Week 7: at Houston Texans ====
Week Seven: Jacksonville Jaguars at Houston Texans – Game summary

| Quarter | 1 | 2 | 3 | 4 | Total |
|---|---|---|---|---|---|
| Jaguars | 0 | 0 | 7 | 0 | **7** |
| **Texans** | 0 | 10 | 0 | 17 | **27** |

at Reliant Stadium, Houston, Texas

- Date: October 22, 2006
- Game time: 12:00 p.m. CDT
- Game weather: Mostly cloudy, 58 °F (14 °C)
- Game attendance: 70,035
- Referee: Jerome Boger
- Box score, Game Book

Game information

**First quarter**

- HOU – Andre Johnson 35-yard pass from David Carr (Kris Brown kick), 12:16. Texans 7–0. **Drive: 7 plays, 45 yards, 3:52.**
- HOU – Kris Brown 43-yard field goal, 1:10. Texans 10–0. **Drive: 6 plays, 19 yards, 2:23.**

**Second quarter**

- No scoring plays.

**Third quarter**

- JAX – Maurice Jones-Drew 1-yard run (Josh Scobee kick), 9:20. Texans 10–7. **Drive: 4 plays, 50 yards, 2:09.**

**Fourth quarter**

- HOU – Wali Lundy 2-yard run (Kris Brown kick), 11:32. Texans 17–7. **Drive: 4 plays, 50 yards, 2:09.**
- HOU – Owen Daniels 14-yard pass from David Carr (Kris Brown kick), 9:57. Texans 24–7. **Drive: 7 plays, 45 yards, 3:52.**
- HOU – Kris Brown 21-yard field goal, 3:12. Texans 27–7. **Drive: 6 plays, 19 yards, 2:23.**

**Top passers**

- JAX – Byron Leftwich – 14/28, 125 yards
- HOU – David Carr – 25/34, 224 yards, 2 TD

**Top rushers**

- JAX – Fred Taylor – 16 rushes, 84 yards
- HOU – Wali Lundy – 19 rushes, 93 yards, TD

**Top receivers**

- JAX – Maurice Jones-Drew – 7 receptions, 58 yards
- HOU – Andre Johnson – 8 receptions, 106 yards, TD

==== Week 8: at Philadelphia Eagles ====
Week Eight: Jacksonville Jaguars at Philadelphia Eagles – Game summary

| Quarter | 1 | 2 | 3 | 4 | Total |
|---|---|---|---|---|---|
| **Jaguars** | 7 | 0 | 3 | 3 | **13** |
| Eagles | 0 | 0 | 3 | 3 | **6** |

at Lincoln Financial Field, Philadelphia

- Date: October 29, 2006
- Game time: 1:00 p.m. EST
- Game weather: Partly cloudy, 53 °F (12 °C)
- Game attendance: 69,249
- Referee: Ed Hochuli
- TV announcers (CBS): Greg Gumbel, Dan Dierdorf
- Box score, Game Book

Game information

**First quarter**

- JAX – Fred Taylor 5-yard run (Josh Scobee kick), 8:38. Jaguars 7–0. **Drive: 7 plays, 48 yards, 4:42.**

**Second quarter**

- No scoring plays.

**Third quarter**

- JAX – Josh Scobee 40-yard field goal, 6:09. Jaguars 10–0. **Drive: 9 plays, 24 yards, 5:08.**
- PHI – David Akers 25-yard field goal, 1:10. Jaguars 10–3. **Drive: 13 plays, 59 yards, 4:59.**

**Fourth quarter**

- JAX – Josh Scobee 27-yard field goal, 8:48. Jaguars 13–3. **Drive: 11 plays, 62 yards, 6:42.**
- PHI – David Akers 28-yard field goal, 8:48. Jaguars 13–6. **Drive: 11 plays, 63 yards, 2:04.**

**Top passers**

- JAX – David Garrard – 10/17, 87 yards
- PHI – Donovan McNabb – 18/34, 161 yards

**Top rushers**

- JAX – Fred Taylor – 15 rushes, 103 yards, TD
- PHI – Brian Westbrook – 13 rushes, 38 yards

**Top receivers**

- JAX – Matt Jones – 2 receptions, 32 yards
- PHI – Brian Westbrook – 8 receptions, 68 yards

==== Week 9: vs. Tennessee Titans ====
Week Nine: Tennessee Titans at Jacksonville Jaguars – Game summary

| Quarter | 1 | 2 | 3 | 4 | Total |
|---|---|---|---|---|---|
| Titans | 0 | 0 | 0 | 7 | **7** |
| **Jaguars** | 14 | 6 | 17 | 0 | **37** |

at Alltel Stadium, Jacksonville, Florida

- Date: November 5, 2006
- Game time: 1:00 p.m. EDT
- Game weather: Rain, 69 °F (21 °C)
- Game attendance: 66,524
- Referee: Scott Green
- Recap, Game Book

Game information

**First quarter**

- JAX – Ernest Wilford 11-yard pass from David Garrard (Josh Scobee kick), 10:51. Jaguars 7–0. **Drive: 10 plays, 71 yards, 3:33.**
- JAX – George Wrighster 14-yard pass from David Garrard (Josh Scobee kick), 3:54. Jaguars 14–0. **Drive: 4 plays, 36 yards, 2:12.**

**Second quarter**

- JAX – Josh Scobee 47-yard field goal, 14:03. Jaguars 17–0. **Drive: 7 plays, 31 yards, 2:34.**
- JAX – Josh Scobee 21-yard field goal, 9:10. Jaguars 20–0. **Drive: 4 plays, -2 yards, 1:26.**

**Third quarter**

- JAX – Ernest Wilford 22-yard pass from David Garrard (Josh Scobee kick), 11:59. Jaguars 27–0. **Drive: 5 plays, 73 yards, 3:01.**
- JAX – Scott Starks 55-yard interception return (Josh Scobee kick), 9:34. Jaguars 34–0.
- JAX – Josh Scobee 39-yard field goal, 2:35. Jaguars 37–0. **Drive: 7 plays, 43 yards, 5:11.**

**Fourth quarter**

- TEN – Drew Bennett 32-yard pass from Vince Young (Rob Bironas kick), 2:40. Jaguars 37–7. **Drive: 12 plays, 84 yards, 5:11.**

**Top passers**

- TEN – Vince Young – 15/36, 163 yards, TD, 3 INT
- JAX – David Garrard – 12/22, 177 yards, 3 TD

**Top rushers**

- TEN – Travis Henry – 19 rushes, 67 yards
- JAX – Fred Taylor – 13 rushes, 79 yards

**Top receivers**

- TEN – Bo Scaife – 5 receptions, 70 yards
- JAX – Matt Jones – 3 receptions, 66 yards

==== Week 10: vs. Houston Texans ====
Week Ten: Houston Texans at Jacksonville Jaguars – Game summary

| Quarter | 1 | 2 | 3 | 4 | Total |
|---|---|---|---|---|---|
| **Texans** | 10 | 0 | 3 | 0 | **13** |
| Jaguars | 0 | 3 | 0 | 7 | **10** |

at Alltel Stadium, Jacksonville, Florida

- Date: November 12, 2006
- Game time: 1:00 p.m. EST
- Game weather: 56 °F (13 °C)
- Game attendance: 65,918
- Referee: Gene Steratore
- TV announcers (CBS): Craig Bolerjack, Richard Baldinger
- Recap, Game Book

Game information

**First quarter**

- HOU – Wali Lundy 1-yard run (Kris Brown kick), 11:08. Texans 707. **Drive: 9 plays, 70 yards, 3:52.**
- HOU – Kris Brown 25-yard field goal, 4:52. Texans 10–0. **Drive: 10 plays, 35 yards, 4:18.**

**Second quarter**

- JAX – Josh Scobee 44-yard field goal, 14:48. Texans 10–3. **Drive: 10 plays, 54 yards, 5:04.**

**Third quarter**

- HOU – Kris Brown 28-yard field goal, 4:55. Texans 13–3. **Drive: 7 plays, 21 yards, 3:01.**

**Fourth quarter**

- JAX – Maurice Jones-Drew 3-yard run (Josh Scobee kick), 4:32. Texans 13–10. **Drive: 5 plays, 60 yards, 1:08.**

**Top passers**

- HOU – David Carr – 16/32, 167 yards
- JAX – David Garrard – 15/34, 214 yards, 4 INT

**Top rushers**

- HOU – Samkon Gado – 17 rushes, 67 yards
- JAX – Fred Taylor – 12 rushes, 63 yards

**Top receivers**

- HOU – Andre Johnson – 3 receptions, 56 yards
- JAX – Fred Taylor – 5 receptions, 71 yards

==== Week 11: vs. New York Giants ====
Week Eleven: New York Giants at Jacksonville Jaguars – Game summary

| Quarter | 1 | 2 | 3 | 4 | Total |
|---|---|---|---|---|---|
| Giants | 3 | 0 | 7 | 0 | **10** |
| **Jaguars** | 3 | 7 | 6 | 10 | **26** |

at Alltel Stadium, Jacksonville, Florida

- Date: November 20, 2006
- Game time: 8:40 p.m. EST
- Game weather: 45 °F (7 °C)
- Game attendance: 67,164
- Referee: Ron Winter
- TV announcers (ESPN): Mike Tirico, Joe Theismann, and Tony Kornheiser
- Recap, Game Book

Game information

**First quarter**

- NYG – Jay Feely 40-yard field goal, 11:38. Giants 3–0. **Drive: 4 plays, 7 yards, 1:12.**
- JAX – Josh Scobee 39-yard field goal, 7:40. Tied 3–3. **Drive: 8 plays, 52 yards, 3:58.**

**Second quarter**

- JAX – Fred Taylor 10-yard run (Josh Scobee kick), 10:15. Jaguars 10–3. **Drive: 8 plays, 57 yards, 4:38.**

**Third quarter**

- JAX – Josh Scobee 24-yard field goal, 9:43. Jaguars 13–3. **Drive: 8 plays, 41 yards, 4:24.**
- NYG – Plaxico Burress 25-yard pass from Eli Manning (Jay Feely kick), 6:32. Jaguars 13–10. **Drive: 11 plays, 70 yards, 3:11.**
- JAX – Josh Scobee 23-yard field goal, 0:53. Jaguars 16–10. **Drive: 12 plays, 59 yards, 5:39.**

**Fourth quarter**

- JAX – Maurice Jones-Drew 3-yard run (Josh Scobee kick), 12:36. Jaguars 23–10. **Drive: 4 plays, 55 yards, 2:24.**
- JAX – Josh Scobee 48-yard field goal, 5:39. Jaguars 26–10. **Drive: 7 plays, 34 yards, 3:50.**

**Top passers**

- NYG – Eli Manning – 19/41, 230 yards, TD, 2 INT
- JAX – David Garrard – 19/32, 249 yards

**Top rushers**

- NYG – Tiki Barber – 10 rushes, 27 yards
- JAX – Fred Taylor – 24 rushes, 79 yards, TD

**Top receivers**

- NYG – Jeremy Shockey – 7 receptions, 82 yards
- JAX – Ernest Wilford – 5 receptions, 72 yards

==== Week 12: at Buffalo Bills ====
Week Twelve: Jacksonville Jaguars at Buffalo Bills – Game summary

| Quarter | 1 | 2 | 3 | 4 | Total |
|---|---|---|---|---|---|
| Jaguars | 0 | 14 | 0 | 10 | **24** |
| Bills | 7 | 10 | 7 | 3 | **27** |

at Ralph Wilson Stadium, Orchard Park, New York

- Date: November 26, 2006
- Game time: 1:00 p.m. EST
- Game weather: Sunny, 60 °F (16 °C)
- Game attendance: 63,608
- Referee: Gerry Austin
- TV announcers (CBS): Ian Eagle and Solomon Wilcots
- Recap, Game Book

Game information

**First quarter**

- BUF – Willis McGahee 4-yard run (Rian Lindell kick), 3:23. Bills 7–0. **Drive: 4 plays, 28 yards, 2:04.**

**Second quarter**

- BUF – Rian Lindell 21-yard field goal, 12:58. Bills 10–0. **Drive: 6 plays, 54 yards, 3:11.**
- JAX – Maurice Jones-Drew 14-yard run (Josh Scobee kick), 10:25. Bills 10–7. **Drive: 5 plays, 62 yards, 2:33.**
- BUF – Willis McGahee 30-yard run (Rian Lindell kick), 6:32. Bills 17–7. **Drive: 8 plays, 80 yards, 3:53.**
- JAX – Marcedes Lewis 1-yard pass from David Garrard (Josh Scobee kick), 1:11. Bills 17–14. **Drive: 9 plays, 71 yards, 5:21.**

**Third quarter**

- BUF – Roscoe Parrish 81-yard punt return (Rian Lindell kick), 3:46. Bills 24–14.

**Fourth quarter**

- JAX – Josh Scobee 27-yard field goal, 14:56. Bills 24–17. **Drive: 7 plays, 38 yards, 3:50.**
- JAX – Matt Jones 3-yard pass from David Garrard (Josh Scobee kick), 2:58. Tied 24–24. **Drive: 11 plays, 62 yards, 2:30.**
- BUF – Rian Lindell 42-yard field goal, 0:00. Bills 27–24. **Drive: 4 plays, 36 yards, 0:28.**

**Top passers**

- JAX – David Garrard – 16/22, 132 yards, 2 TD
- BUF – J. P. Losman – 21/28, 169 yards, INT

**Top rushers**

- JAX – Fred Taylor – 22 rushes, 101 yards
- BUF – Willis McGahee – 12 rushes, 83 yards, 2 TD

**Top receivers**

- JAX – Maurice Jones-Drew – 5 receptions, 47 yards
- BUF – Lee Evans – 5 receptions, 58 yards

==== Week 13: at Miami Dolphins ====
Week Thirteen: Jacksonville Jaguars at Miami Dolphins – Game summary

| Quarter | 1 | 2 | 3 | 4 | Total |
|---|---|---|---|---|---|
| **Jaguars** | 3 | 14 | 0 | 7 | **24** |
| Dolphins | 7 | 0 | 0 | 3 | **10** |

at Dolphin Stadium, Miami Gardens, Florida

- Date: December 3, 2006
- Game time: 4:05 p.m. EST
- Game weather: Partly cloudy, 81 °F (27 °C)
- Game attendance: 73,160
- Referee: Gerry Austin
- TV announcers (CBS): Kevin Harlan, Rich Gannon
- Recap, Game Book

Game information

**First quarter**

- MIA – Marty Booker 17-yard pass from Joey Harrington (Olindo Mare kick), 7:40. Dolphins 7–0. **Drive: 14 plays, 80 yards, 7:20.**
- JAX – Josh Scobee 48-yard field goal, 0:00. Dolphins 7–3. **Drive: 12 plays, 47 yards, 7:40.**

**Second quarter**

- JAX – Matt Jones 15-yard pass from David Garrard (Josh Scobee kick), 2:58. Jaguars 10–7. **Drive: 11 plays, 95 yards, 6:13.**
- JAX – George Wrighster 16-yard pass from David Garrard (Josh Scobee kick), 0:14. Jaguars 17–7. **Drive: 2 plays, 33 yards, 0:24.**

**Third quarter**

- No scoring plays.

**Fourth quarter**

- JAX – Maurice Jones-Drew 32-yard run (Josh Scobee kick), 7:30. Jaguars 24–7. **Drive: 9 plays, 91 yards, 5:49.**
- MIA – Olindo Mare 42-yard field goal, 3:45. Jaguars 24–10. **Drive: 9 plays, 36 yards, 3:45.**

**Top passers**

- JAX – David Garrard – 16/22, 229 yards, 2 TD
- MIA – Joey Harrington – 27/42, 267 yards, TD, 2 INT

**Top rushers**

- JAX – Fred Taylor – 19 rushes, 76 yards
- MIA – Sammy Morris – 12 rushes, 47 yards

**Top receivers**

- JAX – Matt Jones – 6 receptions, 128 yards, TD
- MIA – Chris Chambers – 8 receptions, 121 yards

==== Week 14: vs. Indianapolis Colts ====
Week Fourteen: Indianapolis Colts at Jacksonville Jaguars – Game summary

| Quarter | 1 | 2 | 3 | 4 | Total |
|---|---|---|---|---|---|
| Colts | 3 | 7 | 0 | 7 | **17** |
| **Jaguars** | 7 | 17 | 13 | 7 | **44** |

at Alltel Stadium, Jacksonville, Florida

- Date: December 10, 2006
- Game time: 1:00 p.m. EST
- Game weather: Sunny, 65 °F (18 °C)
- Game attendance: 67,164
- Referee: Jerome Boger
- TV announcers (CBS): Kevin Harlan and Rich Gannon
- Recap, Game Book

Game information

**First quarter**

- JAX – Maurice Jones-Drew 18-yard run (Josh Scobee kick), 12:19. Jaguars 7–0. **Drive: 2 plays, 94 yards, 1:00.**
- IND – Adam Vinatieri 41-yard field goal, 6:05. Jaguars 7–3. **Drive: 7 plays, 39 yards, 3:23.**

**Second quarter**

- IND – Dominic Rhodes 1-yard run (Adam Vinatieri kick), 8:18. Colts 10–7. **Drive: 12 plays, 80 yards, 5:54.**
- JAX – Fred Taylor 21-yard run (Josh Scobee kick), 5:45. Jaguars 14–10. **Drive: 5 plays, 81 yards, 2:33.**
- JAX – Maurice Jones-Drew 48-yard run (Josh Scobee kick), 1:17. Jaguars 21–10. **Drive: 5 plays, 73 yards, 1:32.**
- JAX – Josh Scobee 48-yard field goal, 0:00. Jaguars 24–10. **Drive: 4 plays, 5 yards, 0:25.**

**Third quarter**

- JAX – Maurice Jones-Drew 93-yard kickoff return (Josh Scobee kick), 14:48. Jaguars 31–10.
- JAX – Josh Scobee 34-yard field goal, 11:07. Jaguars 34–10. **Drive: 5 plays, 31 yards, 2:50.**
- JAX – Josh Scobee 46-yard field goal, 0:22. Jaguars 37–10. **Drive: 8 plays, 35 yards, 4:54.**

**Fourth quarter**

- IND – Peyton Manning 1-yard run (Adam Vinatieri kick), 11:13. Jaguars 37–17. **Drive: 12 plays, 80 yards, 4:09.**
- JAX – Alvin Pearman 6-yard run (Josh Scobee kick), 3:59. Jaguars 44–17. **Drive: 11 plays, 70 yards, 7:14.**

**Top passers**

- IND – Peyton Manning – 25/50, 313 yards, INT
- JAX – David Garrard – 8/14, 79 yards, INT

**Top rushers**

- IND – Joseph Addai – 11 rushes, 22 yards
- JAX – Maurice Jones-Drew – 15 rushes, 166 yards, 2 TD

**Top receivers**

- IND – Reggie Wayne – 8 receptions, 110 yards
- JAX – Marcedes Lewis – 1 reception, 19 yards

On the first play from scrimmage for the Jaguars, Fred Taylor gained 76 yards on a run into Colts territory, followed by an 18–yard rushing touchdown by rookie running back Maurice Jones-Drew. After a Colts touchdown, Jones-Drew rushed twice for a total of 34 yards, followed by Taylor's 19–yard run and a 21–yard rushing touchdown. Following an interception thrown by Manning, Jones-Drew added a 48–yard rushing touchdown. The Jaguars capped off the first half with a field goal, leading 24–10 at halftime. On the second-half kickoff, Jones-Drew made a 93–yard return for a touchdown. He further contributed with an additional 48 rushing yards, while running back Alvin Pearman stepped in for Taylor, rushing for 73 yards, which included a 6–yard touchdown run. The running backs' collective rushing performance played a pivotal role in securing a decisive 44–17 victory against the Colts.

During this game, the Jaguars combined for 375 rushing yards, the second-most in a single game since the AFL–NFL merger. Maurice Jones-Drew had a franchise-record 302 all-purpose yards; 166 rushing yards with two touchdowns, 15 receiving yards, and 121 return yards with a kickoff return touchdown. Fred Taylor had 131 rushing yards with one touchdown. Alvin Pearman contributed 71 rushing yards on 13 carries with one touchdown.

==== Week 15: at Tennessee Titans ====
Week Fifteen: Jacksonville Jaguars at Tennessee Titans – Game summary

| Quarter | 1 | 2 | 3 | 4 | Total |
|---|---|---|---|---|---|
| Jaguars | 7 | 3 | 0 | 7 | **17** |
| **Titans** | 7 | 0 | 17 | 0 | **24** |

at LP Field, Nashville, Tennessee

- Date: December 17, 2006
- Game time: 12:00 p.m. CST
- Game weather: Sunny, 70 °F (21 °C)
- Game attendance: 69,143
- Referee: Mike Carey
- Recap, Game Book

Game information

**First quarter**

- TEN – Adam Jones 82-yard interception return (Rob Bironas kick), 9:00. Titans 7–0.
- JAX – Maurice Jones-Drew 12-yard run (Josh Scobee kick), 3:03. Tied 7–7. **Drive: 10 plays, 67 yards, 5:57.**

**Second quarter**

- JAX – Josh Scobee 43-yard field goal, 11:22. Jaguars 10–7. **Drive: 9 plays, 42 yards, 5:07.**

**Third quarter**

- TEN – Rob Bironas 27-yard field goal, 13:24. Tied 10–10. **Drive: 4 plays, 5 yards, 1:36.**
- TEN – Cortland Finnegan 92-yard fumble return (Rob Bironas kick), 4:51. Titans 17–10.
- TEN – Chris Hope 61-yard interception return (Rob Bironas kick), 1:08. Titans 24–10.

**Fourth quarter**

- JAX – Matt Jones 3-yard pass from David Garrard (Josh Scobee kick), 2:37. Titans 24–17. **Drive: 5 plays, 59 yards, 1:44.**

Top passers

- JAX – David Garrard – 22/37, 233 yards, TD, 3 INT
- TEN – Vince Young – 8/15, 85 yards

Top rushers

- JAX – Maurice Jones-Drew – 25 rushes, 98 yards, TD
- TEN – Travis Henry – 12 rushes, 37 yards

Top receivers

- JAX – Reggie Williams – 4 receptions, 88 yards
- TEN – Bobby Wade – 3 receptions, 48 yards

==== Week 16: vs. New England Patriots ====
Week Sixteen: New England Patriots at Jacksonville Jaguars – Game summary

| Quarter | 1 | 2 | 3 | 4 | Total |
|---|---|---|---|---|---|
| **Patriots** | 0 | 10 | 7 | 7 | **24** |
| Jaguars | 0 | 7 | 7 | 7 | **21** |

at Alltel Stadium, Jacksonville, Florida

- Date: December 24, 2006
- Game time: 1:00 p.m. EST
- Game weather: 65 °F (18 °C)
- Game attendance: 67,164
- Referee: Walt Anderson
- TV announcers (CBS): Greg Gumbel and Dan Dierdorf
- Recap, Game Book

Game information

**First quarter**

- NE – Stephen Gostkowski 48-yard field goal, 13:19. Patriots 3–0. **Drive: 8 plays, 38 yards, 4:13.**
- JAX – Maurice Jones-Drew 74-yard run (Josh Scobee kick), 12:59. Jaguars 7–3. **Drive: 1 play, 74 yards, 0:20.**
- NE – Corey Dillon 1-yard run (Stephen Gostkowski kick), 1:17. Patriots 10–7. **Drive: 14 plays, 82 yards, 7:21.**

**Second quarter**

- No scoring plays.

**Third quarter**

- NE – David Thomas 22-yard pass from Tom Brady (Stephen Gostkowski kick), 11:24. Patriots 17–7. **Drive: 7 plays, 78 yards, 3:36.**
- JAX – Maurice Jones-Drew 1-yard run (Josh Scobee kick), 3:0659. Patriots 17–14. **Drive: 3 plays, 61 yards, 1:37.**

**Fourth quarter**

- NE – Laurence Maroney 27-yard run (Stephen Gostkowski kick), 4:36. Patriots 24–14. **Drive: 6 plays, 68 yards, 3:49.**
- JAX – Matt Jones 33-yard pass from David Garrard (Josh Scobee kick), 3:03. Patriots 24–21. **Drive: 5 plays, 60 yards, 1:33.**

**Top passers**

- NE – Tom Brady – 28/39, 249 yards, TD
- JAX – David Garrard – 17/23, 195 yards, TD

**Top rushers**

- NE – Laurence Maroney – 7 rushes, 48 yards, TD
- JAX – Maurice Jones-Drew – 19 rushes, 131 yards, 2 TD

**Top receivers**

- NE – David Thomas – 5 receptions, 83 yards, TD
- JAX – Matt Jones – 4 receptions, 69 yards, TD

==== Week 17: at Kansas City Chiefs ====
Week Seventeen: Jacksonville Jaguars at Kansas City Chiefs – Game summary

| Quarter | 1 | 2 | 3 | 4 | Total |
|---|---|---|---|---|---|
| Jaguars | 0 | 10 | 14 | 6 | **30** |
| **Chiefs** | 7 | 14 | 14 | 0 | **35** |

at Arrowhead Stadium, Kansas City, Missouri

- Date: December 31, 2006
- Game time: 12:00 p.m. CST
- Game weather: Overcast, 40 °F (4 °C)
- Game attendance: 77,500
- Referee: Tony Corrente
- TV announcers (CBS): Gus Johnson and Steve Tasker
- Recap, Game Book

Game information

**First quarter**

- KC – Bernard Pollard blocked punt recovery in end zone (Lawrence Tynes kick), 9:10. Chiefs 7–0.

**Second quarter**

- JAX – Fred Taylor 26-yard pass from David Garrard (Josh Scobee kick), 14:06. Tied 7–7. **Drive: 9 plays, 78 yards, 5:54.**
- JAX – Josh Scobee 33-yard field goal, 9:59. Jaguars 10–7. **Drive: 6 plays, 28 yards, 3:02.**
- KC – Larry Johnson 1-yard run (Lawrence Tynes kick), 7:09. Chiefs 14–10. **Drive: 5 plays, 63 yards, 2:50.**
- KC – Eddie Kennison 35-yard pass from Trent Green (Lawrence Tynes kick), 1:52. Chiefs 21–10. **Drive: 6 plays, 72 yards, 2:38.**

**Third quarter**

- KC – Larry Johnson 2-yard run (Lawrence Tynes kick), 12:08. Chiefs 28–10. **Drive: 1 play, 2 yards, 0:04.**
- JAX – Quinn Gray 9-yard run (Josh Scobee kick), 9:31. Chiefs 28–17. **Drive: 5 plays, 59 yards, 2:37.**
- KC – Larry Johnson 12-yard run (Lawrence Tynes kick), 7:04. Chiefs 35–17. **Drive: 7 plays, 75 yards, 3:27.**
- JAX – Quinn Gray 17-yard run (Josh Scobee kick), 3:00. Chiefs 35–24. **Drive: 8 plays, 69 yards, 4:04.**

**Fourth quarter**

- JAX – Maurice Jones-Drew 5-yard run (run failed), 5:00. Chiefs 35–30. **Drive: 7 plays, 51 yards, 2:07.**

**Top passers**

- JAX – Quinn Gray – 13/22, 166 yards
- KC – Trent Green – 14/21, 181 yards, TD, 2 INT

**Top rushers**

- JAX – Maurice Jones-Drew – 12 rushes, 46 yards, TD
- KC – Larry Johnson – 33 rushes, 138 yards, 3 TD

**Top receivers**

- JAX – Matt Jones – 5 receptions, 104 yards
- KC – Eddie Kennison – 6 receptions, 144 yards, TD

=== Standings ===
==== Division ====
AFC South
| | W | L | T | PCT | DIV | CONF | PF | PA | STK |
|---|---|---|---|---|---|---|---|---|---|
| ^{(3)} Indianapolis Colts | 12 | 4 | 0 | .750 | 3–3 | 9–3 | 427 | 360 | W1 |
| Tennessee Titans | 8 | 8 | 0 | .500 | 4–2 | 5–7 | 324 | 400 | L1 |
| Jacksonville Jaguars | 8 | 8 | 0 | .500 | 2–4 | 5–7 | 371 | 274 | L3 |
| Houston Texans | 6 | 10 | 0 | .375 | 3–3 | 6–6 | 267 | 366 | W2 |

==== Conference ====
AFC
| # | Team | Division | W | L | T | PCT | DIV | CONF | SOS | SOV | STK |
|---|---|---|---|---|---|---|---|---|---|---|---|
**Division leaders**
| 1 | San Diego Chargers | West | 14 | 2 | 0 | .875 | 5–1 | 10–2 | .457 | .424 | W10 |
| 2 | Baltimore Ravens | North | 13 | 3 | 0 | .813 | 5–1 | 10–2 | .461 | .447 | W4 |
| 3 (Note: Indianapolis claimed the No. 3 seed over New England based on head-to-head victory.) | Indianapolis Colts | South | 12 | 4 | 0 | .750 | 3–3 | 9–3 | .500 | .505 | W1 |
| 4 | New England Patriots | East | 12 | 4 | 0 | .750 | 4–2 | 8–4 | .496 | .469 | W3 |
**Wild cards**
| 5 | New York Jets | East | 10 | 6 | 0 | .625 | 4–2 | 7–5 | .469 | .400 | W3 |
| 6 (Note: Kansas City finished ahead of Denver based on division record, claiming the 6th and final playoff spot.) | Kansas City Chiefs | West | 9 | 7 | 0 | .563 | 4–2 | 5–7 | .492 | .444 | W2 |
**Did not qualify for the postseason**
| 7 | Denver Broncos | West | 9 | 7 | 0 | .563 | 3–3 | 8–4 | .531 | .438 | L1 |
| 8 (Note: Cincinnati finished ahead of Tennessee based on conference record. Division tie break was initially used to eliminate Pittsburgh (see below).) (Note: Cincinnati finished ahead of Pittsburgh based on division record.) | Cincinnati Bengals | North | 8 | 8 | 0 | .500 | 4–2 | 6–6 | .535 | .453 | L3 |
| 9 (Note: Tennessee finished ahead of Pittsburgh based on strength of victory. Division tie break was initially used to eliminate Jacksonville (see below).) (Note: Tennessee finished ahead of Jacksonville based on division record.) | Tennessee Titans | South | 8 | 8 | 0 | .500 | 4–2 | 5–7 | .570 | .484 | L1 |
| 10 (Note: Jacksonville finished ahead of Pittsburgh based on head-to-head victory.) | Jacksonville Jaguars | South | 8 | 8 | 0 | .500 | 2–4 | 5–7 | .531 | .555 | L3 |
| 11 | Pittsburgh Steelers | North | 8 | 8 | 0 | .500 | 3–3 | 5–7 | .496 | .414 | W1 |
| 12 | Buffalo Bills | East | 7 | 9 | 0 | .438 | 3–3 | 5–7 | .574 | .446 | L2 |
| 13 (Note: Houston finished ahead of Miami based on head-to-head victory.) | Houston Texans | South | 6 | 10 | 0 | .375 | 3–3 | 6–6 | .504 | .417 | W2 |
| 14 | Miami Dolphins | East | 6 | 10 | 0 | .375 | 1–5 | 3–9 | .543 | .531 | L3 |
| 15 | Cleveland Browns | North | 4 | 12 | 0 | .250 | 0–6 | 3–9 | .535 | .438 | L4 |
| 16 | Oakland Raiders | West | 2 | 14 | 0 | .125 | 0–6 | 1–11 | .555 | .406 | L9 |
**Tiebreakers** (Note: When breaking ties for three or more teams under the NFL's rules, they are first broken within divisions, then comparing only the highest ranked remaining team from each division.)
