= 2005 Jacksonville Jaguars season =

11th season in franchise history

- Owner: Wayne Weaver
- General manager: James "Shack" Harris
- Head coach: Jack Del Rio
- Offensive coordinator: Carl Smith
- Defensive coordinator: Mike Smith
- Home stadium: Alltel Stadium

Results
- Record: 12–4
- Division place: 2nd AFC South
- Playoffs: Lost Wild Card Playoffs (at Patriots) 3–28
- Pro Bowlers: DT Marcus Stroud

Uniform

The 2005 Jacksonville Jaguars season was the eleventh season in franchise history. The Jaguars finished 12–4 in the regular season, but did not win their own division, being swept by the Indianapolis Colts who finished 14–2. The Jaguars reached the playoffs for the first time since 1999, but lost in the Wild Card Round of the playoffs to the two-time defending Super Bowl champion New England Patriots by a final score of 28–3.

The Jaguars would not improve upon this record until the 2025 season.

== Offseason ==
Additions	Subtractions
CB Terry Cousin (Giants)	FB Marc Edwards (Bears)
DE Reggie Hayward (Broncos)	WR Troy Edwards (Titans)
DE Marcellus Wiley (Cowboys)	CB Kiwaukee Thomas (Dolphins)
	CB Juran Bolden (Buccaneers)
	T Bob Whitfield (Giants)

=== NFL draft ===
2005 Jacksonville Jaguars draft
Round	Pick	Player	Position	College	Notes
1	21	Matt Jones	Wide receiver	Arkansas	
2	52	Khalif Barnes	Offensive tackle	Washington	
3	87	Scott Starks	Cornerback	Wisconsin	
4	127	Alvin Pearman	Running back	Virginia	
5	157	Gerald Sensabaugh	Safety	North Carolina	
6	185	Chad Owens	Wide receiver	Hawaii	
6	194	Pat Thomas	Linebacker	NC State	
7	237	Chris Roberson	Cornerback	Eastern Michigan	
Made roster † Pro Football Hall of Fame * Made at least one Pro Bowl during career

=== Undrafted free agents ===
2005 undrafted free agents of note
Player	Position	College
Dan Connolly	Guard	Southeast Missouri State
Jim Davis	Defensive end	Virginia Tech
Andrew Economos	Long Snapper	Georgia Tech
Jamar Enzor	Linebacker	Cincinnati
Julius Franklin	Guard	Bethune–Cookman
James Kinney	Linebacker	Missouri
Jason Mitchell	Wide receiver	USC
Benard Thomas	Defensive end	Nebraska
Lee Webb	Running back	USC
Derrick Wimbush	Fullback	Fort Valley State
Mark Wood	Tight end	Fresno State

== Staff ==
2005 Jacksonville Jaguars staff
Front office: Chairman/chief executive officer – Wayne Weaver; Head coaches: Head coach – Jack Del Rio; Assistant head coach/secondary – Dave Campo; Offensive coaches: Offensive coordinator – Carl Smith; Quarterbacks – Ken Anderson; Running backs – Kennedy Polamalu; Wide receivers – Steve Walters; Tight ends – Alfredo Roberts; Offensive line – Paul Boudreau; Assistant offensive line – Andy Heck	Defensive coaches: Defensive coordinator – Mike Smith; Defensive line – Ray Hamilton; Assistant defensive line – Todd Howard; Linebackers – Brian VanGorder; Defensive backs – Alvin Reynolds; Special teams coaches: Special teams coordinator – Pete Rodriguez; Assistant special teams – Mark Michaels; Strength and conditioning: Strength and conditioning – Mark Asanovich; Assistant strength and conditioning – Les Ebert

== Final roster ==
2005 Jacksonville Jaguars roster
Quarterbacks (QB): 9 David Garrard; 5 Quinn Gray; 7 Byron Leftwich; Running backs (RB): 40 Rich Alexis; 33 Greg Jones FB; 34 Alvin Pearman; 28 Fred Taylor; 22 LaBrandon Toefield; 36 Derrick Wimbush; Wide receivers (WR): 85 Cortez Hankton; 18 Matt Jones; 82 Jimmy Smith; 19 Ernest Wilford; 11 Reggie Williams; Tight ends (TE): 80 Kyle Brady; 86 Brian Jones; 87 George Wrighster	Offensive linemen (OL): 69 Khalif Barnes OT; 61 Dan Connolly G; 68 Derrick Fletcher G; 67 Vince Manuwai G; 65 Chris Naeole G; 62 Dennis Norman C; 72 Mike Pearson OT; 66 Brett Romberg C; 74 Maurice Williams OT; Defensive linemen (DL): 78 Martin Chase DT; 94 Jim Davis DE; 97 Reggie Hayward DE; 98 John Henderson DT; 93 Bobby McCray DE; 92 Rob Meier DT; 95 Paul Spicer DE; 99 Marcus Stroud DT; 75 Marcellus Wiley DE	Linebackers (LB): 51 Akin Ayodele OLB; 55 Greg Favors OLB; 50 Tony Gilbert MLB; 54 Mike Peterson MLB; 52 Daryl Smith OLB; 53 Pat Thomas OLB; Defensive backs (DB): 35 Deke Cooper SS; 21 Terry Cousin CB; 37 Deon Grant FS; 27 Rashean Mathis CB; 26 David Richardson CB; 38 Chris Roberson CB; 43 Gerald Sensabaugh S; 31 Scott Starks CB; 25 Kenny Wright CB; Special teams (ST): 2 Chris Hanson P; 10 Josh Scobee K; 88 Joe Zelenka LS	Practice squad: 70 Walter Curry DT; 60 Andrew Economos LS; 12 Nate Hybl QB; -- James Kinney LB; 84 Chad Owens WR; 13 Fred Stamps WR; 44 Lee Webb RB; Reserve: 58 Jorge Cordova OLB (IR); 20 Donovin Darius S (IR); 91 Anthony Maddox DT (IR); 63 Brad Meester C (IR); 41 Nick Sorensen S (IR); 59 Tracy White LOB (IR); 55 Jamie Winborn OLB (IR); 83 Todd Yoder TE (IR); Rookies in italics 53 active, 8 reserve, 7 practice squad

== Preseason ==
Week	Date	Opponent	Result	Record	Venue
1	August 13	Miami Dolphins	W 27–17	1–0	Alltel Stadium
2	August 20	at Tampa Bay Buccaneers	W 20–17	2–0	Raymond James Stadium
3	August 25	Atlanta Falcons	L 7–23	2–2	Alltel Stadium
4	September 1	at Dallas Cowboys	L 20–27	2–2	Texas Stadium

== Regular season ==
=== Schedule ===
Week	Date	Opponent	Result	Record	Venue	Attendance
1	September 11	Seattle Seahawks	**W** 26–14	1–0	Alltel Stadium	65,204
2	September 18	at **Indianapolis Colts**	**L** 3–10	1–1	RCA Dome	56,460
3	September 25	at New York Jets	**W** 26–20 (OT)	2–1	Giants Stadium	77,422
4	October 2	Denver Broncos	**L** 7–20	2–2	Alltel Stadium	66,045
5	October 9	Cincinnati Bengals	**W** 23–20	3–2	Alltel Stadium	66,137
6	October 16	at Pittsburgh Steelers	**W** 23–17 (OT)	4–2	Heinz Field	63,891
7	Bye					
8	October 30	at St. Louis Rams	**L** 21–24	4–3	Edward Jones Dome	65,251
9	November 6	**Houston Texans**	**W** 21–14	5–3	Alltel Stadium	64,613
10	November 13	Baltimore Ravens	**W** 30–3	6–3	Alltel Stadium	66,107
11	November 20	at **Tennessee Titans**	**W** 31–28	7–3	The Coliseum	69,149
12	November 27	at Arizona Cardinals	**W** 24–17	8–3	Sun Devil Stadium	39,198
13	December 4	at Cleveland Browns	**W** 20–14	9–3	Cleveland Browns Stadium	70,941
14	December 11	**Indianapolis Colts**	**L** 18–26	9–4	Alltel Stadium	67,164
15	December 18	San Francisco 49ers	**W** 10–9	10–4	Alltel Stadium	64,764
16	December 24	at **Houston Texans**	**W** 38–20	11–4	Reliant Stadium	70,025
17	January 1	**Tennessee Titans**	**W** 40–13	12–4	Alltel Stadium	65,485

Note: Intra-division opponents are in bold text.

=== Game summaries ===
==== Week 1: vs. Seattle Seahawks ====
Week One: Seattle Seahawks at Jacksonville Jaguars – Game summary

Quarter	1	2	3	4	Total
Seahawks	0	14	0	0	**14**
**Jaguars**	6	7	7	6	**26**

at Alltel Stadium, Jacksonville, Florida

- Date: September 11, 2005
- Game time: 1:00 p.m. EST
- Game weather: 78 °F (26 °C)
- Game attendance: 65,204
- Referee: Ed Hochuli
- TV announcers (Fox): Craig Shemon, Erik Kramer, and Lee Gordon
- Recap, Game Book

Game information

**First quarter**

- JAX – Josh Scobee 23-yard field goal, 11:03. Jaguars 3–0. **Drive: 7 plays, 36 yards, 3:49.**
- JAX – Josh Scobee 41-yard field goal, 3:49. Jaguars 6–0. **Drive: 11 plays, 57 yards, 5:05.**

**Second quarter**

- SEA – Joe Jurevicius 33-yard pass from Matt Hasselbeck (Josh Brown kick), 14:52. Seahawks 7–6. **Drive: 8 plays, 80 yards, 3:57.**
- JAX – Jimmy Smith 30-yard pass from Byron Leftwich (Josh Scobee kick), 4:17. Jaguars 13–7. **Drive: 5 plays, 74 yards, 2:02.**
- SEA – Darrell Jackson 9-yard pass from Matt Hasselbeck (Josh Brown kick), 0:47. Seahawks 14–13. **Drive: 7 plays, 80 yards, 3:30.**

**Third quarter**

- JAX – Jimmy Smith 7-yard pass from Byron Leftwich (Josh Scobee kick), 8:39. Jaguars 20–14. **Drive: 12 plays, 78 yards, 6:21.**

**Fourth quarter**

- JAX – Josh Scobee 29-yard field goal, 4:32. Jaguars 23–14. **Drive: 4 plays, 4 yards, 1:48.**
- JAX – Josh Scobee 41-yard field goal, 1:55. Jaguars 26–14. **Drive: 4 plays, 8 yards, 1:43.**

**Top passers**

- SEA – Matt Hasselbeck – 21/36, 246 yards, 2 TD, 2 INT
- JAX – Byron Leftwich – 17/31, 252 yards, 2 TD

**Top rushers**

- SEA – Shaun Alexander – 14 rushes, 73 yards
- JAX – Fred Taylor – 20 rushes, 76 yards

**Top receivers**

- SEA – Bobby Engram – 8 receptions, 79 yards
- JAX – Jimmy Smith – 7 receptions, 130 yards, 2 TD

==== Week 2: at Indianapolis Colts ====
Week Two: Jacksonville Jaguars at Indianapolis Colts – Game summary

Quarter	1	2	3	4	Total
Jaguars	0	0	3	0	**3**
**Colts**	0	0	0	10	**10**

at RCA Dome, Indianapolis, Indiana

- Date: September 18, 2005
- Game time: 12:00 p.m. EST
- Game weather: None (indoor stadium)
- Game attendance: 56,460
- Referee: Scott Green
- TV announcers (CBS): Gus Johnson, and Brent Jones
- Recap, Game Book

Game information

**First quarter**

- No scoring plays.

**Second quarter**

- No scoring plays.

**Third quarter**

- JAX – Josh Scobee 28-yard field goal, 6:59. Jaguars 3–0. **Drive: 7 plays, 23 yards, 3:40.**

**Fourth quarter**

- IND – Ran Carthon 6-yard run (Mike Vanderjagt kick), 8:27. Colts 7–3. **Drive: 17 plays, 88 yards, 8:59.**
- IND – Mike Vanderjagt 41-yard field goal, 1:50. Colts 10–3. **Drive: 9 plays, 34 yards, 3:51.**

Top passers

- JAX – Byron Leftwich – 16/29, 198 yards
- IND – Peyton Manning – 13/28, 122 yards, INT

Top rushers

- JAX – Fred Taylor – 16 rushes, 81 yards
- IND – Edgerrin James – 27 rushes, 128 yards

Top receivers

- JAX – Jimmy Smith – 3 receptions, 49 yards
- IND – Edgerrin James – 4 receptions, 39 yards

==== Week 3: at New York Jets ====
Week Three: Jacksonville Jaguars at New York Jets – Game summary

Quarter	1	2	3	4	OT	Total
**Jaguars**	3	7	3	7	6	**26**
Jets	0	7	7	6	0	**20**

at The Meadowlands, East Rutherford, New Jersey

- Date: September 25, 2005
- Game time: 1:00 p.m. EST
- Game weather: 69 °F (21 °C)
- Game attendance: 77,422
- Referee: Bill Leavy
- TV announcers (CBS): Gus Johnson, Brent Jones
- Recap, Game Book

Game information

**First quarter**

- JAX – Josh Scobee 32-yard field goal, 4:37. Jaguars 3–0. **Drive: 8 plays, 29 yards, 4:26.**

**Second quarter**

- JAX – Ernest Wilford 21-yard pass from Byron Leftwich (Josh Scobee kick), 5:50. Jaguars 10–0. **Drive: 11 plays, 65 yards, 6:17.**
- NYJ – Jerald Sowell 1-yard run (Mike Nugent kick), 1:51 Jaguars 10–7. **Drive: 8 plays, 80 yards, 3:59.**

**Third quarter**

- NYJ – James Reed 33-yard fumble return (Mike Nugent kick), 12:17. Jets 14–10.
- JAX – Josh Scobee 40-yard field goal, 5:05. Jets 14–13. **Drive: 12 plays, 58 yards, 7:12.**

**Fourth quarter**

- JAX – Fred Taylor 3-yard run (Josh Scobee kick), 14:57. Jaguars 20–14. **Drive: 4 plays, 16 yards, 2:05.**
- NYJ – Mike Nugent 35-yard field goal, 9:43. Jaguars 20–17. **Drive: 9 plays, 43 yards, 5:14.**
- NYJ – Mike Nugent 25-yard field goal, 1:14. Tied 20–20. **Drive: 6 plays, 14 yards, 1:48.**

**Overtime**

- JAX – Jimmy Smith 36-yard pass from Byron Leftwich, 8:55. Jaguars 26–20. **Drive: 3 plays, 34 yards, 1:29.**

Top passers

- JAX – Byron Leftwich – 16/23, 177 yards, 2 TD, INT
- NYJ – Chad Pennington – 9/19, 76 yards, 2 INT

Top rushers

- JAX – Fred Taylor – 37 rushes, 98 yards, TD
- NYJ – Curtis Martin – 18 rushes, 67 yards

Top receivers

- JAX – Reggie Williams – 5 receptions, 54 yards
- NYJ – Chris Baker – 3 receptions, 45 yards

==== Week 4: vs. Denver Broncos ====
Week Four: Denver Broncos at Jacksonville Jaguars – Game summary

Quarter	1	2	3	4	Total
**Broncos**	0	14	0	6	**20**
Jaguars	0	0	7	0	**7**

at Alltel Stadium, Jacksonville, Florida

- Date: October 2, 2005
- Game time: 1:00 p.m. EST
- Game weather: 82 °F (28 °C)
- Game attendance: 66,045
- Referee: Tom White
- TV announcers (CBS): Ian Eagle, Solomon Wilcots
- Recap, Game Book

Game information

**First quarter**

- No scoring plays.

**Second quarter**

- DEN – Dwayne Carswell 2-yard pass from Jake Plummer (Jason Elam kick), 6:48. Broncos 7–0. **Drive: 17 plays, 80 yards, 9:15.**
- DEN – Dwayne Carswell 1-yard pass from Jake Plummer (Jason Elam kick), 0:43. Broncos 7–0. **Drive: 8 plays, 64 yards, 3:55.**

**Third quarter**

- JAX – Jimmy Smith 45-yard pass from Byron Leftwich (Josh Scobee kick), 8:52. Broncos 14–7. **Drive: 5 plays, 66 yards, 2:13.**

**Fourth quarter**

- DEN – Jason Elam 33-yard field goal, 8:48. Broncos 17–7. **Drive: 7 plays, 36 yards, 3:29.**
- DEN – Jason Elam 42-yard field goal, 2:42. Broncos 20–7. **Drive: 7 plays, 39 yards, 3:22.**

**Top passers**

- DEN – Jake Plummer – 19/26, 136 yards, 2 TD
- JAX – Byron Leftwich – 20/34, 240 yards, TD, 2 INT

**Top rushers**

- DEN – Mike Anderson – 23 rushes, 115 yards
- JAX – Fred Taylor – 8 rushes, 14 yards

**Top receivers**

- DEN – Rod Smith – 4 receptions, 33 yards
- JAX – Jimmy Smith – 5 receptions, 109 yards, TD

==== Week 5: vs. Cincinnati Bengals ====
Week Five: Cincinnati Bengals at Jacksonville Jaguars – Game summary

Quarter	1	2	3	4	Total
Bengals	0	7	6	7	**20**
**Jaguars**	10	3	7	3	**23**

at Alltel Stadium, Jacksonville, Florida

- Date: October 9, 2005
- Game time: 8:30 p.m. EST
- Game weather: 80 °F (27 °C)
- Game attendance: 66,137
- Referee: Bernie Kukar
- TV announcers (ESPN): Mike Patrick, Paul Maguire, Joe Theismann, Suzy Kolber
- Recap, Game Book

Game information

**First quarter**

- JAX – George Wrighster 26-yard pass from Byron Leftwich (Josh Scobee kick), 10:31. Jaguars 7–0. **Drive: 5 plays, 41 yards, 2:21.**
- JAX – Josh Scobee 32-yard field goal, 0:50. Jaguars 10–0. **Drive: 6 plays, 20 yards, 3:04.**

**Second quarter**

- JAX – Josh Scobee 51-yard field goal, 10:07. Jaguars 13–0. **Drive: 9 plays, 54 yards, 3:52.**
- CIN – Chad Johnson 14-yard pass from Carson Palmer (Shayne Graham kick), 5:36. Jaguars 13–7. **Drive: 17 plays, 80 yards, 9:15.**

**Third quarter**

- JAX – Ernest Wilford 11-yard pass from Byron Leftwich (Josh Scobee kick), 12:16. Jaguars 20–7. **Drive: 6 plays, 62 yards, 2:44.**
- CIN – Shayne Graham 31-yard field goal, 7:05. Jaguars 20–10. **Drive: 10 plays, 56 yards, 5:11.**
- CIN – Shayne Graham 48-yard field goal, 4:29. Jaguars 20–13. **Drive: 4 plays, -9 yards, 2:29.**

**Fourth quarter**

- JAX – Josh Scobee 53-yard field goal, 9:45. Jaguars 23–13. **Drive: 8 plays, 26 yards, 4:35.**
- CIN – Chris Henry 25-yard pass from Carson Palmer (Shayne Graham kick), 5:16. Jaguars 23–20. **Drive: 3 plays, 73 yards, 1:29.**

**Top passers**

- CIN – Carson Palmer – 22/33, 239 yards, 2 TD
- JAX – Byron Leftwich – 10/24, 161 yards, 2 TD

**Top rushers**

- CIN – Rudi Johnson – 18 rushes, 76 yards
- JAX – Fred Taylor – 24 rushes, 132 yards

**Top receivers**

- CIN – Chris Henry – 3 receptions, 85 yards, TD
- JAX – Jimmy Smith – 3 receptions, 43 yards

==== Week 6: at Pittsburgh Steelers ====
Week Six: Jacksonville Jaguars at Pittsburgh Steelers – Game summary

Quarter	1	2	3	4	OT	Total
**Jaguars**	7	3	7	0	6	**23**
Steelers	0	14	0	3	0	**17**

at Heinz Field, Pittsburgh, Pennsylvania

- Date: October 16, 2005
- Game time: 1:00 p.m. EST
- Game weather: Partly cloudy, 56 °F (13 °C)
- Game attendance: 63,891
- Referee: Terry McAulay
- TV announcers (CBS): Dick Enberg, Dan Dierdorf, and Armen Keteyian
- Recap, Game Book

Game information

**First quarter**

- JAX – Greg Jones 7-yard run (Josh Scobee kick), 1:12. Jaguars 7–0. **Drive: 1 play, 7 yards, 0:07.**

**Second quarter**

- PIT – Heath Miller 15-yard pass from Tommy Maddox (Jeff Reed kick), 14:52. Tied 7–7. **Drive: 4 plays, 65 yards, 1:20.**
- PIT – Antwaan Randle El 72-yard punt return (Jeff Reed kick), 13:50. Steelers 14–7.
- JAX – Josh Scobee 23-yard field goal, 0:00. Steelers 14–10. **Drive: 6 plays, 10 yards, 1:43.**

**Third quarter**

- JAX – Matt Jones 10-yard pass from Byron Leftwich (Josh Scobee kick), 11:46. Jaguars 17–14. **Drive: 6 plays, 71 yards, 3:14.**

**Fourth quarter**

- PIT – Jeff Reed 29-yard field goal, 9:38. Tied 17–17. **Drive: 11 plays, 69 yards, 5:14.**

**Overtime**

- JAX – Rashean Mathis 41-yard interception return, 11:24. Jaguars 23–17.

Top passers

- JAX – Byron Leftwich – 19/35, 177 yards, TD, INT
- PIT – Tommy Maddox – 11/28, 154 yards, TD, 3 INT

Top rushers

- JAX – Greg Jones – 18 rushes, 77 yards, TD
- PIT – Willie Parker – 21 rushes, 55 yards

Top receivers

- JAX – Reggie Williams – 3 receptions, 50 yards
- PIT – Heath Miller – 4 receptions, 72 yards, TD

==== Week 8: at St. Louis Rams ====
Week Eight: Jacksonville Jaguars at St. Louis Rams – Game summary

Quarter	1	2	3	4	Total
Jaguars	7	7	7	0	**21**
**Rams**	14	3	0	7	**24**

at Edward Jones Dome, St. Louis, Missouri

- Date: October 30, 2005
- Game time: 12:00 p.m. CST
- Game weather: None (indoor stadium)
- Game attendance: 65,251
- Referee: Walt Anderson
- TV announcers (CBS): Dick Enberg, Dan Dierdorf, Armen Keteyian
- Recap, Game Book

Game information

**First quarter**

- STL – Brandon Chillar 29-yard blocked punt return (Jeff Wilkins kick), 11:47. Rams 7–0.
- JAX – Fred Taylor 71-yard run (Josh Scobee kick), 12:24. Tied 7–7. **Drive: 2 plays, 71 yards, 0:23.**
- STL – Kevin Curtis 83-yard pass from Jamie Martin (Jeff Wilkins kick), 10:54. Rams 14–7. **Drive: 3 plays, 83 yards, 1:30.**

**Second quarter**

- JAX – Ernest Wilford 20-yard pass from Byron Leftwich (Josh Scobee kick), 2:16. Tied 14–14. **Drive: 7 plays, 63 yards, 4:32.**
- STL – Jeff Wilkins 41-yard field goal, 0:00. Rams 17–14. **Drive: 8 plays, 51 yards, 2:16.**

**Third quarter**

- JAX – Matt Jones 15-yard pass from Byron Leftwich (Josh Scobee kick), 5:07. Jaguars 21–17. **Drive: 5 plays, 66 yards, 2:54.**

**Fourth quarter**

- STL – Steven Jackson 19-yard pass from Jamie Martin (Jeff Wilkins kick), 12:45. Rams 24–21. **Drive: 4 plays, 30 yards, 2:00.**

Top passers

- JAX – Byron Leftwich – 18/31, 213 yards, 2 TD, INT
- STL – Jamie Martin – 13/21, 200 yards, 2 TD, 3 INT

Top rushers

- JAX – Fred Taylor – 22 rushes, 165 yards, TD
- STL – Steven Jackson – 25 rushes, 179 yards

Top receivers

- JAX – Ernest Wilford – 6 receptions, 145 yards, TD
- STL – Kevin Curtis – 3 receptions, 105 yards, TD

==== Week 9: vs. Houston Texans ====
Week Nine: Houston Texans at Jacksonville Jaguars – Game summary

Quarter	1	2	3	4	Total
Texans	0	7	7	0	**14**
**Jaguars**	0	0	7	14	**21**

at Alltel Stadium, Jacksonville, Florida

- Date: November 6, 2005
- Game time: 1:00 p.m. EST
- Game weather: 79 °F (26 °C)
- Game attendance: 64,613
- Referee: Gerry Austin
- TV announcers (CBS): Ian Eagle and Solomon Wilcots
- Recap, Game Book

Game information

**First quarter**

- No scoring plays

**Second quarter**

- HOU – Corey Bradford 31-yard pass from David Carr (Kris Brown kick), 10:18. Texans 7–0. **Drive: 10 plays, 88 yards, 5:19.**

**Third quarter**

- JAX – Ernest Wilford 12-yard pass from Byron Leftwich (Josh Scobee kick), 8:46. Tied 7–7. **Drive: 4 plays, 29 yards, 1:27.**
- HOU – Jonathan Wells 7-yard run (Kris Brown kick), 1:19. Texans 14–7. **Drive: 13 plays, 84 yards, 7:27.**

**Fourth quarter**

- JAX – Byron Leftwich 8-yard run (Josh Scobee kick), 10:48. Tied 14–14. **Drive: 10 plays, 80 yards, 5:31.**
- JAX – Greg Jones 12-yard run (Josh Scobee kick), 2:53. Jaguars 21–14. **Drive: 9 plays, 82 yards, 4:50.**

**Top passers**

- HOU – David Carr – 22/30, 219 yards, TD
- JAX – Byron Leftwich – 19/25, 218 yards, TD

**Top rushers**

- HOU – Jonathan Wells – 13 rushes, 56 yards, TD
- JAX – Fred Taylor – 12 rushes, 48 yards

**Top receivers**

- HOU – Andre Johnson – 9 receptions, 91 yards
- JAX – Ernest Wilford – 4 receptions, 89 yards, TD

==== Week 10: vs. Baltimore Ravens ====
Week Ten: Baltimore Ravens at Jacksonville Jaguars – Game summary

Quarter	1	2	3	4	Total
Ravens	3	0	0	0	**3**
**Jaguars**	0	10	7	13	**30**

at Alltel Stadium, Jacksonville, Florida

- Date: November 13, 2005
- Game time: 1:00 p.m. EST
- Game weather: 75 °F (24 °C)
- Game attendance: 66,107
- Referee: Walt Coleman
- TV announcers (CBS): Don Criqui, Steve Beuerlein
- Recap, Game Book

Game information

**First quarter**

- BAL – Matt Stover 41-yard field goal, 5:43. Ravens 3–0. **Drive: 12 plays, 39 yards, 7:00.**

**Second quarter**

- JAX – Matt Jones 32-yard pass from Byron Leftwich (Josh Scobee kick), 6:46. Jaguars 7–3. **Drive: 7 plays, 78 yards, 3:36.**
- JAX – Josh Scobee 48-yard field goal, 0:00. Jaguars 10–3. **Drive: 6 plays, 17 yards, 1:48.**

**Third quarter**

- JAX – Greg Jones 1-yard run (Josh Scobee kick), 11:27. Jaguars 17–3. **Drive: 13 plays, 92 yards, 7:04.**

**Fourth quarter**

- JAX – Josh Scobee 23-yard field goal, 11:37. Jaguars 20–3. **Drive: 8 plays, 43 yards, 4:10.**
- JAX – Josh Scobee 26-yard field goal, 2:40. Jaguars 23–3. **Drive: 8 plays, 54 yards, 3:19.**
- JAX – Mike Peterson 26-yard interception return (Josh Scobee kick), 2:01. Jaguars 30–3.

**Top passers**

- BAL – Kyle Boller – 19/33, 142 yards, 3 INT
- JAX – Byron Leftwich – 16/30, 211 yards, TD

**Top rushers**

- BAL – Jamal Lewis – 14 rushes, 44 yards
- JAX – Greg Jones – 25 rushes, 106 yards, TD

**Top receivers**

- BAL – Todd Heap – 5 receptions, 58 yards
- JAX – Matt Jones – 5 receptions, 117 yards, TD

==== Week 11: at Tennessee Titans ====
Week Eleven: Jacksonville Jaguars at Tennessee Titans – Game summary

Quarter	1	2	3	4	Total
**Jaguars**	0	7	14	10	**31**
Titans	0	14	7	7	**28**

at The Coliseum, Nashville, Tennessee

- Date: November 20, 2005
- Game time: 12:00 p.m. CST
- Game weather: Sunny, 56 °F (13 °C)
- Game attendance: 66,149
- Referee: Scott Green
- TV announcers (CBS): Bill Macatee, Richard Baldinger
- Recap, Game Book

Game information

**First quarter**

- No scoring plays.

**Second quarter**

- TEN – Chris Brown 15-yard pass from Steve McNair (Rob Bironas kick), 7:08. Titans 7–0. **Drive: 12 plays, 57 yards, 6:20.**
- JAX – Kyle Brady 1-yard pass from Byron Leftwich (Josh Scobee kick), 1:10. Tied 7–7. **Drive: 11 plays, 80 yards, 5:58.**
- TEN – Chris Brown 1-yard run (Rob Bironas kick), 0:15. Titans 14–7. **Drive: 4 plays, 11 yards, 0:55.**

**Third quarter**

- JAX – Byron Leftwich 2-yard run (Josh Scobee kick), 8:57. Tied 14–14. **Drive: 11 plays, 61 yards, 6:03.**
- TEN – Antwan Odom 27-yard fumble return (Rob Bironas kick), 7:08. Titans 21–14.
- JAX – Ernest Wilford 18-yard pass from Byron Leftwich (Josh Scobee kick), 4:02. Tied 21–21. **Drive: 7 plays, 79 yards, 3:06.**

**Fourth quarter**

- JAX – Matt Jones 7-yard pass from Byron Leftwich (Josh Scobee kick), 9:21. Jaguars 28–21. **Drive: 11 plays, 89 yards, 6:29.**
- JAX – Josh Scobee 31-yard field goal, 1:52. Jaguars 31–21. **Drive: 10 plays, 31 yards, 2:38.**
- TEN – Roydell Williams 8-yard pass from Steve McNair (Rob Bironas kick), 0:10. Jaguars 31–28. **Drive: 7 plays, 72 yards, 1:42.**

Top passers

- JAX – Byron Leftwich – 22/38, 258 yards, 3 TD
- TEN – Steve McNair – 20/30, 208 yards, 2 TD, INT

Top rushers

- JAX – Greg Jones – 16 rushes, 33 yards
- TEN – Chris Brown – 20 rushes, 61 yards, TD

Top receivers

- JAX – Jimmy Smith – 5 receptions, 89 yards
- TEN – Chris Brown – 4 receptions, 58 yards, TD

==== Week 12: at Arizona Cardinals ====
Week Twelve: Jacksonville Jaguars at Arizona Cardinals – Game summary

Quarter	1	2	3	4	Total
**Jaguars**	7	3	7	7	**24**
Cardinals	0	0	3	14	**17**

at Sun Devil Stadium, Tempe, Arizona

- Date: November 27, 2005
- Game time: 2:05 p.m. MST
- Game weather: Clear, 58 °F (14 °C)
- Game attendance: 39,198
- Referee: Tom White
- TV announcers (CBS): Don Criqui and Steve Beuerlein
- Recap, Game Book

Game information

**First quarter**

- JAX – David Garrard 16-yard run (Josh Scobee kick), 2:45. Jaguars 7–0. **Drive: 10 plays, 67 yards, 7:43.**

**Second quarter**

- JAX – Josh Scobee 30-yard field goal, 2:59. Jaguars 10–0. **Drive: 9 plays, 53 yards, 3:26.**

**Third quarter**

- ARI – Neil Rackers 42-yard field goal, 4:00. Jaguars 10–3. **Drive: 13 plays, 47 yards, 5:54.**
- JAX – Derrick Wimbush 91-yard kickoff return (Josh Scobee kick), 3:43. Jaguars 17–3.

**Fourth quarter**

- ARI – Eric Edwards 1-yard pass from Kurt Warner (Neil Rackers kick), 13:34. Jaguars 17–10. **Drive: 9 plays, 81 yards, 5:04.**
- JAX – Greg Jones 25-yard run (Josh Scobee kick), 4:20. Jaguars 24–10. **Drive: 1 play, 25 yards, 0:07.**
- ARI – Larry Fitzgerald 5-yard pass from Kurt Warner (Neil Rackers kick), 2:56. Jaguars 24–17. **Drive: 4 plays, 77 yards, 1:24.**

**Top passers**

- JAX – David Garrard – 12/26, 115 yards
- ARI – Kurt Warner – 29/46, 315 yards, 2 TD, INT

**Top rushers**

- JAX – Greg Jones – 23 rushes, 78 yards, TD
- ARI – J.J. Arrington – 6 rushes, 39 yards

**Top receivers**

- JAX – Jimmy Smith – 7 receptions, 70 yards
- ARI – Anquan Boldin – 10 receptions, 115 yards

==== Week 13: at Cleveland Browns ====
Week Thirteen: Jacksonville Jaguars at Cleveland Browns – Game summary

Quarter	1	2	3	4	Total
**Jaguars**	3	0	17	0	**20**
Browns	0	14	0	0	**14**

at Cleveland Browns Stadium, Cleveland, Ohio

- Date: December 4, 2005
- Game time: 1:00 p.m. EST
- Game weather: Chilly, 28 °F (−2 °C)
- Game attendance: 70,941
- Referee: Ron Winter
- TV announcers (CBS): Bill Macatee, Rich Gannon
- Recap, Game Book

Game information

**First quarter**

- JAX – Josh Scobee 24-yard field goal, 4:14. Jaguars 3–0. **Drive: 13 plays, 68 yards, 6:46.**

**Second quarter**

- CLE – Braylon Edwards 34-yard pass from Charlie Frye (Phil Dawson kick), 10:41. Browns 7–3. **Drive: 9 plays, 78 yards, 5:20.**
- CLE – Braylon Edwards 17-yard pass from Charlie Frye (Phil Dawson kick), 0:44. Browns 14–3. **Drive: 4 plays, 59 yards, 0:30.**

**Third quarter**

- JAX – Josh Scobee 29-yard field goal, 10:13. Browns 14–6. **Drive: 11 plays, 40 yards, 4:47.**
- JAX – George Wrighster 9-yard pass from David Garrard (Josh Scobee kick), 5:04. Browns 14–13. **Drive: 6 plays, 42 yards, 2:58.**
- JAX – Jimmy Smith 12-yard pass from David Garrard (Josh Scobee kick), 1:11. Jaguars 20–14. **Drive: 4 plays, 79 yards, 1:58.**

**Fourth quarter**

- No scoring plays.

**Top passers**

- JAX – David Garrard – 11/20, 116 yards, 2 TD, INT
- CLE – Charlie Frye – 13/20, 226 yards, 2 TD

**Top rushers**

- JAX – Greg Jones – 27 rushes, 103 yards, TD
- CLE – Reuben Droughns – 30 rushes, 88 yards

**Top receivers**

- JAX – Jimmy Smith – 3 receptions, 49 yards, TD
- CLE – Braylon Edwards – 5 receptions, 86 yards, 2 TD

==== Week 14: vs. Indianapolis Colts ====
Week Fourteen: Indianapolis Colts at Jacksonville Jaguars – Game summary

Quarter	1	2	3	4	Total
**Colts**	7	10	6	3	**26**
Jaguars	0	3	0	15	**18**

at Alltel Stadium, Jacksonville, Florida

- Date: December 11, 2005
- Game time: 1:00 p.m. EST
- Game weather: Cloudy, 55 °F (13 °C)
- Game attendance: 67,164
- Referee: Jeff Triplette
- TV announcers (CBS): Dick Enberg, Dan Dierdorf, Armen Keteyian
- Recap, Game Book

Game information

**First quarter**

- IND – Marvin Harrison 9-yard pass from Peyton Manning (Mike Vanderjagt kick), 4:40. Colts 7–0. **Drive: 11 plays, 89 yards, 5:59.**

**Second quarter**

- JAX – Josh Scobee 27-yard field goal, 14:11. Colts 7–3. **Drive: 6 plays, 17 yards, 1:36.**
- IND – Marvin Harrison 65-yard pass from Peyton Manning (Mike Vanderjagt kick), 9:21. Colts 14–3. **Drive: 1 play, 65 yards, 0:11.**
- IND – Mike Vanderjagt 40-yard field goal, 0:00. Colts 17–3. **Drive: 7 plays, 35 yards, 0:54.**

**Third quarter**

- IND – Mike Vanderjagt 34-yard field goal, 8:14. Colts 20–3. **Drive: 13 plays, 52 yards, 6:46.**
- IND – Mike Vanderjagt 38-yard field goal, 0:45. Colts 23–3. **Drive: 13 plays, 62 yards, 5:59.**

**Fourth quarter**

- IND – Mike Vanderjagt 46-yard field goal, 12:13. Colts 26–3. **Drive: 7 plays, 15 yards, 3:02.**
- JAX – David Garrard 5-yard run (Josh Scobee kick), 4:08. Colts 26–10. **Drive: 10 plays, 67 yards, 7:43.**
- JAX – Jimmy Smith 1-yard pass from David Garrard (run succeeded), 1:54. Colts 26–18. **Drive: 9 plays, 71 yards, 2:14.**

**Top passers**

- IND – Peyton Manning – 24/36, 324 yards, 2 TD
- JAX – David Garrard – 26/35, 250 yards, TD

**Top rushers**

- IND – Edgerrin James – 30 rushes, 93 yards
- JAX – Greg Jones – 7 rushes, 43 yards

**Top receivers**

- IND – Marvin Harrison – 6 receptions, 137 yards, 2 TD
- JAX – Jimmy Smith – 8 receptions, 102 yards, TD

==== Week 15: vs. San Francisco 49ers ====
Week Fifteen: San Francisco 49ers at Jacksonville Jaguars – Game summary

Quarter	1	2	3	4	Total
49ers	3	3	0	3	**9**
**Jaguars**	0	7	0	3	**10**

at Alltel Stadium, Jacksonville, Florida

- Date: December 18, 2005
- Game time: 1:00 p.m. EST
- Game weather: 49 °F (9 °C)
- Game attendance: 64,764
- Referee: Larry Nemers
- TV announcers (Fox): Curt Menefee, J.C. Pearson, and Lee Gordon
- Recap, Game Book

Game information

**First quarter**

- SF – Joe Nedney 35-yard field goal, 10:33. 49ers 3–0. **Drive: 8 plays, 60 yards, 4:27.**

**Second quarter**

- JAX – David Garrard 13-yard run (Josh Scobee kick), 6:26. Jaguars 7–3. **Drive: 12 plays, 71 yards, 6:30.**
- SF – Joe Nedney 47-yard field goal, 0:01. Jaguars 7–6. **Drive: 3 plays, 51 yards, 0:23.**

**Third quarter**

- No scoring plays.

**Fourth quarter**

- SF – Joe Nedney 33-yard field goal, 14:56. 49ers 9–7. **Drive: 8 plays, 42 yards, 4:02.**
- JAX – Josh Scobee 32-yard field goal, 9:41. Jaguars 10–9. **Drive: 10 plays, 47 yards, 5:15.**

**Top passers**

- SF – Alex Smith – 8/24, 123 yards, INT
- JAX – David Garrard – 21/40, 216 yards

**Top rushers**

- SF – Frank Gore – 17 rushes, 61 yards
- JAX – Fred Taylor – 17 rushes, 61 yards

**Top receivers**

- SF – Frank Gore – 3 receptions, 57 yards
- JAX – Jimmy Smith – 6 receptions, 70 yards

External videos
- 2005 49ers at Jaguars - NFL Primetime

==== Week 16: at Houston Texans ====
Week Sixteen: Jacksonville Jaguars at Houston Texans – Game summary

Quarter	1	2	3	4	Total
**Jaguars**	7	3	7	21	**38**
Texans	3	10	0	7	**20**

at Reliant Stadium, Houston, Texas

- Date: December 24, 2005
- Game time: 12:00 p.m. CST
- Game weather: 65 °F (18 °C)
- Game attendance: 70,025
- Referee: Tony Corrente
- TV announcers (CBS): Bill Macatee and Rich Gannon
- Recap, Game Book

Game information

**First quarter**

- JAX – LaBrandon Toefield 1-yard run (Josh Scobee kick), 6:02. Jaguars 7–0. **Drive: 13 plays, 64 yards, 6:53.**
- HOU – Kris Brown 37-yard field goal, 2:21. Jaguars 7–3. **Drive: 8 plays, 61 yards, 3:35.**

**Second quarter**

- HOU – Corey Bradford 50-yard pass from David Carr (Kris Brown kick), 11:43. Texans 10–7. **Drive: 7 plays, 69 yards, 2:17.**
- JAX – Josh Scobee 26-yard field goal, 4:35. Tied 10–10. **Drive: 15 plays, 74 yards, 6:57.**
- HOU – Kris Brown 53-yard field goal, 1:03. Texans 13–10. **Drive: 10 plays, 41 yards, 3:22.**

**Third quarter**

- JAX – LaBrandon Toefield 2-yard run (Josh Scobee kick), 4:03. Jaguars 17–13. **Drive: 8 plays, 63 yards, 3:24.**

**Fourth quarter**

- HOU – Andre Johnson 53-yard pass from David Carr (Kris Brown kick), 12:15. Texans 20–17. **Drive: 3 plays, 66 yards, 1:10.**
- JAX – Fred Taylor 15-yard run (Josh Scobee kick), 9:16. Jaguars 24–20. **Drive: 7 plays, 66 yards, 2:45.**
- JAX – Ernest Wilford 36-yard pass from David Garrard (Josh Scobee kick), 2:37. Jaguars 31–20. **Drive: 7 plays, 62 yards, 3:20.**
- JAX – LaBrandon Toefield 17-yard run (Josh Scobee kick), 1:51. Jaguars 38–20. **Drive: 2 plays, 21 yards, 0:12.**

**Top passers**

- JAX – David Garrard – 18/31, 292 yards, TD
- HOU – David Carr – 19/29, 295 yards, 2 TD, INT

**Top rushers**

- JAX – Fred Taylor – 22 rushes, 101 yards, TD
- HOU – Jonathan Wells – 21 rushes, 86 yards

**Top receivers**

- JAX – Ernest Wilford – 4 receptions, 118 yards, TD
- HOU – Andre Johnson – 7 receptions, 119 yards, TD

==== Week 17: vs. Tennessee Titans ====
Week Seventeen: Tennessee Titans at Jacksonville Jaguars – Game summary

Quarter	1	2	3	4	Total
Titans	0	0	0	13	**13**
**Jaguars**	17	10	13	0	**40**

at Alltel Stadium, Jacksonville, Florida

- Date: January 1, 2006
- Game time: 4:05 p.m. EST
- Game weather: Mostly cloudy, 69 °F (21 °C)
- Game attendance: 65,485
- Referee: Bill Carollo
- TV announcers (CBS): Gus Johnson, Steve Tasker
- Recap, Game Book

Game information

**First quarter**

- JAX – Alvin Pearman 6-yard run (Josh Scobee kick), 11:09. Jaguars 7–0. **Drive: 9 plays, 62 yards, 3:51.**
- JAX – LaBrandon Toefield 32-yard run (Josh Scobee kick), 7:15. Jaguars 14–0. **Drive: 4 plays, 61 yards, 2:05.**
- JAX – Josh Scobee 46-yard field goal, 1:35. Jaguars 17–0. **Drive: 4 plays, 8 yards, 1:32.**

**Second quarter**

- JAX – Josh Scobee 38-yard field goal, 10:13. Jaguars 20–0. **Drive: 4 plays, 5 yards, 1:25.**
- JAX – Derrick Wimbush 6-yard run (Josh Scobee kick), 4:11. Jaguars 27–0. **Drive: 8 plays, 65 yards, 3:54.**

**Third quarter**

- JAX – Matt Jones 10-yard pass from Quinn Gray (Josh Scobee kick), 4:24. Jaguars 34–0. **Drive: 14 plays, 84 yards, 6:30.**
- JAX – George Wrighster 14-yard pass from Quinn Gray (kick failed), 0:34. Jaguars 40–0. **Drive: 13 plays, 77 yards, 6:33.**

**Fourth quarter**

- TEN – Ben Troupe 4-yard pass from Billy Volek (Rob Bironas kick), 9:01. Jaguars 40–7. **Drive: 13 plays, 77 yards, 6:33.**
- TEN – Bo Scaife 10-yard pass from Billy Volek (kick failed), 0:55. Jaguars 40–13. **Drive: 6 plays, 41 yards, 1:53.**

Top passers

- TEN – Billy Volek – 14/25, 114 yards, 2 TD
- JAX – David Garrard – 10/16, 128 yards

Top rushers

- TEN – Travis Henry – 13 rushes, 48 yards
- JAX – LaBrandon Toefield – 25 rushes, 102 yards, TD

Top receivers

- TEN – Ben Troupe – 9 receptions, 89 yards, TD
- JAX – Matt Jones – 3 receptions, 55 yards, TD

=== Standings ===
==== Division ====
AFC South
	W	L	T	PCT	DIV	CONF	PF	PA	STK
^{(1)} Indianapolis Colts	14	2	0	.875	6–0	11–1	439	247	W1
^{(5)} Jacksonville Jaguars	12	4	0	.750	4–2	9–3	361	269	W3
Tennessee Titans	4	12	0	.250	2–4	3–9	299	421	L3
Houston Texans	2	14	0	.125	0–6	1–11	260	431	L2

==== Conference ====
AFC
#	Team	Division	W	L	T	PCT	DIV	CONF	SOS	SOV	STK
**Division leaders**
1	Indianapolis Colts	South	14	2	0	.875	6–0	11–1	.457	.424	W1
2	Denver Broncos	West	13	3	0	.813	5–1	10–2	.500	.471	W4
3 (Note: Cincinnati clinched the AFC North and #3 seed over Pittsburgh based on division record.)	Cincinnati Bengals	North	11	5	0	.688	5–1	7–5	.477	.398	L2
4	New England Patriots	East	10	6	0	.625	5–1	7–5	.508	.400	L1
**Wild cards**
5	Jacksonville Jaguars	South	12	4	0	.750	4–2	9–3	.465	.375	W3
6	Pittsburgh Steelers	North	11	5	0	.688	4–2	7–5	.492	.415	W4
**Did not qualify for the postseason**
7	Kansas City Chiefs	West	10	6	0	.625	4–2	9–3	.504	.475	W2
8 (Note: Miami finished ahead of San Diego based on head-to-head victory.)	Miami Dolphins	East	9	7	0	.563	3–3	7–5	.457	.438	W6
9	San Diego Chargers	West	9	7	0	.563	3–3	7–5	.559	.500	L2
10 (Note: Baltimore finished ahead of Cleveland based on division record.)	Baltimore Ravens	North	6	10	0	.375	2–4	4–8	.523	.375	L1
11	Cleveland Browns	North	6	10	0	.375	1–5	4–8	.508	.396	W1
12	Buffalo Bills	East	5	11	0	.313	2–4	5–7	.500	.450	L1
13 (Note: NY Jets finished ahead of Tennessee based on common record. (2–4 vs. 1–5 against: Miami, Jacksonville, Baltimore, Atlanta, and Oakland). Conference tie break was initially used to eliminate Oakland (see below).)	New York Jets	East	4	12	0	.250	2–4	3–9	.527	.453	W1
14 (Note: Oakland finished ahead of Tennessee based on head-to-head victory.) (Note: While conference record initially eliminated Oakland in the three-way tie with NY Jets, Tennessee, and Oakland, once the NY Jets were ranked above both Tennessee and Oakland, the tiebreaking procedure restarts with the remaining teams, resulting in Oakland ranking above Tennessee.)	Oakland Raiders	West	4	12	0	.250	0–6	2–10	.539	.438	L6
15	Tennessee Titans	South	4	12	0	.250	2–4	3–9	.512	.219	L3
16	Houston Texans	South	2	14	0	.125	0–6	1–11	.535	.344	L2
**Tiebreakers** (Note: When breaking ties for three or more teams under the NFL's rules, they are first broken within divisions, then comparing only the highest ranked remaining team from each division.)

== Postseason ==
=== Schedule ===
Round	Date	Opponent	Result	Record	Venue	Attendance
Wild Card	January 7	at New England Patriots (4)	L 3–28	0–1	Gillette Stadium	68,756

=== Game summaries ===
==== AFC Wild Card Playoffs: at (4) New England Patriots ====
AFC Wild Card Playoffs: (5) Jacksonville Jaguars at (4) New England Patriots – Game summary

Quarter	1	2	3	4	Total
Jaguars	0	3	0	0	3
Patriots	0	7	14	7	28

at Gillette Stadium, Foxborough, Massachusetts

- Date: January 7, 2006
- Game time: 8:00 p.m. EST
- Game weather: Clear, 24 °F (−4 °C)
- Game attendance: 68,756
- Referee: Walt Anderson
- TV announcers (ABC): Al Michaels (play-by-play), John Madden (color commentator), and Michele Tafoya (sideline reporter)
- Recap, Game Book

Game information

First quarter

- No scoring plays

Second quarter

- NE – Troy Brown 11 yard pass from Tom Brady (Adam Vinatieri kick), 12:08. Patriots 7–0. Drive: 6 plays, 37 yards, 2:05
- JAX – Josh Scobee 36 yard field goal, 1:05. Patriots 7–3. Drive: 12 plays, 56 yards, 5:45.

Third quarter

- NE – David Givens 3 yard pass from Tom Brady (Adam Vinatieri kick), 7:13. Patriots 14–3. Drive: 12 plays, 81 yards, 6:42.
- NE – Benjamin Watson 63 yard pass from Tom Brady (Adam Vinatieri kick), 3:03. Patriots 21–3. Drive: 5 plays, 71 yards, 2:53.

Fourth quarter

- NE – Asante Samuel 73 yard interception return (Adam Vinatieri kick), 14:46. Patriots 28–3.

Top passers

- JAX – Byron Leftwich – 18/31, 179 yards, INT
- NE – Tom Brady – 15/27, 201 yards, 3 TD

Top rushers

- JAX – Byron Leftwich – 3 rushes, 26 yards
- NE – Kevin Faulk – 6 rushes, 52 yards

Top receivers

- JAX – Matt Jones – 6 receptions, 94 yards
- NE – Benjamin Watson – 5 receptions, 91 yards, TD
