= Jorge Cordova (American football) =

American football player (born 1981)

No. 58, 51
- Position: Linebacker

Personal information
- Born: September 25, 1981 (age 45); San Diego, California, U.S.
- Listed height: 6 ft 1 in (1.85 m)
- Listed weight: 244 lb (111 kg)

Career information
- High school: Murrieta Valley (Murrieta, California)
- College: Nevada
- NFL draft: 2004: 3rd round, 86th overall pick

Career history
- Jacksonville Jaguars (2004–2006); Miami Dolphins (2007)*; Jacksonville Jaguars (2007); Tennessee Titans (2007)
- * Offseason or practice squad member only

Awards and highlights
- First-team All-WAC (2003)

Career NFL statistics
- Total tackles: 9
- Pass deflections: 1
- Stats at Pro Football Reference

Jorge Cordova (born September 25, 1981) is an American former professional football player who was a linebacker in the National Football League (NFL). Cordova, who is of Mexican–American descent, was selected by the Jacksonville Jaguars in the third round of the 2004 NFL draft. He attended Murrieta Valley High School in Murrieta, California, and graduated class of 1999. He played college football for the Nevada Wolfpack.

== Early life ==
Cordova was born on September 25, 1981, to Jorge Cordova Sr., Alicia Brent and Wade Brent. He was a football standout at Murrieta Valley High School.

== College career ==
Cordova was an impressive defensive prospect from the University of Nevada, totaling 311 tackles with 29.5 sacks, 44 stops for losses, 10 quarterback pressures, five fumble recoveries, eight forced fumbles, seven pass deflections and two blocked kicks in 42 games. He led the Western Athletic Conference (WAC) with nine sacks as a junior. As a senior, he recorded 16 tackles, five sacks, forced a fumble and blocked a field goal in a game against Washington, earning WAC Defensive Player of the Week honors.

== Professional career ==
=== Jacksonville Jaguars ===
Cordova was selected in the 2004 NFL draft by the Jaguars, but tore his ACL during training camp and was placed on injured reserve. In 2005, he showed great promise during the preseason with five tackles, but aggravated his injury and was again placed on injured reserve.

In the 2006 season, Cordova finally made his first career NFL start. Halfway through the game, he was moved from the linebacker position to defensive end to replace the injured Reggie Hayward.

=== Miami Dolphins ===
On August 28, 2007, the Jaguars released him and he signed with the Dolphins.
