= Ernest Wilford =

American football player (born 1979)

No. 19, 18, 85
- Positions: Wide receiver, tight end

Personal information
- Born: January 14, 1979 (age 47); Richmond, Virginia, U.S.
- Listed height: 6 ft 4 in (1.93 m)
- Listed weight: 235 lb (107 kg)

Career information
- High school: Fork Union Military Academy (Fork Union, Virginia)
- College: Virginia Tech
- NFL draft: 2004: 4th round, 120th overall pick

Career history
- Jacksonville Jaguars (2004–2007); Miami Dolphins (2008); Jacksonville Jaguars (2009–2010)

Awards and highlights
- First-team All-Big East (2003); Second-team All-Big East (2002)

Career NFL statistics
- Receptions: 156
- Receiving yards: 2,145
- Receiving touchdowns: 15
- Stats at Pro Football Reference

Ernest Lee Wilford Jr. (born January 14, 1979) is an American former professional football player who was a wide receiver in the National Football League (NFL). He was selected by the Jacksonville Jaguars in the fourth round of the 2004 NFL draft. He played college football for the Virginia Tech Hokies. He is currently a sheriffs deputy with the Jacksonville Sheriff's Office.

Wilford also played for the Miami Dolphins.

== Early life ==
Wilford graduated from Fork Union Military Academy and played football for Armstrong High School in Richmond. He participated in Indoor and Outdoor track, also in Varsity football.

== College career ==
Wilford played college football at Virginia Tech. Wilford graduated as the Hokies' career leader in receptions. He held the team records for most passes caught in a season, most receiving yards in a game, and most touchdown receptions in a game. However, Wilford is probably most remembered for dropping a 2-point conversion pass that would have tied the game with about 6 minutes left against #1 Miami in 2001.

== Professional career ==
=== Pre-draft ===
Wilford attended the NFL Combine.

He measured in at 6'4" 226 pounds. He ran a 4.81 40 yard dash (1.68 10 yard split), a 4.17 20 yard shuttle, and had a vertical jump of 40.5". He also broad jumped 10'10". At his Pro Day, he improved his 40-yard dash to a 4.76.

=== Jacksonville Jaguars (first stint) ===
Wilford was selected by the Jacksonville Jaguars in the fourth round of the 2004 NFL draft with the 120th overall pick.

=== Miami Dolphins ===
Wilford signed with the Miami Dolphins on February 29, 2008. The deal was worth $13 million over four years, and included a $6 million signing bonus. He appeared in seven games for the Dolphins in 2008 (starting none) and caught just three passes for 25 yards.

The Dolphins converted Wilford to tight end during the 2009 offseason, but released him prior to the regular season on August 24.

=== Jacksonville Jaguars (second stint) ===
Wilford re-signed with the Jacksonville Jaguars on August 25, 2009. On May 21, 2010, he cut his hair which had been growing for over six years in recognition of Jacksonville's Wolfson Children's Hospital cancer unit, as a donation.

Wilford was released on September 4, 2010. On Thursday September 16, 2010, the Jaguars re-signed Wilford back to the 53 man roster stating that he provides a veteran who is familiar with the system and can contribute on special teams. Also his salary was not guaranteed, making Wilford a low-risk investment. To make room for him on the roster, the team released wide out John Matthews. Wilford also played tight end in addition to wide receiver.

== NFL career statistics ==
Legend
**Bold**	Career high

=== Regular season ===
Year	Team	Games		Receiving					
Year	Team	GP	GS	Tgt	Rec	Yds	Avg	Lng	TD
2004	JAX	15	3	35	19	271	14.3	**46**	2
2005	JAX	**16**	8	**74**	41	**681**	**16.6**	39	**7**
2006	JAX	**16**	12	**74**	36	524	14.6	41	2
2007	JAX	**16**	**14**	**74**	**45**	518	11.5	35	3
2008	MIA	7	0	6	3	25	8.3	15	0
2009	JAX	15	7	21	11	123	11.2	30	1
2010	JAX	2	0	2	1	3	3.0	3	0
		87	44	286	156	2,145	13.8	46	15

=== Playoffs ===
Year	Team	Games		Receiving					
Year	Team	GP	GS	Tgt	Rec	Yds	Avg	Lng	TD
2005	JAX	1	**1**	**9**	**4**	53	13.3	17	0
2007	JAX	**2**	**1**	7	**4**	**60**	**15.0**	**20**	**1**
		3	2	16	8	113	14.1	20	1

== Incident at Jacksonville Beach club ==
Early in the morning on January 14, 2011, Wilford was arrested for inappropriately touching a female bartender at the Ritz Club in Jacksonville Beach. When confronted by Jacksonville Beach Police and asked to leave, Wilford struggled with police and was eventually tasered twice and arrested. He was released on $5,000 bond later that day and charged with resisting arrest and trespassing. He later pleaded no contest to this charge.

== Jacksonville Sheriff's Office ==
In 2015, Wilford joined the Jacksonville Sheriff's Office as a police officer.

== Coaching career ==
Wilford currently volunteers as an assistant football coach at Tocoi Creek High School in Jacksonville, Florida.
