= Terry Cousin =

American football player (born 1975)

- Cousin in 2005.

No. 24, 21, 22, 25
- Position: Cornerback

Personal information
- Born: April 11, 1975 (age 51); Miami, Florida, U.S.
- Listed height: 5 ft 9 in (1.75 m)
- Listed weight: 185 lb (84 kg)

Career information
- High school: Miami Beach Senior (Miami Beach, Florida)
- College: South Carolina
- NFL draft: 1997: undrafted

Career history
- Chicago Bears (1997–1999); Atlanta Falcons (2000); Miami Dolphins (2001); Carolina Panthers (2002–2003); New York Giants (2004); Jacksonville Jaguars (2005–2007); Cleveland Browns (2008)

Career NFL statistics
- Tackles: 525
- Sacks: 6.5
- Forced fumbles: 5
- Fumble recoveries: 6
- Interceptions: 13
- Stats at Pro Football Reference

Terry Sean Cousin (born March 11, 1975), is an American former professional football player who was a cornerback in the National Football League (NFL). He played college football for the South Carolina Gamecocks and was signed by the Chicago Bears as an undrafted free agent in 1997.

Cousin has also played for the Atlanta Falcons, Miami Dolphins, Carolina Panthers, New York Giants, Jacksonville Jaguars and Cleveland Browns.

== Early life ==
Cousin attended Miami Beach High School in Miami Beach, Florida, and was a student and a letterman in football. in football, as a senior, he was named his team's Offensive M.V.P. and was a first-team All-Dade County selection.

== College career ==
Cousin finished his collegiate career with 203 tackles and five interceptions for the University of South Carolina Gamecocks.

== Professional career ==
Cousin was signed as a free agent in 1997 by the Chicago Bears. He played for the Atlanta Falcons, Miami Dolphins, Carolina Panthers, New York Giants and Jacksonville Jaguars.

In a 1998 game against the Minnesota Vikings, Cousin was covering Cris Carter (then in his 12th year) when the receiver told the cornerback, "When you get on your knees tonight, pray! Pray you can play as long as me!" Cousin would end up playing 12 seasons.

On May 22, 2008, Cousin was signed by the Cleveland Browns, then on February 9, 2009, he was released by the Browns.

== NFL career statistics ==
Legend
**Bold**	Career high

=== Regular season ===
Year	Team	Games		Tackles				Interceptions				Fumbles			
Year	Team	GP	GS	Comb	Solo	Ast	Sck	Int	Yds	TD	Lng	FF	FR	Yds	TD
1997	CHI	6	0	4	2	2	0.0	0	0	0	0	0	0	0	0
1998	CHI	16	12	**62**	**50**	12	0.0	1	0	0	0	1	**2**	0	0
1999	CHI	16	9	57	48	9	0.0	2	1	0	1	1	1	0	0
2000	ATL	15	0	14	13	1	0.0	0	0	0	0	0	0	0	0
2001	MIA	16	3	61	46	15	**2.0**	0	0	0	0	**2**	1	0	0
2002	CAR	16	16	**62**	46	**16**	1.0	2	4	0	4	0	1	**19**	0
2003	CAR	13	13	49	45	4	**2.0**	0	0	0	0	0	0	0	0
2004	NYG	16	5	55	41	14	0.0	1	6	0	6	0	0	0	0
2005	JAX	16	5	47	40	7	0.5	**4**	**18**	0	14	0	1	0	0
2006	JAX	10	4	35	28	7	0.0	1	16	0	**16**	0	0	0	0
2007	JAX	16	2	47	45	2	1.0	1	9	0	9	1	0	0	0
2008	CLE	16	0	32	26	6	0.0	1	4	0	4	0	0	0	0
		172	69	525	430	95	6.5	13	58	0	16	5	6	19	0

=== Playoffs ===
Year	Team	Games		Tackles				Interceptions				Fumbles			
Year	Team	GP	GS	Comb	Solo	Ast	Sck	Int	Yds	TD	Lng	FF	FR	Yds	TD
2001	MIA	1	0	2	0	2	0.0	0	0	0	0	0	0	0	0
2003	CAR	4	1	**15**	**10**	**5**	0.0	0	0	0	0	0	0	0	0
2005	JAX	1	1	1	1	0	0.0	0	0	0	0	0	0	0	0
2007	JAX	2	1	11	9	2	0.0	0	0	0	0	0	0	0	0
		8	3	29	20	9	0.0	0	0	0	0	0	0	0	0

== Post-football career ==
Cousin was formerly a student-athlete mentor at the University of South Carolina, his alma mater. He also served as the sideline reporter for the Gamecock Radio Network's coverage of Carolina Football, working with fellow former Gamecocks Todd Ellis (play-by-play) and Tommy Suggs (analyst), and can be seen on local television discussing the team.

Cousin worked as director of player development at South Carolina for two seasons, before becoming the director of player engagement with the Tampa Bay Buccaneers in 2012. In 2014, Cousin became the Bears' director of player engagement.
