= Josh Scobee =

American football player (born 1982)

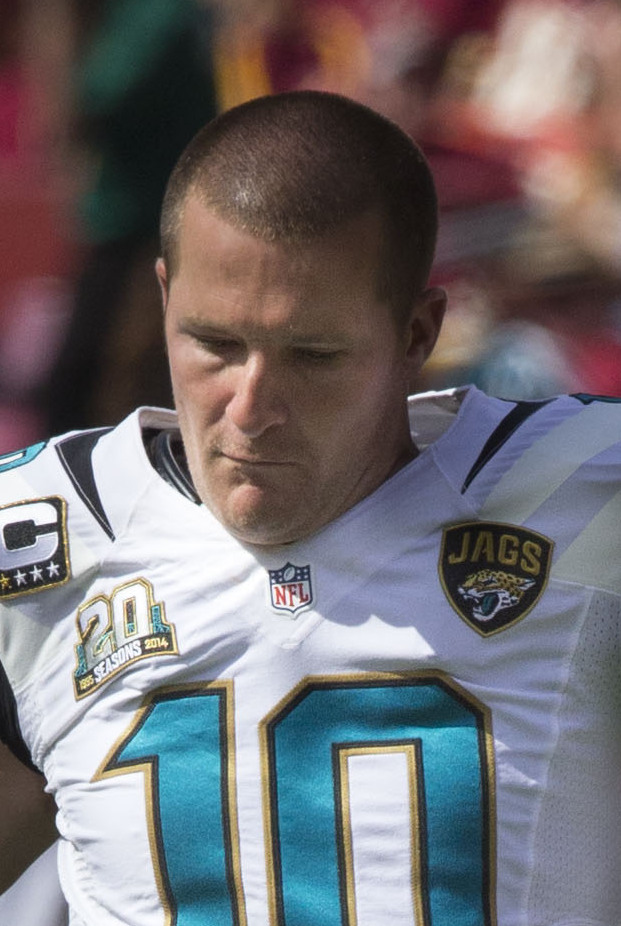
- Scobee with the Jacksonville Jaguars in 2014

No. 10, 8
- Position: Kicker

Personal information
- Born: June 23, 1982 (age 44); Longview, Texas, U.S.
- Listed height: 6 ft 1 in (1.85 m)
- Listed weight: 210 lb (95 kg)

Career information
- High school: Longview
- College: Louisiana Tech (2000–2003)
- NFL draft: 2004: 5th round, 137th overall pick

Career history
- Jacksonville Jaguars (2004–2014); Pittsburgh Steelers (2015); New Orleans Saints (2016)*
- * Offseason or practice squad member only

Career NFL statistics
- Field goals made: 241
- Field goals attempted: 301
- Field goal %: 80.1
- Longest field goal: 59
- Touchbacks: 256
- Stats at Pro Football Reference

Joshua Taylor Scobee SKOH-bee; born June 23, 1982) is an American former professional football player who was a kicker in the National Football League (NFL). He was selected by the Jacksonville Jaguars in the fifth round of the 2004 NFL draft. He also played for the Pittsburgh Steelers. He played college football for the Louisiana Tech Bulldogs, setting several school records.

== Early life ==
Scobee was born in Longview, Texas. He played youth soccer, including outstanding play on the high school team and as part of a competitive league team. He began kicking for the football team his senior year at Longview High School. In addition to handling the kicking duties, Scobee was also the punter. He was 23-for-23 on extra points and was six for nine in the field goal category. He was well known for kicking kickoffs through the uprights. He earned first-team All-District honors as a kicker and second-team All-East Texas accolades as a punter in recognition of his successful season.

== College career ==
After committing to the Louisiana Tech University in Ruston, Louisiana, Scobee won the kicking job as a true freshman with the Bulldogs. He went on to set school career records, as he connected 66 of 92 field goals and 145 of 153 extra point attempts for 343 points, breaking previous marks of 64 field goals by Matt Stover (1986–89), 129 extra points and 279 points by Marty Kent (1994–97). His 343 points rank fourth in WAC annals, topped only by Jason Elam of Hawaii (395), Marshall Faulk of San Diego State (376, 1991–93), and Derek Mahoney of Fresno State (351, 1990–93).

== Professional career ==
=== Jacksonville Jaguars ===
The Jacksonville Jaguars selected Scobee with the 137th overall pick in the fifth round of the 2004 NFL draft. In the 2004 season, he led the team with 93 points after connecting with 24-of-31 field goals and 20-of-21 of his extra points. In addition, he ranked 13th in the AFC in field goal percentage and tied for third on touchbacks with 11 on 58 kickoffs. During his first five NFL seasons, he was named AFC Special Teams Player of the Week four times.

On September 18, 2006, during a Monday Night Football game in front of a near-capacity crowd, Scobee was the only player to score in the Jaguars 9–0 win over the Pittsburgh Steelers. He kicked 3 field goals of 32, 41, and 42 yards to win the game for the Jaguars.

On January 5, 2008, In the Wild Card Round playoff game against the Pittsburgh Steelers, Scobee made the game winning 25-yard field goal. One week later, in the Divisional round, he converted on both of his field goal attempts, kicking a 39-yard and a 25-yard field goal. However, the Jaguars lost to the New England Patriots 31–20. In 2008, during a game against the Indianapolis Colts, Scobee hit a 51-yard field goal to give the Jaguars a 1–2 record, then one week later, he booted a 37-yarder in overtime to beat the Texans. In Week 8, Scobee tied his career record with a 53-yard field goal against Cleveland.

In Week 4 of the 2010 season, Scobee made a 59-yard game-winning field goal on the final play of the game to beat the Indianapolis Colts by a score of 31–28, breaking his previous record of 53 yards. The 59-yard field goal set a new franchise record for the Jaguars. For his performance he earned the AFC Special Teams Player of the Week award.

On October 24, 2011, he kicked four field goals to lead Jacksonville to a 12–7 victory over the Baltimore Ravens on Monday Night Football. Three of his field goals were over 50 yards in length, including two field goals of 54 yards each. Scobee's three 50+ yard field goals tied an NFL record for most 50+ yard field goals in a single game with five other kickers including Neil Rackers, Morten Andersen, and Sebastian Janikowski.

On July 16, 2012, Scobee agreed to a four-year deal with the Jacksonville Jaguars after receiving a franchise tag earlier in the year.

Scobee stayed with the Jaguars through the 2014 season. In the 2014 season, he converted all 23 extra point attempts and 20 of 26 field goal attempts.

=== Pittsburgh Steelers ===
On August 31, 2015, Scobee was traded to the Pittsburgh Steelers for a sixth-round pick in the 2016 NFL draft. He was Pittsburgh's third kicker of the preseason after Shaun Suisham and Garrett Hartley suffered season-ending (and in Suisham's case, career-ending) injuries. He made his debut in the Steelers' Week 1 game against the New England Patriots, missing his first two field goal attempts (44 and 46 yards), before scoring an extra point and two field goals (including a 44-yard attempt) in the Steelers' 28–21 loss.

In the Steelers' Week 4 game against their AFC North rival Baltimore Ravens, the Steelers led 20–17 late in the fourth quarter. Scobee missed two field goals—a 49-yarder and later a 41-yarder—in the closing minutes. The Ravens then kicked a field goal to tie the game at 20, sending the game to overtime. Ravens kicker Justin Tucker made a 52-yard field goal on the Ravens' next drive to hand the Steelers a 23–20 overtime loss. Two days later, the Steelers released Scobee, replacing him with Chris Boswell

=== New Orleans Saints ===
Scobee signed a one-year deal with the New Orleans Saints on March 4, 2016. He was released by the team on May 17, 2016.

=== Retirement ===
On April 13, 2017, Scobee signed a one-day contract to retire as a member of the Jacksonville Jaguars.

== NFL career statistics ==
Year	Team	GP	Field goals				Extra points			Points
Year	Team	GP	FGA	FGM	Lng	Pct	XPA	XPM	Pct	Points
2004	JAX	16	31	24	53	77.4	21	21	100.0	93
2005	JAX	16	30	23	53	76.7	39	38	97.4	107
2006	JAX	16	32	26	48	81.3	31	31	100.0	119
2007	JAX	8	13	12	48	92.3	27	26	96.3	62
2008	JAX	16	25	19	53	76.0	33	33	100.0	90
2009	JAX	16	28	18	52	64.3	31	30	96.8	84
2010	JAX	16	28	22	59	78.6	41	41	100.0	107
2011	JAX	16	25	23	55	92.0	24	24	100.0	93
2012	JAX	16	28	25	50	89.3	19	18	94.7	93
2013	JAX	16	25	23	55	92.0	23	22	95.7	91
2014	JAX	16	26	20	53	76.9	23	23	100.0	83
2015	PIT	4	10	6	45	60.0	7	6	85.7	24
Career		172	301	241	59	80.1	329	323	98.2	1,046

== Personal life ==
He is married to Melissa Scobee and has two sons. In his spare time, he enjoys golfing, fishing, and hunting.
