= Reggie Hayward =

American football player (born 1979)

No. 98, 97
- Position: Defensive end

Personal information
- Born: March 14, 1979 (age 47); Dolton, Illinois, U.S.
- Listed height: 6 ft 5 in (1.96 m)
- Listed weight: 265 lb (120 kg)

Career information
- High school: Thornridge (Dolton)
- College: Iowa State
- NFL draft: 2001: 3rd round, 87th overall pick

Career history
- Denver Broncos (2001–2004); Jacksonville Jaguars (2005–2009)

Awards and highlights
- Second-team All-Big 12 (2000)

Career NFL statistics
- Total tackles: 177
- Sacks: 39.5
- Forced fumbles: 7
- Fumble recoveries: 5
- Interceptions: 1
- Stats at Pro Football Reference

Reginald Joseph Hayward Jr. (born March 14, 1979) is an American former professional football player who was a defensive end for nine seasons in the National Football League (NFL) for the Denver Broncos and Jacksonville Jaguars. He played college football for the Iowa State Cyclones, and was selected by the Broncos in the third round of the 2001 NFL draft.

== Early life ==
Hayward grew up in Dolton, IL a small town 10 minutes south of Chicago. He attended Thornridge High School, where he also lettered in track, football and basketball.

== College career ==
Hayward was a three-year starter at Iowa State University, where he was a first-team All-Big 12 Conference selection and the Arthur Floyd Scott Award winner during his senior year.

== Professional career ==
=== Denver Broncos ===
Hayward was drafted by the Denver Broncos in the third round of the 2001 NFL draft. Hayward played four seasons with Denver.

=== Jacksonville Jaguars ===
Hayward was signed by the Jacksonville Jaguars as an unrestricted free agent on March 2, 2005.

In his first year as a Jaguar, Hayward accumulated 33 tackles (27 solo), 8.5 sacks, and six pass deflections in 15 games. He is also credited with two forced fumbles in the 2005 NFL season. Unfortunately, at the start of the 2006 season, Hayward suffered a season-ending injury to his Achilles tendon and was placed on injured reserve.

In 2009, in the first game of the season, Hayward broke his fibula and was out for the rest of the season. Before the injury he had already recorded a sack and two tackles. He was re-signed on April 1, 2010.

Hayward was released by the Jaguars on July 7, 2010.

== NFL career statistics ==
Legend
**Bold**	Career high

=== Regular season ===
Year	Team	Games		Tackles					Interceptions					Fumbles			
Year	Team	GP	GS	Cmb	Solo	Ast	Sck	TFL	Int	Yds	TD	Lng	PD	FF	FR	Yds	TD
2001	DEN	6	2	18	15	3	3.0	4	0	0	0	0	0	0	0	0	0
2002	DEN	9	0	9	6	3	0.0	1	0	0	0	0	0	0	0	0	0
2003	DEN	**16**	2	30	26	4	8.5	9	0	0	0	0	5	**2**	**2**	0	0
2004	DEN	**16**	**15**	**43**	**31**	**12**	**10.5**	**13**	**1**	**76**	0	**76**	3	1	1	0	0
2005	JAX	15	**15**	33	27	6	8.5	10	0	0	0	0	**6**	1	1	0	0
2006	JAX	1	1	0	0	0	0.0	0	0	0	0	0	0	0	0	0	0
2007	JAX	12	10	18	15	3	3.5	5	0	0	0	0	1	1	0	0	0
2008	JAX	**16**	13	24	22	2	4.5	11	0	0	0	0	3	**2**	1	**4**	0
2009	JAX	1	1	2	2	0	1.0	1	0	0	0	0	0	0	0	0	0
		92	59	177	144	33	39.5	54	1	76	0	76	18	7	5	4	0

=== Playoffs ===
Year	Team	Games		Tackles					Interceptions					Fumbles			
Year	Team	GP	GS	Cmb	Solo	Ast	Sck	TFL	Int	Yds	TD	Lng	PD	FF	FR	Yds	TD
2003	DEN	1	0	3	**3**	0	0.0	0	0	0	0	0	0	0	**1**	0	0
2004	DEN	1	**1**	2	1	1	**1.0**	**1**	0	0	0	0	0	0	0	0	0
2005	JAX	1	**1**	**4**	2	**2**	**1.0**	**1**	0	0	0	0	0	**1**	0	0	0
2007	JAX	**2**	0	**4**	**3**	1	0.0	**1**	0	0	0	0	**1**	0	0	0	0
		5	2	13	9	4	2.0	3	0	0	0	0	1	1	1	0	0
