= Pat Thomas (linebacker) =

American football player (born 1983)

No. 53, 55, 59, 54
- Position: Linebacker

Personal information
- Born: January 26, 1983 (age 43); Miami, Florida, U.S.
- Listed height: 6 ft 1 in (1.85 m)
- Listed weight: 237 lb (108 kg)

Career information
- High school: Miami Killian (Kendall, Florida)
- College: North Carolina State
- NFL draft: 2005: 6th round, 194th overall pick

Career history
- Jacksonville Jaguars (2005–2007); Kansas City Chiefs (2007–2008); Buffalo Bills (2009)*; Omaha Nighthawks (2010–2011)
- * Offseason or practice squad member only

Awards and highlights
- Second-team All-ACC (2003)

Career NFL statistics
- Total tackles: 72
- Sacks: 0.5
- Forced fumbles: 1
- Stats at Pro Football Reference

Patrick Wain Thomas (born January 26, 1983) is an American former professional football player who was a linebacker in the National Football League (NFL). He played college football for the NC State Wolfpack and was selected by the Jacksonville Jaguars in the sixth round of the 2005 NFL draft.

== Early life ==
Thomas was born in Miami, Florida.

== College career ==
Thomas attended North Carolina State University. In 50 career games at North Carolina State University with 36 starts, he recorded 334 tackles, 38 tackles for a loss, 15.5 sacks and five forced fumbles.

== Professional career ==
Thomas was selected by the Jacksonville Jaguars in the sixth round (20th pick) of the 2005 NFL draft.
