= Carl Smith (American football) =

American football coach (born 1948)

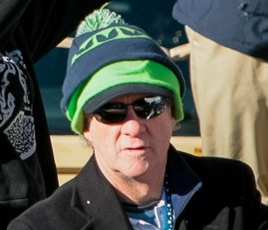
- Smith at Seahawks' Super Bowl XLVIII parade in 2014

Carolina Panthers
- Title: Senior assistant

Personal information
- Born: April 26, 1948 (age 78); Wasco, California, U.S.

Career information
- High school: Wasco Union
- College: Cal Poly

Career history
- Cal Poly (1971) Graduate assistant; Colorado (1972–1973) Graduate assistant / linebackers; Southwestern Louisiana (1974) Defensive backs coach; Southwestern Louisiana (1975–1976) Defensive line coach; Southwestern Louisiana (1977–1978) Offensive coordinator; Lamar (1979–1980) Offensive coordinator; Lamar (1981) Offensive coordinator & offensive line coach; NC State (1982) Offensive coordinator; Philadelphia Stars (1983) Special teams coach; Baltimore Stars (1984–1985) Quarterbacks coach & wide receivers coach; New Orleans Saints (1986–1996) Offensive coordinator & quarterbacks coach; New England Patriots (1997) Assistant head coach & quarterbacks coach; New England Patriots (1998–1999) Tight ends coach; Cleveland Browns (2001–2003) Quarterbacks coach; USC (2004) Quarterbacks coach; Jacksonville Jaguars (2005–2006) Offensive coordinator; Cleveland Browns (2009–2010) Quarterbacks coach; Seattle Seahawks (2011–2017) Quarterbacks coach; Seattle Seahawks (2018) Associate head coach; Houston Texans (2019) Quarterbacks coach; Houston Texans (2020) Offensive consultant; Seattle Seahawks (2021–2023) Associate head coach; Carolina Panthers (2026–present) Senior assistant

Awards and highlights
- Super Bowl champion (XLVIII); Southland Conference champion (1976)
- Coaching profile at Pro Football Reference

Carl Hamilton Smith (born April 26, 1948) is an American football coach who is a senior assistant for the Carolina Panthers of the National Football League (NFL). Smith formerly was the associate head coach for the Seattle Seahawks. He had previously served as quarterbacks coach of the Cleveland Browns and offensive coordinator for the NFL's Jacksonville Jaguars and New Orleans Saints.

== Early life ==
Smith attended Wasco Union High School in Wasco, California.

== College career ==
Smith started his college playing career at Bakersfield College, a junior college in Bakersfield, California, where he played quarterback from 1966 to 1967. He transferred to Cal Poly San Luis Obispo, where he played two seasons at defensive back from 1969 to 1970. Smith earned his bachelor's (1971) and master's (1972) degrees in physical education from Cal Poly, as well as a teaching credential.

== Coaching career ==
From 1997 to 1999, Smith was an assistant coach for the New England Patriots, at the time led by head coach Pete Carroll.

Smith was fired from the Jaguars on January 2, 2007. After taking two years off from football, he was hired on January 6, 2009, to be the quarterbacks coach at USC; he had held the position for the 2004 season, when the Trojans won a national championship and quarterback Matt Leinart won the Heisman Trophy. However, after only two weeks on the job, he left USC to join the Cleveland Browns.

Smith was hired to be quarterbacks coach of the Seahawks, effective February 24, 2011. He won his first Super Bowl title when the Seahawks defeated the Denver Broncos in Super Bowl XLVIII.

On February 5, 2019, Smith was hired as the quarterbacks coach for the Houston Texans. The Seahawks brought him back as the team's associate head coach on March 3, 2021.

On May 18, 2026, the Carolina Panthers hired Smith to serve as the team's top senior advisor.
