= Derrick Wimbush =

American football player (born 1980)

No. 36
- Position: Fullback

Personal information
- Born: August 26, 1980 (age 46); Americus, Georgia, U.S.
- Listed height: 6 ft 1 in (1.85 m)
- Listed weight: 226 lb (103 kg)

Career information
- High school: Taylor County (Butler, Georgia)
- College: Georgia Military; Fort Valley State
- NFL draft: 2005: undrafted

Career history
- Jacksonville Jaguars (2005–2007); Albany Panthers (2012–2013); Georgia Fire (2014)*; Georgia Firebirds (2016–17)
- * Offseason or practice squad member only

Awards and highlights
- PIFL champion (2012); Second-team All-PIFL (2012)

Career NFL statistics
- Rushing attempts: 4
- Rushing yards: 15
- Rushing touchdowns: 1
- Receptions: 9
- Receiving yards: 49
- Return yards: 1,136
- Return touchdowns: 1
- Stats at Pro Football Reference

Derrick Wimbush (born August 26, 1980) is an American former professional football player who was a fullback in the National Football League (NFL). He played college football for the Fort Valley State Wildcats in Fort Valley, Georgia. Wimbush finished his senior season with 1,840 rushing yards and 22 touchdowns and his career with 3,188 rushing yards. Wimbush was runner up for the 2004 Harlon Hill Trophy given to best player in NCAA Division II. During his brief career with the Jacksonville Jaguars, Wimbush rarely carried the ball, however his blocking, and his play on special teams has contributed to a highly skilled, rushing attack from the Jaguars. In 2016, Wimbush signed with the Georgia Firebirds of American Indoor Football (AIF). He also played for the Georgia Firebirds of the National Arena League (NAL).
