= Chris Roberson (American football) =

American football player (born 1983)

No. 38, 33
- Position: Cornerback

Personal information
- Born: June 3, 1983 (age 43); Detroit, Michigan, U.S.
- Listed height: 5 ft 11 in (1.80 m)
- Listed weight: 190 lb (86 kg)

Career information
- High school: Harrison (Farmington Hills, Michigan)
- College: Eastern Michigan (2001–2004)
- NFL draft: 2005: 7th round, 237th overall pick

Career history
- Jacksonville Jaguars (2005–2006); Miami Dolphins (2008)*; Detroit Lions (2008); Philadelphia Eagles (2009)*; Cleveland Browns (2010)*; Virginia Destroyers (2011)*
- * Offseason or practice squad member only

Career NFL statistics
- Total tackles: 3
- Stats at Pro Football Reference

Christopher Robert Roberson (born June 3, 1983) is an American former professional football player who was a cornerback in the National Football League (NFL). He was selected by the Jacksonville Jaguars in the seventh round of the 2005 NFL draft. He played college football at Eastern Michigan.

Roberson was also a member of the Miami Dolphins, Detroit Lions, Philadelphia Eagles, Cleveland Browns, and Virginia Destroyers.

== Early life ==
Christopher Robert Roberson was born on June 3, 1983, in Detroit, Michigan. He attended Harrison High School in Farmington Hills, Michigan.

== College career ==
Roberson lettered for the Eastern Michigan Eagles of Eastern Michigan University from 2001 to 2004. He began his college career as a running back in 2001, rushing 167 times for 755 yards and three touchdowns while catching 23 passes for 91 yards and one touchdown and returning 12 kickoffs for 277 yards. Roberson moved to wide receiver as a sophomore in 2002, totaling 40 receptions for 379 yards and seven touchdowns, 21 punt returns for 232 yards and one touchdown, and 16 kickoff returns for 328 yards. He stayed at wide receiver as a junior in 2003, catching 34 passes for 338 yards and two touchdowns. Roberson moved to defensive back for his final season in 2004.

== Professional career ==
=== Jacksonville Jaguars ===
Roberson was selected by the Jacksonville Jaguars in the seventh round, with the 237th overall pick, of the 2005 NFL draft. He officially signed with the team on June 16, 2005. He was waived on August 30 and signed to the Jaguars' practice squad on September 5. He was promoted to the active roster on November 22 and played in six games during the 2005 season, recording one solo tackle and one assisted tackle.

Roberson was placed on injured reserve on August 29, 2006, and spent the entire 2006 season there. He was released on July 28, 2007.

=== Miami Dolphins ===
Roberson signed with the Miami Dolphins on July 30, 2008, and was waived on August 22, 2008.

=== Detroit Lions ===
Roberson was signed to the practice squad of the Detroit Lions on October 8, 2008. He was promoted to the active roster on December 16 and appeared in one game for the Lions during the 2008 season, totaling one solo tackle. He was placed on injured reserve on September 5, 2009 and was released on September 11, 2009.

=== Philadelphia Eagles ===
Roberson was signed to the Philadelphia Eagles' practice squad on December 2, 2009.

=== Cleveland Browns ===
Roberson signed a reserve/future contract with the Cleveland Browns on January 19, 2010. He was placed on injured reserve on August 7, 2010 and was released on August 13, 2010.

=== Virginia Destroyers ===
Roberson signed with the Virginia Destroyers of the United Football League (UFL) in 2011. He was released on September 12 before the start of the 2011 UFL season.
