= Brian Jones (tight end) =

American football player (born 1981)

No. 86
- Position: Tight end

Personal information
- Born: August 23, 1981 (age 45); Bastrop, Louisiana, U.S.
- Listed height: 6 ft 3 in (1.91 m)
- Listed weight: 258 lb (117 kg)

Career information
- High school: Bastrop
- College: Arkansas-Pine Bluff
- NFL draft: 2004: undrafted

Career history
- Jacksonville Jaguars (2004–2006); New England Patriots (2007)*
- * Offseason or practice squad member only

Career NFL statistics
- Receptions: 9
- Receiving yards: 136
- Receiving TDs: 1
- Stats at Pro Football Reference

Brian Tavarus Jones (born August 23, 1981) is an American former professional football player who was a tight end in the National Football League (NFL). After playing college football for the Louisiana–Lafayette Ragin' Cajuns and Arkansas–Pine Bluff Golden Lions, Jones was signed as an undrafted free agent by the Jacksonville Jaguars in 2004. Jones was also a member of the New England Patriots.

== Early life ==
Jones played high school football at Bastrop High School, where he recorded 30 receptions for 500 yards and eight touchdowns as a senior and earned All-District and All-State honors.

== College career ==
Jones then attended the University of Louisiana at Lafayette where he played in eight games, starting two as a freshman and caught six passes for 38 yards. He played in 11 games as a sophomore a caught five passes for 30 yards. He then sat out the 2001 season after transferring from Louisiana-Lafayette to University of Arkansas at Pine Bluff. He started 10 games as a junior and had 35 receptions for 421 yards and three touchdowns. He started in 10 games as a senior, where he caught 30 passes for 493 yards and three touchdowns.

== Professional career ==
Jones was signed as an undrafted free agent in 2004 by the Jacksonville Jaguars. In 2004, he played in all 16 games, catching six passes for 87 yards and one touchdown.
