= George Wrighster =

American football player (born 1981)

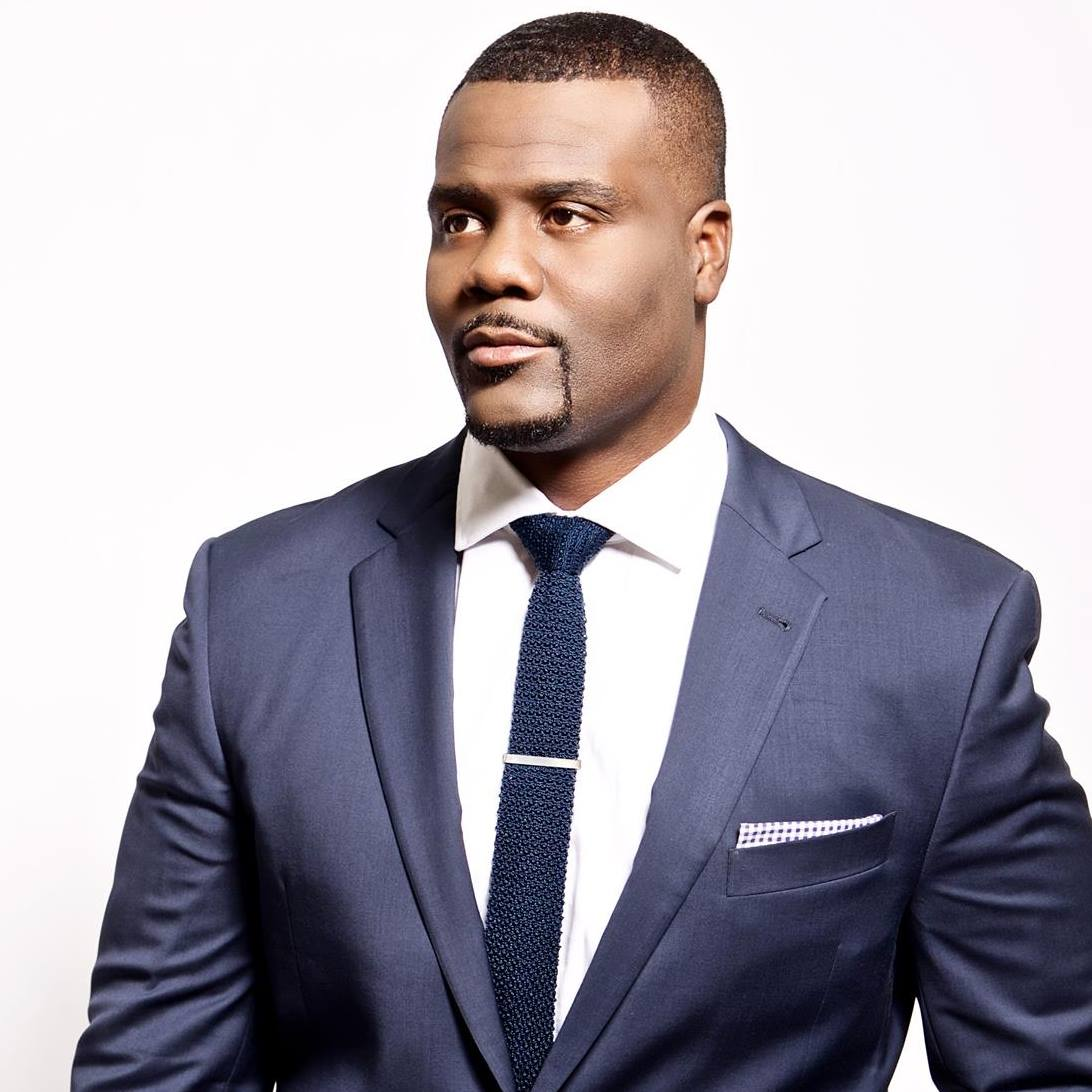
- Wrighster in 2020

No. 87, 84
- Position: Tight end

Personal information
- Born: April 1, 1981 (age 45); Memphis, Tennessee, U.S.
- Listed height: 6 ft 3 in (1.91 m)
- Listed weight: 255 lb (116 kg)

Career information
- High school: Sylmar (Sylmar, California)
- College: Oregon
- NFL draft: 2003: 4th round, 104th overall pick

Career history
- Jacksonville Jaguars (2003–2008); New York Giants (2009)*; Las Vegas Locomotives (2010)
- * Offseason or practice squad member only

Awards and highlights
- UFL champion (2010); Second-team All-Pac-10 (2002)

Career NFL statistics
- Receptions: 94
- Receiving yards: 850
- Receiving touchdowns: 9
- Stats at Pro Football Reference

George Frederick Wrighster III (born April 1, 1981) is an American former professional football player who was a tight end in the National Football League (NFL). He was selected 104th overall by the Jacksonville Jaguars in the fourth round of the 2003 NFL draft. He played college football for the Oregon Ducks. Wrighster was also a member of the New York Giants and Las Vegas Locomotives. He is currently a studio analyst with CW Sports since 2025.

== Professional career ==
Pre-draft measurables
Height	Weight	Arm length	Hand span	40-yard dash	Three-cone drill	Vertical jump
6 ft 2 7/8 in (1.90 m)	249 lb (113 kg)	33 1/2 in (0.85 m)	10 in (0.25 m)	4.58 s	7.24 s	37 1/2 in (0.95 m)
All values from NFL Combine.

Wrighster was selected by the Jacksonville Jaguars in the fourth round (104th overall) of the 2003 NFL draft. He played six seasons primarily as a starter with the team before being released on April 3, 2009. He often showed flashes of greatness, but missed 30 games due to injury. Wrighster was signed by the New York Giants on May 9, 2009, after attending the team's minicamp. He was waived on June 24, 2009.

Wrighster played for the Las Vegas Locomotives in 2010.

== Broadcasting career ==
After his professional football career ended, Wrighster entered the field of sports broadcasting. Beginning in September 2014, George hosted a Los Angeles-based daily afternoon radio show called "The Drive" on The Beast 980 KFWB. In August 2015, Wrighster debuted on Fox Sports 1 as a sports analyst and opinionist on such shows as "Fox Sports Live Countdown" and "Kickoff To Countdown.' He has also been the game analyst for multiple games on ESPN3 and FS1.

Wrighster launched the Unafraid Show, a Youtube show featuring interviews of top athletes, coaches, and celebrities alongside great sports content in 2024.

Wrighster debuted on Mad Dog Sports Radio’s “NightCap” on SiriusXM on Tuesday December 8, 2020.

He began as a studio analyst with CW Sports in 2025 as part of the network's debut season of its CW Football Saturday Countdown pregame show. He was promoted to lead studio analyst the following year.

== Personal life ==
Wrighster attended Sylmar High School in Los Angeles, California. He also attended The Buckley School in Sherman Oaks, California.

He appeared on the March 11, 2012, episode of Cupcake Wars on the Food Network representing Violet's Cakes in Pasadena, California.

George married to Danisha Wrighster and they have a blended family with 5 kids.
