= Alvin Pearman =

American football player (born 1982)

No. 34, 36, 39, 35
- Positions: Running back, return specialist

Personal information
- Born: August 10, 1982 (age 44); Princeton, New Jersey, U.S.
- Listed height: 5 ft 10 in (1.78 m)
- Listed weight: 204 lb (93 kg)

Career information
- High school: Charlotte Country Day (NC)
- College: Virginia
- NFL draft: 2005: 4th round, 127th overall pick

Career history
- Jacksonville Jaguars (2005–2006); Seattle Seahawks (2007); Jacksonville Jaguars (2008); Tennessee Titans (2009)

Awards and highlights
- First-team All-ACC (2004)

Career NFL statistics
- Rushing attempts: 58
- Rushing yards: 238
- Receptions: 36
- Receiving yards: 276
- Return yards: 1,293
- Total touchdowns: 3
- Stats at Pro Football Reference

Francis Alvin Pearman, II (born August 10, 1982) is an American educator and former professional football player who was a running back in the National Football League (NFL). He played college football for the Virginia Cavaliers and was selected by the Jacksonville Jaguars in the fourth round of the 2005 NFL draft. During his NFL career, he played for the Jaguars, Seattle Seahawks, and Tennessee Titans.

He is currently an assistant professor at Stanford University Graduate School of Education. He received his B.S. from the University of Virginia in 2005.

== Professional career ==
=== Jacksonville Jaguars (first stint) ===
Pearman was selected by the Jacksonville Jaguars in the fourth round (127th overall) of the 2005 NFL draft. He wore number 34 while with the team.

As a rookie, Pearman carried the ball 39 times for 149 yards and a touchdown. He also caught 32 passes for 240 yards. Pearman handled the bulk of the team's punt returns during the season, averaging 8.4 yards on 49 attempts. He finished the 2005 regular season with 986 all-purpose yards. In his first NFL game, he forced a fumble on the opening kickoff which ultimately led to a field goal.

=== Seattle Seahawks ===
On September 1, 2007, Pearman was traded to the Seattle Seahawks for a sixth-round draft choice. After suffering a knee injury, the team placed him on injured reserve on October 2, 2007.

=== Jacksonville Jaguars (second stint) ===
Pearman was re-signed by the Jaguars on December 11, 2008, after running back Fred Taylor was placed on injured reserve. Pearman scored a 23-yard receiving touchdown, his only reception of the season, in the season finale against the Baltimore Ravens. The team waived Pearman on September 5, 2009.

=== Tennessee Titans ===
Pearman signed with the Tennessee Titans on October 30, 2009, and was assigned jersey number 35. During the 2009 season, Pearman played in 5 games, returned 11 punts for 112 yards (10.2 average) and 8 kickoffs for 174 yards (21.8 average). He also registered 4 tackles. At the start of the 2010–2011 season, Pearman was listed as third on the team's running back depth chart behind Chris Johnson and Javon Ringer.

== Personal life ==
At the conclusion of his NFL career, Pearman earned a M.Ed. and Ph.D. from Vanderbilt University. He is currently an assistant professor of education in the Graduate School of Education at Stanford University. He was previously a professor of Urban Education at the University of Pittsburgh.
