= Walter Curry (gridiron football) =

American gridiron football player (born 1981)

No. 96
- Position: Defensive tackle

Personal information
- Born: June 18, 1981 (age 45); Crescent City, Florida, U.S.
- Listed height: 6 ft 3 in (1.91 m)
- Listed weight: 294 lb (133 kg)

Career information
- High school: Crescent City
- College: Albany State University

Career history
- 2005: Baltimore Ravens*
- 2005–2007: Jacksonville Jaguars*
- 2008: San Francisco 49ers*
- 2008: San Jose SaberCats*
- 2008–2009: Toronto Argonauts
- 2010: Jacksonville Jaguars*
- 2010: Toronto Argonauts
- 2010: Edmonton Eskimos
- 2011: Omaha Nighthawks
- 2012: Orlando Predators
- * Offseason or practice squad member only
- Stats at CFL.ca (archive)

Walter Morrell Curry, Jr. (born June 18, 1981) is an American former professional football defensive tackle. He was signed by the Baltimore Ravens as an undrafted free agent in 2005. He played college football at Albany State University.

Curry was a member of the Baltimore Ravens, Jacksonville Jaguars, San Francisco 49ers, San Jose SaberCats, Toronto Argonauts, Edmonton Eskimos, Omaha Nighthawks, and Orlando Predators].

== Early life ==
Curry attended Crescent City High School in Crescent City, Florida and was a letterman in football and basketball.
