= 2004 Detroit Lions season =

NFL team season

- Owner: William Clay Ford Sr.
- General manager: Matt Millen
- Head coach: Steve Mariucci
- Home stadium: Ford Field

Results
- Record: 6–10
- Division place: 3rd NFC North
- Playoffs: Did not qualify
- Pro Bowlers: DT Shaun Rogers; CB Dre' Bly; KR Eddie Drummond

Uniform

The 2004 season was the Detroit Lions' 75th season in the National Football League (NFL), their 71st as the Detroit Lions, their third playing home games at Ford Field, and their second under head coach Steve Mariucci. The Lions improved on their 5–11 record from the previous season after a Week 16 matchup versus the Chicago Bears, but they missed the playoffs for the fifth straight season.

A promising 4–2 start was followed by a five-game losing streak and a 2–8 record to finish 6–10. The team finished bottom-tier in offense and mid-tier in defense. Three Lions were named to the Pro Bowl: cornerback Dré Bly, return specialist Eddie Drummond, and defensive tackle Shaun Rogers. In their opening game, the Lions won on the road, snapping an NFL-record 24 game losing streak on the road. The Lions would hold this record until they lost 26 straight across four consecutive seasons: 2007, 2008, 2009, and 2010.

Third-year quarterback Joey Harrington led the passing game by throwing 12 interceptions – down from a league-high 22 the previous season – while setting a career high with 3,047 passing yards. In the first game of the season, 2003 second-overall pick Charles Rogers broke his collarbone, sidelining him for the rest of the season. Rookie running back Kevin Jones rushed for 1,133 yards, becoming just the third Lion to rush for over 1,000 yards in their rookie season; the first was Billy Sims, who rushed for 1,303 yards in his 1980 rookie season, and the second was franchise legend Barry Sanders, who rushed for 1,470 yards in his 1989 rookie season.

== Offseason ==
=== Coaching changes ===
After a bottom tier defensive performance the season prior, the Lions fired defensive coordinator Kurt Schottenheimer and hired former Chicago Bears head coach Dick Jauron as their new defensive coordinator. Also from Chicago, the Lions brought in Larry Brooks as their defensive line coach.

=== Free agency ===
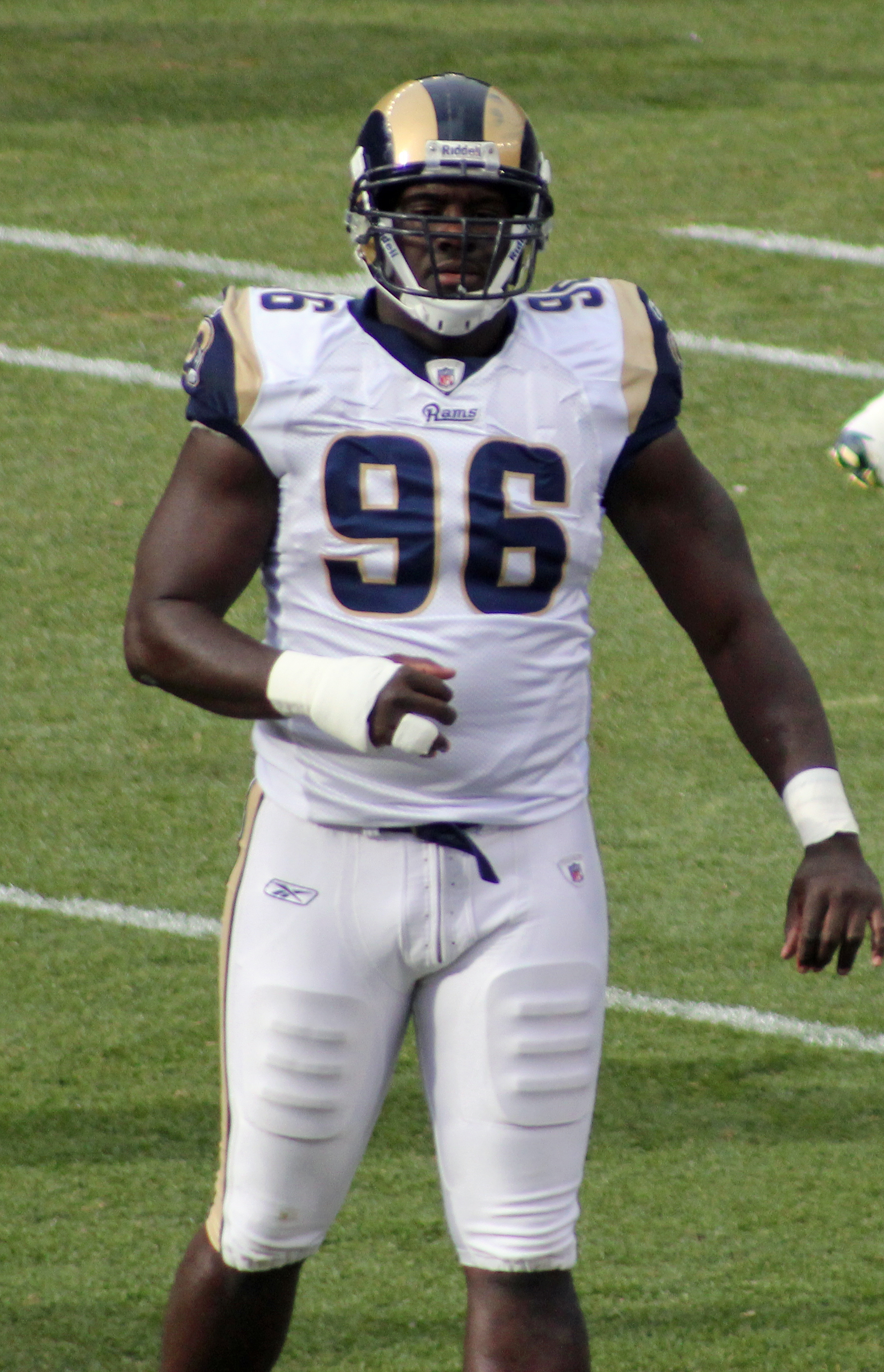
Detroit re-signed defensive end James Hall who went on to lead the team in sacks with 11.5.

Early in March, the Lions released running back James Stewart, former first round pick defensive tackle Luther Elliss, wide receiver Bill Schroeder, and veteran cornerback Corey Harris. Detroit released more players prior to the regular season, including tight end Mikhael Ricks, wide receiver David Kircus, running back Avon Cobourne, and fullback Stephen Trejo.

The Lions re-signed defensive end James Hall and restructured franchise all-time sack leader Robert Porcher's despite the latter contemplating retirement. They also resigned running back Shawn Bryson, guard David Loverne, quarterback Mike McMahon, wide receiver and return man Reggie Swinton, wide receiver Scotty Anderson, and linebacker Donté Curry. The Lions also re-signed kicker and franchise all-time leading scorer Jason Hanson to a four-year deal.

The Lions signed guard Damien Woody, cornerback Fernando Bryant, and quarterback Rick Mirer. Late into the season, the Lions also signed offensive tackle Sean Bubin from the Jacksonville Jaguars practice squad.

=== NFL Draft ===
Detroit drafted two players in the first round: wide receiver Roy Williams and running back Kevin Jones. Williams recorded 3,884 receiving yards and 29 receiving touchdowns before being traded to the Dallas Cowboys in 2008. Jones recorded 3,067 rushing yards and 24 rushing touchdowns in his four seasons with the Lions. Detroit's second round selection, Teddy Lehman, spent four seasons with the Lions and recorded 2 interceptions, 148 combined tackles, and a sack. Their third round selection, Keith Smith, spent five seasons with Detroit, recording 4 interceptions, 13 passes defended, and 159 combined tackles. Linebacker Alex Lewis, their fifth round pick, spent his entire five year career with the Lions, recording one interception, two sacks, and 177 combined tackles. Sixth round pick offensive tackle Kelly Butler played only 16 games, all in 2005.

2004 Detroit Lions draft
Round	Pick	Player	Position	College	Notes
1	7	Roy Williams *	WR	Texas	
1	30	Kevin Jones	RB	Virginia Tech	
2	37	Teddy Lehman	LB	Oklahoma	
3	73	Keith Smith	CB	McNeese State	
5	140	Alex Lewis	LB	Wisconsin	
6	172	Kelly Butler	OT	Purdue	
Made roster † Pro Football Hall of Fame * Made at least one Pro Bowl during career

== Personnel ==
=== Staff ===
2004 Detroit Lions staff
Front office: Owner and chairman – William Clay Ford Sr.; Vice chairman – William Clay Ford Jr.; President and chief executive officer – Matt Millen; Executive vice president and chief operating officer – Tom Lewand; Senior vice president of football administration/legal affairs – Martin Mayhew; Director of pro personnel – Sheldon White; Director of college scouting – Scott McEwen; Assistant director of pro personnel – Charlie Sanders; College scouting coordinator – Russ Bolinger; Head coaches: Head coach – Steve Mariucci; Assistant to the head coach – Kevin Lartigue; Offensive coaches: Offensive coordinator – Sherman Lewis; Quarterbacks – Greg Olson; Running backs – Tom Rathman; Wide receivers – Kevin Higgins; Tight ends – Andy Sugarman; Offensive line – Pat Morris; Assistant offensive line/tight ends – Sean Kugler	Defensive coaches: Defensive coordinator – Dick Jauron; Defensive line – Larry Brooks; Linebackers – Richard Smith; Defensive backs – George Catavolos; Defensive assistant – Johnny Holland; Defensive assistant – Don Clemons; Special teams coaches: Special teams coordinator – Chuck Priefer; Assistant special teams – Stan Kwan; Strength and conditioning: Strength and conditioning – Jason Arapoff; Strength and conditioning – Malcolm Blacken; Assistant strength and conditioning – Mondray Gee

=== Roster ===
2004 Detroit Lions roster
Quarterbacks (QB): 3 Joey Harrington; 8 Mike McMahon; 5 Rick Mirer; Running backs (RB): 24 Shawn Bryson; 34 Kevin Jones; 21 Artose Pinner; 30 Cory Schlesinger FB; 33 Stephen Trejo FB; Wide receivers (WR): 81 Az-Zahir Hakim; 87 David Kircus; 84 Tai Streets; 88 Reggie Swinton; 10 Scottie Vines; 11 Roy Williams; Tight ends (TE): 86 Stephen Alexander; 82 Casey FitzSimmons	Offensive linemen (OL): 76 Jeff Backus LT; 70 Sean Bubin RT; 79 Kelly Butler LT; 68 Tyrone Hopson C; 75 Matt Joyce G; 62 David Loverne G; 73 Stockar McDougle RT; 51 Dominic Raiola C; 71 Victor Rogers LT; 65 Damien Woody G; Defensive linemen (DL): 94 Marcus Bell DT; 95 Jared DeVries DE; 98 Kalimba Edwards DE; 96 James Hall DE; 93 Kelvin Pritchett DT; 78 Cory Redding DE; 92 Shaun Rogers DT; 72 Dan Wilkinson DT	Linebackers (LB): 55 Donté Curry MLB; 52 James Davis OLB; 50 Earl Holmes MLB; 54 Teddy Lehman OLB; 59 Alex Lewis OLB; 58 Wali Rainer OLB; Defensive backs (DB): 32 Dré Bly CB; 25 Fernando Bryant CB; 29 Chris Cash CB; 39 Mike Echols CB; 36 Vernon Fox SS; 35 André Goodman CB; 42 Terrence Holt FS; 31 Brock Marion FS; 38 Keith Smith CB; 28 Bracy Walker SS; Special teams (ST): 4 Jason Hanson K; 2 Nick Harris P; 67 Don Muhlbach LS	Practice squad: 53 Andrew Battle LB (IR); 23 Avon Cobourne RB; 41 Kentrell Curry S; 48 Scott Genord LB; 77 Matt McCoy T; 61 Andrew Shull DE; 49 Leonard Stephens TE; 16 Tim Van Zant WR; Reserve: 26 Rod Babers CB (IR); 97 Boss Bailey OLB (IR); 18 Eddie Drummond WR (IR); 57 Jody Littleton LS (IR); 80 Charles Rogers WR (IR); 47 Dainon Sidney CB (IR); 27 Paul Smith FB (IR); 45 Brian Walker FS (IR); Rookies in italics 53 active, 9 reserve, 7 practice squad

== Preseason ==
Detroit started their preseason by hosting the Pittsburgh Steelers. The Lions forced a fumble and scored on a Harrington pass to FitzSimmons to take an early 7–0 lead. The Steelers failed to get on the board when a Jeff Reed 54-yard field goal attempt came up short. After a Lions punt, the Steelers scored on a Ben Roethlisberger pass to Antwaan Randle El to tie the game. Detroit responded with a Hanson 46-yard field goal to go halftime up 10–7. They extended their lead early in the third with a Olandis Gary 1-yard touchdown. The Steelers responded with a 26-yard touchdown pass before Detroit extended their lead once again with a Chris Snyder 50-yard field goal and an Avon Cobourne 7-yard touchdown to go up 27–14. The Steelers responded with a 22-yard rushing touchdown, but would not be able to score again as the Lions won 27–21. For their second preseason game, the Lions traveled to face the Cleveland Browns. The Lions opened up the game with a Harrington 10-yard touchdown off the back of a Jeff Garcia fumble. The Browns responded with two Lee Suggs touchdown runs to go up 14–7 into halftime. The Lions looked to cut the deficit with a Chris Snyder 38-yard field goal, but he missed it wide right. But Snyder hit on a 21-yard field goal to bring the score to 14–10 heading into the fourth. A late Browns field goal and a turnover on downs solidified the 10–14 loss.

The Lions stayed in the AFC North, heading to the Baltimore Ravens for their third preseason game. Detroit opened up the scoring with a Hanson 43-yard field goal before Baltimore tied it with their own 41-yard field goal. Another Hanson field goal put the Lions up 6–3 going into halftime. The Ravens took the first play of the second half 84-yards for the score to take the 10–6 lead. Another Baltimore touchdown would hand the Lions a 6–17 loss. In their final game of the preseason, the Lions hosted the Buffalo Bills. Buffalo took up half the first quarter with a touchdown drive, which the Lions responded with a Hanson 39-yard field goal and their own long touchdown drive to go up 10–7. A Buffalo field goal responded to by a Lions field goal set the score at 13–10 heading to halftime. Buffalo took the lead on a 4-yard touchdown run. With 1:09 left in the game and set up with good field position by a 43-yard Swinton return, the Lions scored a game-winning 26-yard touchdown to win 20–17.

Week	Date	Opponent	Result	Record	Attendance	Recap
1	August 14	Pittsburgh Steelers	W 27–21	1–0	60,159	Recap
2	August 21	at Cleveland Browns	L 10–17	1–1	67,771	Recap
3	August 28	at Baltimore Ravens	L 6–17	1–2	69,552	Recap
4	September 2	Buffalo Bills	W 20–17	2–2	57,746	Recap

== Regular season ==
=== Overview ===
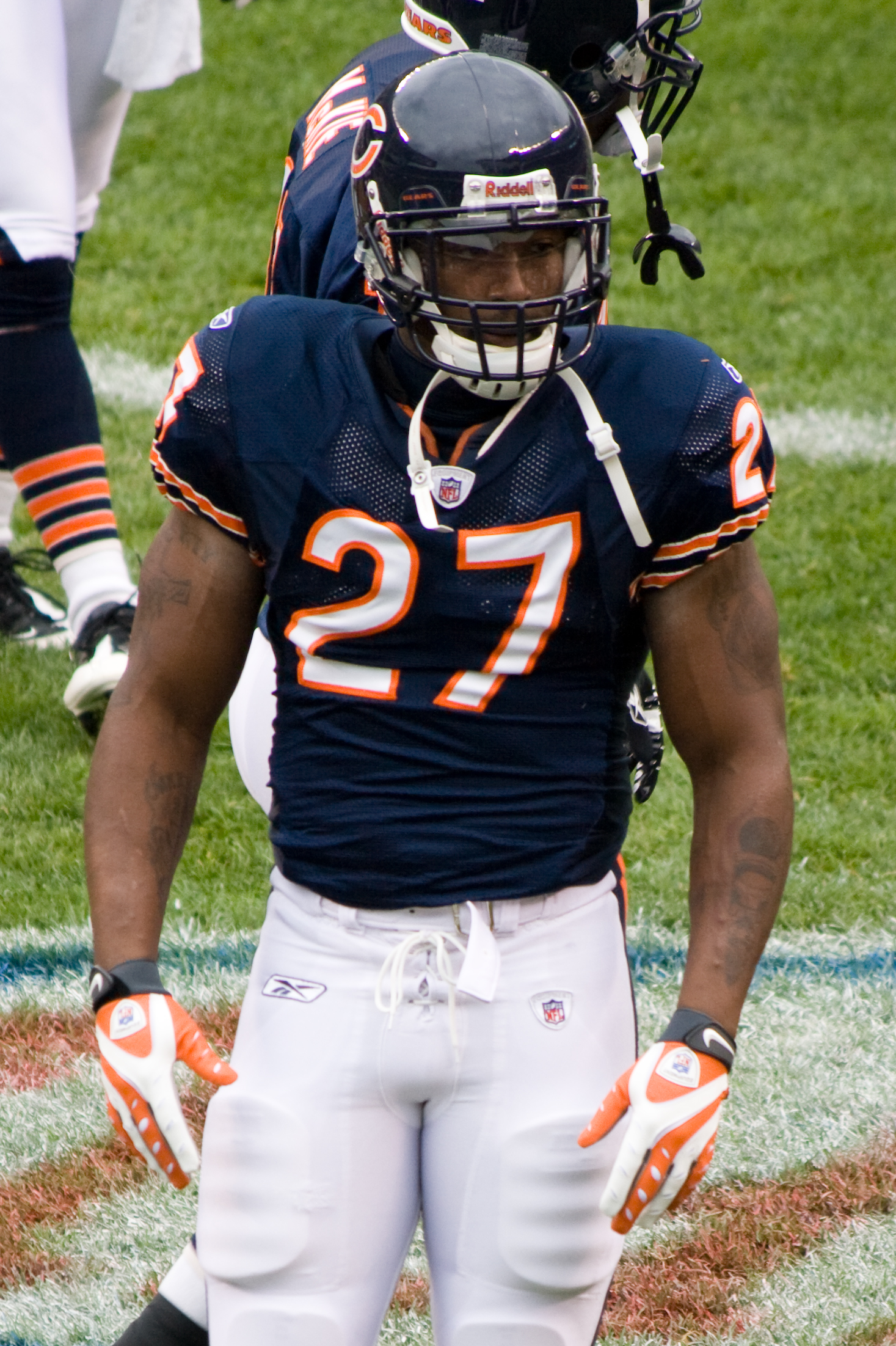
The second of two Lions first-round draft selections in 2004, Kevin Jones led the team in rushing yards with 1,133 and scored five rushing touchdowns.

The Lions started their season 4–2 before suffering a 5-game losing streak and ending their season 6–10, missing the playoffs. They suffered their fourth straight losing season and finished third in the NFC North. The offense, led by offensive coordinator Sherman Lewis, was 24th in both points and yards. The passing game, headed by three-year starter Joey Harrington, was 23rd in passing yards and 20th in passing touchdowns. Harrington passed for a career-high 3,047 yards, a career-high 19 touchdowns, and 12 interceptions. The run game was led by rookie Kevin Jones who finished with 1,133 rushing yards and five rushing touchdowns, becoming just the third Lion since Billy Sims and Barry Sanders to rush for over 1,000 yards in their rookie season. The run game finished 19th in rushing yards but 30th in rushing touchdowns. The defense, led by first-year defensive coordinator and former Chicago Bears head coach Dick Jauron, finished 18th in points allowed and 22nd in yards allowed. Cornerback Dré Bly lead the team in interceptions with four, including a pick-six, while defensive end James Hall led the team in sacks with 11½ and linebacker Earl Holmes led the team in combined tackles with 111. Kicker Jason Hanson went 24 for 28 on field goal attempts and 28 for 28 on extra point attempts, while punter Nick Harris averaged 40.9 yards per punt.

Detroit's second-round selection in 2003, linebacker Boss Bailey, missed the entirety of the 2004 season after an injury in practice revealed torn cartilage. Bailey went on the active roster towards the end of the season, but was placed back on injured reserve after Bailey said the injury was "holding me back mentally". Wide receiver Charles Rogers, whom the Lions selected second overall in 2003, broke his collarbone during the Lions' season opener against the Chicago Bears and was lost for the season. Cornerback Dré Bly injured his knee in the same game and would not return until Week 6. Detroit also lost running back Paul Smith for the season, placing him on injured reserve. In Week 3, rookie running back Kevin Jones suffered a high-ankle sprain which sidelined him for the Week 5 game against Atlanta and lost cornerback Rod Babers for the season with a broken collarbone. During the Thanksgiving Day matchup against the Colts, return specialist Eddie Drummond fractured his shoulder blade, keeping him out for the rest of the season. Robert Porcher, who had forgone retirement in the offseason to return to Detroit, chose to retire after not suiting up for a single Detroit game. Porcher retired with a franchise-leading 95½ sacks. (Note: Sacks before 1982 are considered unofficial by the National Football League. Alex Karras accrued 100.0 unofficial sacks in his career with Detroit.)

=== Schedule ===
In addition to their regular games with NFC North divisional rivals, the Lions played teams from the NFC East and AFC South, as well as against the Atlanta Falcons and the Arizona Cardinals, who had finished fourth in their respective divisions in 2003.

Week	Date	Opponent	Result	Record	Venue	Attendance
1	September 12	at **Chicago Bears**	**W** 20–16	1–0	Soldier Field	61,535
2	September 19	Houston Texans	**W** 28–16	2–0	Ford Field	61,465
3	September 26	Philadelphia Eagles	**L** 13–30	2–1	Ford Field	62,472
4	Bye					
5	October 10	at Atlanta Falcons	**W** 17–10	3–1	Georgia Dome	70,434
6	October 17	**Green Bay Packers**	**L** 10–38	3–2	Ford Field	62,938
7	October 24	at New York Giants	**W** 28–13	4–2	Giants Stadium	78,841
8	October 31	at Dallas Cowboys	**L** 21–31	4–3	Texas Stadium	63,616
9	November 7	Washington Redskins	**L** 10–17	4–4	Ford Field	62,657
10	November 14	at Jacksonville Jaguars	**L** 17–23 (OT)	4–5	Alltel Stadium	66,431
11	November 21	at **Minnesota Vikings**	**L** 19–22	4–6	Hubert H. Humphrey Metrodome	64,156
12	November 25	Indianapolis Colts	**L** 9–41	4–7	Ford Field	63,107
13	December 5	Arizona Cardinals	**W** 26–12	5–7	Ford Field	62,262
14	December 12	at **Green Bay Packers**	**L** 13–16	5–8	Lambeau Field	70,497
15	December 19	**Minnesota Vikings**	**L** 27–28	5–9	Ford Field	62,337
16	December 26	**Chicago Bears**	**W** 19–13	6–9	Ford Field	61,924
17	January 2	at Tennessee Titans	**L** 19–24	6–10	The Coliseum	68,809
Note: Intra-divisional opponents are in **bold** text.

=== Game summaries ===
All game reports use the Pro Football Researchers' gamebook archive as a source.

==== Week 1: at Chicago Bears ====
Week 1: Detroit Lions at Chicago Bears – Game summary

Quarter	1	2	3	4	Total
**Lions**	0	3	10	7	**20**
Bears	7	0	0	9	**16**

at Soldier Field, Chicago, Illinois

- Date: September 12, 2004
- Game time: 1:00 p.m. EDT
- Game weather: Sunny, 79 °F (26.1 °C)
- Game attendance: 61,535
- Referee: Larry Nemmers
- Box score

Game information

**First quarter**

- CHI – Thomas Jones 2-yard rush (Paul Edinger kick good), 7:38. Chicago 7–0 **Drive: 6 plays, 58 yards, 3:25.**

**Second quarter**

- DET – Jason Hanson 27-yard field goal, 0:16. Chicago 7–3 **Drive: 9 plays, 71 yards, 4:09.**

**Third quarter**

- DET – Bracy Walker 92-yard blocked field goal return (Jason Hanson kick good), 12:17. Detroit 10–7.
- DET – Jason Hanson 21-yard field goal, 7:37. Detroit 13–7 **Drive: 6 plays, 38 yards, 2:28.**

**Fourth quarter**

- CHI – Thomas Jones 2-yard rush (Paul Edinger kick good), 12:40. Chicago 14–13 **Drive: 11 plays, 64 yards, 5:28.**
- DET – Az-Zahir Hakim 4-yard pass from Joey Harrington (Jason Hanson kick good), 9:54. Detroit 20–14 **Drive: 5 plays, 49 yards, 2:46.**
- CHI – Nick Harris out of bounds in endzone, 1:53. Detroit 20–16.

**Top passers**

- DET – Joey Harrington – 14/26, 187 yards, TD, INT
- CHI – Rex Grossman – 16/35, 227 yards, 2 INT

**Top receivers**

- DET – Roy Williams – 4 receptions, 69 yards
- CHI – David Terrell – 5 receptions, 126 yards

**Top rushers**

- DET – Kevin Jones – 15 rushes, 36 yards
- CHI – Thomas Jones – 21 rushes, 67 yards, 2 TD

To begin their season, the Lions traveled to Soldier Field to face the Chicago Bears. The two teams punted on their opening drives before the Bears scored on a Thomas Jones 2-yard run. Following two punts, the Lions got a takeaway when a Rex Grossman deep-shot for Daryl Jones was intercepted by André Goodman. After four more punts, the Lions got on the board with a Jason Hanson 27-yard field goal to put the score at 7–3 Bears heading into halftime.

The Lions punted on the first drive of the second half before the Bears looked to extend their lead with a Paul Edinger 27-yard field goal. On the attempt, the ball was blocked by Shaun Rogers and recovered by Bracy Walker, who returned 92-yards for the touchdown. On the first play of Chicago's responding drive, Desmond Clark fumbled a reception from Grossman which was recovered by Donté Curry. Another turnover followed when Harrington was intercepted by Mike Green. A third turnover followed when James Hall strip-sacked Grossman which was recovered by Rogers. The Lions finally capitalized when Hanson scored from 21-yards out to bring their lead to 13–7. Both teams punted before a long Chicago drive was capped by another Jones 2-yard touchdown run to put the Bears ahead 14–13. The Lions quickly responded with a two-minute drive, scoring when Harrington found Az-Zahir Hakim for a 4-yard touchdown. After a Bears punt, the Lions burned nearly five minutes off the clock, giving the ball back to the Bears with four minutes left. The Bears went three-and-out, and punted, pinning the Lions at their own 8. The Lions, unable to move the ball, chose to take a safety instead of punting out of their own endzone. The Bears returned the ball 37 yards and moved it across mid-field. Grossman moved the Bears into the redzone and down to the Lions 12, but threw an interception to Walker, sealing the 20–16 win on the road for the Lions. This win snapped a 24-game road game losing streak, an NFL record.

==== Week 2: vs. Houston Texans ====
Week 2: Houston Texans at Detroit Lions – Game summary

Quarter	1	2	3	4	Total
Texans	0	3	7	7	**17**
**Lions**	0	7	14	6	**27**

at Ford Field, Detroit, Michigan

- Date: September 19, 2004
- Game time: 1:00 p.m. EDT/12:00 p.m. CDT
- Game weather: None (indoor stadium)
- Game attendance: 61,465
- Referee: Jeff Triplette
- Box score

Game information

**First quarter**

- No scoring plays

**Second quarter**

- DET – Cory Schlesinger 1-yard pass from Joey Harrington (Jason Hanson kick good), 6:56. Detroit 7–0 **Drive: 9 plays, 61 yards, 5:13.**
- HOU – Kris Brown 34-yard field goal, 1:06. Detroit 7–3 **Drive: 10 plays, 75 yards, 5:50.**

**Third quarter**

- DET – Roy Williams 31-yard pass from Joey Harrington (Jason Hanson kick good), 6:38. Detroit 14–3 **Drive: 7 plays, 79 yards, 4:04.**
- HOU – Andre Johnson 54-yard pass from David Carr (Kris Brown kick good), 2:31. Detroit 14–10 **Drive: 6 plays, 82 yards, 4:07.**
- DET – Eddie Drummond 99-yard kickoff return (Jason Hanson kick good), 2:16. Detroit 21–10.

**Fourth quarter**

- HOU – Corey Bradford 27-yard pass from David Carr (David Carr–Jabar Gaffney pass failed), 12:20. Detroit 21–16 **Drive: 11 plays, 81 yards, 4:56.**
- DET – Roy Williams 14-yard pass from Joey Harrington (Jason Hanson kick good), 4:41. Detroit 28–16 **Drive: 12 plays, 80 yards, 7:39.**

**Top passers**

- HOU – David Carr – 23/34, 313 yards, 2 TD, INT
- DET – Joey Harrington – 18/25, 176 yards, 3 TD, INT

**Top receivers**

- HOU – Domanick Williams – 11 receptions, 95 yards
- DET – Roy Williams – 4 receptions, 73 yards

**Top rushers**

- HOU – Domanick Williams – 25 rushes, 78 yards
- DET – Kevin Jones – 12 rushes, 57 yards

In their first home game of the season, the Lions hosted the Houston Texans. After starting the game with four straight punts, the Lions got good field position when running back Domanick Williams fumbled the ball away. Joey Harrington tossed an interception on the first play of that ensuing drive, but was saved by a roughing the passer penalty. But the Lions was scoreless into the second quarter after Jason Hanson missed a 47-yard field goal wide right. The Texans turned the ball over again on a David Carr pass that was intercepted by Keith Smith. The Lions got on the board with a Harrington 1-yard touchdown pass to Cory Schlesinger. The Texans responded with a Kris Brown 34-yard field goal to put the score at 7–3 heading into halftime.

Detroit ended the first drive of the second half with a Harrington interception to Aaron Glenn, but got the ball right back when Domanick Williams fumbled on a pass from Carr. The Lions took that turnover 79-yards and scored on a Harrington pass to Roy Williams to go up 14–3. The Texans responded with a Carr 54-yard touchdown pass to Andre Johnson. However, the Lions immediately responded when Eddie Drummond took the ensuing kickoff 99-yards for the score, putting the Lions ahead 21–10 heading into the fourth. The Texans looked to pull within three when Carr found Corey Bradford on the 27-yard touchdown pass, but the ensuing 2-point conversion failed, keeping the score at 21–16. The Lions extended their lead on a Harrington pass to Roy Williams to seal the 28–16 victory and rise to 2–0.

==== Week 3: vs. Philadelphia Eagles ====
Week 3: Philadelphia Eagles at Detroit Lions – Game summary

Quarter	1	2	3	4	Total
**Eagles**	14	7	6	3	**30**
Lions	0	7	0	6	**13**

at Ford Field, Detroit, Michigan

- Date: September 26, 2004
- Game time: 1:00 p.m. EDT
- Game weather: None (indoor stadium)
- Game attendance: 62,472
- Referee: Terry McAulay
- Box score

Game information

**First quarter**

- PHI – Donovan McNabb 1-yard rush (David Akers kick good), 2:08. Philadelphia 7–0 **Drive: 7 plays, 88 yards, 4:34.**
- PHI – Terrell Owens 29-yard pass from Donovan McNabb (David Akers kick good), 1:28. Philadelphia 14–0 **Drive: 1 play, 29 yards, 0:06.**

**Second quarter**

- PHI – Mike Bartrum 1-yard pass from Donovan McNabb (David Akers kick good), 5:59. Philadelphia 21–0 **Drive: 12 plays, 87 yards, 7:35.**
- DET – Roy Williams 12-yard pass from Joey Harrington (Jason Hanson kick good), 0:20. Philadelphia 21–7 **Drive: 7 plays, 64 yards, 1:07.**

**Third quarter**

- PHI – David Akers 26-yard field goal, 9:41. Philadelphia 24–7 **Drive: 10 plays, 65 yards, 5:19.**
- PHI – David Akers 47-yard field goal, 6:42. Philadelphia 27–7 **Drive: 4 plays, 7 yards, 1:13.**

**Fourth quarter**

- PHI – David Akers 39-yard field goal, 10:22. Philadelphia 30–7 **Drive: 8 plays, 58 yards, 4:06.**
- DET – Roy Williams 29-yard pass from Joey Harrington (Joey Harrington–Tai Streets pass failed), 8:34. Philadelphia 30–13 **Drive: 3 plays, 29 yards, 1:48.**

**Top passers**

- PHI – Donovan McNabb – 29/42, 356 yards, 2 TD
- DET – Joey Harrington – 21/38, 199 yards, 2 TD

**Top receivers**

- PHI – Terrell Owens – 6 receptions, 107 yards, TD
- DET – Roy Williams – 9 receptions, 135 yards, 2 TD

**Top rushers**

- PHI – Brian Westbrook – 13 rushes, 44 yards
- DET – Shawn Bryson – 5 rushes, 43 yards

In Week 3, the Lions hosted the eventual NFC champion Philadelphia Eagles. After three punts to start the game, the Eagles got on the board first with a Donovan McNabb 1-yard touchdown run. After Joey Harrington was strip-sacked, McNabb found Terrell Owens on a 29-yard pass to go up 14–0. After a Lions punt, McNabb found his third touchdown with a 1-yard pass to Mike Bartrum. After two punts, the Lions scored with a Harrington pass to Roy Williams to put the halftime score at 21–7.

The Eagles extended their lead with a David Akers 26-yard field goal and, after a Lions punt, a 47-yard field goal. After a turnover on downs, the Lions got the ball back on a fumble recovery. However, they went three-and-out, and the Eagles got a 39-yard field goal to go up 30–7. The Lions scored on a Harrington pass to Roy Williams to pull within 17. After another turnover on downs, the Lions sealed their 30–13 loss.

==== Week 5: at Atlanta Falcons ====
Week 5: Detroit Lions at Atlanta Falcons – Game summary

Quarter	1	2	3	4	Total
**Lions**	0	14	3	0	**17**
Falcons	0	7	0	3	**10**

at Georgia Dome, Atlanta, Georgia

- Date: October 10, 2004
- Game time: 1:00 p.m. EDT
- Game weather: None (indoor stadium)
- Game attendance: 70,434
- Referee: Ron Winter
- Box score

Game information

**First quarter**

- No scoring plays

**Second quarter**

- ATL – Warrick Dunn 2-yard rush (Jay Feely kick good), 6:26. Atlanta 7–0 **Drive: 12 plays, 68 yards, 5:21.**
- DET – Az-Zahir Hakim 39-yard pass from Joey Harrington (Jason Hanson kick good), 3:20. Tied 7–7 **Drive: 6 plays, 76 yards, 3:06.**
- DET – Artose Pinner 1-yard rush (Jason Hanson kick good), 1:57. Detroit 14–7 **Drive: 3 plays, 2 yards, 1:10.**

**Third quarter**

- DET – Jason Hanson 23-yard field goal, 0:23. Detroit 17–7 **Drive: 7 plays, 12 yards, 3:01.**

**Fourth quarter**

- ATL – Jay Feely 27-yard field goal, 11:23. Detroit 17–10 **Drive: 10 plays, 53 yards, 4:00.**

**Top passers**

- DET – Joey Harrington – 16/24, 146 yards, TD
- ATL – Michael Vick – 18/29, 196 yards, INT

**Top receivers**

- DET – Az-Zahir Hakim – 3 receptions, 64 yards, TD
- ATL – Peerless Price – 5 receptions, 84 yards

**Top rushers**

- DET – Artose Pinner – 23 rushes, 68 yards, TD
- ATL – Warrick Dunn – 18 rushes, 44 yards, TD

Following their early bye week, the Lions traveled to the Georgia Dome to play the Atlanta Falcons. After six straight punts brought the game into the second quarter, the Falcons opened up the scoring after converting two fourth downs, including a fake punt, with a Warrick Dunn 2-yard rushing touchdown. The Lions responded when, on fourth-and-five, Joey Harrington found Az-Zahir Hakim on a 39-yard touchdown pass to tie the game at 7 apiece. On the first play of the Falcons' responding drive, Michael Vick threw an interception to linebacker Alex Lewis who returned it 33 yards to Atlanta's 2-yard line. Detroit punched it in for 6 on an Artose Pinner 1-yard run to go up 14–7 heading into halftime.

The Lions punted on the first drive of the second half before getting the ball right back when Vick was strip-sacked by James Hall. The Lions failed to capitalize when Jason Hanson missed a 48-yard field goal. After a Falcons punt, the Lions looked to give the ball right back on a punt. However, return man Allen Rossum muffed the catch, turning it over to Detroit. The Lions cashed in on the turnover with a Hanson 23-yard field goal. The Falcons responded with a Jay Feely 27-yard field goal to pull within a touchdown at 17–10. The Lions punted on a three-and-out before forcing the Falcons to punt with 5:47 left in the game. Detroit drained the rest of the clock out to seal the 17–10 victory and first place in the NFC North.

==== Week 6: vs. Green Bay Packers ====
Week 6: Green Bay Packers at Detroit Lions – Game summary

Quarter	1	2	3	4	Total
**Packers**	7	10	14	7	**38**
Lions	7	3	0	0	**10**

at Ford Field, Detroit, Michigan

- Date: October 17, 2004
- Game time: 1:00 p.m. EDT/12:00 p.m. CDT
- Game weather: None (indoor stadium)
- Game attendance: 62,938
- Referee: Bill Leavy
- Box score

Game information

**First quarter**

- GB – Donald Driver 7-yard pass from Brett Favre (Ryan Longwell kick good), 6:48. Green Bay 7–0 **Drive: 11 plays, 75 yards, 6:13.**
- DET – Az-Zahir Hakim 28-yard pass from Joey Harrington (Jason Hanson kick good), 3:47. Tied 7–7 **Drive: 6 plays, 67 yards, 3:01.**

**Second quarter**

- GB – Tony Fisher 13-yard pass from Brett Favre (Ryan Longwell kick good), 9:10. Green Bay 14–7 **Drive: 6 plays, 74 yards, 2:52.**
- DET – Jason Hanson 48-yard field goal, 4:41. Green Bay 14–10 **Drive: 5 plays, 17 yards, 2:21.**
- GB – Ryan Longwell 50-yard field goal, 0:00. Green Bay 17–10 **Drive: 8 plays, 50 yards, 1:47.**

**Third quarter**

- GB – Darren Sharper 36-yard interception return (Ryan Longwell kick good), 10:52. Green Bay 24–10.
- GB – Najeh Davenport 13-yard rush (Ryan Longwell kick good), 3:28. Green Bay 31–10 **Drive: 11 plays, 63 yards, 6:18.**

**Fourth quarter**

- GB – Donald Driver 20-yard pass from Ahman Green (Ryan Longwell kick good), 10:01. Green Bay 38–10 **Drive: 11 plays, 77 yards, 6:13.**

**Top passers**

- GB – Brett Favre – 25/38, 257 yards, 2 TD
- DET – Joey Harrington – 12/23, 101 yards, TD, INT

**Top receivers**

- GB – Donald Driver – 9 receptions, 110 yards, 2 TD
- DET – Az-Zahir Hakim – 4 receptions, 49 yards, TD

**Top rushers**

- GB – Ahman Green – 21 rushes, 81 yards
- DET – Joey Harrington – 4 rushes, 12 yards

In Week 6, the Lions hosted the Green Bay Packers. The Lions went three-and-out on their first possession before the Packers drove 75 yards to score on a Donald Driver 7-yard pass from Brett Favre. The Lions responded with a scoring drive of their own, scoring when Joey Harrington found Az-Zahir Hakim for the 28-yard touchdown pass to tie it at 7 going into the second quarter. After the two teams exchanged two punts each, the Packers took the lead on a Favre 13-yard touchdown pass to Tony Fisher. After two punts, the Lions closed the lead with a Jason Hanson 48-yard field goal. After the next two drives ended in punts, the Packers responded with a Ryan Longwell 50-yard boot as time expired to put the score at 17–10 heading into halftime.

The Packers punted on the opening drive of the half before an errant Harrington pass was intercepted by Darren Sharper and returned 36 yards for the touchdown. The Lions proceeded to turn it over on downs despite an Eddie Drummond 58-yard kickoff return. On the following drive, the Packers marched down the field before a 13-yard touchdown run from Najeh Davenport put the Packers up 31–10. The Lions punted before the Packers extended their lead with a 20-yard touchdown pass from running back Ahman Green to seal the 38–10 loss for the Lions.

==== Week 7: at New York Giants ====
Week 7: Detroit Lions at New York Giants – Game summary

Quarter	1	2	3	4	Total
**Lions**	7	0	7	14	**28**
Giants	7	3	0	3	**13**

at Giants Stadium, East Rutherford, New Jersey

- Date: October 24, 2004
- Game time: 1:00 p.m. EDT
- Game weather: Cloudy, 52 °F (11.1 °C)
- Game attendance: 78,841
- Referee: Walt Coleman
- Box score

Game information

**First quarter**

- DET – Roy Williams 18-yard pass from Joey Harrington (Jason Hanson kick good), 9:25. Detroit 7–0 **Drive: 10 plays, 70 yards, 5:35.**
- NYG – Tiki Barber 62-yard pass from Kurt Warner (Steve Christie kick good), 0:16. Tied 7–7 **Drive: 5 plays, 91 yards, 2:22.**

**Second quarter**

- NYG – Steve Christie 19-yard field goal, 7:07. New York 10–7 **Drive: 12 plays, 64 yards, 6:22.**

**Third quarter**

- DET – Kevin Jones 2-yard rush (Jason Hanson kick good), 9:34. Detroit 14–10 **Drive: 5 plays, 68 yards, 2:51.**

**Fourth quarter**

- NYG – Steve Christie 25-yard field goal, 8:18. Detroit 14–13 **Drive: 14 plays, 76 yards, 7:50.**
- DET – Reggie Swinton 2-yard pass from Joey Harrington (Jason Hanson kick good), 2:52. Detroit 21–13 **Drive: 9 plays, 70 yards, 5:26.**
- DET – Artose Pinner 8-yard rush (Jason Hanson kick good), 1:46. Detroit 28–13 **Drive: 4 plays, 21 yards, 0:25.**

**Top passers**

- DET – Joey Harrington – 18/22, 230 yards, 2 TD
- NYG – Kurt Warner – 23/34, 270 yards, TD, INT

**Top receivers**

- DET – Roy Williams – 4 receptions, 67 yards, TD
- NYG – Tiki Barber – 7 receptions, 102 yards, TD

**Top rushers**

- DET – Kevin Jones – 13 rushes, 65 yards, TD
- NYG – Tiki Barber – 22 rushes, 70 yards

In Week 7, the Lions traveled to face the New York Giants. The Lions got off to a hot start when they took the first drive of the game 70 yards, capped by a Joey Harrington 18-yard touchdown pass to Roy Williams. The Giants looked to respond before Kurt Warner was strip-sacked by James Hall, but the Lions could not capitalize and punted. The Giants got on the board with a big 62-yard touchdown pass from Warner to Tiki Barber to tie the game. The Lions moved into Giant territory with a 37-yard pass from Harrington to Williams, but after a sack, an offensive holding penalty, and another sack, they were forced to punt. The Giants took the lead with a Steve Christie 19-yard field goal on the following drive. After another Lions punt, the Giants looked poised to score points when they moved down to Detroit's 11, but a Warner pass was intercepted by Chris Cash to keep the score at 10–7 heading into halftime.

The Giants punted on the first drive of the second half before the Lions cashed in a touchdown from Kevin Jones to take the lead 14–10. After two punts, the Giants lurched downfield on a 14-play drive to score on a Christie 25-yard field goal to pull within 1. The Lions stretched their lead with a Harrington 2-yard touchdown pass to Reggie Swinton to go up 21–13. After Warner threw three straight incompletions to turn the ball over on downs with 2:11 left in the game, Artose Pinner scored the dagger 8-yard touchdown run to seal the 28–13 victory for Detroit and a 4–2 record.

==== Week 8: at Dallas Cowboys ====
Week 8: Detroit Lions at Dallas Cowboys – Game summary

Quarter	1	2	3	4	Total
Lions	7	7	0	7	**21**
**Cowboys**	7	7	7	10	**31**

at Texas Stadium, Irving, Texas

- Date: October 31, 2004
- Game time: 1:00 p.m. EST/12:00 p.m. CST
- Game weather: Cloudy, 78 °F (25.6 °C)
- Game attendance: 63,616
- Referee: Peter Morelli
- Box score

Game information

**First quarter**

- DET – Kevin Jones 1-yard pass from Joey Harrington (Jason Hanson kick good), 11:02. Detroit 7–0 **Drive: 7 plays, 74 yards, 3:58.**
- DAL – Jason Witten 17-yard pass from Vinny Testaverde (Billy Cundiff kick good), 1:07. Tied 7–7 **Drive: 15 plays, 83 yards, 9:55.**

**Second quarter**

- DET – Dré Bly 55-yard interception return (Jason Hanson kick good), 8:18. Detroit 14–7.
- DAL – Keyshawn Johnson 26-yard pass from Vinny Testaverde (Billy Cundiff kick good), 1:54. Tied 14–14 **Drive: 11 plays, 80 yards, 6:24.**

**Third quarter**

- DAL – Vinny Testaverde 3-yard rush (Billy Cundiff kick good), 14:37. Dallas 21–14 **Drive: 1 play, 46 yards, 0:23.**

**Fourth quarter**

- DAL – Billy Cundiff 40-yard field goal, 6:59. Dallas 24–14 **Drive: 9 plays, 31 yards, 4:42.**
- DET – David Kircus 50-yard pass from Joey Harrington (Jason Hanson kick good), 5:29. Dallas 24–21 **Drive: 3 plays, 78 yards, 1:30.**
- DAL – Keyshawn Johnson 38-yard pass from Vinny Testaverde (Billy Cundiff kick good), 1:54. Dallas 31–21 **Drive: 6 plays, 72 yards, 3:35.**

**Top passers**

- DET – Joey Harrington – 19/32, 255 yards, 2 TD, INT
- DAL – Vinny Testaverde – 19/24, 235 yards, 3 TD, 3 INT

**Top receivers**

- DET – Az-Zahir Hakim – 4 receptions, 90 yards
- DAL – Jason Witten – 9 receptions, 84 yards, TD

**Top rushers**

- DET – Kevin Jones – 11 rushes, 36 yards
- DAL – Eddie George – 31 rushes, 99 yards

In Week 8, the Lions headed to Texas Stadium to face the Dallas Cowboys. The Lions opened the scoring early on a Joey Harrington 1-yard touchdown pass to Kevin Jones. Dallas responded with a long 15 play, 83-yard drive before Vinny Testaverde found Jason Witten for the 17-yard touchdown pass to tie it at 7 apiece. After three punts, the Cowboys moved to mid-field before Testaverde threw an interception to Dré Bly who returned it down the sideline for the 55-yard pick-six. The Cowboys kept up, scoring on a Testaverde 26-yard pass to Keyshawn Johnson. Dallas looked to score again when Lance Frazier returned a Lions punt 55-yards to Detroit's 28-yard line. However, Testaverde threw an interception at Detroit's 5-yard line, keeping it tied at 14–14 heading into halftime.

On the first play of the second half, a flea flicker by Testaverde fell short, but a 43-yard defensive pass interference penalty from cornerback Chris Cash put the Cowboys at the Lions' 3-yard line. It took one play to score when Testaverde ran it in from 3 yards out to go up 21–14. The Lions took their responding drive into Dallas territory, but came up short and were forced to punt. A Dallas drive heading into Detroit territory was stopped short when Bly ran in front of Testaverde's endzone shot, intercepting it and bringing it back 30 yards to Detroit's 28. Despite bringing it to Dallas' 34, the Lions punted. After forcing Dallas to punt, the Lions again entered Dallas territory, but a Harrington sack on fourth-and-one turned the ball back over to the Cowboys. The Cowboys extended their lead with a Billy Cundiff 40-yard field goal. The Lions quickly responded when Harrington found David Kircus on a curl route for the 50-yard touchdown pass to pull within a field goal. However, a long Testaverde pass found Johnson for the 38-yard touchdown pass. Harrington would throw an interception on the first play of the next drive to seal their 31–21 loss.

==== Week 9: vs. Washington Redskins ====
Week 9: Washington Redskins at Detroit Lions – Game summary

Quarter	1	2	3	4	Total
**Redskins**	0	3	14	0	**17**
Lions	0	3	0	7	**10**

at Ford Field, Detroit, Michigan

- Date: November 7, 2004
- Game time: 1:00 p.m. EST
- Game weather: None (indoor stadium)
- Game attendance: 62,657
- Referee: Mike Carey
- TV announcers (FOX): Sam Rosen, Bill Maas, Chris Myers
- Box score

Game information

**First quarter**

- No scoring plays

**Second quarter**

- WAS – Ola Kimrin 24-yard field goal, 4:35. Washington 3–0 **Drive: 10 plays, 36 yards, 6:10.**
- DET – Jason Hanson 40-yard field goal, 0:03. Tied 3–3 **Drive: 7 plays, 75 yards, 0:40.**

**Third quarter**

- WAS – Laveranues Coles 15-yard pass from Clinton Portis (Ola Kimrin kick good), 10:25. Washington 10–3 **Drive: 7 plays, 71 yards, 4:35.**
- WAS – Walt Harris 13-yard blocked punt return (Ola Kimrin kick good), 4:32. Washington 17–3.

**Fourth quarter**

- DET – Cory Schlesinger 1-yard pass from Joey Harrington (Jason Hanson kick good), 2:08. Washington 17–10 **Drive: 8 plays, 66 yards, 2:19.**

**Top passers**

- WAS – Mark Brunell – 6/17, 58 yards
- DET – Joey Harrington – 26/52, 269 yards, TD, INT

**Top receivers**

- WAS – Laveranues Coles – 4 receptions, 46 yards, TD
- DET – Az-Zahir Hakim – 7 receptions, 120 yards

**Top rushers**

- WAS – Clinton Portis – 34 rushes, 147 yards
- DET – Shawn Bryson – 6 rushes, 21 yards

In Week 9, the Lions hosted the Washington Redskins. Each team punted on each possession in the first quarter before a 43-yard punt return by James Thrash set the Redskins up in Detroit territory. Washington capitalized, kicking an Ola Kimrin 24-yard field goal to open the scoring. After four more punts, the Lions moved from their own 3-yard line with Harrington passes of 14, 16, and 14 yards to kick a 40-yard field goal as time expired in the first half.

The Redskins marched downfield with the help of two back-to-back 21-yard Clinton Portis rushes before Portis threw a touchdown pass to Laveranues Coles to go up 10–3. Both teams punted on their next two plays, before the Lions looked to punt it away again after being stopped on 3rd and 2. However, the punt by Nick Harris was blocked by Taylor Jacobs, recovered by Walt Harris and brought back 13 yards for the touchdown. The Lions punted on their next drive before a Kimrin 51-yard field goal attempt came up short. After two more punts, the Lions looked poised to put points on the board when they moved into Washington territory. Getting down to Washingtons' 18, the Lions got backed up due to an offensive holding call. On 4th and 18 from Washingtons' 28, Harrington threw an interception to Fred Smoot, turning the ball over with 6:25 to play. After Washington failed to capitalize, the Lions moved within one score after a Harrington pass to Az-Zahir Hakim went for 33 yards which helped them score on a 1-yard touchdown pass to Cory Schlesinger. Washington could not seal the deal and punted with 1:36 left. Pinned inside their own 2-yard line, the Lions converted a 4th and 4 and moved down to their 43-yard line with 0:06 left. However, the last play fell short, sealing the 10–17 loss as the Lions fell to 4–4.

==== Week 10: at Jacksonville Jaguars ====
Week 10: Detroit Lions at Jacksonville Jaguars – Game summary

Quarter	1	2	3	4	OT	Total
Lions	0	0	0	17	0	**17**
**Jaguars**	7	3	7	0	6	**23**

at Attel Stadium, Jacksonville, Florida

- Date: November 14, 2004
- Game time: 1:00 p.m. EST
- Game weather: Gusts of 22 mph, 60 °F (15.6 °C)
- Game attendance: 66,431
- Referee: Scott Green
- TV announcers (FOX): Curt Menefee, Tim Green, Kim Coyle
- Box score

Game information

**First quarter**

- JAX – LaBrandon Toefield 12-yard pass from David Garrard (Josh Scobee kick good), 8:18. Jacksonville 7–0 **Drive: 7 plays, 72 yards, 4:00.**

**Second quarter**

- JAX – Josh Scobee 31-yard field goal, 0:00. Jacksonville 10–0 **Drive: 14 plays, 65 yards, 3:40.**

**Third quarter**

- JAX – Greg Jones 1-yard rush (Josh Scobee kick good), 5:49. Jacksonville 17–0 **Drive: 15 plays, 80 yards, 9:11.**

**Fourth quarter**

- DET – Eddie Drummond 55-yard punt return (Jason Hanson kick good), 13:07. Jacksonville 17–7.
- DET – Jason Hanson 21-yard field goal, 6:30. Jacksonville 17–10 **Drive: 6 plays, 64 yards, 2:16.**
- DET – Eddie Drummond 83-yard punt return (Jason Hanson kick good), 0:46. Tied 17–17.

**Overtime**

- JAX – Jimmy Smith 36-yard pass from David Garrard, 9:32. Jacksonville 23–17 **Drive: 11 plays, 76 yards, 5:28.**

**Top passers**

- DET – Joey Harrington – 11/33, 121 yards, INT
- JAX – David Garrard – 19/36, 198 yards, 2 TD

**Top receivers**

- DET – Roy Williams – 2 receptions, 64 yards
- JAX – Jimmy Smith – 7 receptions, 109 yards, TD

**Top rushers**

- DET – Kevin Jones – 19 rushes, 81 yards
- JAX – Fred Taylor – 23 rushes, 144 yards

In Week 10, the Lions traveled to Alltel Stadium to face the Jacksonville Jaguars. After the Lions punted on the first drive of the game, the Jaguars, with help from a Fred Taylor 42-yard punt return, got on the board with a LaBrandon Toefield 12-yard pass from David Garrard. After six punts led the game into the second quarter, Lions' quarterback Joey Harrington threw an interception to Rashean Mathis. The Jaguars would proceed to turn it over on downs. The Lions looked to score points when they headed into Jacksonville territory, getting down to their 14-yard line. The Lions lined up for a 32-yard field goal on fourth down, but kicker Jason Hanson missed it wide left, keeping the Lions scoreless. The Jaguars headed deep into Lions territory, but a defensive stop on 2nd and goal from the 1 led the Jaguars to kick a 31-yard field goal, which Josh Scobee made to put the Jaguars up 10–0 headed into halftime.

The Jaguars took the opening drive of the second half 80 yards over 15 plays to score on a Greg Jones 1-yard rush. After three punts, the Lions looked to get the ball back after a defensive stop on 3rd and 1. On the punt return, Eddie Drummond took it 55-yards for the touchdown, putting the Lions on the board. After a turnover on downs in Detroit territory, Detroit – following a big 46-yard Roy Williams reception – made it a 1-touchdown game after a Hanson 21-yard field goal. After three punts, the Lions failed to capitalize on a drive starting at Jacksonville's 38, turning it over on downs. With 1:22 left in the game, the Jaguars could not get a game-sealing first down. On the punt, Eddie Drummond caught it at his own 17-yard line, returning it 83-yards for the game-tying punt return touchdown, forcing overtime tied 17–17.

Jacksonville won the overtime coin toss and took the ball starting at their own 24-yard line. The Jaguars converted two third downs, moving into Detroit territory with chunk plays. On 3rd and 8 from Detroit's 36, Garrard found receiver Jimmy Smith who ran it 36 yards for the game-winning touchdown, pushing the Lions below .500 at 4–5.

==== Week 11: at Minnesota Vikings ====
Week 11: Detroit Lions at Minnesota Vikings – Game summary

Quarter	1	2	3	4	Total
Lions	14	3	2	0	**19**
**Vikings**	7	0	0	15	**22**

at Hubert H. Humphrey Metrodome, Minneapolis, Minnesota

- Date: November 21, 2004
- Game time: 1:00 p.m. EST/12:00 p.m. CST
- Game weather: None (indoor stadium)
- Game attendance: 64,156
- Referee: Ed Hochuli
- TV announcers (FOX): Sam Rosen, Bill Maas, Chris Myers
- Box score

Game information

**First quarter**

- DET – Eddie Drummond 92-yard kickoff return (Jason Hanson kick good), 14:48. Detroit 7–0.
- MIN – Jermaine Wiggins 8-yard pass from Daunte Culpepper (Morten Andersen kick good), 13:18. Tied 7–7 **Drive: 3 plays, 80 yards, 1:30.**
- DET – Stephen Alexander 1-yard pass from Joey Harrington (Jason Hanson kick good), 5:53. Detroit 14–7 **Drive: 14 plays, 60 yards, 7:25.**

**Second quarter**

- DET – Jason Hanson 48-yard field goal, 3:33. Detroit 17–7 **Drive: 12 plays, 62 yards, 6:27.**

**Third quarter**

- DET – Onterrio Smith tackled in end zone by Cory Redding for a safety, 9:29. Detroit 19–7.

**Fourth quarter**

- MIN – Nate Burleson 6-yard pass from Daunte Culpepper (Nate Burleson pass from Daunte Culpepper), 14:17. Detroit 19–15 **Drive: 17 plays, 78 yards, 8:11.**
- MIN – Moe Williams 1-yard rush (Morten Andersen kick good), 5:27. Minnesota 22–19.

**Top passers**

- DET – Joey Harrington – 12/19, 91 yards, TD, INT
- MIN – Daunte Culpepper – 22/32, 233 yards, 2 TD, INT

**Top receivers**

- DET – Stephen Alexander – 4 receptions, 27 yards, TD
- MIN – Kelly Campbell – 1 reception, 61 yards

**Top rushers**

- DET – Kevin Jones – 19 rushes, 100 yards
- MIN – Daunte Culpepper – 11 rushes, 35 yards

In Week 11, Detroit traveled to the Metrodome to face the Minnesota Vikings. Electing to receive the opening kickoff, the Lions instantly scored when Eddie Drummond returned the kick 92-yards for the score. The Vikings instantly responded when a Daunte Culpepper 61-yard pass to Kelly Campbell helped the Vikings score on another Culpepper pass, this time to Jermaine Wiggins, to even the score at 7 apiece. The Lions took the lead when, on the responding drive, they drove 60 yards to score on a Joey Harrington 1-yard touchdown pass to Stephen Alexander. Both teams punted on their next drives before the Vikings moved deep into Detroit territory. On 4th and 1 from Detroit's 8, a Culpepper pass fell incomplete to turn the ball over on downs. The Lions drove 62 yards to kick a Jason Hanson 48-yard field goal. Culpepper threw an interception before time expired to end the first half with the Lions ahead 17–7.

After a Minnesota punt, Detroit punter Nick Harris booted a punt that pinned Minnesota inside the 2-yard line. This paid off when a run by Onterrio Smith was stuffed by Cory Redding, resulting in a safety to give the Lions a 19–7 lead. The Lions punted after getting the ball, and the Vikings took 8:11 off the clock with a 17 play, 78 yard drive ending with a Culpepper pass to Nate Burleson. The two-point conversion to put the Vikings within 2 failed, putting the score at 19–15. The Lions failed to gain any traction as they punted again. The Vikings took the lead when Moe Williams punched it in for 6, giving them a 22–19 advantage. On their responding drive, the Lions punted, which was followed by a Vikings punt inside the two-minute warning. With 1:49 left in the game, Harrington threw an interception on the first play of their final drive, falling 22–19.

==== Week 12: vs. Indianapolis Colts ====
Week 12: Indianapolis Colts at Detroit Lions – Game summary

Quarter	1	2	3	4	Total
**Colts**	13	14	14	0	**41**
Lions	6	3	0	0	**9**

at Ford Field, Detroit, Michigan

- Date: November 24, 2004
- Game time: 12:30 p.m. EST/11:30 a.m. CST
- Game weather: None (indoor stadium)
- Game attendance: 63,107
- Referee: Tom White
- TV announcers (CBS): Jim Nantz, Phil Simms, Bonnie Bernstein
- Box score

Game information

**First quarter**

- IND – Brandon Stokley 4-yard pass from Peyton Manning (Mike Vanderjagt kick good), 10:16. Indianapolis 7–0 **Drive: 9 plays, 79 yards, 4:44.**
- DET – Jason Hanson 20-yard field goal, 7:16. Indianapolis 7–3 **Drive: 8 plays, 58 yards, 3:00.**
- IND – Brandon Stokley 12-yard pass from Peyton Manning (Mike Vanderjagt kick blocked by Shaun Rogers), 4:20. Indianapolis 13–3 **Drive: 7 plays, 60 yards, 2:56.**
- DET – Jason Hanson 34-yard kick good, 0:49. Indianapolis 13–6 **Drive: 8 plays, 55 yards, 3:31.**

**Second quarter**

- IND – Brandon Stokley 25-yard pass from Peyton Manning (Mike Vanderjagt kick good), 2:20. Indianapolis 20–6 **Drive: 5 plays, 47 yards, 1:59.**
- IND – Marvin Harrison 13-yard pass from Peyton Manning (Mike Vanderjagt kick good), 0:50. Indianapolis 27–6 **Drive: 3 plays, 31 yards, 1:01.**
- DET – Jason Hanson 32-yard field goal, 0:00. Indianapolis 27–9 **Drive: 6 plays, 66 yards, 0:50.**

**Third quarter**

- IND – Marvin Harrison 10-yard pass from Peyton Manning (Mike Vanderjagt kick good), 9:18. Indianapolis 34–9 **Drive: 8 plays, 64 yards, 4:23.**
- IND – Marvin Harrison 5-yard pass from Peyton Manning (Mike Vanderjagt kick good), 2:11. Indianapolis 41–9 **Drive: 6 plays, 36 yards, 3:16.**

**Fourth quarter**

- No scoring plays

**Top passers**

- IND – Peyton Manning – 23/28, 236 yards, 6 TD
- DET – Joey Harrington – 14/23, 156 yards

**Top receivers**

- IND – Marvin Harrison – 12 receptions, 127 yards, 3 TD
- DET – Stephen Alexander – 5 receptions, 58 yards

**Top rushers**

- IND – Edgerrin James – 23 rushes, 105 yards
- DET – Kevin Jones – 12 rushes, 99 yards

In Week 12, the Lions hosted the Indianapolis Colts on Thanksgiving Day. The Colts scored on their opening drive with a Peyton Manning pass to Brandon Stokley to go up 7–0. The Lions responded with a 3 minute drive ending in a Hanson 20-yard field goal to put themselves on the board down 7–3. The Colts responded again with a touchdown drive on another Manning–Stokley pass which, after defensive tackle Shaun Rogers blocked the extra point, put the Colts up 13–3. After a Kevin Jones 40-yard rush, the Lions kicked a 34-yard field goal to pull within 7 at 13–6 at the end of the first quarter. After forcing the Colts to punt, the Lions drove downfield and looked to kick another field goal. However, a rare Hanson miss from 48 turned the ball over with no score. After forcing the Colts to punt again, the Lions reached Indianapolis territory before Harrington fumbled on a sack by Rob Morris, turning the ball over. The Colts would score another touchdown on the third Manning–Stokley pass, putting them up 20–6. On the second play of the Lions' ensuing drive, Shawn Bryson caught a pass from Harrington but fumbled, putting the Colts at Detroit's 31. Manning would throw his fourth touchdown pass of the day with a pass to Marvin Harrison. The Lions managed to kick a field goal as time expired in the second half to set the score at 27–9 heading into halftime.

The Lions were held to a three-and-out to open the second half before Manning threw his fifth touchdown pass with a second touchdown pass to Marvin Harrison. After the Lions punted, their defense held the Colts to punt. On the punt return, Reggie Swinton fumbled, turning it back over to the Colts. The Colts scored on Manning's sixth touchdown pass, and his third to Marvin Harrison. The Lions benched Harrington as the Colts pulled Manning, and the game would end with a 9–41 blowout defeat for Detroit.

==== Week 13: vs. Arizona Cardinals ====
Week 13: Arizona Cardinals at Detroit Lions – Game summary

Quarter	1	2	3	4	Total
Cardinals	3	9	0	0	**12**
**Lions**	7	7	6	6	**26**

at Ford Field, Detroit, Michigan

- Date: December 5, 2004
- Game time: 12:00 p.m. CST
- Game weather: None (indoor stadium)
- Game attendance: 62,262
- Referee: Jeff Triplette
- TV announcers (FOX): Thom Brennaman, J.C. Pearson, Jennifer Hammond
- Box score

Game information

**First quarter**

- ARI – Neil Rackers 42-yard field goal, 11:09. Arizona 3–0 **Drive: 6 plays, 20 yards, 2:38.**
- DET – Tai Streets 17-yard pass from Joey Harrington (Jason Hanson kick good), 3:05. Detroit 7–3 **Drive: 9 plays, 76 yards, 5:16.**

**Second quarter**

- ARI – Neil Rackers 33-yard field goal, 14:13. Detroit 7–6 **Drive: 7 plays, 23 yards, 3:52.**
- DET – Kevin Jones 2-yard rush (Jason Hanson kick good), 8:13. Detroit 14–6 **Drive: 5 plays, 61 yards, 2:28.**
- ARI – Freddie Jones 33-yard pass from John Navarre (John Navarree pass to Larry Fitzgerald failed), 3:40. Detroit 14–12 **Drive: 9 plays, 80 yards, 4:33.**

**Third quarter**

- DET – Jason Hanson 45-yard field goal, 7:32. Detroit 17–12 **Drive: 8 plays, 38 yards, 3:35.**
- DET – Jason Hanson 22-yard field goal, 3:17. Detroit 20–12 **Drive: 4 plays, 7 yards, 1:26.**

**Fourth quarter**

- DET – Jason Hanson 31-yard field goal, 10:00. Detroit 23–12 **Drive: 9 plays, 67 yards, 4:51.**
- DET – Jason Hanson 36-yard field goal, 5:13. Detroit 26–12 **Drive: 7 plays, 12 yards, 2:47.**

**Top passers**

- ARI – John Navarre – 18/40, 168 yards, TD, 4 INT
- DET – Joey Harrington – 15/27, 196 yards, TD, INT

**Top receivers**

- ARI – Anquan Boldin – 3 receptions, 54 yards, TD
- DET – Roy Williams – 4 receptions, 76 yards

**Top rushers**

- ARI – Larry Croom – 18 rushes, 49 yards
- DET – Kevin Jones – 26 rushes, 196 yards, TD

In Week 13, the Lions hosted the Arizona Cardinals. The Lions opened up the game with a 3-and-out. After a short punt, the Cardinals kicked a 42-yard field goal to take the early 3–0 lead. After trading punts, Joey Harrington completed 4 straight passes before throwing a 17-yard touchdown pass to Tai Streets to go up 7–3. The Cardinals responded with a 23-yard drive ending in a 33-yard field goal. The two teams traded punts again, before Harrington hit Roy Williams on a deep 45-yard pass. The Lions capitalized two plays later with a Kevin Jones 2-yard rushing touchdown. The Cardinals responded with a 9-play, 80-yard drive capped off with a John Navarre 33-yard pass to Freddie Jones; the two-point conversion to Larry Fitzgerald was broken up by Dré Bly to settle the halftime score at 14–12.

Three punts began the second half before the Lions kicked a 45-yard field goal to go up 17–12. The Cardinals attempted to respond, but a Navarre pass was intercepted by Teddy Lehman. The Lions did not capitalize, and punted. However, they would get the ball right back as Bly intercepted a pass from Navarre, which set them up at Arizona's 11. The Lions would kick a 22-yard field goal. On the third straight drive, Navarre was intercepted, this time by Keith Smith. The Lions would kick another field goal to go up 23–12. On the fifth play of their next drive, a Navarre pass bounced off the helmet of Kalimba Edwards and fell into the hands of James Hall. The Lions kicked a 36-yard field goal to set the final score at 26–12 and break their five-game losing streak.

==== Week 14: at Green Bay Packers ====
Week 14: Detroit Lions at Green Bay Packers – Game summary

Quarter	1	2	3	4	Total
Lions	3	10	0	0	**13**
**Packers**	0	0	10	6	**16**

at Lambeau Field, Green Bay, Wisconsin

- Date: December 12, 2004
- Game time: 3:15 p.m. CST
- Game weather: Intermittent snow flurries, 33 °F (1 °C), wind NW 28 miles per hour (45 km/h)
- Game attendance: 70,497
- Referee: Larry Nemmers
- TV announcers (FOX): Dick Stockton, Daryl Johnston, Tony Siragusa
- Box score

Game information

**First quarter**

- DET – Jason Hanson 31-yard field goal, 7:15. Detroit 3–0 **Drive: 9 plays, 47 yards, 4:35.**

**Second quarter**

- DET – Kevin Jones 24-yard run (Jason Hanson kick good), 14:20. Detroit 10–0 **Drive: 6 plays, 48 yards, 3:12.**
- DET – Jason Hanson 36-yard field goal, 0:57. Detroit 13–0 **Drive: 9 plays, 59 yards, 4:18.**

**Third quarter**

- GNB – Ryan Longwell 36-yard field goal, 10:36. Detroit 13–3 **Drive: 9 plays, 63 yards, 4:24.**
- GNB – Donald Driver 23-yard pass from Brett Favre (Ryan Longwell kick good), 3:10. Detroit 13–10 **Drive: 10 plays, 90 yards, 5:05.**

**Fourth quarter**

- GNB – Ryan Longwell 28-yard field goal, 10:46. Tied 13–13 **Drive: 5 plays, 44 yards, 0:59.**
- GNB – Ryan Longwell 23-yard field goal, 0:02. Green Bay 16–13 **Drive: 10 plays, 37 yards, 3:25.**

**Top passers**

- DET – Joey Harrington – 5/22, 47 yards
- GNB – Brett Favre – 19/36, 188 yards, TD

**Top receivers**

- DET – Az-Zahir Hakim – 5 receptions, 20 yards
- GNB – Donald Driver – 4 receptions, 87 yards, TD

**Top rushers**

- DET – Kevin Jones – 33 rushes, 156 yards, TD
- GNB – Ahman Green – 23 rushes, 76 yards

In Week 14, the Lions traveled to Green Bay, Wisconsin to face the Green Bay Packers. Both teams punted on their opening possessions. On their second drive, the Lions, helped by a 27-yard defensive pass interference call, kicked a 31-yard field goal to go up 3–0. After three straight punts, the Lions got the ball on Green Bay's 48-yard line. After gaining a first down, Kevin Jones took the ball 24-yards for a touchdown to extend their lead to 10–0. After another three punts, the Lions took the ball into the two-minute warning. They brought the ball down to Green Bay's 18 to kick a 36-yard field goal, bringing the halftime score to a 13–0 shutout.

On the opening possession of the half, the Packers took their drive 9 plays and 63 yards to get on the board with a Ryan Longwell 36-yard field goal. After a Detroit punt, the Packers looked to score on a 79-yard pass from Brett Favre to Ahman Green, but an offensive holding penalty brought it back. They would eventually score on a Favre pass to Donald Driver to pull within 3. Another three punts set the Packers up at their own 46. They would take 59 seconds to convert on a 28-yard field goal to tie the game at 13 apiece. The Lions had two possessions to score, but they punted on both, including a punt with 3:33 left. The Packers would drain 3:25 off the clock on their last drive to kick a game-winning 23-yard field goal, putting the final score at 13–16.

==== Week 15: vs. Minnesota Vikings ====
Week 15: Minnesota Vikings at Detroit Lions – Game summary

Quarter	1	2	3	4	Total
Vikings	7	7	0	14	**28**
**Lions**	3	10	0	14	**27**

at Ford Field, Detroit, Michigan

- Date: December 19, 2004
- Game time: 12:00 p.m. CST
- Game weather: None (indoor stadium)
- Game attendance: 62,337
- Referee: Bernie Kukar
- TV announcers (FOX): Sam Rosen, Bill Maas, Jay Glazer
- Box score

Game information

**First quarter**

- DET – Jason Hanson 32-yard field goal, 8:34. Detroit 3–0 **Drive: 13 plays, 58 yards, 6:26.**
- MIN – Nate Burleson 36-yard pass from Daunte Culpepper (Morten Andersen kick good), 1:58. Minnesota 7–3 **Drive: 12 plays, 85 yards, 6:36.**

**Second quarter**

- MIN – Randy Moss 82-yard pass from Daunte Culpepper (Morten Andersen kick good), 9:53. Minnesota 14–3 **Drive: 3 plays, 68 yards, 1:11.**
- DET – Kevin Jones 16-yard run (Jason Hanson kick good), 3:21. Minnesota 14–10 **Drive: 11 plays, 82 yards, 6:32.**
- DET – Jason Hanson 23-yard field goal, 0:30. Minnesota 14–13 **Drive: 8 plays, 66 yards, 1:26.**

**Third quarter**

- No scoring plays

**Fourth quarter**

- MIN – Nate Burleson 37-yard pass from Daunte Culpepper (Morten Andersen kick good), 8:44. Minnesota 21–13 **Drive: 8 plays, 68 yards, 3:55.**
- DET – Roy Williams 9-yard pass from Joey Harrington (Joey Harrington–Tai Streets pass good), 6:11. Tied 21–21 **Drive: 6 plays, 82 yards, 2:33.**
- MIN – Moe Williams 11-yard run (Morten Andersen kick good), 1:37. Minnesota 28–21 **Drive: 10 plays, 83 yards, 4:34.**
- DET – Roy Williams 1-yard pass from Joey Harrington (Kick aborted), 0:08. Minnesota 28–27 **Drive: 9 plays, 80 yards, 1:29.**

**Top passers**

- MIN – Daunte Culpepper – 25/35, 404 yards, 3 TD, INT
- DET – Joey Harrington – 25/44, 361 yards, 2 TD, 2 INT

**Top receivers**

- MIN – Nate Burleson – 5 receptions, 134 yards, 2 TD
- DET – Az-Zahir Hakim – 4 receptions, 108 yards

**Top rushers**

- MIN – Michael Bennett – 13 rushes, 51 yards
- DET – Kevin Jones – 19 rushes, 79 yards, TD

In Week 15, the Lions hosted the Minnesota Vikings. The Lions won the opening toss, elected to receive, and drove downfield 58 yards to kick a 32-yard field goal. The Vikings responded with an 85-yard drive, capped off by a Daunte Culpepper 36-yard touchdown pass to Nate Burleson. After three punts moved them into the second quarter, the Vikings began their drive at their own 32. A sack by Cory Redding set the Vikings up with a 3rd and 24. On that play, Culpepper found Randy Moss who housed it for an 82-yard touchdown. The Lions responded with a touchdown drive of their own after 5 straight Kevin Jones carries put them in the endzone. After the Vikings were forced to punt, the Lions kicked a 23-yard field goal to set the halftime score at 13–14.

After a Minnesota punt to begin the second half, the Lions gave the ball back with a Harrington interception. Minnesota then gave it right back with a Culpepper interception by Brock Marion. However, a third turnover, this time from a Kevin Jones fumble, put Minnesota at their own 29. After three punts, Harrington threw his second interception of the game in Minnesota territory. Minnesota capitalized with a Culpepper 37-yard pass to Burleson to take the 8-point lead at 21–13. The Lions would respond, driving 82-yards in 6 plays capped off by a Harrington 9-yard touchdown pass to Roy Williams. On their two-point conversion attempt, a Harrington pass to Tai Streets fell incomplete. However, a defensive holding penalty gave the Lions another try. They would convert with another Harrington–Streets pass to tie the game at 21 apiece. Minnesota took 4:34 off the clock on their next drive when they scored with a Moe Williams 11-yard rush. Down 7 with 1:47 left in the game, the Lions began their next drive at their own 20. They got into Minnesota territory with a 15-yard pass from Harrington to Streets, spiking the ball with 0:35 left on the clock. They got down to Minnesota's 15 with a 23-yard reception from Az-Zahir Hakim, where they would stop the clock with 19 seconds left. After a defensive pass interference call put them at Minnesota's 1, the Lions scored with a Roy Williams 1-yard touchdown reception. With just an extra point to tie the game, the snap from rookie Don Muhlbach was low, bouncing off the turf to the holder who was tackled by a Minnesota defender, effectively sealing the 27–28 loss for the Lions as they fell to 5–9.

==== Week 16: vs. Chicago Bears ====
Week 16: Chicago Bears at Detroit Lions – Game summary

Quarter	1	2	3	4	Total
Bears	0	0	6	7	**13**
**Lions**	3	10	0	14	**27**

at Ford Field, Detroit, Michigan

- Date: December 26, 2004
- Game time: 12:00 p.m. CST
- Game weather: None (indoor stadium)
- Game attendance: 61,924
- Referee: Terry McAulay
- TV announcers (FOX): Dan Miller, J.C. Pearson, Jay Glazer
- Box score

Game information

**First quarter**

- DET – Jason Hanson 31-yard field goal, 3:06. Detroit 3–0 **Drive: 5 plays, 46 yards, 2:22.**

**Second quarter**

- DET – Kevin Jones 1-yard run (Jason Hanson kick good), 11:30. Detroit 10–0 **Drive: 8 plays, 70 yards, 4:35.**
- DET – Jason Hanson 39-yard field goal, 5:50. Detroit 13–0 **Drive: 8 plays, 21 yards, 4:02.**
- DET – Jason Hanson 34-yard field goal, 0:00. Detroit 16–0 **Drive: 11 plays, 62 yards, 1:27.**

**Third quarter**

- CHI – Lance Briggs 38-yard interception return (Chad Hutchinson–Desmond Clark pass failed), 3:40. Detroit 16–6.

**Fourth quarter**

- DET – Jason Hanson 40-yard field goal, 11:29. Detroit 19–6 **Drive: 6 plays, 40 yards, 2:41.**
- CHI – Jason McKie 15-yard pass from Chad Hutchinson (Paul Edinger kick good), 7:04. Detroit 19–13 **Drive: 9 plays, 90 yards, 4:25.**

**Top passers**

- CHI – Chad Hutchinson – 20/35, 114 yards, TD
- DET – Joey Harrington – 15/30, 166 yards, INT

**Top receivers**

- CHI – Thomas Jones – 4 receptions, 34 yards
- DET – Reggie Swinton – 2 receptions, 42 yards

**Top rushers**

- CHI – Thomas Jones – 22 rushes, 109 yards
- DET – Kevin Jones – 25 rushes, 123 yards, TD

In Week 16, the Lions hosted the Chicago Bears. After trading two punts each, the Lions were set up on their own 42. After a Kevin Jones 39-yard run, the Lions kicked a 31-yard field goal. After forcing the Bears to punt, the Lions drove downfield and, with help from a Harrington 26-yard pass to Roy Williams, scored on a Kevin Jones 1-yard run. After another punt from the Bears, the Lions kicked a 39-yard field goal to go up 13–0. They would put another field goal on the board, this time from 34, to settle the halftime score at 16–0.

The Bears fumbled on their opening possession, but the Lions could not capitalize and punted. After three more punts, the Bears got on the board after a throw under pressure from Harrington was intercepted and returned for a touchdown by Lance Briggs; the two-point conversion fell short. After trading punts, the Lions extended their lead with a Hanson 40-yard field goal. The Bears would respond with a Chris Hutchinson 15-yard touchdown pass to Jason McKie to pull the Bears within 6 at 19–13. After a Lions punt, the Bears turned the ball over on downs with 1:17 left, sealing the win for the Lions.

==== Week 17: at Tennessee Titans ====
Week 17: Detroit Lions at Tennessee Titans – Game summary

Quarter	1	2	3	4	Total
Lions	3	7	3	6	**19**
**Titans**	7	7	7	3	**24**

at The Coliseum, Nashville, Tennessee

- Date: January 2, 2005
- Game time: 12:00 p.m. CST
- Game weather: Cloudy, 62 °F (17 °C)
- Game attendance: 68,809
- Referee: Ed Hochuli
- TV announcers (FOX): Dan Miller, J.C. Pearson, Jennifer Hammond
- Box score

Game information

**First quarter**

- TEN – Keith Bulluck 39-yard defensive fumble return (Gary Anderson kick good), 10:00. Tennessee 7–0.
- DET – Jason Hanson 26-yard field goal, 3:16. Tennessee 7–3 **Drive: 13 plays, 72 yards, 6:44.**

**Second quarter**

- DET – Cory Schlesinger 21-yard pass from Joey Harrington (Jason Hanson kick good), 5:42. Detroit 10–7 **Drive: 10 plays, 75 yards, 4:49.**
- TEN – Drew Bennett 32-yard pass from Billy Volek (Gary Anderson kick good), 1:06. Tennessee 14–10 **Drive: 11 plays, 90 yards, 4:36.**

**Third quarter**

- DET – Jason Hanson 26-yard field goal, 3:25. Tennessee 14–13 **Drive: 7 plays, 67 yards, 3:22.**
- TEN – Antowain Smith 2-yard rush (Gary Anderson kick good), 1:00. Tennessee 21–13 **Drive: 6 plays, 80 yards, 2:25.**

**Fourth quarter**

- TEN – Gary Anderson 40-yard field goal, 10:25. Tennessee 24–13 **8 plays, 46 yards, 3:45.**
- DET – Roy Williams 17-yard pass from Joey Harrington (Harrington–Williams pass failed), 4:11. Tennessee 24–19 **Drive: 10 plays, 82 yards, 3:39.**

**Top passers**

- DET – Joey Harrington – 33/49, 346 yards, 2 TD, INT
- TEN – Billy Volek – 16/28, 175 yards, TD

**Top receivers**

- DET – Stephen Alexander – 6 receptions, 66 yards
- TEN – Ben Troupe – 4 receptions, 75 yards

**Top rushers**

- DET – Kevin Jones – 19 rushes, 72 yards
- TEN – Antowain Smith – 21 rushes, 89 yards, TD

In the last game of the season, the Lions traveled to Nashville, Tennessee to play the Tennessee Titans. Both teams punted on their opening possessions of the game. After nearing Titans territory, Joey Harrington was strip-sacked by Keith Bulluck who took it 39 yards for the touchdown. The Lions responded with a 13 play drive capped off by a Jason Hanson 26-yard field goal. After three straight punts, the Lions took the lead on a Harrington 21-yard touchdown pass to Cory Schlesinger. The Titans would take the lead right back on their next drive with a Billy Volek 32-yard touchdown pass from Drew Bennett, putting the halftime score at 10–14 for the Lions.

Three punts began the second half before the Lions kicked a 26-yard field goal to pull within one. The Titans, with help from an Antowain Smith 43-yard run, scored on a Smith 2-yard run to go up 8. The Lions would punt back to the Titans, who extended their lead with a 40-yard field goal from Gary Anderson. On the second play of their responding drive, Harrington threw an interception that was returned 43 yards to the Lions' 9. The Titans looked to capitalize on a 27-yard field goal, but it was blocked by Shaun Rogers. The Lions, starting on their own 18, drove downfield 82-yards to score on a 17-yard pass from Harrington to Roy Williams; the two point conversion fell short. The Titans were forced to punt on their next possession, giving the Lions the ball at their own 14 with 2:52 left. The Lions got into Tennessee territory at the two minute warning. They got down to Tennessee's 16 yard line, but three straight incompletions from Harrington sealed the 19–24 loss for the Lions, finalizing their record at 6–10.

=== Standings ===
==== Division ====
NFC North
	W	L	T	PCT	DIV	CONF	PF	PA	STK
^{(3)} Green Bay Packers	10	6	0	.625	5–1	9–3	424	380	W2
^{(6)} Minnesota Vikings	8	8	0	.500	3–3	5–7	405	395	L2
Detroit Lions	6	10	0	.375	2–4	5–7	296	350	L1
Chicago Bears	5	11	0	.313	2–4	4–8	231	331	L4

==== Conference ====
NFC
#	Team	Division	W	L	T	PCT	DIV	CONF	SOS	SOV	STK
**Division leaders**
1	Philadelphia Eagles	East	13	3	0	.813	6–0	11–1	.453	.409	L2
2	Atlanta Falcons	South	11	5	0	.688	4–2	8–4	.420	.432	L2
3	Green Bay Packers	North	10	6	0	.625	5–1	9–3	.457	.419	W2
4	Seattle Seahawks	West	9	7	0	.563	3–3	8–4	.445	.368	W2
**Wild cards**
5 (Note: St. Louis clinched the NFC #5 seed instead of Minnesota or New Orleans based on better conference record (7–5 to Minnesota’s 5–7 to New Orleans’ 6–6).)	St. Louis Rams	West	8	8	0	.500	5–1	7–5	.488	.438	W2
6 (Note: Minnesota clinched the NFC #6 seed instead of New Orleans based on head-to-head victory.)	Minnesota Vikings	North	8	8	0	.500	3–3	5–7	.480	.406	L2
**Did not qualify for the postseason**
7	New Orleans Saints	South	8	8	0	.500	3–3	6–6	.465	.427	W4
8	Carolina Panthers	South	7	9	0	.438	3–3	6–6	.496	.366	L1
9 (Note: Detroit finished ahead of Arizona and New York Giants based upon head-to-head record (2–0 versus Arizona’s 1–1 and New York Giants’ 0–2). Division tiebreak was initially used to eliminate Dallas and Washington.)	Detroit Lions	North	6	10	0	.375	2–4	5–7	.496	.417	L2
10	Arizona Cardinals	West	6	10	0	.375	2–4	5–7	.461	.417	W1
11 (Note: New York Giants finished ahead of Dallas and Washington in the NFC East based on better head-to-head record (3–1 to Dallas‘ 2–2 to Washington’s 1–3).)	New York Giants	East	6	10	0	.375	3–3	5–7	.516	.417	W1
12 (Note: Dallas finished ahead of Washington in the NFC East based on head-to-head sweep.)	Dallas Cowboys	East	6	10	0	.375	2–4	5–7	.516	.375	L1
13	Washington Redskins	East	6	10	0	.375	1–5	6–6	.477	.333	W1
14 (Note: Tampa Bay finished ahead of Chicago based upon head-to-head victory.)	Tampa Bay Buccaneers	South	5	11	0	.313	2–4	4–8	.477	.413	L4
15	Chicago Bears	North	5	11	0	.313	2–4	4–8	.465	.388	L4
16	San Francisco 49ers	West	2	14	0	.125	2–4	2–10	.488	.375	L3
**Tiebreakers** (Note: When breaking ties for three or more teams under the NFL's rules, they are first broken within divisions, then comparing only the highest-ranked remaining team from each division.)
