= 2004 Jacksonville Jaguars season =

10th season in franchise history

- Owner: Wayne Weaver
- General manager: James "Shack" Harris
- Head coach: Jack Del Rio
- Offensive coordinator: Bill Musgrave
- Defensive coordinator: Mike Smith
- Home stadium: Alltel Stadium

Results
- Record: 9–7
- Division place: 2nd AFC South
- Playoffs: Did not qualify
- Pro Bowlers: DT Marcus Stroud; DT John Henderson

Uniform

The 2004 Jacksonville Jaguars season was the tenth season in franchise history, Jack Del Rio's second year as the head coach of the Jacksonville Jaguars and Byron Leftwich's first full year as starting quarterback. In a time of transition for the franchise, Del Rio's coaching and Leftwich's play helped to pull the Jaguars out of a four season slump to a finish of 9–7, placing second in the AFC South. However, they missed the playoffs for the fifth successive season.

== Offseason ==
=== NFL draft ===
2004 Jacksonville Jaguars draft
Round	Pick	Player	Position	College	Notes
1	9	Reggie Williams	Wide receiver	Washington	
2	39	Daryl Smith	Linebacker	Georgia Tech	
2	55	Greg Jones	Fullback	Florida State	
3	86	Jorge Cordova	Linebacker	Nevada	
4	118	Anthony Maddox	Defensive tackle	Delta State	
4	120	Ernest Wilford	Wide receiver	Virginia Tech	
5	179	Josh Scobee	Kicker	Louisiana Tech	
5	150	Chris Thompson	Cornerback	Nicholls State	
5	159	Sean Bubin	Offensive tackle	Illinois	
7	249	Bobby McCray	Defensive end	Florida	
Made roster † Pro Football Hall of Fame * Made at least one Pro Bowl during career

== Staff ==
2004 Jacksonville Jaguars staff
Front office: Chairman/chief executive officer – Wayne Weaver; Head coaches: Head coach – Jack Del Rio; Assistant head coach – Steve Shafer; Offensive coaches: Offensive coordinator – Bill Musgrave; Quarterbacks/wide receivers – Ken Anderson; Running backs/assistant special teams – Anthony Lynn; Tight ends – Alfredo Roberts; Offensive line – Paul Boudreau; Offensive assistant/assistant offensive line – Andy Heck	Defensive coaches: Defensive coordinator – Mike Smith; Defensive line – Ray Hamilton; Linebackers – Mike Haluchak; Defensive backs – Alvin Reynolds; Defensive assistant – Todd Howard; Special teams coaches: Special teams coordinator – Pete Rodriguez; Assistant special teams – Bob Ligashesky; Special teams intern – Charles Banks; Strength and conditioning: Strength and conditioning – Mark Asanovich; Assistant strength and conditioning – Bob Rogucki; Assistant strength and conditioning – Les Ebert

== Final roster ==
2004 Jacksonville Jaguars roster
Quarterbacks (QB): 9 David Garrard; 5 Quinn Gray; 7 Byron Leftwich; Running backs (RB): 34 David Allen; 44 Marc Edwards FB; 45 Chris Fuamatu-Maʻafala FB; 33 Greg Jones FB; 28 Fred Taylor; 22 LaBrandon Toefield; Wide receivers (WR): 16 Troy Edwards; 85 Cortez Hankton; 82 Jimmy Smith; 19 Ernest Wilford; 11 Reggie Williams; Tight ends (TE): 80 Kyle Brady; 86 Brian Jones; 83 Todd Yoder	Offensive linemen (OL): 77 Mike Compton G; 68 Derrick Fletcher G; 67 Vince Manuwai G; 63 Brad Meester C; 65 Chris Naeole G; 62 Dennis Norman G; 66 Brett Romberg C; 76 Ephraim Salaam OT; 70 Bob Whitfield OT; 74 Maurice Williams OT; Defensive linemen (DL): 55 Greg Favors DE; 98 John Henderson DT; 91 Anthony Maddox DT; 93 Bobby McCray DE; 78 Elton Patterson DE; 90 Derrick Ransom DT; 99 Marcus Stroud DT	Linebackers (LB): 51 Akin Ayodele OLB; 50 Tony Gilbert MLB; 56 Jason Gildon OLB; 57 Tommy Hendricks OLB; 54 Mike Peterson MLB; 52 Daryl Smith OLB; Defensive backs (DB): 21 Juran Bolden CB; 35 Deke Cooper FS; 20 Donovin Darius SS; 37 Deon Grant FS; 27 Rashean Mathis CB; 26 David Richardson CB; 41 Nick Sorensen SS; 24 Kiwaukee Thomas CB; 29 Chris Thompson CB; 30 Dewayne Washington CB; Special teams (ST): 2 Chris Hanson P; 10 Josh Scobee K; 88 Joe Zelenka LS	Practice squad: 60 Nathaniel Adibi DE; 40 Rich Alexis RB; 42 Marcell Allmond CB; 47 Omari Hand DE; -- Gabe Nyenhuis DE; 64 Joe Tate G; 15 Huey Whittaker WR; Reserve: 94 Lionel Barnes DE (IR); 58 Jorge Cordova OLB (IR); 97 Brandon Green DE (IR); 96 Matt Leonard DT (IR); 6 Seth Marler K (IR); 92 Rob Meier DE (IR); 72 Mike Pearson OT (IR); 95 Paul Spicer DE (IR); 87 George Wrighster TE (IR); Rookies in italics 53 active, 9 reserve, 7 practice squad

== Preseason ==
Week	Date	Opponent	Result	Record	Venue
1	August 14	at Miami Dolphins	L 5–16	0–1	Pro Player Stadium
2	August 20	Tampa Bay Buccaneers	W 14–6	1–1	Alltel Stadium
3	August 27	Green Bay Packers	W 9–7	2–1	Alltel Stadium
4	September 2	at New England Patriots	W 31–0	3–1	Gillette Stadium

== Regular season ==
=== Schedule ===
In addition to their regular games with AFC South rivals, the Jaguars played teams from the AFC West and NFC North as per the schedule rotation, and also played intraconference games against the Steelers and the Bills based on divisional positions from 2003.

Week	Date	Opponent	Result	Record	Venue	Attendance
1	September 12	at Buffalo Bills	**W** 13–10	1–0	Ralph Wilson Stadium	72,389
2	September 19	Denver Broncos	**W** 7–6	2–0	Alltel Stadium	69,127
3	September 26	at **Tennessee Titans**	**W** 15–12	3–0	The Coliseum	68,932
4	October 3	Indianapolis Colts	**L** 17–24	3–1	Alltel Stadium	73,114
5	October 10	at San Diego Chargers	**L** 21–34	3–2	Qualcomm Stadium	52,101
6	October 17	Kansas City Chiefs	**W** 22–16	4–2	Alltel Stadium	66,413
7	October 24	at **Indianapolis Colts**	**W** 27–24	5–2	RCA Dome	56,615
8	October 31	at **Houston Texans**	**L** 6–20	5–3	Reliant Stadium	70,502
9	Bye					
10	November 14	**Detroit Lions**	**W** 23–17 (OT)	6–3	Alltel Stadium	66,431
11	November 21	**Tennessee Titans**	**L** 15–18	6–4	Alltel Stadium	69,703
12	November 28	at Minnesota Vikings	**L** 16–27	6–5	Hubert H. Humphrey Metrodome	64,004
13	December 5	Pittsburgh Steelers	**L** 16–17	6–6	Alltel Stadium	76,877
14	December 12	**Chicago Bears**	**W** 22–3	7–6	Alltel Stadium	67,572
15	December 19	at Green Bay Packers	**W** 28–25	8–6	Lambeau Field	70,437
16	December 26	**Houston Texans**	**L** 0–21	8–7	Alltel Stadium	66,227
17	January 2	at Oakland Raiders	**W** 13–6	9–7	Oakland Coliseum	41,112

Note: Intra-division opponents are in bold text.

=== Game summaries ===
==== Week 1: at Buffalo Bills ====
Week One: Jacksonville Jaguars at Buffalo Bills – Game summary

Quarter	1	2	3	4	Total
**Jaguars**	0	3	3	7	**13**
Bills	7	0	0	3	**10**

at Ralph Wilson Stadium, Orchard Park, New York

- Date: September 12, 2004
- Game time: 1:00 p.m. EDT
- Game weather: Sunny, 74 °F (23 °C)
- Game attendance: 72,389
- Referee: Ron Winter
- TV announcers (CBS): Don Criqui and Steve Tasker
- Recap, Game Book

Game information

**First quarter**

- BUF – Eric Moulds 17-yard pass from Drew Bledsoe (Rian Lindell kick), 2:48. Bills 7–0. **Drive: 2 plays, 18 yards, 0:46.**

**Second quarter**

- JAX – Josh Scobee 25-yard field goal, 0:17. Bills 7–3. **Drive: 11 plays, 54 yards, 4:29.**

**Third quarter**

- JAX – Josh Scobee 27-yard field goal, 4:32. Bills 7–6. **Drive: 5 plays, 41 yards, 2:18.**

**Fourth quarter**

- BUF – Rian Lindell 25-yard field goal, 10:15. Bills 10–7. **Drive: 4 plays, -4 yards, 1:51.**
- JAX – Ernest Wilford 7-yard pass from Byron Leftwich (Josh Scobee kick), 0:00. Jaguars 13–10. **Drive: 14 plays, 80 yards, 2:07.**

**Top passers**

- JAX – Byron Leftwich – 18/36, 147 yards, TD, 2 INT
- BUF – Drew Bledsoe – 17/26, 153 yards, TD

**Top rushers**

- JAX – Fred Taylor – 17 rushes, 61 yards
- BUF – Travis Henry – 23 rushes, 75 yards

**Top receivers**

- JAX – Jimmy Smith – 4 receptions, 83 yards
- BUF – Eric Moulds – 8 receptions, 75 yards, TD

==== Week 2: vs. Denver Broncos ====
Week Two: Denver Broncos at Jacksonville Jaguars – Game summary

Quarter	1	2	3	4	Total
Broncos	0	6	0	0	**6**
**Jaguars**	0	7	0	0	**7**

at Alltel Stadium, Jacksonville, Florida

- Date: September 19, 2004
- Game time: 1:00 p.m. EDT
- Game weather: 78 °F (26 °C)
- Game attendance: 69,127
- Referee: Gerry Austin
- Recap, Game Book

Game information

**First quarter**

- No scoring plays.

**Second quarter**

- JAX – Ernest Wilford 12-yard pass from Byron Leftwich (Josh Scobee kick), 12:39. Jaguars 7–0. **Drive: 5 plays, 32 yards, 3:19.**
- DEN – Jason Elam 44-yard field goal, 9:37. Jaguars 7–3. **Drive: 7 plays, 47 yards, 3:02.**
- DEN – Jason Elam 22-yard field goal, 0:00. Jaguars 7–6. **Drive: 10 plays, 76 yards, 3:11.**

**Third quarter**

- No scoring plays.

**Fourth quarter**

- No scoring plays.

**Top passers**

- DEN – Jake Plummer – 23/39, 250 yards
- JAX – Byron Leftwich – 8/16, 120 yards, TD

**Top rushers**

- DEN – Quentin Griffin – 25 rushes, 66 yards
- JAX – Fred Taylor – 16 rushes, 54 yards

**Top receivers**

- BUF – Rod Smith – 6 receptions, 83 yards
- JAX – Jimmy Smith – 3 receptions, 69 yards

==== Week 3: at Tennessee Titans ====
Week Three: Jacksonville Jaguars at Tennessee Titans – Game summary

Quarter	1	2	3	4	Total
Jaguars	0	0	7	8	**15**
**Titans**	0	6	0	6	**12**

at The Coliseum, Nashville, Tennessee

- Date: September 26, 2004
- Game time: 12:00 p.m. CST
- Game weather: Sunny, 76 °F (24 °C)
- Game attendance: 68,932
- Referee: Larry Nemers
- Recap, Game Book

Game information

**First quarter**

- No scoring plays.

**Second quarter**

- TEN – Gary Anderson 26-yard field goal, 9:53. Titans 3–0. **Drive: 15 plays, 63 yards, 8:17.**
- TEN – Gary Anderson 40-yard field goal, 3:20. Titans 6–0. **Drive: 8 plays, 33 yards, 4:52.**

**Third quarter**

- JAX – George Wrighster 7-yard pass from Byron Leftwich (Josh Scobee kick), 3:15. Jaguars 7–6. **Drive: 7 plays, 73 yards, 3:46.**

**Fourth quarter**

- TEN – Chris Brown 26-yard run (pass failed), 5:37. Titans 12–7. **Drive: 10 plays, 74 yards, 4:47.**
- JAX – Fred Taylor 1-yard run (pass succeeded), 0:09. Jaguars 15–12. **Drive: 13 plays, 69 yards, 5:28.**

Top passers

- JAX – Byron Leftwich – 14/20, 124 yards, TD
- TEN – Steve McNair – 16/26, 143 yards, INT

Top rushers

- JAX – Fred Taylor – 17 rushes, 81 yards, TD
- TEN – Chris Brown – 23 rushes, 101 yards, TD

Top receivers

- JAX – Jimmy Smith – 3 receptions, 58 yards
- TEN – Drew Bennett – 6 receptions, 55 yards

==== Week 4: vs. Indianapolis Colts ====
Week Four: Indianapolis Colts at Jacksonville Jaguars – Game summary

Quarter	1	2	3	4	Total
**Colts**	7	3	7	7	**24**
Jaguars	0	3	3	11	**17**

at Alltel Stadium, Jacksonville, Florida

- Date: October 3, 2004
- Game time: 1:00 p.m. EDT
- Game weather: 85 °F (29 °C)
- Game attendance: 73,114
- Referee: Walt Anderson
- Recap, Game Book

Game information

**First quarter**

- IND – Marvin Harrison 15-yard pass from Peyton Manning (Mike Vanderjagt kick), 5:55. Colts 7–0. **Drive: 7 plays, 75 yards, 2:51.**

**Second quarter**

- IND – Mike Vanderjagt 46-yard field goal, 0:40. Colts 10–0. **Drive: 9 plays, 61 yards, 1:38.**
- JAX – Josh Scobee 48-yard field goal, 0:00. Colts 10–3. **Drive: 6 plays, 46 yards, 0:40.**

**Third quarter**

- JAX – Josh Scobee 42-yard field goal, 8:46. Colts 10–6. **Drive: 11 plays, 50 yards, 6:14.**
- IND – Marcus Pollard 16-yard pass from Peyton Manning (Mike Vanderjagt kick), 2:54. Colts 17–6. **Drive: 10 plays, 83 yards, 5:52.**

**Fourth quarter**

- JAX – Josh Scobee 22-yard field goal, 12:03. Colts 17–9. **Drive: 11 plays, 56 yards, 5:51.**
- JAX – Jimmy Smith 40-yard pass from Byron Leftwich (pass succeeded), 10:37. Tied 17–17. **Drive: 4 plays, 49 yards, 1:16.**
- IND – Edgerrin James 3-yard run (Mike Vanderjagt kick), 3:33. Colts 24–17. **Drive: 13 plays, 74 yards, 7:04.**

Top passers

- IND – Peyton Manning – 20/29, 220 yards, 2 TD, INT
- JAX – Byron Leftwich – 29/41, 318 yards, TD

Top rushers

- IND – Edgerrin James – 19 rushes, 83 yards, TD
- JAX – Fred Taylor – 21 rushes, 68 yards

Top receivers

- IND – Brandon Stokley – 8 receptions, 97 yards
- JAX – Jimmy Smith – 3 receptions, 59 yards, TD

==== Week 5: at San Diego Chargers ====
Week Five: Jacksonville Jaguars at San Diego Chargers – Game summary

Quarter	1	2	3	4	Total
Jaguars	0	7	0	14	**21**
**Chargers**	14	7	6	7	**34**

at Qualcomm Stadium, San Diego, California

- Date: October 10, 2004
- Game time: 1:05 p.m. PDT
- Game weather: Clear and sunny, 68 °F (20 °C)
- Game attendance: 52,101
- Referee: Tony Corrente
- TV announcers (CBS): Ian Eagle, Solomon Wilcots and Scott Kaplan
- Recap, Game Book

Game information

**First quarter**

- SDG – Antonio Gates 1-yard pass from Drew Brees (Nate Kaeding kick), 10:14. Chargers 7–0. **Drive: 11 plays, 66 yards, 4:46.**
- SDG – LaDainian Tomlinson 1-yard run (Nate Kaeding kick), 4:03. Chargers 14–0. **Drive: 8 plays, 76 yards, 4:13.**

**Second quarter**

- SDG – Antonio Gates 11-yard pass from Drew Brees (Nate Kaeding kick), 9:23. Chargers 21–0. **Drive: 5 plays, 21 yards, 2:03.**
- JAC – Chris Fuamatu-Maʻafala 1-yard run (Josh Scobee kick), 1:33. Chargers 21–7. **Drive: 15 plays, 77 yards, 7:50.**

**Third quarter**

- SDG – Nate Kaeding 21-yard field goal, 7:15. Chargers 24–7. **Drive: 12 plays, 73 yards, 6:31.**
- SDG – Nate Kaeding 28-yard field goal, 0:46. Chargers 27–7. **Drive: 4 plays, 3 yards, 0:54.**

**Fourth quarter**

- JAC – Byron Leftwich 2-yard run (Josh Scobee kick), 10:42. Chargers 27–14. **Drive: 14 plays, 77 yards, 5:04.**
- SDG – Jesse Chatman 41-yard run (Nate Kaeding kick), 9:54. Chargers 34–14. **Drive: 2 plays, 72 yards, 0:48.**
- JAC – Cortez Hankton 7-yard pass from Byron Leftwich (Josh Scobee kick), 7:21. Chargers 34–21. **Drive: 7 plays, 79 yards, 2:33.**

**Top passers**

- JAC – Byron Leftwich – 36/54, 357 yards, TD, 2 INT
- SDG – Drew Brees – 17/26, 211 yards, 2 TD

**Top rushers**

- JAC – Fred Taylor – 11 rushes, 64 yards
- SDG – Jesse Chatman – 11 rushes, 103 yards, TD

**Top receivers**

- JAC – Jimmy Smith – 8 receptions, 113 yards
- SDG – Antonio Gates – 8 receptions, 93 yards, 2 TD

==== Week 6: vs. Kansas City Chiefs ====
Week Six: Kansas City Chiefs at Jacksonville Jaguars – Game summary

Quarter	1	2	3	4	Total
Chiefs	3	0	7	6	**16**
**Jaguars**	7	7	0	8	**22**

at Alltel Stadium, Jacksonville, Florida

- Date: October 17, 2004
- Game time: 1:00 p.m. EDT
- Game weather: 78 °F (26 °C)
- Game attendance: 66,413
- Referee: Ed Hochuli
- TV announcers (CBS): Kevin Harlan and Randy Cross
- Recap, Game Book

Game information

**First quarter**

- JAX – Byron Leftwich 7-yard run (Josh Scobee kick), 8:34. Jaguars 7–0. **Drive: 13 plays, 75 yards, 6:26.**
- KC – Lawrence Tynes 31-yard field goal, 2:02. Jaguars 7–3. **Drive: 5 plays, 53 yards, 2:30.**

**Second quarter**

- JAX – Fred Taylor 64-yard pass from Byron Leftwich (Josh Scobee kick), 14:08. Jaguars 14–3. **Drive: 5 plays, 79 yards, 2:54.**

**Third quarter**

- KC – Tony Gonzalez 24-yard pass from Trent Green (Lawrence Tynes kick), 10:46. Jaguars 14–10. **Drive: 8 plays, 68 yards, 4:14.**

**Fourth quarter**

- KC – Priest Holmes 28-yard pass from Trent Green (kick failed, hit right upright), 4:45. Chiefs 16–14. **Drive: 9 plays, 75 yards, 4:45.**
- JAX – Cortez Hankton 14-yard pass from Byron Leftwich (Byron Leftwich–Reggie Williams pass), 0:45. Jaguars 22–16. **Drive: 8 plays, 67 yards, 1:31.**

**Top passers**

- KC – Trent Green – 23/33, 315 yards, 2 TD, INT
- JAX – Byron Leftwich – 24/36, 298 yards, 2 TD

**Top rushers**

- KC – Priest Holmes – 19 rushes, 75 yards
- JAX – Fred Taylor – 19 rushes, 66 yards

**Top receivers**

- KC – Johnnie Morton – 7 receptions, 111 yards
- JAX – Jimmy Smith – 7 receptions, 91 yards

==== Week 7: at Indianapolis Colts ====
Week Seven: Jacksonville Jaguars at Indianapolis Colts – Game summary

Quarter	1	2	3	4	Total
**Jaguars**	0	10	3	14	**27**
Colts	0	14	0	10	**24**

at RCA Dome, Indianapolis, Indiana

- Date: October 24, 2004
- Game time: 1:00 p.m. EST
- Game weather: None (indoor stadium)
- Game attendance: 56,615
- Referee: Terry McAulay
- Recap, Game Book

Game information

**First quarter**

- No scoring plays.

**Second quarter**

- JAX – Kyle Brady 4-yard pass from Byron Leftwich (Josh Scobee kick), 13:27. Jaguars 7–0. **Drive: 7 plays, 48 yards, 4:03.**
- IND – Marvin Harrison 7-yard pass from Peyton Manning (Mike Vanderjagt kick), 9:23. Tied 7–7. **Drive: 6 plays, 92 yards, 4:04.**
- JAX – Josh Scobee 26-yard field goal, 1:52. Jaguars 10–7. **Drive: 12 plays, 62 yards, 7:31.**
- IND – Danny Clark 17-yard pass from Peyton Manning (Mike Vanderjagt kick), 0:12. Colts 14–10. **Drive: 9 plays, 80 yards, 1:40.**

**Third quarter**

- JAX – Josh Scobee 32-yard field goal, 3:11. Colts 14–13. **Drive: 7 plays, 49 yards, 4:11.**

**Fourth quarter**

- JAX – Josh Scobee 26-yard field goal, 14:52. Jaguars 16–14. **Drive: 6 plays, 20 yards, 3:04.**
- IND – Mike Vanderjagt 34-yard field goal, 9:32. Colts 17–16. **Drive: 5 plays, 68 yards, 3:18.**
- JAX – Jimmy Smith 25-yard pass from Byron Leftwich (pass succeeded), 6:14. Jaguars 24–17. **Drive: 5 plays, 68 yards, 3:18.**
- IND – Marvin Harrison 39-yard pass from Peyton Manning (Mike Vanderjagt kick), 3:52. Tied 24–24. **Drive: 6 plays, 82 yards, 2:22.**
- JAX – Josh Scobee 53-yard field goal, 0:38. Jaguars 27–24. **Drive: 9 plays, 30 yards, 3:14.**

Top passers

- JAX – Byron Leftwich – 23/30, 300 yards, 2 TD, INT
- IND – Peyton Manning – 27/40, 368 yards, 3 TD

Top rushers

- JAX – Fred Taylor – 20 rushes, 107 yards
- IND – Edgerrin James – 18 rushes, 87 yards

Top receivers

- JAX – Jimmy Smith – 5 receptions, 113 yards, TD
- IND – Brandon Stokley – 7 receptions, 112 yards

A fumble by Colts tight end Dallas Clark allowed the Jaguars to capitalize with a field goal, giving them a 16–14 lead as the fourth quarter began. In response, Manning led the Colts down the field to score a field goal, reclaiming the lead. On the subsequent drive, Leftwich connected with Jimmy Smith for a 25–yard touchdown and then successfully targeted wide receiver Ernest Wilford for a two–point conversion. The Colts quickly answered back, with Manning finding Marvin Harrison for a 39–yard touchdown that leveled the score. During the Jaguars next possession, Leftwich completed two passes of over ten yards, advancing into Indianapolis territory. On a 3rd–and–7, Leftwich located Wilford, which positioned the Jaguars within field goal range. KickerJosh Scobee then successfully converted a 53–yard field goal, allowing the Jaguars to take the lead with under a minute left in the game. With no timeouts left, the Colts were unable to mount a comeback, resulting in a 27–24 victory for the Jaguars, marking their first win in Indianapolis. This win propelled them to the top of the AFC South standings. This would ultimately be the Colts' sole defeat in the RCA Dome during the 2004 season.

==== Week 8: at Houston Texans ====
Week Eight: Jacksonville Jaguars at Houston Texans – Game summary

Quarter	1	2	3	4	Total
Jaguars	0	3	0	3	**6**
**Texans**	7	3	0	10	**20**

at Reliant Stadium, Houston, Texas

- Date: October 31, 2004
- Game time: 12:00 p.m. CST
- Game weather: 85 °F (29 °C)
- Game attendance: 70,502
- Referee: Bill Leavy
- TV: CBS
- Recap, Game Book

Game information

**First quarter**

- HOU – Corey Bradford 15-yard pass from David Carr (Kris Brown kick), 3:20. Texans 7–0. **Drive: 8 plays, 40 yards, 4:50.**

**Second quarter**

- JAX – Josh Scobee 44-yard field goal, 6:33. Texans 7–3. **Drive: 12 plays, 54 yards, 5:37.**
- HOU – Kris Brown 38-yard field goal, 0:00. Texans 10–3. **Drive: 3 plays, 50 yards, 0:15.**

**Third quarter**

- No scoring plays

**Fourth quarter**

- HOU – Kris Brown 21-yard field goal, 6:45. Texans 13–3. **Drive: 12 plays, 54 yards, 5:27.**
- JAX – Josh Scobee 36-yard field goal, 3:52. Texans 13–6. **Drive: 10 plays, 65 yards, 2:45.**
- HOU – Demarcus Faggins 43-yard interception return (Kris Brown kick), 0:42. Texans 20–6.

**Top passers**

- JAX – Byron Leftwich – 25/40, 227 yards, 2 INT
- HOU – David Carr – 26/34, 276 yards, TD

**Top rushers**

- JAX – LaBrandon Toefield – 5 rushes, 22 yards
- HOU – Domanick Williams – 22 rushes, 56 yards

**Top receivers**

- JAX – Jimmy Smith – 9 receptions, 117 yards
- HOU – Jabar Gaffney – 5 receptions, 88 yards

==== Week 10: vs. Detroit Lions ====
Week Ten: Detroit Lions at Jacksonville Jaguars – Game summary

Quarter	1	2	3	4	OT	Total
Lions	0	0	0	17	0	**17**
**Jaguars**	7	3	7	0	6	**23**

at Alltel Stadium, Jacksonville, Florida

- Date: November 14, 2004
- Game time: 1:00 p.m. EST
- Game weather: Gusts, 60 °F (16 °C)
- Game attendance: 66,431
- Referee: Scott Green
- Recap, Game Book

Game information

**First quarter**

- JAX – LaBrandon Toefield 12-yard pass from David Garrard (Josh Scobee kick), 8:18. Jaguars 7–0. **Drive: 7 plays, 72 yards, 4:00.**

**Second quarter**

- JAX – Josh Scobee 31-yard field goal, 0:00. Jaguars 10–0. **Drive: 14 plays, 65 yards, 3:40.**

**Third quarter**

- JAX – Greg Jones 1-yard run (Josh Scobee kick), 5:49. Jaguars 17–0. **Drive: 15 plays, 80 yards, 9:11.**

**Fourth quarter**

- DET – Eddie Drummond 55-yard punt return (Jason Hanson kick), 13:07. Lions 17–7.
- DET – Jason Hanson 21-yard field goal, 6:30. Jaguars 17–10. **Drive: 6 plays, 64 yards, 2:16.**
- DET – Eddie Drummond 83-yard punt return (Jason Hanson kick), 0:46. Tied 17–17.

**Overtime**

- JAX – Jimmy Smith 36-yard pass from David Garrard, 9:32. Jaguars 23–17. **Drive: 11 plays, 76 yards, 5:28.**

**Top passers**

- DET – Joey Harrington – 11/33, 121 yards, INT
- JAX – David Garrard – 19/36, 198 yards, 2 TD

**Top rushers**

- DET – Kevin Jones – 19 rushes, 81 yards
- JAX – Fred Taylor – 23 rushes, 144 yards

**Top receivers**

- DET – Roy Williams – 2 receptions, 64 yards
- JAX – Jimmy Smith – 7 receptions, 109 yards, TD

==== Week 11: vs. Tennessee Titans ====
Week Eleven: Tennessee Titans at Jacksonville Jaguars – Game summary

Quarter	1	2	3	4	Total
**Titans**	3	7	0	8	**18**
Jaguars	0	6	7	2	**15**

at Alltel Stadium, Jacksonville, Florida

- Date: November 21, 2004
- Game time: 1:00 p.m. EST
- Game weather: 80 °F (27 °C)
- Game attendance: 69,703
- Referee: Gerry Austin
- Recap, Game Book

Game information

**First quarter**

- TEN – Gary Anderson 41-yard field goal, 0:59. Titans 3–0. **Drive: 6 plays, 13 yards, 2:46.**

**Second quarter**

- JAX – Josh Scobee 35-yard field goal, 10:14. Tied 3–3. **Drive: 14 plays, 72 yards, 5:44.**
- TEN – Derrick Mason 37-yard pass from Steve McNair (Gary Anderson kick), 6:48. Titans 10–3. **Drive: 6 plays, 80 yards, 3:26.**
- JAX – Josh Scobee 48-yard field goal, 1:06. Titans 10–6. **Drive: 9 plays, 35 yards, 5:42.**

**Third quarter**

- JAX – David Garrard 5-yard run (Josh Scobee kick), 1:02. Jaguars 13–10. **Drive: 10 plays, 64 yards, 5:00.**

**Fourth quarter**

- JAX – Steve McNair sacked in end zone by Greg Favors for a safety, 9:12. Jaguars 15–10.
- TEN – Antowain Smith 2-yard run (run succeeded), 3:31. Titans 17–15. **Drive:6 plays, 59 yards, 0:37.**

Top passers

- TEN – Steve McNair – 18/30, 209 yards, TD, 2 INT
- JAX – David Garrard – 13/27, 129 yards, INT

Top rushers

- TEN – Antowain Smith – 24 rushes, 95 yards, TD
- JAX – Fred Taylor – 21 rushes, 103 yards

Top receivers

- TEN – Drew Bennett – 4 receptions, 64 yards
- JAX – Jimmy Smith – 2 receptions, 29 yards

==== Week 12: at Minnesota Vikings ====
Week Twelve: Jacksonville Jaguars at Minnesota Vikings – Game summary

Quarter	1	2	3	4	Total
Jaguars	0	13	0	3	**16**
**Vikings**	3	10	7	7	**27**

at Hubert H. Humphrey Metrodome, Minneapolis, Minnesota

- Date: November 28, 2004
- Game time: 12:00 p.m. CST
- Game weather: None (indoor stadium)
- Game attendance: 64,004
- Referee: Bill Carollo
- Recap, Game Book

Game information

**First quarter**

- MIN – Morten Andersen 25-yard field goal, 6:32. Vikings 3–0. **Drive: 10 plays, 73 yards, 3:56.**

**Second quarter**

- JAX – Brian Jones 26-yard pass from Byron Leftwich (Josh Scobee kick), 13:39. Jaguars 7–3. **Drive: 5 plays, 60 yards, 2:38.**
- JAX – Josh Scobee 33-yard field goal, 11:23. Jaguars 10–3. **Drive: 4 plays, 5 yards, 2:03.**
- MIN – Daunte Culpepper 1-yard run (Morten Andersen kick), 6:15. Tied 10–10. **Drive: 9 plays, 80 yards, 5:08.**
- JAX – Josh Scobee 32-yard field goal, 1:09. Jaguars 13–10. **Drive: 10 plays, 46 yards, 5:06.**
- MIN – Morten Andersen 33-yard field goal, 0:00. Tied 13–13. **Drive: 7 plays, 65 yards, 1:09.**

**Third quarter**

- MIN – Randy Moss 2-yard pass from Daunte Culpepper (Morten Andersen kick), 5:34. Vikings 20–13. **Drive: 16 plays, 80 yards, 9:26.**

**Fourth quarter**

- JAX – Josh Scobee 42-yard field goal, 13:28. Vikings 20–16. **Drive: 8 plays, 48 yards, 3:56.**
- MIN – Kevin Williams 77-yard fumble return (Morten Andersen kick), 1:59. Vikings 27–16.

**Top passers**

- JAX – Byron Leftwich – 19/34, 235 yards, TD
- MIN – Daunte Culpepper – 19/27, 235 yards, TD, INT

**Top rushers**

- JAX – Fred Taylor – 22 rushes, 147 yards
- MIN – Onterrio Smith – 20 rushes, 72 yards

**Top receivers**

- JAX – Jimmy Smith – 4 receptions, 68 yards
- MIN – Jermaine Wiggins – 4 receptions, 55 yards

==== Week 13: vs. Pittsburgh Steelers ====
Week Thirteen: Pittsburgh Steelers at Jacksonville Jaguars – Game summary

Quarter	1	2	3	4	Total
**Steelers**	7	7	0	3	**17**
Jaguars	7	0	6	3	**16**

at Alltel Stadium, Jacksonville, Florida

- Date: December 5, 2004
- Game time: 8:30 p.m. EST
- Game weather: 56 °F (13 °C)
- Game attendance: 76,877
- Referee: Bill Vonovich
- TV announcers (ESPN): Mike Patrick, Joe Theismann, Paul Maguire, and Suzy Kolber
- Recap, Game Book

Game information

**First quarter**

- PIT – Hines Ward 37-yard pass from Ben Roethlisberger (Jeff Reed kick), 9:45. Steelers 7–0. **Drive: 7 plays, 77 yards, 3:45.**
- JAX – Troy Edwards 22-yard pass from Byron Leftwich (Josh Scobee kick), 2:03. Tied 7–7. **Drive: 12 plays, 73 yards, 7:42.**

**Second quarter**

- PIT – Jay Riemersma 26-yard pass from Ben Roethlisberger (Jeff Reed kick), 11:47. Steelers 14–7. **Drive: 10 plays, 72 yards, 5:16.**

**Third quarter**

- JAX – Josh Scobee 20-yard field goal, 8:47. Steelers 14–10. **Drive: 9 plays, 96 yards, 3:00.**
- JAX – Josh Scobee 29-yard field goal, 0:08. Steelers 14–13. **Drive: 12 plays, 55 yards, 7:09.**

**Fourth quarter**

- JAX – Josh Scobee 36-yard field goal, 1:55. Jaguars 16–14. **Drive: 12 plays, 62 yards, 4:49.**
- PIT – Jeff Reed 37-yard field goal, 0:18. Steelers 17–16. **Drive: 6 plays, 56 yards, 1:37.**

Top passers

- PIT – Ben Roethlisberger – 14/17, 221 yards, 2 TD
- JAX – Byron Leftwich – 16/27, 268 yards, TD

Top rushers

- PIT – Duce Staley – 17 rushes, 51 yards
- JAX – Fred Taylor – 27 rushes, 76 yards

Top receivers

- PIT – Hines Ward – 4 receptions, 80 yards, TD
- JAX – Troy Edwards – 5 receptions, 90 yards, TD

==== Week 14: vs. Chicago Bears ====
Week Fourteen: Chicago Bears at Jacksonville Jaguars – Game summary

Quarter	1	2	3	4	Total
Bears	0	3	0	0	**3**
**Jaguars**	7	3	3	9	**22**

at Alltel Stadium, Jacksonville, Florida

- Date: December 12, 2004
- Game time: 1:00 p.m. EST
- Game weather: Sunshine, 53 °F (12 °C)
- Game attendance: 67,572
- Referee: Bernie Kukar
- Recap, Game Book

Game information

**First quarter**

- JAX – Reggie Williams 6-yard pass from Byron Leftwich (Josh Scobee kick), 3:18. Jaguars 7–0. **Drive: 11 plays, 73 yards, 4:49.**

**Second quarter**

- CHI – Paul Edinger 42-yard field goal, 1:44. Jaguars 7–3. **Drive: 5 plays, 26 yards, 2:06.**
- JAX – Josh Scobee 30-yard field goal, 0:31. Jaguars 10–3. **Drive: 8 plays, 56 yards, 1:13.**

**Third quarter**

- JAX – Josh Scobee 25-yard field goal, 5:36. Jaguars 13–3. **Drive: 7 plays, 37 yards, 4:16.**

**Fourth quarter**

- JAX – Chad Hutchinson sacked in end zone by Daryl Smith for a safety, 13:48. Jaguars 15–3.
- JAX – Jimmy Smith 31-yard pass from Byron Leftwich (Josh Scobee kick), 9:26. Jaguars 22–3. **Drive: 7 plays, 61 yards, 4:22.**

Top passers

- CHI – Chad Hutchinson – 17/33, 212 yards, INT
- JAX – Byron Leftwich – 25/45, 242 yards, 2 TD, INT

Top rushers

- CHI – Thomas Jones – 13 rushes, 26 yards
- JAX – Fred Taylor – 21 rushes, 79 yards

Top receivers

- CHI – Thomas Jones – 3 receptions, 68 yards
- JAX – Jimmy Smith – 6 receptions, 85 yards, TD

==== Week 15: at Green Bay Packers ====
Week Fifteen: Jacksonville Jaguars at Green Bay Packers – Game summary

Quarter	1	2	3	4	Total
**Jaguars**	7	7	7	7	**28**
Packers	0	10	7	8	**25**

at Lambeau Field, Green Bay, Wisconsin

- Date: December 19, 2004
- Game time: 3:15 p.m. CST
- Game weather: Clear, 12 °F (−11 °C)
- Game attendance: 70,437
- Referee: Bill Carollo
- TV announcers (CBS): Dick Enberg, Dan Dierdorf, and Armen Keteyian
- Recap, Game Book

Game information

**First quarter**

- JAX – Jimmy Smith 31-yard pass from Byron Leftwich (Josh Scobee kick), 12:56. Jaguars 7–0. **Drive: 3 plays, 68 yards, 2:04.**

**Second quarter**

- GB – Ryan Longwell 35-yard field goal, 13:35. Jaguars 7–3. **Drive: 7 plays, 36 yards, 3:06.**
- GB – Darren Sharper 15-yard fumble return (Ryan Longwell kick), 4:44. Packers 10–7.
- JAX – Jimmy Smith 16-yard pass from Byron Leftwich (Josh Scobee kick), 2:28. Jaguars 14–10. **Drive: 4 plays, 68 yards, 2:16.**

**Third quarter**

- GB – Donald Driver 32-yard pass from Brett Favre (Ryan Longwell kick), 11:44. Packers 17–14. **Drive: 6 plays, 76 yards, 3:16.**
- JAX – Fred Taylor 37-yard run (Josh Scobee kick), 10:15. Jaguars 21–17. **Drive: 4 plays, 64 yards, 1:29.**

**Fourth quarter**

- JAX – Greg Jones 1-yard run (Josh Scobee kick), 9:49. Jaguars 28–17. **Drive: 10 plays, 58 yards, 5:51.**
- GB – Antonio Chatman 6-yard pass from Brett Favre (pass succeeded), 1:08. Jaguars 28–25. **Drive: 7 plays, 76 yards, 1:24.**

**Top passers**

- JAX – Byron Leftwich – 9/20, 121 yards, 2 TD
- GB – Brett Favre – 30/44, 367 yards, 2 TD, 3 INT

**Top rushers**

- JAX – Fred Taylor – 22 rushes, 165 yards, TD
- GB – Ahman Green – 17 rushes, 94 yards

**Top receivers**

- JAX – Jimmy Smith – 4 receptions, 87 yards, TD
- GB – Javon Walker – 11 receptions, 152 yards

==== Week 16: vs. Houston Texans ====
Week Sixteen: Houston Texans at Jacksonville Jaguars – Game summary

Quarter	1	2	3	4	Total
**Texans**	7	7	0	7	**21**
Jaguars	0	0	0	0	**0**

at Alltel Stadium, Jacksonville, Florida

- Date: December 26
- Game time: 1:00 p.m. EST
- Game weather: Clear, 40 °F (4 °C)
- Game attendance: 66,227
- Referee: Walt Coleman
- Recap, Game Book

Game information

**First quarter**

- HOU – Domanick Davis 1-yard run (Kris Brown kick), 8:33. Texans 7–0. **Drive: 10 plays, 65 yards, 6:27.**

**Second quarter**

- HOU – Andre Johnson 10-yard pass from David Carr (Kris Brown kick), 6:46. Texans 14–0. **Drive: 5 plays, 71 yards, 2:38.**

**Third quarter**

- No scoring plays.

**Fourth quarter**

- HOU – Antwan Peek 66-yard fumble return (Kris Brown kick), 3:11. Texans 21–0.

**Top passers**

- HOU – David Carr – 13/19, 131 yards, TD, 2 INT
- JAX – Byron Leftwich – 6/14, 35 yards, INT

**Top rushers**

- HOU – Domanick Davis – 31 rushes, 158 yards, TD
- JAX – Greg Jones – 9 rushes, 38 yards

**Top receivers**

- HOU – Andre Johnson – 4 receptions, 46 yards, TD
- JAX – Troy Edwards – 3 receptions, 24 yards

==== Week 17: at Oakland Raiders ====
Week Seventeen: Jacksonville Jaguars at Oakland Raiders – Game summary

Quarter	1	2	3	4	Total
**Jaguars**	0	3	10	0	**13**
Raiders	3	3	0	0	**6**

at McAfee Coliseum, Oakland, California

- Date: January 2, 2005
- Game time: 1:15 p.m. PST
- Game weather: Light rain, 48 °F (9 °C)
- Game attendance: 41,112
- Referee: Tony Corrente
- Recap, Game Book

Game information

**First quarter**

- OAK – Sebastian Janikowski 35-yard field goal, 9:27. Raiders 3–0. **Drive: 12 plays, 67 yards, 5:33.**

**Second quarter**

- JAX – Josh Scobee 26-yard field goal, 10:15. Tied 3–3. **Drive: 17 plays, 67 yards, 8:09.**
- OAK – Sebastian Janikowski 27-yard field goal, 0:02. Raiders 6–3. **Drive: 3 plays, 15 yards, 0:16.**

**Third quarter**

- JAX – Josh Scobee 22-yard field goal, 7:10. Tied 6–6. **Drive: 5 plays, 17 yards, 2:06.**
- JAX – Greg Jones 1-yard run (Josh Scobee kick), 3:41. Jaguars 13–6. **Drive: 6 plays, 53 yards, 2:21.**

**Fourth quarter**

- No scoring plays.

**Top passers**

- JAX – Byron Leftwich – 15/28, 149 yards, INT
- OAK – Kerry Collins – 15/39, 142 yards, 3 INT

**Top rushers**

- JAX – Byron Leftwich – 10 rushes, 41 yards
- OAK – Zack Crockett – 21 rushes, 134 yards

**Top receivers**

- JAX – Ernest Wilford – 2 receptions, 56 yards
- OAK – Jerry Porter – 3 receptions, 35 yards

=== Standings ===
==== Division ====
AFC South
	W	L	T	PCT	DIV	CONF	PF	PA	STK
^{(3)} Indianapolis Colts	12	4	0	.750	5–1	8–4	522	351	L1
Jacksonville Jaguars	9	7	0	.563	2–4	6–6	261	280	W1
Houston Texans	7	9	0	.438	4–2	6–6	309	339	L1
Tennessee Titans	5	11	0	.313	1–5	3–9	344	439	W1

==== Conference ====
AFC
#	Team	Division	W	L	T	PCT	DIV	CONF	SOS	SOV	STK
**Division leaders**
1	Pittsburgh Steelers	North	15	1	0	.938	5–1	11–1	.484	.479	W14
2	New England Patriots	East	14	2	0	.875	5–1	10–2	.492	.478	W2
3 (Note: Indianapolis clinched the AFC #3 seed instead of San Diego based upon head-to-head victory.)	Indianapolis Colts	South	12	4	0	.750	5–1	8–4	.500	.458	L1
4	San Diego Chargers	West	12	4	0	.750	5–1	9–3	.477	.411	W1
**Wild cards**
5 (Note: New York Jets clinched the AFC #5 seed instead of Denver based upon better record against common opponents (New York Jets were 5–0 to Denver’s 3–2 against San Diego, Cincinnati, Houston, and Miami).)	New York Jets	East	10	6	0	.625	3–3	7–5	.523	.406	L2
6	Denver Broncos	West	10	6	0	.625	3–3	7–5	.484	.450	W2
**Did not qualify for the postseason**
7 (Note: Jacksonville and Baltimore finished ahead of Buffalo because they each defeated Buffalo head-to-head.) (Note: Jacksonville finished ahead of Baltimore based upon better record against common opponents (Jacksonville were 3–2 against Baltimore’s 2–3 versus Pittsburgh, Indianapolis, Buffalo and Kansas City).)	Jacksonville Jaguars	South	9	7	0	.563	2–4	6–6	.527	.479	W1
8	Baltimore Ravens	North	9	7	0	.563	3–3	6–6	.551	.472	W1
9	Buffalo Bills	East	9	7	0	.563	3–3	5–7	.512	.382	L1
10	Cincinnati Bengals	North	8	8	0	.500	2–4	4–8	.543	.453	W2
11 (Note: Houston finished ahead of Kansas City based upon head-to-head victory.)	Houston Texans	South	7	9	0	.438	4–2	6–6	.504	.402	L1
12	Kansas City Chiefs	West	7	9	0	.438	3–3	6–6	.551	.509	L1
13 (Note: Oakland finished ahead of Tennessee based upon head-to-head victory.)	Oakland Raiders	West	5	11	0	.313	1–5	3–9	.570	.450	L2
14	Tennessee Titans	South	5	11	0	.313	1–5	3–9	.512	.463	W1
15 (Note: Miami finished ahead of Cleveland based upon head-to-head victory.)	Miami Dolphins	East	4	12	0	.250	1–5	2–10	.555	.438	L1
16	Cleveland Browns	North	4	12	0	.250	1–5	3–9	.590	.469	W1
**Tiebreakers** (Note: When breaking ties for three or more teams under the NFL's rules, they are first broken within divisions, then comparing only the highest-ranked remaining team from each division.)
