= Donté Curry =

American football player (born 1978)

No. 57, 55, 96
- Position: Linebacker

Personal information
- Born: July 22, 1978 (age 48); Savannah, Georgia, U.S.
- Listed height: 6 ft 1 in (1.85 m)
- Listed weight: 240 lb (109 kg)

Career information
- High school: Savannah
- College: Morris Brown
- NFL draft: 2001: undrafted

Career history
- Green Bay Packers (2001)*; Washington Redskins (2001); Detroit Lions (2002–2007); Carolina Panthers (2007–2008)
- * Offseason or practice squad member only

Career NFL statistics
- Total tackles: 183
- Sacks: 3
- Forced fumbles: 5
- Fumble recoveries: 4
- Stats at Pro Football Reference

Donté Lamont Curry (born July 22, 1978) is an American former professional football player who was a linebacker in the National Football League (NFL). He was signed by the Green Bay Packers as an undrafted free agent in 2001. He played college football for the Morris Brown Wolverines.

Curry played for the Carolina Panthers, Washington Redskins, and the Detroit Lions.

== Early life ==
Curry attended Savannah High School in Savannah, Georgia. In football, he was a three-year letterman and as a senior, he won All-State honors as a defensive end.

== College career ==
Curry played college football at Morris Brown College, where he played in 21 games recording 171 tackles and 26 sacks. He majored in therapeutic recreation.

== Professional career ==
=== Washington Redskins ===
Curry was signed by the Washington Redskins as a free agent on October 3, 2001. In his rookie season he played in eight games and recorded four tackles.

=== Detroit Lions ===
Curry was claimed off waivers by the Detroit Lions on August 28, 2002. In his first season with the Lions, he played in all 16 games making ten starts and finished the season with a career high 66 tackles and three sacks. In the 2003 season, he played in 11 games and was inactive for five, he recorded nine tackles. The following season he recorded 22 tackles. In the 2005 season Curry had a solid season finishing the campaign with 38 tackles. The following season, he was elected special teams captain for the third year running. He recorded 18 tackles. In 2007, his final year for the Lions, he played in two games making three tackles.

=== Carolina Panthers ===
Curry was signed by the Carolina Panthers as a free agent September 24, 2007 and played in seven games making seven tackles. In the 2008 season he played in 13 games recording 13 tackles.

== NFL career statistics ==
Legend
| **Bold** | Career high |

=== Regular season ===
| Year | Team | Games | | Tackles | | | | | Interceptions | | | | | Fumbles | | | |
| Year | Team | GP | GS | Cmb | Solo | Ast | Sck | TFL | Int | Yds | TD | Lng | PD | FF | FR | Yds | TD |
|---|---|---|---|---|---|---|---|---|---|---|---|---|---|---|---|---|---|
| 2001 | WAS | 8 | 0 | 4 | 3 | 1 | 0.0 | 0 | 0 | 0 | 0 | 0 | 0 | 0 | 0 | 0 | 0 |
| 2002 | DET | **16** | **10** | **68** | **51** | **17** | **3.0** | 0 | 0 | 0 | 0 | 0 | 0 | **4** | **1** | 0 | 0 |
| 2003 | DET | 11 | 0 | 9 | 8 | 1 | 0.0 | 0 | 0 | 0 | 0 | 0 | 0 | 0 | **1** | 0 | 0 |
| 2004 | DET | 12 | 0 | 23 | 21 | 2 | 0.0 | 0 | 0 | 0 | 0 | 0 | 0 | 1 | **1** | 0 | 0 |
| 2005 | DET | 13 | 2 | 38 | 28 | 10 | 0.0 | **1** | 0 | 0 | 0 | 0 | 0 | 0 | 0 | 0 | 0 |
| 2006 | DET | **16** | 0 | 18 | 14 | 4 | 0.0 | 0 | 0 | 0 | 0 | 0 | 0 | 0 | **1** | 0 | 0 |
| 2007 | DET | 2 | 0 | 3 | 3 | 0 | 0.0 | 0 | 0 | 0 | 0 | 0 | 0 | 0 | 0 | 0 | 0 |
| 2007 | CAR | 7 | 0 | 7 | 5 | 2 | 0.0 | 0 | 0 | 0 | 0 | 0 | 0 | 0 | 0 | 0 | 0 |
| 2008 | CAR | 13 | 0 | 13 | 11 | 2 | 0.0 | 0 | 0 | 0 | 0 | 0 | 0 | 0 | 0 | 0 | 0 |
| | | 98 | 12 | 183 | 144 | 39 | 3.0 | 1 | 0 | 0 | 0 | 0 | 0 | 5 | 4 | 0 | 0 |

=== Playoffs ===
| Year | Team | Games | | Tackles | | | | | Interceptions | | | | | Fumbles | | | |
| Year | Team | GP | GS | Cmb | Solo | Ast | Sck | TFL | Int | Yds | TD | Lng | PD | FF | FR | Yds | TD |
|---|---|---|---|---|---|---|---|---|---|---|---|---|---|---|---|---|---|
| 2008 | CAR | **1** | 0 | 0 | 0 | 0 | 0.0 | 0 | 0 | 0 | 0 | 0 | 0 | 0 | 0 | 0 | 0 |
| | | 1 | 0 | 0 | 0 | 0 | 0.0 | 0 | 0 | 0 | 0 | 0 | 0 | 0 | 0 | 0 | 0 |

== Coaching career ==
Curry began coaching high school football at Langston Hughes High School near Fairburn, Georgia in 2009. He now coaches at Lovejoy High School in Clayton County.
