= Kelly Butler =

American football player (born 1982)

No. 68, 71, 79
- Position: Offensive tackle

Personal information
- Born: June 24, 1982 (age 44); Grand Rapids, Michigan, U.S.
- Listed height: 6 ft 8 in (2.03 m)
- Listed weight: 317 lb (144 kg)

Career information
- High school: Union (Grand Rapids)
- College: Purdue
- NFL draft: 2004: 6th round, 172nd overall pick

Career history
- Detroit Lions (2004–2006); Cleveland Browns (2006–2007); Oklahoma City Yard Dawgz (2008); Arizona Cardinals (2008)*; Oklahoma City Yard Dawgz (2009); Winnipeg Blue Bombers (2010–2011)
- * Offseason or practice squad member only

Awards and highlights
- Sporting News Freshman All-Big Ten (2001)

Career NFL statistics
- Games played: 22
- Games started: 21
- Stats at Pro Football Reference

Career AFL statistics
- Receptions: 1
- Receiving yards: 10
- Touchdowns: 1
- Stats at ArenaFan.com
- Stats at CFL.ca (archive)

Kelly Don Butler (born July 24, 1982) is an American former professional football player who was an offensive tackle in the National Football League (NFL) and Canadian Football League (CFL). He was selected by the Detroit Lions in the sixth round of the 2004 NFL draft. He played college football for the Purdue Boilermakers.

Butler was also a member of the Cleveland Browns, Arizona Cardinals, Oklahoma City Yard Dawgz and Winnipeg Blue Bombers. Outside of his involvement with the Blue Bombers, Butler often appears on Winnipeg based radio station CITI-FM, as a guest co-host of Wheeler in the Morning.

== Early life ==
Butler attended Union High School, where he played football as well as basketball. He was a two-time All-City and All-Arena selection as a member of the school's football team. He was named an All-American, All-State and All-Regional selection as a senior, as well as a member of the city championship winning team. He was ranked as the #24 offensive lineman and #209 player overall in the nation by Prep Football Report.

== College career ==
Butler then attended Purdue University, where he majored in Law and Society. As a true freshman in 2000, he received medical redshirt after suffering from shoulder tendinitis. In 2001, he received the team's Newcomer Award for Offense for the spring season. He was named to The Sporting News Big Ten All-Freshman team. He started all 12 games at Right Tackle. As a sophomore in 2002, he started all 13 games at Right Tackle. He graded out at 80% or better in five games, 81% against Minnesota and on the road against Iowa. He had a season-high grade of 83% against Indiana. He also helped Purdue lead Big Ten in total offense with 452.2 yards per game. In 2003 he started every game at Right Tackle and graded at least 80% or better for blocking consistency in every game. He recorded 78 knockdowns, with nine of those blocks resulting in touchdowns. He helped the offense average 372.9 yards per game. He ended his career with 10 knockdowns against Georgia in the Capital One Citrus Bowl as he did not allow defensive end Robert Geathers to record any tackles.

== Professional career ==
=== Pre-draft ===
Butler was invited, and attended the 2004 NFL Scouting Combine.

Pre-draft measurables
Height	Weight	Arm length	Hand span	40-yard dash	10-yard split	20-yard split	20-yard shuttle	Three-cone drill	Vertical jump	Broad jump	Bench press
6 ft 7 3/8 in (2.02 m)	320 lb (145 kg)	33 3/4 in (0.86 m)	9 7/8 in (0.25 m)	5.11 s	1.77 s	2.96 s	4.92 s	7.96 s	30 1/2 in (0.77 m)	8 ft 9 in (2.67 m)	19 reps
Arm and hand spans and bench press from Pro Day, all other values from NFL Combine.

=== Detroit Lions ===
Butler was selected in the sixth round (172nd overall) of the 2004 NFL draft by the Detroit Lions.

Butler played two seasons for the Lions, playing in just 16 regular season games during those two seasons. As a rookie in 2004 he was inactive for all but one game of the season. He was active for the Lions' season finale game against the Tennessee Titans, however he did not play in the game. The following year, he earned the starting role at Right Tackle, and made his NFL debut against the Green Bay Packers, he then started every game of the regular season, recording a recovered fumble to help continue a third quarter scoring drive against the Pittsburgh Steelers. However, his career in Detroit ended when he was waived by the Lions at the end of training camp the next season.

=== Cleveland Browns ===
Butler was claimed off of waivers by the Cleveland Browns on September 3, 2006. He began the season as the backup to starter Ryan Tucker. Butler appeared in seven games, including five starts at Right Tackle. He made his Browns debut, a start in place of an ill Tucker, against the New York Jets on October 29. He started his second game the next week against the San Diego Chargers. He then replaced Tucker (illness) as the starting Right Tackle between November 26 through December 17, he was however played on Injured Reserve on December 20 with an injured foot. However, on October 6, 2007, he was waived by the Browns, after Tucker returned from a league suspension.

=== Oklahoma City Yard Dawgz ===
In 2008, Butler joined af2, and on May 16, he was assigned to the Oklahoma City Yard Dawgz. As a rookie in af2, he played in just seven games, with one start. For the season, he recorded one reception for four yards, against the Iowa Barnstormers. His lone start of the season came against the Boise Burn. On August 2, he was placed on the Other league exempt list by the Yard Dawgz, after he was invited to training camp with the Arizona Cardinals.

=== Arizona Cardinals ===
On July 24, 2008, Butler signed with the Arizona Cardinals. However, on August 30, he, along with 21 others were released by the Cardinals final cuts of training camp.

=== Winnipeg Blue Bombers ===
On March 19, 2010, it was announced that Butler had signed with the Winnipeg Blue Bombers. After two seasons with the Blue Bombers, he announced his retirement on March 12, 2012.
