= Greg Jones (fullback) =

American football player (born 1981)

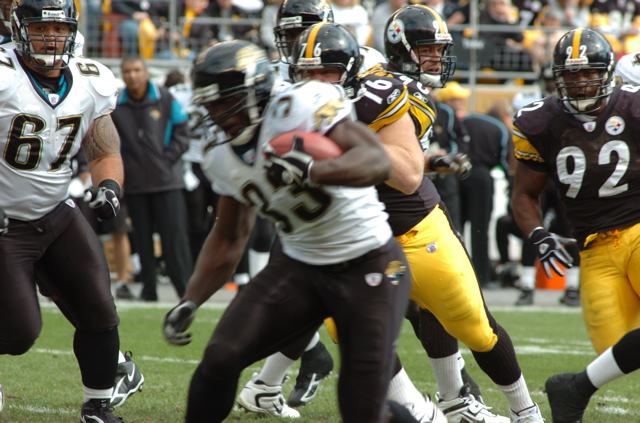
- Jones with the Jacksonville Jaguars in 2005

No. 33
- Position: Fullback

Personal information
- Born: May 9, 1981 (age 45); Columbia, South Carolina, U.S.
- Listed height: 6 ft 1 in (1.85 m)
- Listed weight: 251 lb (114 kg)

Career information
- High school: Battery Creek (Beaufort, South Carolina)
- College: Florida State (2000–2003)
- NFL draft: 2004: 2nd round, 55th overall pick

Career history
- Jacksonville Jaguars (2004–2012); Houston Texans (2013); New Orleans Saints (2014)*
- * Offseason or practice squad member only

Awards and highlights
- Second-team All-ACC (2002)

Career NFL statistics
- Rushing attempts: 272
- Rushing yards: 913
- Rushing touchdowns: 10
- Receptions: 73
- Receiving yards: 471
- Receiving touchdowns: 3
- Stats at Pro Football Reference

Gregory B. Jones Sr. (born May 9, 1981) is an American former professional football player who was a fullback in the National Football League (NFL). He played college football for the Florida State Seminoles and was selected by the Jacksonville Jaguars in the second round of the 2004 NFL draft. He also played for the Houston Texans.

== Early life ==
Jones attended Battery Creek High School in Beaufort, South Carolina, where he earned all-state honors on offense and defense, and also ran track and field, recording a personal best of 10.7 seconds in the 100 meters.

== College career ==
Initially recruited as an All-State Linebacker, he played for Florida State as a running back. As a freshman, Jones scored his first collegiate touchdown as a Seminole in the season opener versus North Carolina. Despite having a strong season it would end early; tore the ACL in is left knee finishing the season playing in seven games, and missing the last five.

== Professional career ==
=== Jacksonville Jaguars ===
The Jaguars selected Jones in the second round of the 2004 NFL draft. In Jacksonville, he mostly saw action as fullback, filling in at tailback and as a substitute for Fred Taylor.

In his rookie season, Jones carried 62 times for 162 yards and three touchdowns. In his second season with the Jaguars, Jones rushed for 651 yards and four touchdowns on 171 carries.

Due to an injury to his ACL suffered against the Tampa Bay Buccaneers during preseason on August 26, 2006, Jones did not play football during the 2006 NFL season.

During the 2007 NFL season Jones carried the ball 92 times for 319 yards and five touchdowns. He also added 99 yards and two touchdowns on 11 catches and he was the first alternate on AFC Pro Bowl roster at fullback. He was scheduled to become a free agent but on February 13, 2008, the Jaguars signed him to a new deal. The deal was worth $17.4 million over 5 years, including up to $3 million in incentives. The deal made Jones the highest-paid fullback in NFL history.

Jones was placed on season-ending injured reserve with an ankle injury on December 10, 2008. He finished the 2008 season with 62 carries for 213 yards and two touchdowns as well as 33 receptions for 316 yard and three touchdowns in 12 games.

On December 17, 2009, Jones was placed on injured reserve due to an ankle injury and missed the rest of the season.

Jones was the fullback when the Jaguars' All-Pro running back Maurice Jones-Drew led the league in rushing yards in 2011.

=== Houston Texans ===
Jones was signed by the Houston Texans on March 27, 2013.

=== New Orleans Saints ===
Jones signed with the New Orleans Saints on August 6, 2014.

He was notified of his release on August 29, 2014, as part of the team's roster cutdown.

=== Retirement ===
On January 14, 2015, he announced his retirement as a member of the Jaguars. He officially retired while under a one-day contract to the Jacksonville Jaguars on January 15, 2015.

=== NFL statistics ===
Rushing

Year	Team	Games	Carries	Yards	Yards per carry	Longest carry	Touchdowns	First downs	Fumbles	Fumbles lost
2004	JAX	16	62	162	2.6	12	3	14	1	0
2005	JAX	14	151	575	3.8	27	4	32	0	0
2007	JAX	16	42	119	2.8	11	2	7	0	0
2008	JAX	12	2	13	6.5	13	0	1	0	0
2009	JAX	13	4	23	5.8	11	0	1	0	0
2010	JAX	16	2	4	2.0	3	0	0	0	0
2011	JAX	16	2	7	3.5	6	1	1	0	0
2012	JAX	12	5	8	1.6	4	0	3	0	0
2013	HOU	16	2	2	1.0	4	0	0	0	0
Career		131	272	913	3.4	27	10	59	1	0

Receiving

Year	Team	Games	Receptions	Targets	Yards	Yards per reception	Longest reception	Touchdowns	First downs
2004	JAX	16	3	—	13	4.3	9	0	1
2005	JAX	14	10	—	65	6.5	10	0	3
2007	JAX	16	11	19	99	9.0	27	2	8
2008	JAX	12	13	15	116	8.9	22	1	6
2009	JAX	13	5	11	14	2.8	9	0	0
2010	JAX	16	11	11	47	4.3	12	0	2
2011	JAX	16	4	9	19	4.8	10	0	2
2012	JAX	12	11	13	64	5.8	10	0	1
2013	HOU	16	5	11	34	6.8	19	0	1
Career		131	73	89	471	6.5	27	3	24

Returning

Year	Team	Games	Punt return attempts	Punt return yards	Punts return touchdowns	Fair catches	Longest punt return	Kickoff return attempts	Kickoff return yards	Kickoff return touchdowns	Longest kickoff return
2004	JAX	16	0	0	0	0	0	5	90	0	23
2005	JAX	14	0	0	0	0	0	1	0	0	0
2008	JAX	12	0	0	0	0	0	2	19	0	10
2013	HOU	16	0	0	0	0	0	1	17	0	17
Career		58	0	0	0	0	0	9	126	0	23

== Personal life ==
Jones is a cousin of boxer Joe Frazier.
