= LaBrandon Toefield =

American football player (born 1980)

No. 22
- Position: Running back

Personal information
- Born: September 24, 1980 (age 46); Independence, Louisiana, U.S.
- Listed height: 5 ft 11 in (1.80 m)
- Listed weight: 235 lb (107 kg)

Career information
- High school: Independence (LA)
- College: LSU
- NFL draft: 2003: 4th round, 132nd overall pick

Career history
- Jacksonville Jaguars (2003–2007); Carolina Panthers (2008)*; New York Sentinels (2009)
- * Offseason or practice squad member only

Awards and highlights
- First-team All-SEC (2001)

Career NFL statistics
- Rushing attempts: 163
- Rushing yards: 572
- Rushing touchdowns: 7
- Receptions: 46
- Receiving yards: 277
- Receiving touchdowns: 2
- Stats at Pro Football Reference

LaBrandon Cordell Toefield (born September 24, 1980) is an American former professional football player who was a running back in the National Football League (NFL). He played college football for the LSU Tigers and was selected by the Jacksonville Jaguars in the fourth round of the 2003 NFL draft.

Toefield was also a member of the Carolina Panthers and New York Sentinels.

== Early life ==
Toefield was born and raised in Independence, Louisiana. He attended Independence High School, where he played for the high school football team under head coach Charles Baglio. Toefield excelled as a sophomore rushing for 1,800 yards and 32 touchdowns. As a junior Toefield lead Independence to the 3A state championship game before losing to Evangel Christian Academy. In Toefield's junior season he rushed for 2,800 yards and 45 touchdowns. Due to the Tiger's lack of a passing attack, the coaches overused him, causing him to injure his knee in the spring of that year. His rehabilitation caused him not to play as a senior in high school.

== College career ==
Toefield was a three-year starter at Louisiana State. As a junior named an All-Southeastern Conference first-team selection by league's coaches and Associated Press. Toefield rushed for 2,149 yards with 26 touchdowns on 511 carries, ranking ninth in school history in rushing yards, eighth in rushing scores and sixth in carries. Started 10 games as a freshman, 11 games as a junior and 9 games as a senior. He led all freshman running backs in the SEC with 682 yards on 165 carries with five touchdowns. Toefield majored in general studies.

== Professional career ==
=== Jacksonville Jaguars ===
Toefield was a backup running back for the Jacksonville Jaguars, behind Fred Taylor and usually Maurice Jones-Drew, until 2008.

=== Carolina Panthers ===
On March 7, 2008, he was signed by the Carolina Panthers. He was released during final cuts on August 30 and spent the year out of football.

=== New York Sentinels ===
Toefield was drafted by the New York Sentinels of the United Football League in the UFL premiere season draft. He signed with the team on August 27, 2009.
