= Sean Bubin =

American football player (born 1981)

Profile
- Position: Offensive tackle

Personal information
- Born: January 26, 1981 (age 45); Houston, Texas, U.S.
- Listed height: 6 ft 6 in (1.98 m)
- Listed weight: 306 lb (139 kg)

Career information
- College: Illinois
- NFL draft: 2004: 5 / Pick 159th round

Career history
- 2004: Jacksonville Jaguars*
- 2004: Detroit Lions
- 2005-2006: Minnesota Vikings*
- 2006: Hamburg Sea Devils
- 2006: New England Patriots*
- * Offseason or practice squad member only

Sean Bubin (born January 26, 1981) is an American former professional football offensive tackle of the National Football League (NFL). He was a fifth round pick (159th overall) out of the University of Illinois in 2004 by the Jacksonville Jaguars, Bubin spent time with the Jaguars, Detroit Lions, and Minnesota Vikings. He has also played for the Hamburg Sea Devils of NFL Europe. Bubin retired on April 20, 2007, after spending half the previous season on the practice squad of the New England Patriots.
