= 2007 Jacksonville Jaguars season =

13th season in franchise history

- Owner: Wayne Weaver
- General manager: James "Shack" Harris
- Head coach: Jack Del Rio
- Offensive coordinator: Dirk Koetter
- Defensive coordinator: Mike Smith
- Home stadium: Jacksonville Municipal Stadium

Results
- Record: 11–5
- Division place: 2nd AFC South
- Playoffs: Won Wild Card Playoffs (at Steelers) 31–29; Lost Divisional Playoffs (at Patriots) 20–31
- Pro Bowlers: RB Fred Taylor

Uniform

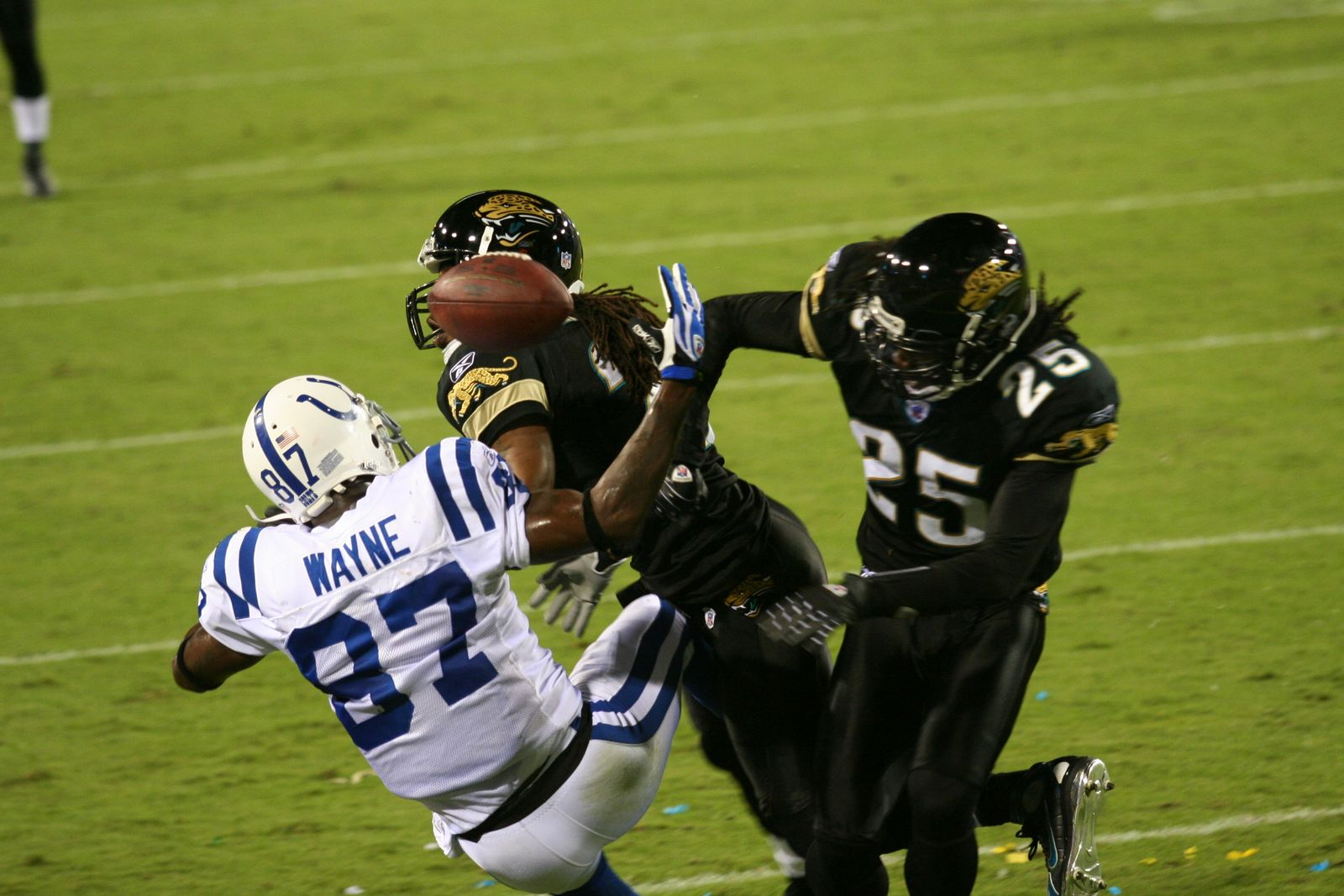
Reggie Nelson hits Indianapolis's Reggie Wayne, October 22, 2007

The 2007 Jacksonville Jaguars season was the franchise's thirteenth season in the National Football League (NFL) and the fifth under head coach Jack Del Rio. They improved upon their 8–8 record from 2006 when they finished third in the AFC South, and returned to the playoffs for the first time since 2005. The Jaguars defeated the Pittsburgh Steelers 31–29 in the Wild Card round but were then defeated by the New England Patriots 31–20 in the Divisional Playoffs.

The franchise would miss the playoffs for the next nine seasons, only returning to the playoffs after winning the AFC South in 2017.

== Offseason ==
=== Coaching staff changes ===
After the 2006 season, the Jaguars announced that offensive coordinator Carl Smith, special teams coordinator Pete Rodriguez, quarterbacks coach Ken Anderson, and wide receivers coach Steve Walters would not be returning. Along with these, special teams assistant Mark Michaels' contract had expired and would not be renewed. When hiring, Del Rio created a new position on the staff, assistant wide receivers coach, and so needed to fill six positions. By early February he completed the staff with Dirk Koetter as offensive coordinator, Mike Shula as quarterbacks coach, Todd Monken as wide receivers coach, Robert Prince as wide receivers assistant, Joe DeCamillis as special teams coordinator, and Tom Williams as special teams assistant. Along with the new staff, assistant head coach Mike Tice will take over coaching of the tight ends.

=== Departures ===
After a number of player arrests from the end of 2006 season, cornerback Ahmad Carroll, who was signed by the Jaguars in October after being waived by the Green Bay Packers and played in only one game with the Jaguars, was arrested in May on weapons and drug charges, prompting the Jaguars to release him. Also, in a move that shocked even the Jaguars players, nine-year veteran strong safety Donovin Darius was released.

On 31 August 2007, Jaguars coach Jack Del Rio announced in a press conference that Byron Leftwich would be traded or released within the next 72 hours, and that David Garrard would take over the starting duties. The specific reasons were not disclosed. Del Rio was quoted as saying that he "felt a conviction in his heart that Garrard was the guy for the job and he's earned it". The Jaguars released 19 players, traded one player, and placed two players on injured reserve to meet the 53 man roster requirements for the beginning of the season. Byron Leftwich, Dan Connolly, Jamaal Fudge, Nick Greisen, Seth Payne, Charles Sharon, Bruce Thornton, Dee Webb, Josh Gattis, Joe Anoa'i, Kevis Coley, Walter Curry, Ryan Gibbons, Tyler King, Jamar Landrom, Roy Manning, Pete McMahon, Rashod Moulton, and Isaac Smolko were released. Alvin Pearman was traded to the Seattle Seahawks for an undisclosed draft choice. James Wyche and Mike Walker were placed on injured reserve for injuries to groin and knee respectively.

=== Signings ===
The off-season brought the arrival of seven free agents to the Jaguars. On offense, offensive tackle Tony Pashos and tight ends Jermaine Wiggins, Richard Angulo and Isaac Smolko were signed. On defense, safety Kevin McCadam and cornerback Bruce Thornton. Additionally, first-year punter Tony Yelk was signed to the special teams.

In addition to the new signings to the team, Tony Gilbert, Derrick Wimbush, Kenny Pettway, Quinn Gray Ernest Wilford and Josh Scobee signed contracts and unrestricted free agent LaBrandon Toefield re-signed.

=== NFL draft ===
2007 Jacksonville Jaguars draft
Round	Pick	Player	Position	College	Notes
1	21	Reggie Nelson *	Safety	Florida	
2	48	Justin Durant	Linebacker	Hampton	
3	79	Mike Walker	Wide receiver	Central Florida	
4	101	Adam Podlesh	Punter	Maryland	
4	113	Brian Smith	Linebacker	Missouri	
5	149	Uche Nwaneri	Guard	Purdue	
5	150	Josh Gattis	Safety	Wake Forest	
5	166	Derek Landri	Defensive tackle	Notre Dame	
7	229	John Broussard	Wide receiver	San Jose State	
7	251	Chad Nkang	Linebacker	Elon	
7	252	Andrew Carnahan	Offensive tackle	Arizona State	
Made roster † Pro Football Hall of Fame * Made at least one Pro Bowl during career

2007 Jacksonville Jaguars draft day trades
Round	Overall Picks	Team	Received
1	17	to Denver Broncos	Received Broncos' 2007 first round pick (21 overall), 2007 third round pick (86 overall), 2007 fifth round pick (198 overall)
3	86	to Baltimore Ravens	Received Ravens' 2007 fourth round pick (101 overall), 2007 fifth round pick (166 overall), and 2007 sixth round pick (203 overall)
6	194, 198, 203	to Atlanta Falcons	Received Falcons' 2007 fifth round pick (149 overall)

== Staff ==
2007 Jacksonville Jaguars staff
Front office: Chairman/chief executive officer – Wayne Weaver; Head coaches: Head coach – Jack Del Rio; Assistant head coach/secondary – Dave Campo; Assistant head coach/tight ends – Mike Tice; Offensive coaches: Offensive coordinator – Dirk Koetter; Quarterbacks – Mike Shula; Running backs – Kennedy Polamalu; Wide receivers – Todd Monken; Assistant wide receivers – Robert Prince; Offensive line – Andy Heck	Defensive coaches: Defensive coordinator – Mike Smith; Defensive line – Ray Hamilton; Linebackers – Mark Duffner; Defensive backs – Alvin Reynolds; Defensive assistant/Assistant Defensive Line – Ted Monachino; Special teams coaches: Special teams – Joe DeCamillis; Assistant special teams – Tom Williams; Strength and conditioning: Strength and conditioning – Mark Asanovich; Assistant strength and conditioning – Les Ebert

== Final roster ==
2007 Jacksonville Jaguars roster
Quarterbacks (QB): 9 David Garrard; 5 Quinn Gray; Running backs (RB): 33 Greg Jones FB; 32 Maurice Jones-Drew; 24 Montell Owens FB; 28 Fred Taylor; 22 LaBrandon Toefield KR; Wide receivers (WR): 18 Matt Jones; 86 Dennis Northcutt; 84 Chad Owens; 19 Ernest Wilford; 11 Reggie Williams; Tight ends (TE): 85 Richard Angulo; 89 Marcedes Lewis; 80 Isaac Smolko	Offensive linemen (OL): 69 Khalif Barnes T; 76 Richard Collier T; 67 Vince Manuwai G; 63 Brad Meester C; 62 Dennis Norman C; 77 Uche Nwaneri G; 79 Tony Pashos T; 78 Tutan Reyes G; 74 Maurice Williams G/T; Defensive linemen (DL): 57 Brent Hawkins DE; 97 Reggie Hayward DE; 98 John Henderson DT; 90 Grady Jackson DT; 66 Derek Landri DT; 93 Bobby McCray DE; 92 Rob Meier DT; 94 Jeremy Mincey DE; 91 Kenny Pettway DE; 95 Paul Spicer DE	Linebackers (LB): 56 Justin Durant OLB; 51 Clint Ingram OLB; 59 Brian Iwuh MLB; 53 Shantee Orr OLB; 54 Mike Peterson MLB; 52 Daryl Smith MLB; Defensive backs (DB): 21 Terry Cousin CB; 23 Jamaal Fudge SS; 31 Aaron Glenn CB; 26 Sammy Knight SS; 27 Rashean Mathis CB; 25 Reggie Nelson FS; 42 Chad Nkang FS; 20 Scott Starks CB; 34 Lamont Thompson FS; 29 Brian Williams CB; Special teams (ST): 3 Adam Podlesh P; 10 Josh Scobee K; 88 Joe Zelenka LS	Practice squad: 75 Andrew Carnahan T; 70 Walter Curry DT; 46 Charles Davis TE; 60 Samuel Gutekunst T ^{Int'l}; 39 Rashod Moulton CB/S; 12 Lester Ricard QB; 17 Charles Sharon WR; 35 D. D. Terry RB; 14 D'Juan Woods WR; Reserve: 15 John Broussard WR (IR); 83 Greg Estandia TE (IR); 50 Tony Gilbert LB (IR); 96 Tony McDaniel DT (IR); 73 Stockar McDougle G (IR); 65 Chris Naeole G (IR); -- Anthony Pudewell TE (IR); 38 Chris Roberson CB (IR); 43 Gerald Sensabaugh S (IR); 49 Brian Smith DE (IR); 99 Marcus Stroud DT (IR); 81 Mike Walker WR (IR); 87 George Wrighster TE (IR); -- James Wyche DE (IR); Rookies in italics 53 active, 14 reserve, 9 practice squad

== Preseason ==
The Jacksonville Jaguars pre-season schedule was announced on April 11, 2007.

Week	Date	Opponent	Result	Record	Venue
1	August 11	at Miami Dolphins	L 17–18	0–1	Dolphin Stadium
2	August 18	Tampa Bay Buccaneers	W 31–19	1–1	Jacksonville Municipal Stadium
3	August 23	at Green Bay Packers	W 21–13	2–1	Lambeau Field
4	August 30	Washington Redskins	W 31–14	3–1	Jacksonville Municipal Stadium

== Regular season ==
In addition to their regular games with AFC South division rivals, the Jaguars played games against the NFC South and AFC West in accordance with the NFL's scheduling formula established in 2002. The Jaguars also played games against the Bills and the Steelers based on finishing positions from 2006.

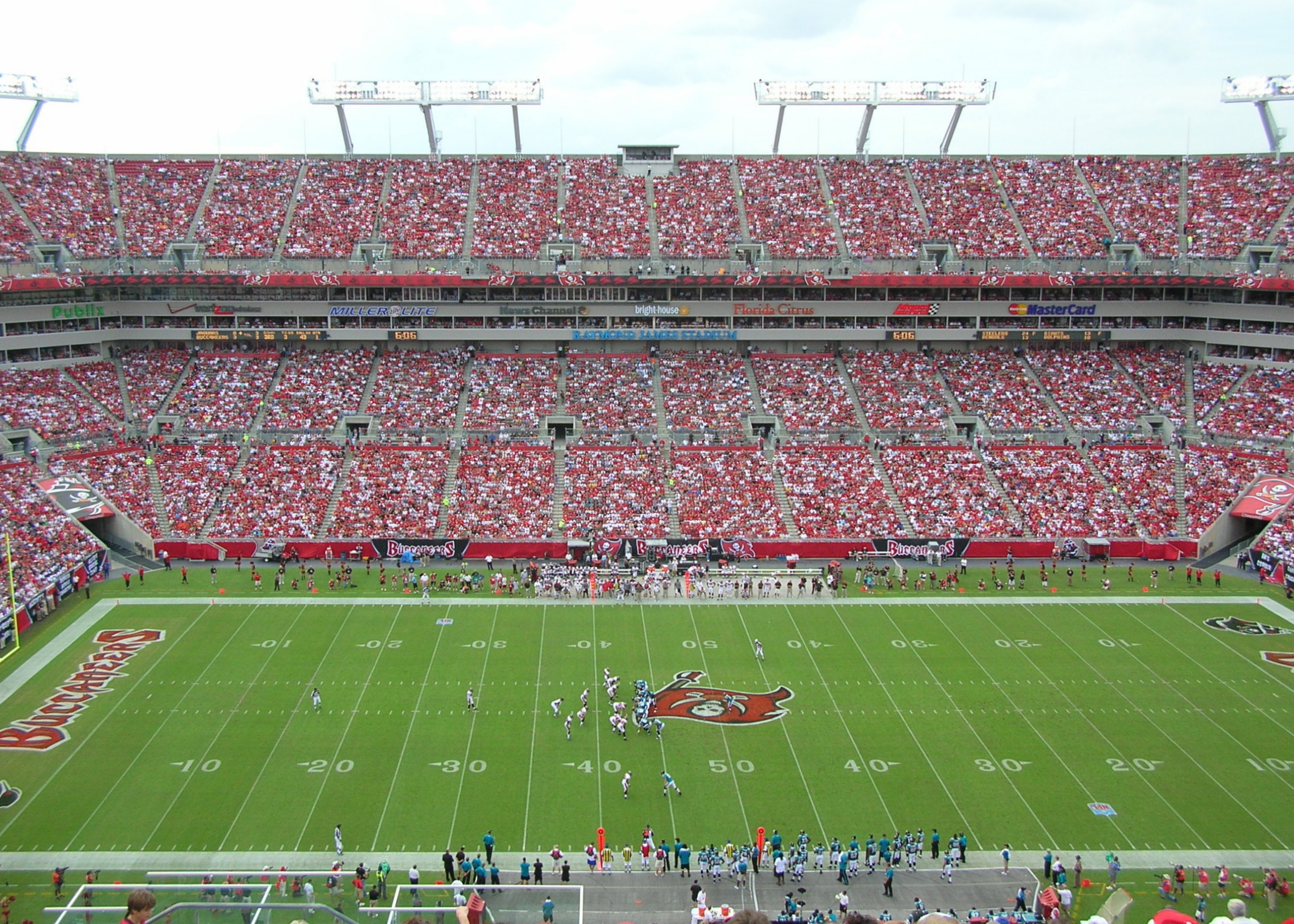
Jaguars and Buccaneers in Week 8

=== Schedule ===
Week	Date	Opponent	Result	Record	Venue	Attendance
1	September 9	**Tennessee Titans**	**L** 10–13	0–1	Jacksonville Municipal Stadium	65,437
2	September 16	Atlanta Falcons	**W** 13–7	1–1	Jacksonville Municipal Stadium	61,821
3	September 23	at Denver Broncos	**W** 23–14	2–1	Invesco Field at Mile High	76,463
4	Bye					
5	October 7	at Kansas City Chiefs	**W** 17–7	3–1	Arrowhead Stadium	76,971
6	October 14	**Houston Texans**	**W** 37–17	4–1	Jacksonville Municipal Stadium	63,715
7	October 22	**Indianapolis Colts**	**L** 7–29	4–2	Jacksonville Municipal Stadium	67,164
8	October 28	at Tampa Bay Buccaneers	**W** 24–23	5–2	Raymond James Stadium	65,133
9	November 4	at New Orleans Saints	**L** 24–41	5–3	Louisiana Superdome	70,009
10	November 11	at **Tennessee Titans**	**W** 28–13	6–3	LP Field	69,143
11	November 18	San Diego Chargers	**W** 24–17	7–3	Jacksonville Municipal Stadium	66,732
12	November 25	Buffalo Bills	**W** 36–14	8–3	Jacksonville Municipal Stadium	64,546
13	December 2	at **Indianapolis Colts**	**L** 25–28	8–4	RCA Dome	57,302
14	December 9	Carolina Panthers	**W** 37–6	9–4	Jacksonville Municipal Stadium	66,090
15	December 16	at Pittsburgh Steelers	**W** 29–22	10–4	Heinz Field	58,793
16	December 23	Oakland Raiders	**W** 49–11	11–4	Jacksonville Municipal Stadium	66,905
17	December 30	at **Houston Texans**	**L** 28–42	11–5	Reliant Stadium	70,660

Note: Intra-division opponents are in bold text.

=== Game summaries ===
==== Week 1: vs. Tennessee Titans ====
Week One: Tennessee Titans at Jacksonville Jaguars – Game summary

Quarter	1	2	3	4	Total
**Titans**	3	3	7	0	**13**
Jaguars	7	3	0	0	**10**

at Jacksonville Municipal Stadium, Jacksonville, Florida

- Date: September 9, 2007
- Game time: 1:00 p.m. EST
- Game weather: 86 °F (30 °C)
- Game attendance: 65,437
- Referee: Bill Carollo
- TV announcers (CBS): Don Criqui (play-by-play) and Steve Beuerlein (color commentator)
- Recap, Game Book

Game information

**First quarter**

- TEN – Rob Bironas 20-yard field goal, 4:03. Titans 3–0. **Drive: 13 plays, 77 yards, 6:35.**
- JAX – John Broussard 47-yard pass from David Garrard (Josh Scobee kick), 3:24. Jaguars 7–3. **Drive: 2 plays, 61 yards, 0:39.**

**Second quarter**

- JAX – Josh Scobee 22-yard field goal, 4:19. Jaguars 10–3. **Drive: 9 plays, 25 yards, 3:29.**
- TEN – Rob Bironas 31-yard field goal, 0:43. Jaguars 10–6. **Drive: 9 plays, 50 yards, 3:36.**

**Third quarter**

- No scoring plays.

**Fourth quarter**

- TEN – Vince Young 2-yard run (Rob Bironas kick), 0:59. Titans 13–10. **Drive: 12 plays, 79 yards, 6:34.**

**Top passers**

- TEN – Vince Young – 11/18, 78 yards, INT
- JAX – David Garrard – 17/30, 204 yards, TD

**Top rushers**

- TEN – Chris Brown – 19 rushes, 175 yards
- JAX – Maurice Jones-Drew – 7 rushes, 32 yards

**Top receivers**

- TEN – Justin Gage – 2 receptions, 26 yards
- JAX – Dennis Northcutt – 4 receptions, 57 yards

==== Week 2: vs. Atlanta Falcons ====
Week Two: Atlanta Falcons at Jacksonville Jaguars – Game summary

Quarter	1	2	3	4	Total
Falcons	0	7	0	0	**7**
**Jaguars**	0	3	0	10	**13**

at Jacksonville Municipal Stadium, Jacksonville, Florida

- Date: September 16, 2007
- Game time: 1:00 p.m. EST
- Game weather: 88 °F (31 °C)
- Game attendance: 61,821
- Referee: Tony Corrente
- TV announcers (Fox): Ron Pitts (play-by-play) and Tony Boselli (color commentator)
- Recap, Game Book

Game information

**First quarter**

- No scoring plays.

**Second quarter**

- JAX – John Carney 35-yard field goal, 13:30. Jaguars 3–0. **Drive: 9 plays, 68 yards, 4:45.**
- ATL – Warrick Dunn 4-yard run (Matt Prater kick), 0:57. Falcons 7–3. **Drive: 12 plays, 73 yards, 3:29.**

**Third quarter**

- No scoring plays.

**Fourth quarter**

- JAX – Reggie Williams 14-yard pass from David Garrard (John Carney kick), 14:10. Jaguars 10–7. **Drive: 8 plays, 80 yards, 4:58.**
- JAX – John Carney 27-yard field goal, 3:39. Jaguars 13–7. **Drive: 13 plays, 50 yards, 8:03.**

**Top passers**

- ATL – Joey Harrington – 12/20, 200 yards
- JAX – David Garrard – 17/25, 272 yards, TD

**Top rushers**

- ATL – Warrick Dunn – 13 rushes, 50 yards, TD
- JAX – Fred Taylor – 16 rushes, 56 yards

**Top receivers**

- ATL – Roddy White – 4 receptions, 81 yards
- JAX – Dennis Northcutt – 5 receptions, 75 yards

==== Week 3: at Denver Broncos ====
Week Three: Jacksonville Jaguars at Denver Broncos – Game summary

Quarter	1	2	3	4	Total
**Jaguars**	0	17	3	3	**23**
Broncos	0	7	0	7	**14**

at Invesco Field at Mile High, Denver, Colorado

- Date: September 23, 2007
- Game time: 2:05 p.m. MST
- Game weather: Mostly cloudy, 75 °F (24 °C)
- Game attendance: 76,463
- Referee: Terry McAulay
- TV announcers (CBS): Dick Enberg (play-by-play) and Randy Cross (color commentator)
- Recap, Game Book

Game information

**First quarter**

- No scoring plays.

**Second quarter**

- JAX – Reggie Williams 3-yard pass from David Garrard (John Carney kick), 13:09. Jaguars 7–0. **Drive: 18 plays, 80 yards, 11:44.**
- DEN – Nate Jackson 1-yard pass from Jay Cutler (Jason Elam kick), 6:40. Tied 7–7. **Drive: 10 plays, 80 yards, 6:29.**
- JAX – Greg Jones 4-yard run (John Carney kick), 1:56. Jaguars 14–7. **Drive: 9 plays, 52 yards, 4:44.**
- JAX – John Carney 19-yard field goal, 0:08. Jaguars 17–7. **Drive: 8 plays, 41 yards, 1:18.**

**Third quarter**

- JAX – John Carney 27-yard field goal, 13:11. Jaguars 20–7. **Drive: 4 plays, 9 yards, 1:45.**

**Fourth quarter**

- DEN – Travis Henry 6-yard run (Jason Elam kick), 12:41. Jaguars 20–14. **Drive: 9 plays, 60 yards, 3:41.**
- JAX – John Carney 18-yard field goal, 2:10. Jaguars 23–14. **Drive: 4 plays, 3 yards, 2:02.**

**Top passers**

- JAX – David Garrard – 14/20, 154 yards, TD
- DEN – Jay Cutler – 16/23, 222 yards, TD, INT

**Top rushers**

- JAX – Fred Taylor – 17 rushes, 84 yards
- DEN – Travis Henry – 11 rushes, 35 yards, TD

**Top receivers**

- JAX – Marcedes Lewis – 3 receptions, 44 yards
- DEN – Brandon Marshall – 7 receptions, 133 yards

==== Week 5: at Kansas City Chiefs ====
Week Five: Jacksonville Jaguars at Kansas City Chiefs – Game summary

Quarter	1	2	3	4	Total
**Jaguars**	3	7	0	7	**17**
Chiefs	0	0	0	7	**7**

at Arrowhead Stadium, Kansas City, Missouri

- Date: September 23, 2007
- Game time: 12:00 p.m. CDT
- Game weather: Overcast, 75 °F (24 °C)
- Game attendance: 76,917
- Referee: Jeff Triplette
- TV announcers (CBS): Gus Johnson (play-by-play) and Steve Tasker (color commentator)
- Recap, Game Book

Game information

**First quarter**

- JAX – John Carney 20-yard field goal, 0:00. Jaguars 3–0. **Drive: 18 plays, 77 yards, 10:55.**

**Second quarter**

- JAX – Maurice Jones-Drew 52-yard run (John Carney kick), 8:36. Jaguars 10–0. **Drive: 6 plays, 80 yards, 3:04.**

**Third quarter**

- No scoring plays.

**Fourth quarter**

- JAX – Dennis Northcutt 3-yard pass from David Garrard (John Carney kick), 8:26. Jaguars 17–0. **Drive: 9 plays, 81 yards, 5:03.**
- KC – Samie Parker 13-yard pass from Brodie Croyle (Dave Rayner kick), 0:00. Jaguars 17–7. **Drive: 11 plays, 70 yards, 1:54.**

**Top passers**

- JAX – David Garrard – 20/27, 218 yards, TD
- KC – Damon Huard – 19/30, 196 yards, INT

**Top rushers**

- JAX – Maurice Jones-Drew – 9 rushes, 82 yards, TD
- KC – Larry Johnson – 9 rushes, 12 yards

**Top receivers**

- JAX – Dennis Northcutt – 4 receptions, 73 yards, TD
- KC – Tony Gonzalez – 8 receptions, 100 yards

==== Week 6: vs. Houston Texans ====
Week Six: Houston Texans at Jacksonville Jaguars – Game summary

Quarter	1	2	3	4	Total
Texans	3	3	3	8	**17**
**Jaguars**	0	10	6	21	**37**

at Jacksonville Municipal Stadium, Jacksonville, Florida

- Date: October 14, 2007
- Game time: 1:00 p.m. EST
- Game weather: 81 °F (27 °C)
- Game attendance: 63,715
- Referee: Walt Coleman
- TV announcers (CBS): Gus Johnson (play-by-play) and Steve Tasker (color commentator)
- Recap, Game Book

Game information

**First quarter**

- HOU – Kris Brown 20-yard field goal, 10:24. Texans 3–0. **Drive: 10 plays, 78 yards, 4:36.**

**Second quarter**

- HOU – Kris Brown 35-yard field goal, 9:38. Texans 6–0. **Drive: 10 plays, 78 yards, 4:36.**
- JAX – George Wrighster 1-yard pass from David Garrard (John Carney kick), 3:51. Jaguars 7–6. **Drive: 13 plays, 76 yards, 5:47.**
- JAX – John Carney 37-yard field goal, 0:59. Jaguars 10–6. **Drive: 7 plays, 41 yards, 2:52.**

**Third quarter**

- JAX – Reggie Williams 7-yard pass from David Garrard (kick failed), 8:17. Jaguars 16–6. **Drive: 14 plays, 81 yards, 6:43.**
- HOU – Kris Brown 33-yard field goal, 1:40. Jaguars 16–9. **Drive: 10 plays, 39 yards, 4:52.**

**Fourth quarter**

- JAX – Maurice Jones-Drew 7-yard run (John Carney kick), 13:11. Jaguars 23–9. **Drive: 8 plays, 78 yards, 3:29.**
- JAX – Daryl Smith 77-yard fumble return (John Carney kick), 8:55. Jaguars 30–9.
- JAX – Maurice Jones-Drew 57-yard run (John Carney kick), 5:48. Jaguars 37–9. **Drive: 3 plays, 73 yards, 1:26.**
- HOU – Vonta Leach 1-yard pass from Sage Rosenfels (run succeeded), 0:29. Jaguars 37–17. **Drive: 15 plays, 89 yards, 5:19.**

**Top passers**

- HOU – Matt Schaub – 19/31, 259 yards, INT
- JAX – David Garrard – 22/34, 221 yards, 2 TD

**Top rushers**

- HOU – Ahman Green – 16 rushes, 44 yards
- JAX – Maurice Jones-Drew – 12 rushes, 125 yards, 2 TD

**Top receivers**

- HOU – Kevin Walter – 12 receptions, 160 yards
- JAX – Maurice Jones-Drew – 4 receptions, 59 yards

==== Week 7: vs. Indianapolis Colts ====
Week Seven: Indianapolis Colts at Jacksonville Jaguars – Game summary

Quarter	1	2	3	4	Total
**Colts**	7	10	2	10	**29**
Jaguars	0	0	7	0	**7**

at Jacksonville Municipal Stadium, Jacksonville, Florida

- Date: October 22, 2007
- Game time: 8:00 p.m. EST
- Game weather: 77 °F (25 °C)
- Game attendance: 7,184
- Referee: Scott Green
- TV announcers (ESPN): Mike Tirico (play-by-play), Ron Jaworski (color commentator), Tony Kornheiser (color commentator), Michele Tafoya (sideline reporter), & Suzy Kolber (sideline reporter)
- Recap, Game Book

Game information

**First quarter**

- IND – Kenton Keith 3-yard run (Adam Vinatieri kick), 0:37. Colts 7–0. **Drive: 11 plays, 66 yards, 5:06.**

**Second quarter**

- IND – Peyton Manning 1-yard run (Adam Vinatieri kick), 5:25. Colts 14–0. **Drive: 11 plays, 76 yards, 5:26.**
- IND – Adam Vinatieri 36-yard field goal, 0:29. Colts 17–0. **Drive: 11 plays, 30 yards, 2:20.**

**Third quarter**

- JAX – Maurice Jones-Drew 1-yard run (John Carney kick), 9:23. Colts 17–7. **Drive: 10 plays, 40 yards, 5:37.**
- IND – Quinn Gray sacked in end zone by Dwight Freeney for a safety, 4:35. Colts 19–7.

**Fourth quarter**

- IND – Adam Vinatieri 20-yard field goal, 13:34. Colts 22–7. **Drive: 13 plays, 55 yards, 6:01.**
- IND – Dallas Clark 35-yard pass from Peyton Manning (Adam Vinatieri kick), 3:58. Colts 29–7. **Drive: 4 plays, 54 yards, 1:06.**

**Top passers**

- IND – Peyton Manning – 23/37, 259 yards, TD, INT
- JAX – David Garrard – 8/12, 72 yards

**Top rushers**

- IND – Joseph Addai – 16 rushes, 85 yards
- JAX – Fred Taylor – 11 rushes, 55 yards

**Top receivers**

- IND – Reggie Wayne – 9 receptions, 131 yards
- JAX – Ernest Wilford – 6 receptions, 53 yards

==== Week 8: at Tampa Bay Buccaneers ====
Week Eight: Jacksonville Jaguars at Tampa Bay Buccaneers – Game summary

Quarter	1	2	3	4	Total
**Jaguars**	7	10	0	7	**24**
Buccaneers	3	10	10	0	**23**

at Raymond James Stadium, Tampa, Florida

- Date: October 28, 2007
- Game time: 4:05 p.m. EST
- Game weather: Cloudy, 84 °F (29 °C)
- Game attendance: 65,133
- Referee: Gene Steratore
- TV announcers (CBS): Ian Eagle (play-by-play) & Solomon Wilcots (color commentator)
- Recap, Game Book

Game information

**First quarter**

- TB – Matt Bryant 44-yard field goal, 7:26. Buccaneers 3–0. **Drive: 8 plays, 44 yards, 3:45.**
- JAX – LaBrandon Toefield 1-yard run (John Carney kick), 1:31. Jaguars 7–3. **Drive: 10 plays, 50 yards, 5:55.**

**Second quarter**

- JAX – John Carney 41-yard field goal, 7:25. Jaguars 10–3. **Drive: 5 plays, 34 yards, 2:11.**
- JAX – Aaron Glenn 28-yard interception return (John Carney kick), 7:09. Jaguars 17–3.
- TB – Joey Galloway 58-yard pass from Jeff Garcia (Matt Bryant kick), 5:45. Jaguars 17–10. **Drive: 3 plays, 81 yards, 1:24.**
- TB – Matt Bryant 22-yard field goal, 0:15. Jaguars 17–13. **Drive: 10 plays, 57 yards, 1:46.**

**Third quarter**

- TB – Michael Bennett 19-yard run (Matt Bryant kick), 3:19. Buccaneers 20–17. **Drive: 3 plays, 33 yards, 1:24.**
- TB – Matt Bryant 42-yard field goal, 0:05. Buccaneers 23–17. **Drive: 4 plays, 6 yards, 1:34.**

**Fourth quarter**

- JAX – Matt Jones 8-yard pass from Quinn Gray (John Carney kick), 11:37. Jaguars 24–23. **Drive: 8 plays, 53 yards, 3:28.**

**Top passers**

- JAX – Quinn Gray – 7/16, 100 yards, TD
- TB – Jeff Garcia – 19/41, 267 yards, TD, 3 INT

**Top rushers**

- JAX – Fred Taylor – 24 rushes, 68 yards
- TB – Earnest Graham – 14 rushes, 62 yards

**Top receivers**

- JAX – Greg Estandia – 1 reception, 30 yards
- TB – Joey Galloway – 6 receptions, 115 yards, TD

==== Week 9: at New Orleans Saints ====
Week Eight: Jacksonville Jaguars at New Orleans Saints – Game summary

Quarter	1	2	3	4	Total
Jaguars	17	0	0	7	**24**
**Saints**	17	7	14	3	**41**

at Louisiana Superdome, New Orleans, Louisiana

- Date: November 4, 2007
- Game time: 12:00 p.m. CST
- Game weather: None (indoor stadium)
- Game attendance: 70,009
- Referee: Gerry Austin
- TV announcers (CBS): Dick Enberg (play-by-play) & Randy Cross (color commentator)
- Recap, Game Book

Game information

**First quarter**

- NO – Olindo Mare 46-yard field goal, 12:15. Saints 3–0. **Drive: 7 plays, 40 yards, 2:45.**
- NO – Reggie Bush 1-yard run (Olindo Mare kick), 8:33. Saints 10–0. **Drive: 8 plays, 57 yards, 3:42.**
- JAX – Reggie Williams 80-yard pass from Quinn Gray (John Carney kick), 7:32. Saints 10–7. **Drive: 3 plays, 80 yards, 1:01.**
- JAX – John Carney 30-yard field goal, 2:01. Tied 10–10. **Drive: 10 plays, 78 yards, 4:16.**
- NO – Reggie Bush 2-yard pass from Drew Brees (Olindo Mare kick), 0:12. Saints 17–10. **Drive: 4 plays, 79 yards, 1:49.**
- JAX – Maurice Jones-Drew 100-yard kickoff return (John Carney kick), 0:00. Tied 17–17.

**Second quarter**

- NO – Lance Moore 8-yard pass from Drew Brees (Olindo Mare kick), 5:31. Saints 24–17. **Drive: 9 plays, 75 yards, 4:18.**

**Third quarter**

- NO – Mike McKenzie 75-yard interception return (Olindo Mare kick), 8:47. Saints 31–17.
- NO – David Patten 4-yard pass from Drew Brees (Olindo Mare kick), 2:02. Saints 38–17. **Drive: 9 plays, 67 yards, 4:54.**

**Fourth quarter**

- JAX – Dennis Northcutt 15-yard pass from Quinn Gray (John Carney kick), 9:32. Saints 38–24. **Drive: 3 plays, 86 yards, 1:37.**
- NO – Olindo Mare 34-yard field goal, 3:01. Saints 41–24. **Drive: 12 plays, 54 yards, 6:31.**

**Top passers**

- JAX – Quinn Gray – 20/33, 354 yards, 2 TD, 3 INT
- NO – Drew Brees – 35/45, 445 yards, 3 TD

**Top rushers**

- JAX – Fred Taylor – 13 rushes, 54 yards
- NO – Reggie Bush – 17 rushes, 72 yards, TD

**Top receivers**

- JAX – Reggie Williams – 6 receptions, 128 yards, TD
- NO – Marques Colston – 10 receptions, 159 yards

==== Week 10: at Tennessee Titans ====
Week Ten: Jacksonville Jaguars at Tennessee Titans – Game summary

Quarter	1	2	3	4	Total
**Jaguars**	7	7	7	7	**28**
Titans	0	3	3	7	**13**

at LP Field, Nashville, Tennessee

- Date: November 11, 2007
- Game time: 12:00 p.m. CST
- Game weather: Cloudy, 62 °F (17 °C)
- Game attendance: 69,143
- Referee: Ed Hochuli
- TV announcers (CBS): Kevin Harlan (play-by-play) & Rich Gannon (color commentator)
- Recap, Game Book

Game information

**First quarter**

- JAX – Greg Jones 2-yard pass from Quinn Gray (John Carney kick), 2:00. Jaguars 7–0. **Drive: 13 plays, 80 yards, 7:31.**

**Second quarter**

- JAX – Maurice Jones-Drew 8-yard run (John Carney kick), 5:07. Jaguars 14–0. **Drive: 13 plays, 53 yards, 7:06.**
- TEN – Rob Bironas 36-yard field goal, 0:00. Jaguars 14–3. **Drive: 11 plays, 57 yards, 1:51.**

**Third quarter**

- JAX – Fred Taylor 4-yard run (John Carney kick), 7:49. Jaguars 21–3. **Drive: 2 plays, 26 yards, 0:34.**
- TEN – Rob Bironas 49-yard field goal, 4:44. Jaguars 21–6. **Drive: 7 plays, 55 yards, 3:05.**

**Fourth quarter**

- TEN – Justin Gage 20-yard pass from Vince Young (Rob Bironas kick), 14:54. Jaguars 21–13. **Drive: 10 plays, 67 yards, 3:06.**
- JAX – Greg Jones 3-yard run (John Carney kick), 4:47. Jaguars 28–13. **Drive: 11 plays, 47 yards, 5:46.**

**Top passers**

- JAX – Quinn Gray – 13/23, 101 yards, TD
- TEN – Vince Young – 24/41, 257 yards, TD, 2 INT

**Top rushers**

- JAX – Maurice Jones-Drew – 19 rushes, 101 yards, TD
- TEN – Vince Young – 8 rushes, 52 yards

**Top receivers**

- JAX – Maurice Jones-Drew – 3 receptions, 28 yards
- TEN – Justin Gage – 7 receptions, 90 yards, TD

==== Week 11: vs. San Diego Chargers ====
Week Eleven: San Diego Chargers at Jacksonville Jaguars – Game summary

Quarter	1	2	3	4	Total
Chargers	0	3	7	7	**17**
Jaguars	10	7	7	0	**24**

at Jacksonville Municipal Stadium, Jacksonville, Florida

- Date: November 18, 2007
- Game time: 1:00 p.m. EDT
- Game weather: 70 °F (21 °C)
- Game attendance: 66,732
- Referee: Larry Nemmers
- TV announcers (CBS): Greg Gumbel & Dan Dierdorf
- Recap, Game Book

Game information

**First quarter**

- JAX – Josh Scobee 48-yard field goal, 9:12. Jaguars 3–0. **Drive: 12 plays, 46 yards, 5:48.**
- JAX – Maurice Jones-Drew 1-yard run (Josh Scobee kick), 0:40. Jaguars 10–0. **Drive: 11 plays, 48 yards, 5:19.**

**Second quarter**

- SD – Nate Kaeding 23-yard field goal, 9:58. Jaguars 10–3. **Drive: 12 plays, 75 yards, 5:42.**
- JAX – Reggie Williams 36-yard pass from David Garrard (Josh Scobee kick), 5:25. Jaguars 17–3. **Drive: 9 plays, 73 yards, 4:33.**

**Third quarter**

- SD – LaDainian Tomlinson 6-yard run (Nate Kaeding kick), 13:19. Jaguars 17–10. **Drive: 5 plays, 60 yards, 1:41.**
- JAX – Marcedes Lewis 1-yard pass from David Garrard (Josh Scobee kick), 5:02 Jaguars 24–10. **Drive: 5 plays, 87 yards, 2:59.**

**Fourth quarter**

- SD – Antonio Gates 24-yard pass from Philip Rivers (Nate Kaeding kick), 5:06. Jaguars 24–17. **Drive: 7 plays, 90 yards, 1:57.**

**Top passers**

- SD – Philip Rivers – 22/40, 309 yards, TD, 2 INT
- JAX – David Garrard – 15/24, 189 yards, 2 TD

**Top rushers**

- SD – LaDainian Tomlinson – 16 rushes, 62 yards, TD
- JAX – Fred Taylor – 20 rushes, 85 yards

**Top receivers**

- SD – Chris Chambers – 4 receptions, 93 yards
- JAX – Reggie Williams – 2 receptions, 62 yards, TD

==== Week 12: vs. Buffalo Bills ====
Week Twelve: Buffalo Bills at Jacksonville Jaguars – Game summary

Quarter	1	2	3	4	Total
Bills	0	7	7	0	**14**
**Jaguars**	10	6	3	17	**36**

at Jacksonville Municipal Stadium, Jacksonville, Florida

- Date: November 25, 2007
- Game time: 1:00 p.m. EST
- Game weather: 68 °F (20 °C)
- Game attendance: 64,546
- Referee: Pete Morelli
- TV announcers (CBS): Kevin Harlan (play-by-play) & Rich Gannon (color commentator)
- Recap, Game Book

Game information

**First quarter**

- JAX – Fred Taylor 50-yard run (Josh Scobee kick), 9:40. Jaguars 7–0. **Drive: 7 plays, 85 yards, 3:18.**
- JAX – Josh Scobee 46-yard field goal, 1:21. Jaguars 10–0. **Drive: 10 plays, 39 yards, 5:04.**

**Second quarter**

- JAX – Josh Scobee 33-yard field goal, 10:56. Jaguars 13–0. **Drive: 7 plays, 12 yards, 3:20.**
- BUF – Anthony Thomas 10-yard pass from J. P. Losman (Rian Lindell kick), 6:03. Jaguars 13–7. **Drive: 10 plays, 72 yards, 4:53.**
- JAX – Josh Scobee 22-yard field goal, 0:04. Jaguars 16–7. **Drive: 8 plays, 51 yards, 1:52.**

**Third quarter**

- JAX – Josh Scobee 23-yard field goal, 8:06. Jaguars 19–7. **Drive: 14 plays, 75 yards, 6:54.**
- BUF – Roscoe Parrish 24-yard run (Rian Lindell kick), 1:29. Jaguars 19–14. **Drive: 8 plays, 45 yards, 4:21.**

**Fourth quarter**

- JAX – Josh Scobee 20-yard field goal, 14:10. Jaguars 22–14. **Drive: 8 plays, 53 yards, 2:19.**
- JAX – Reggie Williams 59-yard pass from David Garrard (Josh Scobee kick), 2:39. Jaguars 29–14. **Drive: 4 plays, 73 yards, 2:23.**
- JAX – Maurice Jones-Drew 17-yard run (Josh Scobee kick), 1:43. Jaguars 36–14. **Drive: 1 play, 17 yards, 0:05.**

**Top passers**

- BUF – J. P. Losman – 27/40, 211 yards, TD, 2 INT
- JAX – David Garrard – 23/37, 296 yards, TD

**Top rushers**

- BUF – Anthony Thomas – 15 rushes, 46 yards
- JAX – Fred Taylor – 14 rushes, 104 yards, TD

**Top receivers**

- BUF – Josh Reed – 6 receptions, 50 yards
- JAX – Dennis Northcutt – 5 receptions, 65 yards

==== Week 13: at Indianapolis Colts ====
Week Thirteen: Jacksonville Jaguars at Indianapolis Colts – Game summary

Quarter	1	2	3	4	Total
Jaguars	0	7	7	11	**25**
**Colts**	14	7	0	7	**28**

at RCA Dome, Indianapolis, Indiana

- Date: December 2, 2007
- Game time: 1:00 p.m. EST
- Game weather: None (indoor stadium)
- Game attendance: 57,302
- Referee: Terry McAulay
- TV announcers (CBS): Jim Nantz (play-by-play) & Phil Simms (color commentator)
- Recap, Game Book

Game information

**First quarter**

- IND – Dallas Clark 5-yard pass from Peyton Manning (Adam Vinatieri kick), 9:30. Colts 7–0. **Drive: 3 plays, 11 yards, 0:41.**
- IND – Reggie Wayne 48-yard pass from Peyton Manning (Adam Vinatieri kick), 1:31. Colts 14–0. **Drive: 8 plays, 63 yards, 3:25.**

**Second quarter**

- JAX – Maurice Jones-Drew 2-yard run (Josh Scobee kick), 5:21. Colts 14–7. **Drive: 16 plays, 84 yards, 11:10.**
- IND – Dallas Clark 14-yard pass from Peyton Manning (Adam Vinatieri kick), 0:06. Colts 21–7. **Drive: 14 plays, 80 yards, 5:15.**

**Third quarter**

- JAX – Marcedes Lewis 2-yard pass from David Garrard (Josh Scobee kick), 8:06 Colts 21–14. **Drive: 12 plays, 69 yards, 6:54.**

**Fourth quarter**

- JAX – Josh Scobee 47-yard field goal, 11:36. Colts 21–17. **Drive: 13 plays, 38 yards, 6:40.**
- IND – Luke Lawton 1-yard pass from Peyton Manning (Adam Vinatieri kick), 8:26. Colts 28–17. **Drive: 7 plays, 63 yards, 3:10.**
- JAX – Dennis Northcutt 17-yard pass from David Garrard (run succeeded), 2:47 Colts 28–25. **Drive: 8 plays, 78 yards, 3:01.**

**Top passers**

- JAX – David Garrard – 24/29, 257 yards, 2 TD, INT
- IND – Peyton Manning – 20/29, 288 yards, 4 TD, INT

**Top rushers**

- JAX – Fred Taylor – 19 rushes, 104 yards
- IND – Joseph Addai – 21 rushes, 67 yards

**Top receivers**

- JAX – Ernest Wilford – 5 receptions, 72 yards
- IND – Reggie Wayne – 8 receptions, 158 yards, TD

==== Week 14: vs. Carolina Panthers ====
Week Fourteen: Carolina Panthers at Jacksonville Jaguars – Game summary

Quarter	1	2	3	4	Total
Panthers	0	6	0	0	**6**
**Jaguars**	7	3	10	17	**37**

at Jacksonville Municipal Stadium, Jacksonville, Florida

- Date: December 9, 2007
- Game time: 1:00 p.m. EST
- Game weather: 77 °F (25 °C)
- Game attendance: 66,090
- Referee: John Parry
- TV announcers (Fox): Ron Pitts (play-by-play) & Tony Boselli (color commentator)
- Recap, Game Book

Game information

**First quarter**

- JAX – Reggie Williams 22-yard pass from David Garrard (Josh Scobee kick), 3:30. Jaguars 7–0. **Drive: 7 plays, 55 yards, 3:45.**

**Second quarter**

- CAR – John Kasay 49-yard field goal, 11:28. Jaguars 7–3. **Drive: 7 plays, 27 yards, 2:39.**
- JAX – Josh Scobee 21-yard field goal, 5:33. Jaguars 10–3. **Drive: 12 plays, 72 yards, 5:55.**
- CAR – John Kasay 39-yard field goal, 1:03. Jaguars 10–6. **Drive: 5 plays, 16 yards, 1:11.**

**Third quarter**

- JAX – Matt Jones 6-yard pass from David Garrard (Josh Scobee kick), 11:28. Jaguars 17–6. **Drive: 6 plays, 21 yards, 3:21.**
- JAX – Josh Scobee 20-yard field goal, 1:21. Jaguars 20–6. **Drive: 14 plays, 72 yards, 7:04.**

**Fourth quarter**

- JAX – Clint Ingram 39-yard interception return (Josh Scobee kick), 14:50. Jaguars 20–6.
- JAX – Fred Taylor 80-yard run (Josh Scobee kick), 9:48. Jaguars 34–6. **Drive: 1 play, 80 yards, 0:13.**
- JAX – Josh Scobee 33-yard field goal, 3:15. Jaguars 37–6. **Drive: 9 plays, 31 yards, 5:00.**

**Top passers**

- CAR – Vinny Testaverde – 13/28, 84 yards, INT
- JAX – David Garrard – 20/36, 230 yards, 2 TD

**Top rushers**

- CAR – DeShaun Foster – 11 rushes, 46 yards
- JAX – Fred Taylor – 18 rushes, 132 yards, TD

**Top receivers**

- CAR – Steve Smith Sr. – 6 receptions, 44 yards
- JAX – Reggie Williams – 5 receptions, 90 yards, TD

==== Week 15: at Pittsburgh Steelers ====
Week Fifteen: Jacksonville Jaguars at Pittsburgh Steelers – Game summary

Quarter	1	2	3	4	Total
**Jaguars**	3	7	12	7	**29**
Steelers	0	7	0	15	**22**

at Heinz Field, Pittsburgh, Pennsylvania

- Date: December 16, 2007
- Game time: 1:00 p.m. EST
- Game weather: Light snow, 35 °F (2 °C)
- Game attendance: 58,793
- Referee: Gene Steratore
- TV announcers (CBS): Greg Gumbel (play-by-play) and Dan Dierdorf (color commentator)
- Recap, Game Book

Game information

**First quarter**

- JAX – Josh Scobee 36-yard field goal, 9:36. Jaguars 3–0. **Drive: 8 plays, 42 yards, 3:39.**

**Second quarter**

- PIT – Heath Miller 18-yard pass from Ben Roethlisberger (Jeff Reed kick), 14:31. Steelers 7–3. **Drive: 4 plays, 31 yards, 0:42.**
- JAX – Ernest Wilford 12-yard pass from David Garrard (Josh Scobee kick), 1:01 Jaguars 10–7. **Drive: 12 plays, 68 yards, 5:06.**

**Third quarter**

- JAX – Reggie Williams 3-yard pass from David Garrard (kick failed), 5:20. Jaguars 16–7. **Drive: 20 plays, 74 yards, 9:40.**
- JAX – Dennis Northcutt 55-yard pass from David Garrard (kick failed), 3:47. Jaguars 22–7. **Drive: 1 play, 55 yards, 0:10.**

**Fourth quarter**

- PIT – Hines Ward 11-yard pass from Ben Roethlisberger (Jeff Reed kick), 13:11. Jaguars 22–14. **Drive: 3 plays, 12 yards, 0:52.**
- PIT – Nate Washington 30-yard pass from Ben Roethlisberger (pass succeeded), 5:46. Tied 22–22. **Drive: 8 plays, 84 yards, 3:43.**
- JAX – Fred Taylor 12-yard run (Josh Scobee kick), 1:57. Jaguars 29–22. **Drive: 8 plays, 73 yards, 3:49.**

**Top passers**

- JAX – David Garrard – 17/33, 197 yards, 3 TD, INT
- PIT – Ben Roethlisberger – 15/32, 142 yards, 3 TD

**Top rushers**

- JAX – Fred Taylor – 25 rushes, 147 yards, TD
- PIT – Willie Parker – 14 rushes, 100 yards

**Top receivers**

- JAX – Dennis Northcutt – 4 receptions, 81 yards, TD
- PIT – Santonio Holmes – 4 receptions, 34 yards

==== Week 16: vs. Oakland Raiders ====
Week Sixteen: Oakland Raiders at Jacksonville Jaguars – Game summary

Quarter	1	2	3	4	Total
Raiders	0	3	0	8	**11**
**Jaguars**	14	14	7	14	**49**

at Jacksonville Municipal Stadium, Jacksonville, Florida

- Date: December 23, 2007
- Game time: 1:00 p.m. EST
- Game weather: 69 °F (21 °C)
- Game attendance: 66,905
- Referee: Jerome Boger
- TV announcers (CBS): Ian Eagle (play-by-play) & Solomon Wilcots (color commentator)
- Recap, Game Book

Game information

**First quarter**

- JAX – Fred Taylor 62-yard run (Josh Scobee kick), 12:02. Jaguars 7–0. **Drive: 1 play, 67 yards, 0:45.**
- JAX – Maurice Jones-Drew 14-yard run (Josh Scobee kick), 3:21. Jaguars 14–0. **Drive: 7 plays, 84 yards, 3:42.**

**Second quarter**

- OAK – Sebastian Janikowski 41-yard field goal, 13:59. Jaguars 14–3. **Drive: 4 plays, 2 yards, 0:51.**
- JAX – Greg Jones 2-yard pass from David Garrard (Josh Scobee kick), 9:12. Jaguars 21–3. **Drive: 1 play, 2 yards, 0:04.**
- JAX – David Garrard 2-yard run (Josh Scobee kick), 6:08. Jaguars 28–3. **Drive: 3 plays, 34 yards, 1:31.**

**Third quarter**

- JAX – Matt Jones 37-yard pass from David Garrard (Josh Scobee kick), 6:16. Jaguars 35–3. **Drive: 6 plays, 29 yards, 2:55.**

**Fourth quarter**

- JAX – Reggie Williams 9-yard pass from David Garrard (Josh Scobee kick), 13:00. Jaguars 42–3. **Drive: 6 plays, 29 yards, 2:55.**
- JAX – Richard Angulo 7-yard pass from Quinn Gray (Josh Scobee kick), 4:52. Jaguars 49–3. **Drive: 3 plays, 14 yards, 1:28.**
- OAK – Zach Miller 2-yard pass from JaMarcus Russell (pass succeeded), 0:06. Jaguars 49–11. **Drive: 12 plays, 70 yards, 4:46.**

**Top passers**

- OAK – JaMarcus Russell – 7/23, 83 yards, TD, 3 INT
- JAX – David Garrard – 11/18, 199 yards, 2 TD, INT

**Top rushers**

- OAK – Dominic Rhodes – 27 rushes, 115 yards
- JAX – Fred Taylor – 7 rushes, 111 yards, TD

**Top receivers**

- OAK – Zach Miller – 3 receptions, 27 yards
- JAX – Maurice Jones-Drew – 6 receptions, 96 yards

==== Week 17: at Houston Texans ====
Week Seventeen: Jacksonville Jaguars at Houston Texans – Game summary

Quarter	1	2	3	4	Total
Jaguars	7	7	7	7	**28**
**Texans**	0	21	14	7	**42**

at Reliant Stadium, Houston, Texas

- Date: December 30, 2007
- Game time: 1:00 p.m. EST
- Game weather: Sunny, 59 °F (15 °C)
- Game attendance: 70,660
- Referee: Tony Corrente
- TV announcers (CBS): Dick Enberg (play-by-play) & Randy Cross (color commentator)
- Recap, Game Book

Game information

**First quarter**

- JAX – Reggie Williams 22-yard pass from Quinn Gray (Josh Scobee kick), 7:12. Jaguars 7–0. **Drive: 14 plays, 84 yards, 7:48.**

**Second quarter**

- HOU – Ron Dayne 2-yard run (Kris Brown kick), 14:57. Tied 7–7. **Drive: 2 plays, 6 yards, 0:11.**
- HOU – Owen Daniels 2-yard pass from Sage Rosenfels (Kris Brown kick), 3:21. Texans 14–7. **Drive: 15 plays, 84 yards, 8:34.**
- JAX – Ernest Wilford 22-yard pass from Quinn Gray (Josh Scobee kick), 0:29. Tied 14–14. **Drive: 9 plays, 66 yards, 2:52.**
- HOU – André Davis 97-yard kickoff return (Kris Brown kick), 0:15. Texans 21–14.

**Third quarter**

- HOU – André Davis 104-yard kickoff return (Kris Brown kick), 14:47. Texans 28–14.
- HOU – Ron Dayne 12-yard run (Kris Brown kick), 7:19. Texans 35–14. **Drive: 9 plays, 64 yards, 5:10.**
- JAX – Matt Jones 5-yard pass from Quinn Gray (Josh Scobee kick), 1:53. Texans 35–21. **Drive: 10 plays, 82 yards, 5:26.**

**Fourth quarter**

- HOU – Darius Walker 1-yard run (Kris Brown kick), 13:07. Texans 42–21. **Drive: 7 plays, 71 yards, 3:46.**
- JAX – Ernest Wilford 17-yard pass from Quinn Gray (Josh Scobee kick), 2:56. Texans 42–28. **Drive: 12 plays, 57 yards, 7:17.**

**Top passers**

- JAX – Quinn Gray – 25/39, 197 yards, 4 TD
- HOU – Sage Rosenfels – 11/18, 128 yards, TD, INT

**Top rushers**

- JAX – Greg Jones – 14 rushes, 71 yards
- HOU – Ron Dayne – 21 rushes, 88 yards, 2 TD

**Top receivers**

- JAX – Matt Jones – 8 receptions, 138 yards, TD
- HOU – Andre Johnson – 6 receptions, 74 yards

=== Standings ===
==== Division ====
AFC South
	W	L	T	PCT	DIV	CONF	PF	PA	STK
^{(2)} Indianapolis Colts	13	3	0	.813	5–1	9–3	450	262	L1
^{(5)} Jacksonville Jaguars	11	5	0	.688	2–4	8–4	411	304	L1
^{(6)} Tennessee Titans	10	6	0	.625	4–2	7–5	301	297	W3
Houston Texans	8	8	0	.500	1–5	5–7	379	384	W1

==== Conference ====
AFC
#	Team	Division	W	L	T	PCT	DIV	CONF	SOS	SOV	STK
**Division leaders**
1	New England Patriots	East	16	0	0	1.000	6–0	12–0	.469	.469	W16
2	Indianapolis Colts	South	13	3	0	.813	5–1	9–3	.516	.457	L1
3	San Diego Chargers	West	11	5	0	.688	5–1	9–3	.531	.477	W6
4 (Note: Pittsburgh finished ahead of Cleveland based on head-to-head sweep.)	Pittsburgh Steelers	North	10	6	0	.625	5–1	7–5	.453	.531	L1
**Wild cards**
5	Jacksonville Jaguars	South	11	5	0	.688	2–4	8–4	.516	.460	L1
6 (Note: Tennessee finished ahead of Cleveland based on win percentage in common games (4–1 vs. 3–2 against: Cincinnati, Houston, NY Jets, and Oakland).)	Tennessee Titans	South	10	6	0	.625	4–2	7–5	.500	.438	W3
**Did not qualify for the postseason**
7	Cleveland Browns	North	10	6	0	.625	3–3	7–5	.430	.344	W1
8	Houston Texans	South	8	8	0	.500	1–5	5–7	.516	.391	W1
9 (Note: Denver finished ahead of Buffalo and Cincinnati based on strength of victory.)	Denver Broncos	West	7	9	0	.438	3–3	6–6	.516	.420	W1
10 (Note: Buffalo finished ahead of Cincinnati based on head-to-head victory.)	Buffalo Bills	East	7	9	0	.438	4–2	6–6	.516	.277	L3
11	Cincinnati Bengals	North	7	9	0	.438	3–3	6–6	.461	.339	W2
12	Baltimore Ravens	North	5	11	0	.313	1–5	2–10	.516	.375	W1
13 (Note: New York finished ahead of Kansas City based on head-to-head victory. Division tie break was initially used to eliminate Oakland (see below).)	New York Jets	East	4	12	0	.250	2–4	4–8	.523	.250	W1
14 (Note: Kansas City finished ahead of Oakland based on win percentage in common games (2–11 vs. 1–12 against: Houston, Chicago, Minnesota, San Diego, Jacksonville, Green Bay, Denver, Indianapolis, Tennessee, and Detroit).)	Kansas City Chiefs	West	4	12	0	.250	2–4	3–9	.516	.469	L9
15	Oakland Raiders	West	4	12	0	.250	2–4	4–8	.516	.344	L4
16	Miami Dolphins	East	1	15	0	.063	0–6	1–11	.539	.313	L2
**Tiebreakers** (Note: When breaking ties for three or more teams under the NFL's rules, they are first broken within divisions, then comparing only the highest ranked remaining team from each division.)

== Postseason ==
=== Schedule ===
Round	Date	Opponent	Result	Record	Venue	Attendance
Wild Card	January 5, 2008	at Pittsburgh Steelers (4)	W 31–29	1–0	Heinz Field	63,629
Divisional	January 12, 2008	at New England Patriots (1)	L 20–31	1–1	Gillette Stadium	68,756

=== Game summaries ===
==== AFC Wild Card Playoffs: at (4) Pittsburgh Steelers ====
AFC Wild Card Playoffs: (5) Jacksonville Jaguars at (4) Pittsburgh Steelers – Game summary

Quarter	1	2	3	4	Total
Jaguars	7	14	7	3	31
Steelers	7	0	3	19	29

at Heinz Field, Pittsburgh

- Date: January 5, 2008
- Game time: 8:00 p.m. EST
- Game weather: Light rain, 39 °F (4 °C)
- Game attendance: 63,629
- Referee: Scott Green
- TV announcers (NBC): Al Michaels (play-by-play), John Madden (color commentator) and Andrea Kremer (sideline reporter)
- Recap, Game Book

Game information

First quarter

- PIT – Najeh Davenport 1-yard run (Jeff Reed kick), 10:03. Steelers 7–0. Drive: 10 plays, 80 yards, 4:57.
- JAX – Fred Taylor 1-yard run (Josh Scobee kick), 9:39. Tied 7–7. Drive: 1 play, 1 yard, 0:24.

Second quarter

- JAX – Rashean Mathis 63-yard interception return (Josh Scobee kick), 10:19. Jaguars 14–7.
- JAX – Maurice Jones-Drew 35-yard pass from David Garrard (Josh Scobee kick), 8:34. Jaguars 21–7. Drive: 3 plays, 46 yards, 0:56.

Third quarter

- PIT – Jeff Reed 28-yard field goal, 9:24. Jaguars 21–10. Drive: 8 plays, 33 yards, 4:45.
- JAX – Maurice Jones-Drew 10-yard run (Josh Scobee kick), 4:39. Jaguars 28–10. Drive: 8 plays, 82 yards, 4:45.

Fourth quarter

- PIT – Santonio Holmes 37-yard pass from Ben Roethlisberger (Jeff Reed kick), 14:53. Jaguars 28–17. Drive: 10 plays, 69 yards, 4:46.
- PIT – Heath Miller 14-yard pass from Ben Roethlisberger (run failed), 10:25. Jaguars 28–23. Drive: 10 plays, 69 yards, 3:49.
- PIT – Najeh Davenport 1-yard run (pass failed), 6:21. Steelers 29–28. Drive: 7 plays, 16 yards, 2:29.
- JAX – Josh Scobee 25-yard field goal, 0:37. Jaguars 31–29. Drive: 8 plays, 44 yards, 2:01.

Top passers

- JAX – David Garrard – 9/21, 140 yards, TD, 2 INT
- PIT – Ben Roethlisberger – 29/42, 337 yards, 2 TD, 3 INT

Top rushers

- JAX – David Garrard – 5 rushes, 58 yards
- PIT – Najeh Davenport – 16 rushes, 25 yards, 2 TD

Top receivers

- JAX – Maurice Jones-Drew – 1 reception, 43 yards, TD
- PIT – Hines Ward – 10 receptions, 135 yards

Jacksonville gained only 239 yards of offense, but still managed to win on Josh Scobee's 25-yard field goal with 37 seconds left in the game. The Jaguars defense sacked Steelers quarterback Ben Roethlisberger six times, intercepted three of his passes, and forced him to lose a fumble on the final drive of the game.

Pittsburgh opened up the scoring by marching 80 yards in 10 plays on their first drive and finishing it off with Najeh Davenport's 1-yard touchdown run. But Jaguars running back Maurice Jones-Drew returned the ensuing kickoff 96 yards to the 1-yard line (the longest play in NFL postseason history that did not result in a touchdown), and Fred Taylor scored a 1-yard touchdown run on the next play.

Early in the second quarter, Jacksonville defensive back Rashean Mathis intercepted pass from Roethlisberger and returned it 63 yards for a touchdown. Then shortly after the kickoff, Mathis intercepted another pass at the Steelers 46-yard line, setting up David Garrard's 43-yard touchdown pass to Jones-Drew and making the score 21–7. Later in the second quarter, the Steelers took advantage of a missed Scobee field goal by driving all the way to the Jaguars 21-yard line. But defensive tackle Derek Landri intercepted a short pass from Roethlisberger, and the score remained 21–7 at halftime.

In the second half, the Steelers scored on their first four drives. Three plays after the opening kickoff, linebacker James Farrior's interception of a Garrard pass set up Jeff Reed's 28-yard field goal. Jacksonville responded by driving 82 yards in 8 plays, with Garrard rushing for 15 yards and completing two passes to Ernest Wilford for 39, while Jones-Drew capped the drive with a 10-yard touchdown run, increasing their lead to 28–10. But the Steelers drove right back, and on the first play of the fourth quarter, facing fourth down and 12 on the Jags 37-yard line, Roethlisberger threw a 37-yard touchdown pass to Santonio Holmes. Then after a punt, Roethlisberger completed six passes for 65 yards on a 69-yard drive that ended with his 14-yard touchdown pass to Heath Miller. The Steelers attempted a two-point conversion to cut the lead to three points, and Rothlisberger initially completed a pass to Hines Ward, but the play was nullified by a holding penalty and Pittsburgh's second attempt was incomplete, keeping the score at 28–23.

Three plays after the ensuing kickoff, Steelers defensive back Ike Taylor intercepted a pass from Garrard and returned it 31 yards to the Jacksonville 16-yard line. Following a pass interference penalty against the Jaguars in the end zone on a fourth down play, Davenport scored his second 1-yard touchdown run of the day. The two-point conversion failed again, but the Steelers took the lead, 29–28.

Jacksonville was unable to score on their next drive, but they forced the Steelers to punt after three plays and Dennis Northcutt returned the punt 16 yards, giving the Jaguars the ball at their own 49-yard line with 1 timeout remaining and 2:38 left to play. Three plays later on fourth down and 2, Garrard dropped back to pass, but then ran back to the line and took off for a 32-yard burst to the Steelers 11-yard line. After a few more running plays, Scobee kicked a 25-yard field goal, giving his team a 31–29 lead. The Steelers got the ball back with 37 seconds left, but Jaguars defensive end Bobby McCray sealed the victory by forcing a fumble which was recovered by defensive tackle Derek Landri.

With the win, the Jaguars improved their overall record to 12–5.

==== AFC Divisional Playoffs: at (1) New England Patriots ====
AFC Divisional Playoffs: (5) Jacksonville Jaguars at (1) New England Patriots – Game summary

Quarter	1	2	3	4	Total
Jaguars	7	7	3	3	20
Patriots	7	7	14	3	31

at Gillette Stadium, Foxboro, Massachusetts

- Date: January 12, 2008
- Game time: 8:00 p.m. EST
- Game weather: Cloudy and cool, 37 °F (3 °C)
- Game attendance: 68,756
- Referee: Jerome Boger
- TV announcers (CBS): Jim Nantz (play-by-play) and Phil Simms (color commentator)
- Recap, Game Book

Game information

First quarter

- JAX – Matt Jones 8-yard pass from David Garrard (Josh Scobee kick), 10:50. Jaguars 7–0. Drive: 9 plays, 80 yards, 4:10.
- NE – Benjamin Watson 3-yard pass from Tom Brady (Stephen Gostkowski kick), 5:01. Tied 7–7. Drive: 10 plays, 74 yards, 5:49.

Second quarter

- NE – Laurence Maroney 1-yard run (Stephen Gostkowski kick), 14:57. Patriots 14–7. Drive: 7 plays, 29 yards, 3:33.
- JAX – Ernest Wilford 6-yard pass from David Garrard (Josh Scobee kick), 7:46. Tied 14–14. Drive: 11 plays, 95 yards, 7:11.

Third quarter

- NE – Wes Welker 6-yard pass from Tom Brady (Stephen Gostkowski kick), 8:49. Patriots 21–14. Drive: 11 plays, 82 yards, 6:11.
- JAX – Josh Scobee 39-yard field goal, 4:04. Patriots 21–17. Drive: 9 plays, 48 yards, 4:45.
- NE – Ben Watson 9-yard pass from Tom Brady (Stephen Gostkowski kick), 0:49. Patriots 28–17. Drive: 6 plays, 76 yards, 3:15.

Fourth quarter

- JAX – Josh Scobee 25-yard field goal, 9:44. Patriots 28–20. Drive: 13 plays, 86 yards, 6:05.
- NE – Stephen Gostowski 35-yard field goal, 6:39. Patriots 31–20. Drive: 6 plays, 63 yards, 3:05.

Top passers

- JAX – David Garrard – 22/33, 278 yards, 2 TD, INT
- NE – Tom Brady – 26/28, 262 yards, 3 TD

Top rushers

- JAX – Fred Taylor – 13 rushes, 47 yards
- NE – Laurence Maroney – 22 rushes, 122 yards, TD

Top receivers

- JAX – Marcedes Lewis – 4 receptions, 74 yards
- NE – Donté Stallworth – 3 receptions, 68 yards

Patriots quarterback Tom Brady set the NFL record for completion percentage in a single game (92.9%) with 26 of 28 completions for 263 yards and 3 touchdowns, while running back Laurence Maroney added 162 total yards (122 on the ground). Overall, New England gained 401 yards and didn't punt the ball until 31 seconds remained in the fourth quarter.

Jacksonville took the opening kickoff and went 80 yards in 9 plays, featuring two receptions by Marcedes Lewis for 57 yards, on the way to David Garrard's 9-yard touchdown pass to Matt Jones. The Patriots then went on a 74-yard drive and scored with Tom Brady's 3-yard touchdown pass to Benjamin Watson. On Jacksonville's next possession, New England lineman Ty Warren forced a fumble while sacking Garrard, and linebacker Mike Vrabel recovered it at the Jaguars 29-yard line. Several plays later, Maroney scored a 1-yard touchdown run to give New England a 14–7 lead.

Jaguars running back Maurice Jones-Drew muffed the ensuing kickoff and was downed at his own 5-yard line. The Jaguars then moved the ball 95 yards in 11 plays without even facing a third down and scoring with Garrard's 6-yard touchdown pass to Ernest Wilford. For the third time in a row, New England drove deep into Jacksonville territory. But this time the drive stalled at the 17-yard line and ended with no points when Stephen Gostkowski missed a 35-yard field goal with 53 seconds left in the first half.

On the opening drive of the second half, Brady completed 7 of 8 passes for 54 yards on an 82-yard drive. On the last play, he took a snap in shotgun formation with Kevin Faulk to his right, Brady jumped in the air with his arms raised to make it look like a play used by the Patriots before where Faulk took the direct snap. The Jaguars defense followed Faulk, leaving Wes Welker open in the end zone, and Brady threw him the ball for a touchdown to give the Patriots a 21–14 lead. The play has been referred to as the "Statue of Liberty". Jacksonville responded with a drive to the New England 21-yard line, but receiver Dennis Northcutt dropped a pass on third down, forcing them to settle for a Josh Scobee 39-yard field goal, cutting the score to 21–17. On New England's next drive, Jacksonville's Derek Landri was assessed a roughing-the-passer penalty, turning Welker's 6-yard catch into a 21-yard gain. Maroney gained 40 yards with his next two carries, and following two more Welker receptions, Brady threw a 9-yard touchdown pass to Watson giving New England a 28–17 lead.

An unnecessary roughness penalty and a 25-yard reception by Reggie Williams on the Jacksonville's next drive set up a 25-yard field goal by Scobee, which cut the Jaguars deficit to one touchdown, 28–20. On the second play after the kickoff, Brady completed a 52-yard strike to Donté Stallworth, setting up Gostkowski's second field goal attempt to put New England back up by two scores, 31–20.

Then, with 3:46 left in the game, Patriots safety, Rodney Harrison, intercepted a pass from Garrard at the Patriots' 31-yard line, ending any hope of a Jacksonville comeback. Harrison's interception was his 7th career postseason pick, a Patriots record. This was also his fourth consecutive postseason game with an interception, tying an NFL record held by Aeneas Williams.

With this win, the Patriots advanced to the AFC title game for the second year in a row and extended their perfect record to 17–0, matching the final record of the 1972 Miami Dolphins. The Jaguars' overall record ended with a 12–6 and 1–1 in the playoffs.
