= Reggie Nelson =

American football player (born 1983)

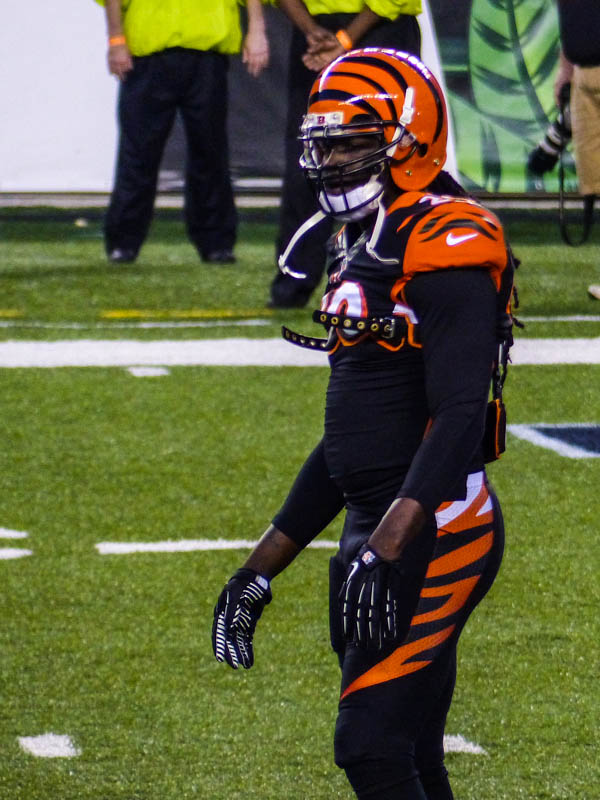
- Nelson with the Cincinnati Bengals in 2013

No. 25, 20, 27
- Position: Safety

Personal information
- Born: September 21, 1983 (age 43); Melbourne, Florida, U.S.
- Listed height: 5 ft 11 in (1.80 m)
- Listed weight: 210 lb (95 kg)

Career information
- High school: Palm Bay (Melbourne)
- College: Coffeyville (2003–2004); Florida (2005–2006)
- NFL draft: 2007: 1st round, 21st overall pick

Career history
- Jacksonville Jaguars (2007–2009); Cincinnati Bengals (2010–2015); Oakland Raiders (2016–2018)

Awards and highlights
- Second-team All-Pro (2015); 2× Pro Bowl (2015, 2016); NFL interceptions co-leader (2015); PFWA All-Rookie Team (2007); BCS National Championship (2007); Jack Tatum Trophy (2006); Consensus All-American (2006); First-team All-SEC (2006)

Career NFL statistics
- Total tackles: 832
- Sacks: 6.5
- Forced fumbles: 9
- Pass deflections: 101
- Interceptions: 38
- Defensive Touchdowns: 1
- Stats at Pro Football Reference

Reggie Lee Nelson (born September 21, 1983) is an American former professional football player who was a safety in the National Football League (NFL). He played college football for the Florida Gators, winning a national championship and earning consensus All-American honors. He was selected by the Jacksonville Jaguars in the first round of the 2007 NFL draft and also played for the Cincinnati Bengals and Oakland Raiders.

== Early life ==
Nelson was born in Melbourne, Florida in 1983. He attended Palm Bay High School in Melbourne, and was a standout high school football player for the Palm Bay Pirates. He was teammates with Joe Cohen and Xavier Carter. Nelson was a two-time first-team All-State honoree, and helped lead Palm Bay to win Florida Class 4A state championship as a safety and return specialist in 2002. As a senior, Nelson averaged forty-five yards per punt return and 26.8 yards per kickoff return, totaling a state record 1,531 return yards. In 2007, four years after he graduated from high school, the Florida High School Athletic Association (FHSAA) named Nelson to its "All-Century Team," recognizing him as one of the thirty-three greatest Florida high school football players of the last 100 years. He was taught how to play football by Rob Robbins.

== College career ==
After graduating from Palm Bay High School in 2003, Nelson and Pirates teammate Joe Cohen chose to attend the University of Florida over rival Florida State University. He attended Coffeyville Community College in Coffeyville, Kansas first, red-shirting his freshman year, and then earned his associate degree and transferred to Florida as a sophomore.

Nelson accepted an athletic scholarship to play for coach Urban Meyer's Florida Gators football team in 2005 and 2006. Nelson was an immediate sophomore starter for the Gators at free safety in 2005. Nelson started in four games, and registered forty-six tackles, with four sacks, and forced a fumble. Against Georgia, Nelson recorded a career-high seven tackles. He also totaled seven tackles against Vanderbilt and Florida State.

In his junior year, which would end up being his last season as a Gator, Nelson was selected as a member of the team's Leadership Committee, which was only one small highlight of his 2006 campaign. The Gators ended up going to the BCS National Championship Game and defeated the Ohio State Buckeyes, while Nelson recorded fifty-one tackles, five pass breakups and six interceptions. Two of his interceptions were against the Tennessee Volunteers, and he returned another for a seventy-yard touchdown against the Alabama Crimson Tide. Nelson was a first-team All-SEC selection and a consensus first-team All-American, and he was chosen by his Gators teammates as the team's most valuable player.

In 2006, he was part a defense that helped the Gators win their first SEC title in six years and their first national championship in ten years. While also gaining him the moniker "The Eraser" for his strong defensive play throughout the season as well as the "battle for the SEC" game against LSU.

== Professional career ==
Pre-draft measurables
Height	Weight	Arm length	Hand span	40-yard dash	10-yard split	20-yard split	20-yard shuttle	Three-cone drill	Vertical jump	Broad jump
5 ft 11 3/8 in (1.81 m)	198 lb (90 kg)	33 1/4 in (0.84 m)	8 7/8 in (0.23 m)	4.56 s	1.62 s	2.68 s	4.15 s	6.67 s	34.5 in (0.88 m)	10 ft 6 in (3.20 m)
All values from NFL Combine/Florida's Pro Day

=== Jacksonville Jaguars ===
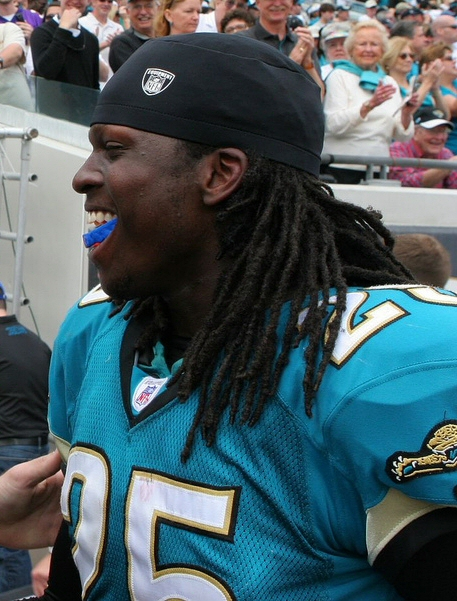
Nelson in 2007

==== 2007 ====
The Jacksonville Jaguars selected Nelson in the first round (21st overall) of the 2007 NFL draft. He was the third safety selected, following LaRon Landry (6th overall) and Michael Griffin (19th overall), and was the first of two safeties selected by the Jaguars in 2007, along with fifth-round pick (150th overall) Josh Gattis. He became the highest drafted defensive back in the history of the Jaguars, surpassing (1997) first-round pick (25th overall) Donovin Darius. The Jaguars selected Nelson following the departure of Deon Grant and the after Donovin Darius broke his leg the previous season. On July 28, 2007, the Jaguars signed Nelson to a five–year, $9.55 million contract that includes $7.20 million guaranteed and a signing bonus of $5.04 million.

He entered training camp slated as the starting free safety after the departure of Deon Grant in free agency. On July 5, 2007, the Jaguars surprisedly cut their long-time starting strong safety Donovin Darius. Head coach Jack Del Rio officially named Nelson the starting free safety to begin the regular season, along with strong safety Gerald Sensabaugh.

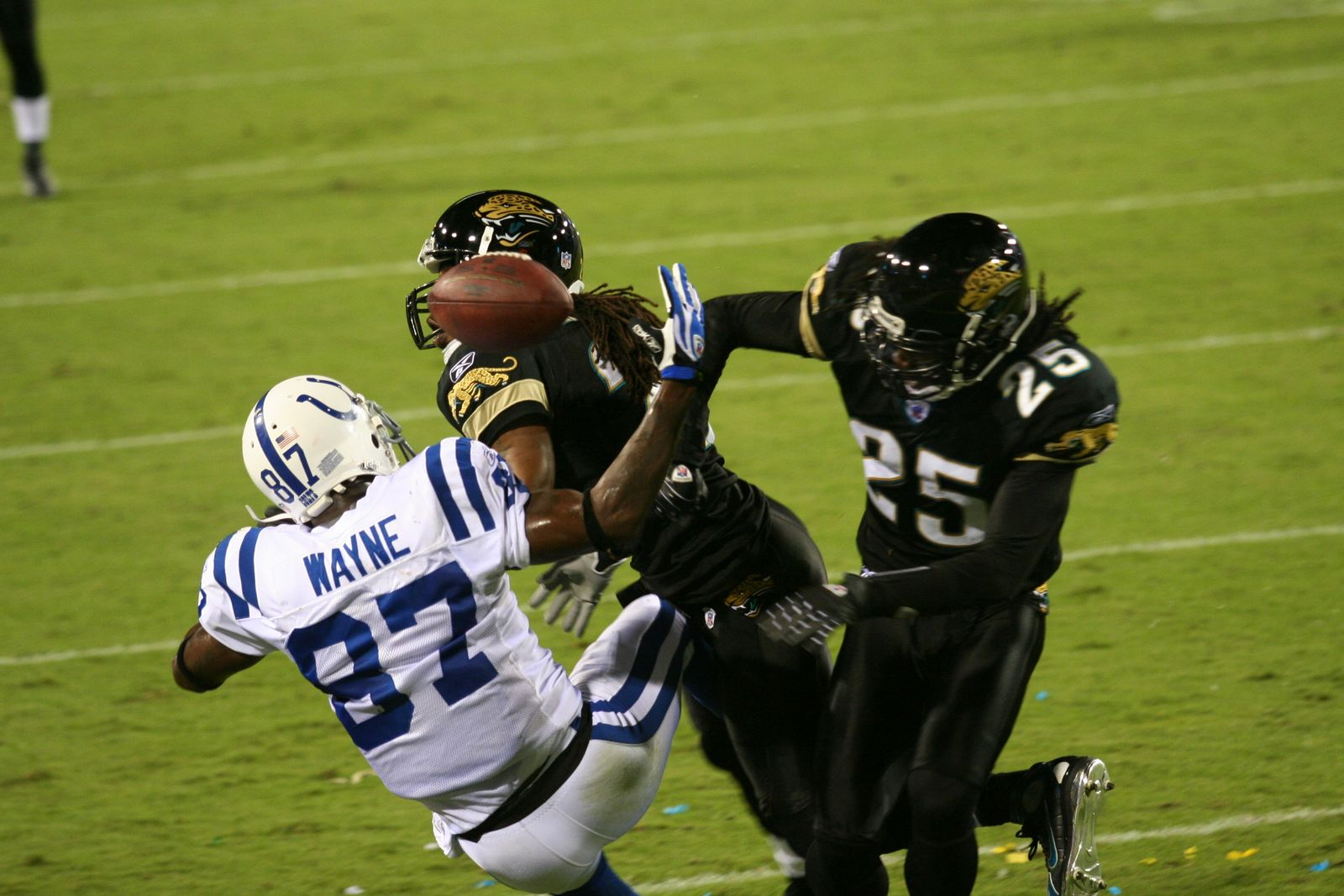
Nelson hitting Reggie Wayne of the Indianapolis Colts in 2007.

He made his professional regular season debut and first career start in the Jacksonville Jaguars' season-opener against Tennessee Titans and collected seven combined tackles and made his first career sack on quarterback Vince Young during the Titans' 13–10 loss. On October 7, 2007, Nelson recorded a tackle, a pass deflection, and made his first career interception off a pass by quarterback Damon Huard during a 17–7 win at the Jacksonville Jaguars in Week 5. In Week 8, he made eight solo tackles, deflected a pass, and intercepted a pass by Jeff Garcia during a 24–23 victory at the Tampa Bay Buccaneers. The following week Nelson recorded a season-high ten solo tackles in the Jaguars' 41–24 loss at the New Orleans Saints in Week 9. He finished his rookie season with 63 combined tackles (58 solo), 11 pass deflections, five interceptions, and a forced fumble in 16 games and 15 starts. He received an overall grade of 73.2 from Pro Football Focus in 2007.

The Jacksonville Jaguars finished second in the AFC South with a 13–3 record and received a wildcard berth. On January 5, 2008, Nelson started in his first career playoff game and made three solo tackles in the Jaguars' 31–29 victory at the Pittsburgh Steelers in the AFC Wildcard Game. The following week, he recorded six combined tackles as the Jaguars lost 31–20 at the New England Patriots in the AFC Divisional Round.

==== 2008 ====
The Jacksonville Jaguars hired Gregg Williams to be their new defensive coordinator after Mike Smith accepted the head coaching role with the Atlanta Falcons. Head coach Jack Del Rio named Nelson the starting free safety to begin the regular season, opposite strong safety Brian Williams.

Nelson sustained a knee injury and was inactive for three games (Weeks 4–6). On November 23, 2008, Nelson collected a season-high seven combined tackles during a 30–12 loss to the Minnesota Vikings in Week 12. In Week 16, he tied his season-high of seven combined tackles and broke up a pass in the Jaguars' 31–24 loss to the Indianapolis Colts. He finished the 2008 season with 54 combined tackles (48 solo), four pass deflections, and two interceptions in 13 games and 13 starts. He earned an overall grade of 47.6 in 2008, marking the lowest grade throughout his career.

==== 2009 ====
Defensive coordinator Mel Tucker retained Nelson as the starting free safety after former defensive coordinator Gregg Williams departed for the New Orleans Saints. In Week 8, Nelson recorded a season-high seven solo tackles during a 30–13 loss at the Tennessee Titans. In Week 15, Nelson had a disappointing performance and was demoted to being a backup for the rest of the season (Weeks 16–17) as Anthony Smith started in his place. Nelson finished the 2009 season with 70 combined tackles (64 solo) in 16 games and 14 starts. Pro Football Focus gave him an overall grade of 51.8 in 2009.

Throughout training camp in 2010, Nelson competed for a role as a starting safety against Anthony Smith, Gerald Alexander, and Sean Considine.

=== Cincinnati Bengals ===
==== 2010 ====
On September 4, 2010, the Jaguars traded Nelson to the Cincinnati Bengals in exchange for cornerback David Jones and a conditional draft pick. Head coach Marvin Lewis named Nelson the backup free safety, behind Chris Crocker, to start the regular season.

On October 31, 2010, Nelson earned his first start with the Bengals after Roy Williams and Chinedum Ndukwe were listed as inactive due to knee injuries. He recorded six combined tackles in the Bengals' 22–14 loss to the Miami Dolphins in Week 8. On November 22, 2010, Nelson became the starting free safety after the Cincinnati Bengals placed Chris Crocker on injured reserve for the remainder of the season due to a torn ACL. In Week 13, Nelson recorded three combined tackles, a pass deflection, and intercepted a pass by Drew Brees during a 34–30 loss to the New Orleans Saints. On December 26, 2010, Nelson collected a season-high eight combined tackles and a pass deflection in the Bengals' 34–20 victory against the San Diego Chargers in Week 16. Nelson finished his first season with the Cincinnati Bengals with 54 combined tackles (34 solo), seven pass deflections, and two interceptions in 16 games and six starts. He received an overall grade of 72.0 from Pro Football Focus in 2010.

==== 2011 ====
Nelson entered training camp slated as the starting strong safety. Defensive coordinator Mike Zimmer officially named him the starter to begin the regular season, alongside free safety Chris Crocker.

He started in the Cincinnati Bengals' season-opener at the Cleveland Browns and recorded nine combined tackles, two pass deflections, and a sack in their 27–17 victory. On September 25, 2011, Nelson collected a season-high ten combined tackles (seven solo) during a 13–8 loss to the San Francisco 49ers in Week 3. In Week 8, Nelson recorded five solo tackles, two pass deflections, and returned an interception for his first career touchdown in the Bengals' 34–12 victory at the Seattle Seahawks. He intercepted a pass by quarterback Tarvaris Jackson that was originally intended for wide receiver Kris Durham and returned it for a 75-yard touchdown with 49 seconds left in the fourth quarter. On December 24, 2011, he made seven combined tackles, a pass deflection, a sack, and an interception in the Bengals' 23–16 win against the Arizona Cardinals in Week 16. Nelson finished the 2011 season with 85 combined tackles (59 solo), 12 pass deflections, four interceptions, two sacks, two forced fumbles, and a touchdown in 16 games and 16 starts. Pro Football Focus gave Nelson an overall grade of 79.9 in 2011.

The Cincinnati Bengals finished third in the AFC North with a 9–7 record and received a wildcard berth. On January 7, 2012, Nelson collected six combined tackles and sacked quarterback T. J. Yates during a 31–10 loss at the Houston Texans in the AFC Wildcard Game.

==== 2012 ====
Nelson became an unrestricted free agent following the 2012 season and was widely considered to be the top free agent safety by many analysts. He reportedly received interest from three teams, including the Cincinnati Bengals and New York Jets. On May 16, 2012, Nelson attended a two-day private visit with the New York Jets and received a contract offer. He ultimately declined their offer and chose to accept a similar contract offer by the Bengals.

On March 19, 2012, the Cincinnati Bengals signed Nelson to a four-year, $18 million contract that includes $6 million guaranteed and a signing bonus of $2.5 million.

Head coach Marvin Lewis officially named Nelson the starting free safety to start the 2012 regular season, opposite strong safety Taylor Mays. In Week 3, he collected a season-high ten combined tackles (seven solo) during a 38–31 victory at the Washington Redskins. On October 7, 2012, Nelson tied his season-high of ten combined tackles (five solo) in the Bengals 17–13 loss to the Miami Dolphins in Week 5. In Week 9, Nelson made five combined tackles and broke up a pass before exiting the Bengals' 31–23 loss to the Denver Broncos in the third quarter after injuring his hamstring. He was sidelined for the next two games due to the injury (Weeks 10–11). He completed the 2012 season with 85 combined tackles (56 solo), nine pass deflections, three interceptions, two forced fumbles, and a sack in 14 games and 14 starts. Nelson received an overall grade of 88.1 from Pro Football Focus in 2012.

The Cincinnati Bengals finished second in the AFC North with a 10–6 record. On January 6, 2013, Nelson started in the AFC Wildcard Game and recorded ten combined tackles (nine solo) in the Bengals' 19–13 loss at the Houston Texans.

==== 2013 ====
Defensive coordinator Mike Zimmer retained Nelson as the starting free safety to begin the season, alongside strong safety George Iloka. Nelson was inactive for the Bengals' Week 4 loss at the Cleveland Browns after injuring his hamstring the previous week. On November 17, 2013, Nelson collected a season-high nine combined tackles, two pass deflections, and an interception during a 41–20 win against the Cleveland Browns. He finished the season with 65 combined tackles (49 solo), seven pass deflections, two interceptions, a forced fumble, and a sack in 15 games and 15 starts. The Cincinnati Bengals finished atop the AFC North with an 11–5 record, but were eliminated from the playoffs after a 27–10 loss to the San Diego Chargers in the AFC Wildcard Game. Nelson earned an overall grade of 82.3 from Pro Football Focus in 2013.

==== 2014 ====
The Cincinnati Bengals hired Paul Guenther as their new defensive coordinator after Mike Zimmer accepted the head coaching position with the Minnesota Vikings. Guenther opted to retain Nelson and Iloka as the starting safeties to start the 2014 season. On October 12, 2014, Nelson recorded a season-high 11 combined tackles (nine solo), two pass deflections, and intercepted a pass attempt by quarterback Cam Newton as the Bengals and Carolina Panthers tied 37–37 in Week 6. In Week 17, he made three solo tackles, two pass deflections, and an interception during a 27–17 loss at the Pittsburgh Steelers. Nelson completed the 2014 season with a career-high 95 combined tackles (62 solo), 13 pass deflections, four interceptions, and 1.5 sacks in 16 games and 16 starts. He received an overall grade of 82.7 from Pro Football Focus in 2014.

==== 2015 ====
On October 18, 2015, Nelson recorded a season-high 12 combined tackles (eight solo) and broke up a pass during a 34–21 win at the Buffalo Bills in Week 6. On November 1, 2015, Nelson collected five solo tackles, two pass deflections, and intercepted two pass attempts by quarterback Ben Roethlisberger in the Bengals' 16–10 win at the Pittsburgh Steelers in Week 8. The two interceptions marked the first multi-interception game of Nelson's career. In Week 10, he made seven combined tackles, two pass deflections, and an interception in the Bengals' 10–6 loss at the Houston Texans. His interception off quarterback Brian Hoyer began his five-game interception streak. On December 13, 2015, he collected three combined tackles, broke up a pass, and made an interception in a 33–20 loss to the Pittsburgh Steelers in Week 14. The interception extended his interception streak to five games in-a-row. On December 24, 2015, it was announced that Nelson was voted to the 2016 Pro Bowl, marking the first Pro Bowl selection of his career. Nelson started in 16 games in 2015 and recorded 77 combined tackles (52 solo), 14 passes defensed, and a career-high eight interceptions. Nelson and Kansas City Chiefs' cornerback Marcus Peters led the league with eight interceptions in 2015. He also earned an overall grade of 84.2 from Pro Football Focus and was ranked 13th among qualifying safeties in 2016.

The Cincinnati Bengals completed the season on top of their division with a 12–4 record. On January 9, 2016, Nelson started in the AFC Wildcard Game and recorded three combined tackles and a sack before exiting in the third quarter of the Bengals' 18–16 loss to the Pittsburgh Steelers with an ankle injury. His ankle injury also sidelined him for the Pro Bowl and was replaced by Miami Dolphins' safety Reshad Jones.

Nelson became an unrestricted free agent after 2015 and was one of the top free agent safeties in the market. He received a two-year contract offer from the Cincinnati Bengals, but chose to decline it in hopes of receiving a three or four-year deal. At age 33, the Bengals declined to pursue a long-term contract extending beyond two years and ended contract negotiations. Nelson also received interest from the Minnesota Vikings and Oakland Raiders. Vikings' head coach Mike Zimmer coached Nelson as the Bengals' defensive coordinator for five seasons.

=== Oakland Raiders ===
==== 2016 ====
On April 7, 2016, the Oakland Raiders signed Nelson to a two-year, $8.50 million contract with $4 million guaranteed. The signing reunited Nelson with Oakland Raiders' head coach Jack Del Rio who previously was his head coach for the first three seasons of his career.

Head coach Jack Del Rio named Nelson the starting free safety to start the regular season, opposite starting strong safety Karl Joseph. In Week 2, Nelson collected a season-high 12 combined tackles (ten solo) during a 35–28 loss to the Atlanta Falcons. The following week, Nelson collected six combined tackles, two pass deflections, and made his first interception as a member of the Oakland Raiders during their 17–10 win at the Tennessee Titans in Week 3. On December 20, 2016, it was announced that Nelson was voted to the 2017 Pro Bowl, marking his second consecutive selection. He started in 16 games in his first season with the Oakland Raiders and recorded 65 combined tackles (50 solo), 12 pass deflections, and five interceptions. He received an overall grade of 81.5 from Pro Football Focus in 2016.

The Oakland Raiders finished second in the AFC West with a 12–4 record. On January 7, 2017, Nelson started in the AFC Wildcard game at the Houston Texans and recorded five solo tackles during their 27–14 loss.

==== 2017 ====
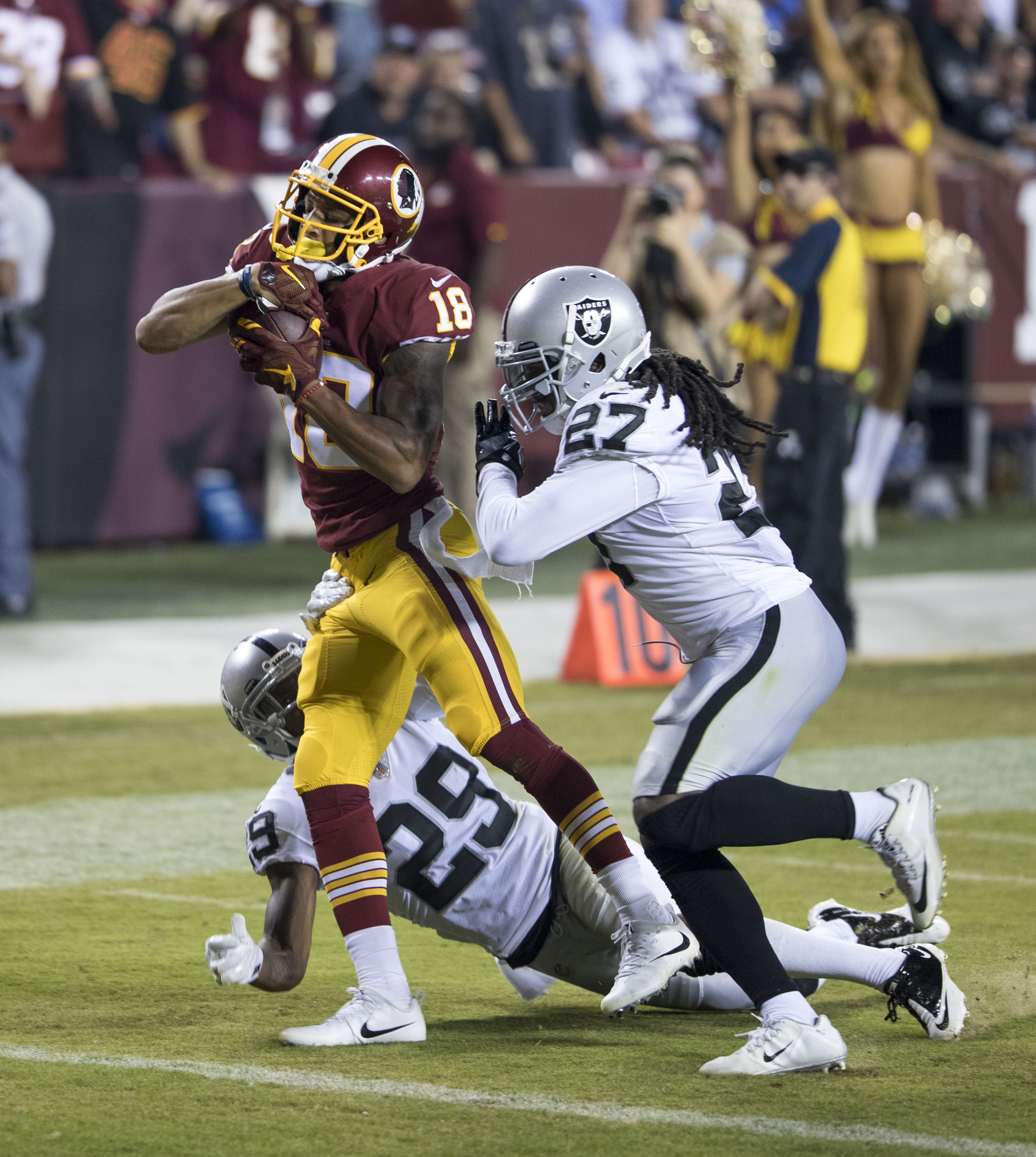
Josh Doctson scoring his first career touchdown against the Oakland Raiders with cornerback David Amerson and safety Reggie Nelson covering him.

He started in the Oakland Raiders' season-opener at the Tennessee Titans and recorded a season-high eight combined tackles and a pass deflection in their 26–16 victory. The following week, he tied his season-high of eight combined tackles during a 45–20 victory against the New York Jets in Week 2. On December 25, 2017, Nelson recorded six solo tackles, a season-high three pass deflections, and an interception in the Raiders' 19–10 loss at the Philadelphia Eagles in Week 16. He finished the season with 89 combined tackles (60 solo), five passes defended, one interception, and two forced fumbles in 16 games and 16 starts. On December 31, 2017, the Oakland Raiders fired head coach Jack Del Rio after they finished with a 6–10 record. Pro Football Focus gave Nelson an overall grade of 75.3, which ranked him the 56th among all qualifying safeties in 2017.

==== 2018 ====
On March 24, 2018, the Oakland Raiders signed Nelson to a one-year, $2.50 million contract with $1.15 million guaranteed. He played in 11 games before being placed on injured reserve on December 5, 2018, with a shoulder injury.

== NFL career statistics ==
Legend
	Led the league
**Bold**	Career high

=== Regular season ===
Year	Team	Games		Tackles					Interceptions					Fumbles			
Year	Team	GP	GS	Cmb	Solo	Ast	Sck	TFL	Int	Yds	TD	Lng	PD	FF	FR	Yds	TD
2007	JAX	**16**	15	62	57	5	1.0	1	5	76	0	37	11	**2**	0	0	0
2008	JAX	13	13	55	49	6	0.0	0	2	0	0	0	4	0	0	0	0
2009	JAX	**16**	14	70	**64**	6	0.0	1	0	0	0	0	5	0	1	0	0
2010	CIN	**16**	6	55	35	20	0.0	0	2	63	0	56	7	1	0	0	0
2011	CIN	**16**	**16**	85	59	26	**2.0**	4	4	**115**	**1**	**75**	12	**2**	0	0	0
2012	CIN	14	14	85	56	29	1.0	**6**	3	10	0	10	9	1	0	0	0
2013	CIN	15	15	65	49	16	1.0	4	2	0	0	0	7	1	**2**	12	0
2014	CIN	**16**	**16**	**95**	62	**33**	1.5	5	4	30	0	31	13	0	0	0	0
2015	CIN	**16**	**16**	77	52	25	0.0	2	**8**	**115**	0	37	**14**	0	**2**	**25**	0
2016	OAK	**16**	**16**	65	50	15	0.0	0	5	74	0	40	12	0	1	0	0
2017	OAK	**16**	**16**	89	60	29	0.0	1	1	3	0	3	5	**2**	0	0	0
2018	OAK	11	7	29	25	4	0.0	0	2	0	0	0	2	0	0	0	0
		181	164	832	618	214	6.5	24	38	486	1	75	101	9	6	37	0

=== Playoffs ===
Year	Team	Games		Tackles					Interceptions					Fumbles			
Year	Team	GP	GS	Cmb	Solo	Ast	Sck	TFL	Int	Yds	TD	Lng	PD	FF	FR	Yds	TD
2007	JAX	**2**	**2**	9	7	**2**	0.0	0	0	0	0	0	0	0	0	0	0
2011	CIN	1	1	6	5	1	**1.0**	1	0	0	0	0	0	0	0	0	0
2012	CIN	1	1	**10**	**9**	1	0.0	**2**	0	0	0	0	0	0	0	0	0
2013	CIN	1	1	4	4	0	0.0	0	0	0	0	0	0	0	0	0	0
2014	CIN	1	1	5	4	1	0.0	0	0	0	0	0	0	0	**1**	**6**	0
2015	CIN	1	1	3	3	0	**1.0**	1	0	0	0	0	0	0	0	0	0
2016	OAK	1	1	5	5	0	0.0	0	0	0	0	0	0	0	0	0	0
		8	8	42	37	5	2.0	4	0	0	0	0	0	0	1	6	0

== Personal life ==
Nelson's sister, Lynisha, is a hall of fame basketball player for the Florida Tech Panthers. Nelson's mother, Mary Lakes, who had breast cancer for several years, died on December 21, 2006, weeks before the 2007 BCS National Championship Game. As a result, Nelson was excused from participating in the daily media briefings leading up to the game.

=== 2007 Gainesville shooting ===
On September 30, 2007, a car driven by Justin Glass with passengers Corey Smith and Randall Cason was approached by two individuals one of whom opened fire on the car. Smith received a gunshot wound to the back of his head and was in a coma for two days while Glass was shot in the arm. Cason who was unhurt in the incident initially identified Reggie Nelson as the man accompanying the shooter, identified as Aaron Hernandez. Cason later rescinded his identification of Aaron Hernandez as the shooter and Reggie Nelson as the accomplice. No charges from this incident were ever brought against either Hernandez or Nelson.

== See also ==
- 2006 College Football All-America Team
- 2006 Florida Gators football team
- History of the Cincinnati Bengals
- List of Florida Gators football All-Americans
- List of Florida Gators in the NFL draft
- List of Jacksonville Jaguars first-round draft picks
