= Derek Landri =

American football player (born 1983)

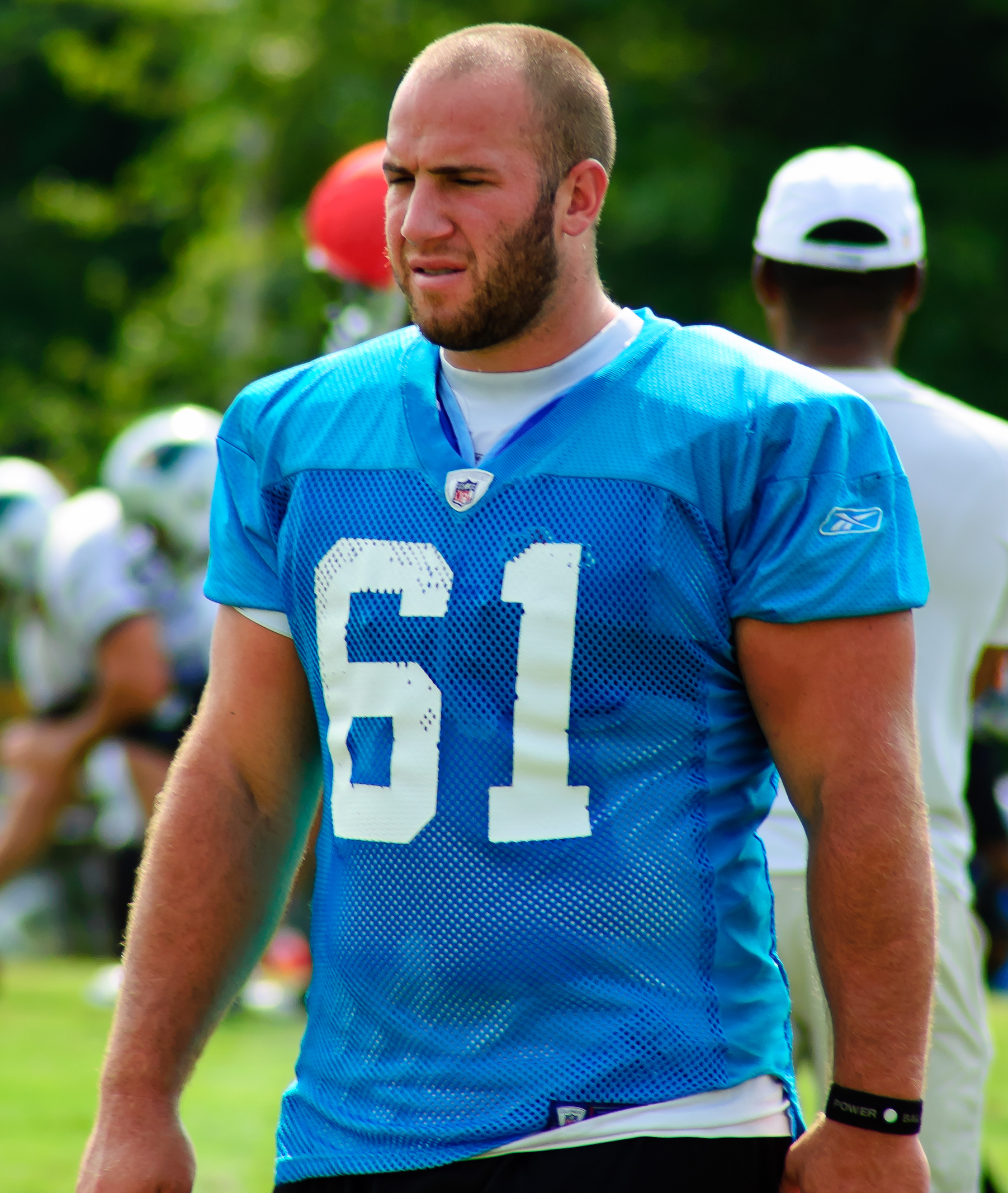
- Landri with the Carolina Panthers in 2010

No. 66, 61, 73, 94, 90, 77
- Position: Defensive lineman

Personal information
- Born: September 21, 1983 (age 43); Newport Beach, California, U.S.
- Listed height: 6 ft 2 in (1.88 m)
- Listed weight: 295 lb (134 kg)

Career information
- High school: De La Salle (Concord, California)
- College: Notre Dame
- NFL draft: 2007: 5th round, 166th overall pick

Career history
- Jacksonville Jaguars (2007–2009); Carolina Panthers (2009–2010); Philadelphia Eagles (2011–2012); Tampa Bay Buccaneers (2013)

Career NFL statistics
- Total tackles: 130
- Sacks: 9
- Fumble recoveries: 2
- Stats at Pro Football Reference

Derek Landri (born September 21, 1983) is an American former professional football player who was a defensive lineman in the National Football League (NFL). He played college football for the Notre Dame Fighting Irish and was selected by the Jacksonville Jaguars in the fifth round of the 2007 NFL draft.

Landri also played for the Carolina Panthers, Philadelphia Eagles and Tampa Bay Buccaneers.

== Early life ==
Named Mr. California for the highest award for California high school players, Landri played high school football for De La Salle where he was Maurice Jones-Drew's teammate.

== Professional career ==
=== Jacksonville Jaguars ===
Landri's selection by the Jacksonville Jaguars in the fifth round (166th overall) was rated one of the "Top 10 Draft Steals" of the 2007 draft by Sports Illustrated.

Playing in a reserve role, Landri recorded a sack and an interception on Pittsburgh Steelers quarterback Ben Roethlisberger during the Jaguars' Wildcard playoff game on January 5, 2008. He also recovered a fumble which sealed the Jaguars' win. On December 3, 2009, Landri was waived by the Jaguars.

=== Carolina Panthers ===
Landri was claimed off waivers by the Carolina Panthers on December 4, 2009. He became an unrestricted free agent following the 2010 season.

=== Philadelphia Eagles ===
The Philadelphia Eagles signed Landri on August 3, 2011. He was released on September 3 during final roster cuts. Following a season-ending injury to Antonio Dixon, Landri was re-signed on October 3. Following the 2011 season, Landri became an unrestricted free agent, but was re-signed to a one-year contract on April 9, 2012.

=== Tampa Bay Buccaneers ===
Landri signed a two-year, $3.25 million contract with the Tampa Bay Buccaneers on March 30, 2013. He was released on February 10, 2014.

== NFL career statistics ==
Legend
**Bold**	Career high

=== Regular season ===
Year	Team	Games		Tackles					Interceptions					Fumbles			
Year	Team	GP	GS	Cmb	Solo	Ast	Sck	TFL	Int	Yds	TD	Lng	PD	FF	FR	Yds	TD
2007	JAX	13	0	11	10	1	0.0	2	0	0	0	0	0	0	0	0	0
2008	JAX	15	0	15	11	4	2.0	6	0	0	0	0	1	0	0	0	0
2009	JAX	7	0	13	9	4	1.0	1	0	0	0	0	0	0	0	0	0
2010	CAR	**16**	**16**	**43**	**30**	**13**	**3.0**	**10**	0	0	0	0	1	0	**1**	0	0
2011	PHI	12	0	21	17	4	2.0	8	0	0	0	0	1	0	**1**	**5**	0
2012	PHI	**16**	7	18	13	5	0.0	5	0	0	0	0	**3**	0	0	0	0
2013	TAM	9	1	9	6	3	1.0	1	0	0	0	0	0	0	0	0	0
		88	24	130	96	34	9.0	33	0	0	0	0	6	0	2	5	0

=== Playoffs ===
Year	Team	Games		Tackles					Interceptions					Fumbles			
Year	Team	GP	GS	Cmb	Solo	Ast	Sck	TFL	Int	Yds	TD	Lng	PD	FF	FR	Yds	TD
2007	JAX	**2**	0	**2**	**1**	**1**	**1.0**	**1**	**1**	**3**	0	**3**	**1**	0	**1**	0	0
		2	0	2	1	1	1.0	1	1	3	0	3	1	0	1	0	0
