= Jamall Broussard =

American gridiron football player (born 1981)

No. 85, 13
- Position: Wide receiver

Personal information
- Born: August 19, 1981 (age 45); Nederland, Texas, U.S.
- Listed height: 5 ft 9 in (1.75 m)
- Listed weight: 175 lb (79 kg)

Career information
- High school: Kingwood (Kingwood, Texas)
- College: San Jose State
- NFL draft: 2004: undrafted

Career history
- Cincinnati Bengals (2004)*; Carolina Panthers (2004); Cincinnati Bengals (2005)*; → Cologne Centurions (2006); Miami Dolphins (2006)*; Houston Texans (2006)*; Toronto Argonauts (2007); Philadelphia Soul (2008); San Jose SaberCats (2008)
- * Offseason or practice squad member only
- Stats at Pro Football Reference

Phillip Jamall Broussard (born August 19, 1981) is an American former professional football player who was a wide receiver in the National Football League (NFL). He played college football for the Texas Tech Red Raiders, College of the Canyons, and San Jose State Spartans.

He is the older brother of NFL wide receiver John Broussard.

== Early life and college ==
Broussard graduated from Kingwood High School at Houston, Texas, in 1999 then attended Naval Academy Preparatory School for one year before enrolling at Texas Tech University. During his freshman year with the Texas Tech Red Raiders, Broussard rushed for 56 yards and an average 5.6 yards per carry. Coaches remarked that Broussard as a walk-on player rather than recruit had shown much surprise and promise. In 2001, Broussard transferred to the College of the Canyons and signed with San Jose State University the following season.

== Professional career ==
After the 2004 NFL draft, Broussard signed as a free agent with the Cincinnati Bengals on April 27, 2004. On October 14, 2004, the Carolina Panthers signed Broussard. Broussard played in eight games with the Carolina Panthers in 2004. In each of two games, Broussard lost a fumble. In 2005, the Panthers moved Broussard to the practice squad, and Broussard signed with the Miami Dolphins on June 29, 2006.
