= Dennis Northcutt =

American football player (born 1977)

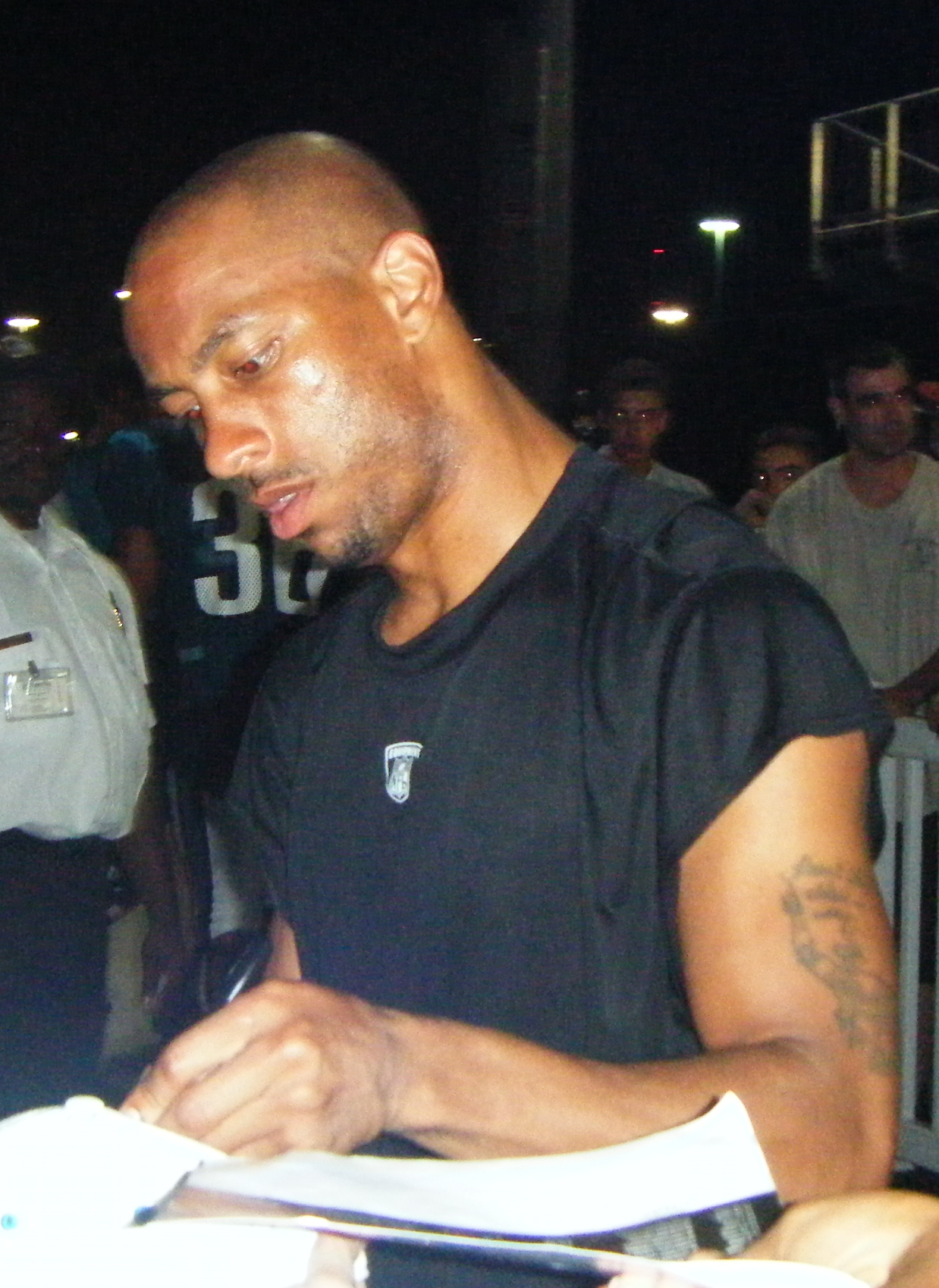
- Northcutt with the Jacksonville Jaguars

No. 86
- Position: Wide receiver

Personal information
- Born: December 22, 1977 (age 48); Los Angeles, California, U.S.
- Listed height: 5 ft 11 in (1.80 m)
- Listed weight: 172 lb (78 kg)

Career information
- High school: Dorsey (Los Angeles)
- College: Arizona
- NFL draft: 2000: 2nd round, 32nd overall pick

Career history
- Cleveland Browns (2000–2006); Jacksonville Jaguars (2007–2008); Detroit Lions (2009)

Awards and highlights
- Consensus All-American (1999); First-team All-Pac-10 (1999); NFL leader: punt returns for touchdowns (2002)

Career NFL statistics
- Receptions: 399
- Receiving yards: 4,941
- Receiving touchdowns: 18
- Rushing yards: 366
- Rushing touchdowns: 1
- Return yards: 2,684
- Return touchdowns: 3
- Stats at Pro Football Reference

Dennis LaMont Northcutt (born December 22, 1977) is an American former professional football player who was a wide receiver and punt returner for 10 seasons in the National Football League (NFL). He played college football for the Arizona Wildcats, earning consensus All-American honors and setting team career receiving records. A second-round pick in the 2000 NFL draft, he played professionally for the Cleveland Browns, Jacksonville Jaguars and Detroit Lions of the NFL.

== Early life ==
Northcutt was born in Los Angeles, California. He attended Washington High School in Los Angeles, then transferred to Dorsey High School in Los Angeles, California, and was a student and a letterman in football and track helping the Dons win the CIF LA 4-A CITY Football Championship. In football, as a senior, he was named the City Player of the Year, and made 74 rushing attempts for 900 yards (12.16 yards per rushing attempt avg.) and 23 touchdowns.

== College career ==
He attended the University of Arizona, where he played for the Arizona Wildcats football team from 1996 to 1999. He earned recognition as one of the best receivers and returners in Wildcats history, catching 223 passes for 3,252 yards. Only two other Pac-10 players have had more receptions and receiving yards in their careers. Northcutt also caught passes in 43 straight games, a conference record. In his senior year, he set an Arizona records with 88 receptions for 1,422 yards. His punt-return average that year of 19 yards per return was second in the nation. As a senior in 1999, he was recognized a consensus first-team All-American as an "all-purpose" athlete.

== Professional career ==
=== 2000 NFL Combine ===
Pre-draft measurables
Height	Weight	Arm length	Hand span	40-yard dash	10-yard split	20-yard split	20-yard shuttle	Three-cone drill	Vertical jump	Broad jump
5 ft 10 3/8 in (1.79 m)	175 lb (79 kg)	29 in (0.74 m)	10 1/8 in (0.26 m)	4.44 s	1.52 s	2.59 s	4.04 s	6.96 s	37.5 in (0.95 m)	10 ft 3 in (3.12 m)
All values from NFL Combine

The Cleveland Browns chose Northcutt in the second round of the 2000 NFL draft. After a good rookie season and an injury-plagued second one, he established himself as one of the team's most important weapons in 2002. He led the team that year with eight touchdowns, including two on punt returns, and finished third in the league with a 14.7 yard punt return average. According to Football Outsiders, Northcutt's 2002 season is the most efficient season, play-for-play, of any wide receiver from 1991 to 2011, even though Northcutt caught a modest 38 passes. Despite his efficiency, Northcutt's 2002 season is most memorable for a critical drop on third down in the Browns playoff matchup against the rival Pittsburgh Steelers.

In 2003, Northcutt led the Browns with 62 receptions, and in 2004, he led the Browns with 55 receptions. Northcutt left the Browns as the 10th best receiver in Browns history with 276 catches for 3,438 yards and 9 touchdowns. He was a good punt returner for the Browns, finishing his stint there with 202 returns for 2,149 yards. Three of his returns went for touchdowns, though seven were called back due to penalties. He holds the record for most punt return yardage in Browns history.

On March 4, 2007, Northcutt signed a five-year, $17 million deal with the Jacksonville Jaguars as an unrestricted free agent. Signing with a different team gave him the opportunity to start out fresh. He quickly rose to the top of the WR depth chart in his first season with the team. During his first year on the team, he placed second on the team in both receptions and yards receiving, and finished tied for second on the team in touchdown receptions. He also served as an occasional punt returner during the season.

On June 26, 2009, he was traded to the Detroit Lions in exchange for safety Gerald Alexander. Northcutt played in all 16 games of the 2009 season for the Lions, starting in two games. On September 5, 2010, Northcutt was waived in the Lions' final cuts before the start of the regular season. He has since joined a recreational flag football league at the North Ave turf fields.

== NFL statistics ==
=== Regular season ===
Year	Team	GP	Receiving						Rushing						Punt returns					Kickoff returns			
Year	Team	GP	Rec	Yds	Avg	Lng	TD	FD	Att	Yds	Avg	Lng	TD	FD	Ret	Yds	Lng	TD	FC	Ret	Yds	Lng	TD
2000	CLE	15	39	422	10.8	37	0	24	9	33	3.7	13	0	1	27	289	30	0	12	0	0	0	0
2001	CLE	11	18	211	11.7	26	0	7	3	26	8.7	12	0	1	15	86	32	0	9	1	26	26	0
2002	CLE	13	38	601	15.8	43	5	31	8	104	13.0	36	1	4	25	367	87	2	10	0	0	0	0
2003	CLE	15	62	729	11.8	44	2	43	12	83	6.9	23	0	4	36	295	38	0	10	0	0	0	0
2004	CLE	16	55	806	14.7	58	2	25	8	19	2.4	8	0	1	36	432	44	0	12	0	0	0	0
2005	CLE	16	42	441	10.5	58	2	19	2	33	16.5	31	0	1	35	368	62	1	13	0	0	0	0
2006	CLE	13	22	228	10.4	43	0	10	3	32	10.7	16	0	1	28	312	81	0	13	0	0	0	0
2007	JAX	15	44	601	13.7	55	4	30	6	27	4.5	8	0	0	26	240	37	0	13	0	0	0	0
2008	JAX	14	44	545	12.4	41	2	25	1	9	9.0	9	0	0	5	14	9	0	7	0	0	0	0
2009	DET	16	35	357	10.2	47	1	18	—	—	—	—	—	—	22	189	43	0	15	3	66	34	0
Career		144	399	4,941	12.4	58	18	232	52	366	7.0	36	1	13	255	2,592	87	3	114	4	92	34	0

=== Postseason ===
Year	Team	GP	Receiving						Rushing						Punt returns				
Year	Team	GP	Rec	Yds	Avg	Lng	TD	FD	Att	Yds	Avg	Lng	TD	FD	Ret	Yds	Lng	TD	FC
2002	CLE	1	6	92	15.3	32	2	6	1	5	5.0	5	0	0	2	70	59	0	4
2007	JAX	2	5	59	11.8	19	0	3	—	—	—	—	—	—	3	31	16	0	0
Career		3	11	151	13.7	32	2	9	1	5	5.0	5	0	0	5	101	59	0	4
