= Reggie Williams (wide receiver) =

American gridiron football player (born 1983)

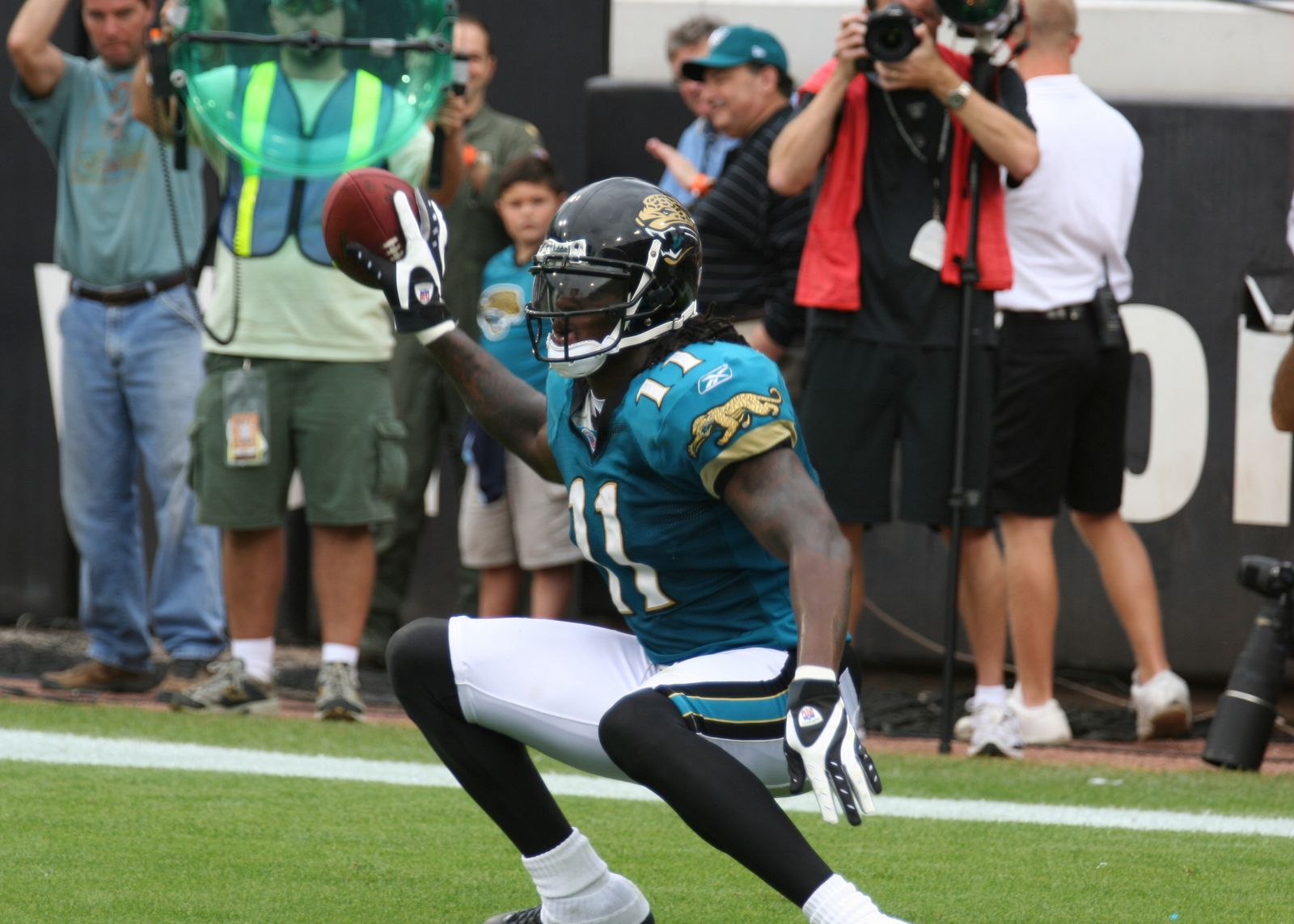
- Williams with the Jacksonville Jaguars in 2007

No. 11
- Position: Wide receiver

Personal information
- Born: May 17, 1983 (age 43); Landstuhl, West Germany
- Listed height: 6 ft 4 in (1.93 m)
- Listed weight: 212 lb (96 kg)

Career information
- High school: Lakes (Lakewood, Washington, U.S.)
- College: Washington
- NFL draft: 2004: 1st round, 9th overall pick

Career history
- Jacksonville Jaguars (2004–2008); Seattle Seahawks (2010)*; Sacramento Mountain Lions (2011); Toronto Argonauts (2013)*
- * Offseason or practice squad member only

Awards and highlights
- Consensus All-American (2002); Pac-10 Co-Freshman of the Year (2001); 2× First-team All-Pac-10 (2002, 2003); Second-team All-Pac-10 (2001)

Career NFL statistics
- Receptions: 189
- Receiving yards: 2,322
- Receiving average: 12.3
- Receiving touchdowns: 18
- Stats at Pro Football Reference

Reginald Williams Jr. (born May 17, 1983) is an American former professional football player who was a wide receiver for the Jacksonville Jaguars of the National Football League (NFL). He played college football for the Washington Huskies, earning consensus All-American honors in 2002. He was selected by Jacksonville in the first round of the 2004 NFL draft, and played five seasons for the team.

== Early life ==
Williams was born on a U.S. military base in Landstuhl, West Germany. He lived with his family in Virginia until his father's military career moved them to Lakewood, Washington, where he attended Lakes High School. Williams led his Lakes Lancer high school football team to the championship game in his senior year and was the Associated Press Washington State Player of the Year.

== College career ==
Williams attended the University of Washington, and played for the Washington Huskies football team from 2001 to 2003. He was a first-team All-Pac-10 selection in 2002 and 2003, and was recognized as a consensus first-team All-American in 2002.

== Professional career ==
Pre-draft measurables
Height	Weight	Arm length	Hand span	40-yard dash	20-yard shuttle	Three-cone drill	Vertical jump	Broad jump
6 ft 3 3/4 in (1.92 m)	229 lb (104 kg)	32 1/8 in (0.82 m)	9 5/8 in (0.24 m)	4.56 s	4.34 s	7.01 s	36.0 in (0.91 m)	9 ft 11 in (3.02 m)
All values from NFL Combine/Pro Day

=== Jacksonville Jaguars ===
Williams was drafted in the first round with the ninth overall pick in the 2004 NFL draft by the Jacksonville Jaguars. He was the third receiver taken behind Larry Fitzgerald (3rd overall) and Roy Williams (7th overall).

Williams put up disappointing numbers in his rookie season of 2004. He rebounded the first half of 2005, but in the second half, he had a slump brought on by a concussion.

Through the first six weeks of the 2006 season, Williams was among the top receivers in the NFL. An ankle injury caused Byron Leftwich to miss the remainder of the season. After David Garrard became the starting quarterback, Williams' production slipped.

Williams had his best game as a pro against the New Orleans Saints in Week 9 of the 2007 season, making six catches for 128 yards and one touchdown. His best professional season to date was in 2007, where he had 38 catches for 629 yards (an average of 16.6 yards per catch) and 10 touchdowns (more than twice his career total prior to 2007). In a game against the Oakland Raiders in Week 16, he broke the Jaguars' single season receiving touchdown record, with ten scores, record previously held by the retired Jimmy Smith.

=== Seattle Seahawks ===
After spending the 2009 season out of football, Williams signed with the Seattle Seahawks on April 16, 2010. He was released from the Seattle Seahawks on June 18, 2010.

=== Sacramento Mountain Lions ===
On July 7, 2011, he signed with the Sacramento Mountain Lions. On September 18, 2011, he made his season debut against the Las Vegas Locomotives. He had his first receiving touchdown in the 3rd quarter in that game. On October 4, 2011, he was released by the team.

=== Toronto Argonauts ===
On May 29, 2013, Williams was signed by the Toronto Argonauts of the CFL. Williams played in both the 2013 CFL season preseason games for the Argos. In those games he caught 4 passes for 42 yards and a touchdown. On June 22, 2013, Williams was released by the Toronto Argonauts.

=== NFL statistics ===
Receiving statistics

Year	Team	Games	Receptions	Targets	Yards	Yards per Reception	Longest Reception	Touchdowns	First Downs	Fumbles	Fumbles Lost
2004	JAX	16	27	-	268	9.9	26	1	14	1	1
2005	JAX	16	35	-	445	12.7	41	0	23	2	1
2006	JAX	16	52	91	616	11.8	48	4	28	0	0
2007	JAX	15	38	60	629	16.6	80	10	29	3	2
2008	JAX	16	37	63	364	9.8	32	3	22	0	0
Career		79	189	214	2,322	12.3	80	18	116	6	4

Rushing statistics

Year	Team	Games	Carries	Yards	Yards per carry	Longest carry	Touchdowns	First downs	Fumbles	Fumbles lost
2005	JAX	16	2	3	1.5	10	0	1	0	0
2006	JAX	16	7	33	4.7	10	0	3	1	0
2007	JAX	15	1	8	8.0	8	0	1	0	0
2008	JAX	16	1	0	0.0	0	0	0	0	0
Career		79	11	44	4.0	10	0	5	1	0

== Personal life ==
Williams was arrested in January 2006 and charged with possession of marijuana; he was permitted to enter a pretrial intervention program, which he successfully completed. He was arrested again and charged with DWI and possession of marijuana on February 27, 2009, in Houston, Texas; both charges were later dismissed. On April 5, 2009, police officials reported Williams was arrested on felony drug charges after scuffling with Houston police officers at a local night club. Police tasered Williams and took him into custody at which time police found what appeared to be a bag of cocaine in his back pocket.

== See also ==
- Washington Huskies football statistical leaders
