= Gerald Alexander =

American football player and coach (born 1984)

Minnesota Vikings
- Title: Defensive pass game coordinator defensive backs coach

Personal information
- Born: June 28, 1984 (age 42); Los Angeles, California, U.S.
- Listed height: 6 ft 2 in (1.88 m)
- Listed weight: 209 lb (95 kg)

Career information
- Position: Safety (No. 42, 21)
- High school: Rancho Cucamonga (Rancho Cucamonga, California)
- College: Boise State
- NFL draft: 2007: 2nd round, 61st overall pick

Career history

Playing
- Detroit Lions (2007–2008); Jacksonville Jaguars (2009–2010); Carolina Panthers (2010); Miami Dolphins (2011); New York Jets (2011)

Coaching
- Arkansas State (2013) Student assistant; Washington (2014) Graduate assistant; Indiana State (2015) Defensive backs coach; Montana State (2016) Defensive backs coach; California (2017–2019) Defensive backs coach; Miami Dolphins (2020–2021) Defensive backs coach; Pittsburgh Steelers (2022–2023) Assistant defensive backs coach; Las Vegas Raiders (2024) Safeties coach; Pittsburgh Steelers (2025) Defensive backs coach; Minnesota Vikings (2026–present) Defensive pass game coordinator & defensive backs coach

Awards and highlights
- 4× First-team All-WAC

Career NFL statistics
- Total tackles: 159
- Sacks: 2.0
- Forced fumbles: 3
- Fumble recoveries: 4
- Interceptions: 4
- Stats at Pro Football Reference

Gerald Alexander (born June 28, 1984) is an American football coach and former safety. He played college football for the Boise State Broncos, and was selected by the Detroit Lions in the second round of the 2007 NFL draft. He also played for the Jacksonville Jaguars, Carolina Panthers, Miami Dolphins, and New York Jets. He is currently the defensive backs coach and pass game coordinator for the Minnesota Vikings.

Alexander was a former graduate assistant with Arkansas State University and University of Washington. In July 2015, he became the defensive backs coach at Indiana State University. In December 2015, he accepted the position of defensive backs coach at Montana State University, working under head coach Jeff Choate.

== Early life ==
Alexander attended Rancho Cucamonga High School from 1998 to 2002, where he was a track and field athlete as well.

He was one of the players who helped lead Boise State to their improbable Fiesta Bowl win over Oklahoma in the 2006 season. While at Boise State, Alexander was a four-time First-team All-WAC selection.

== Professional career ==
Pre-draft measurables
Height	Weight	Arm length	Hand span	40-yard dash	10-yard split	20-yard split	20-yard shuttle	Three-cone drill	Vertical jump	Broad jump	Bench press
6 ft 0 3/8 in (1.84 m)	210 lb (95 kg)	32 in (0.81 m)	9 in (0.23 m)	4.58 s	1.61 s	2.65 s	4.12 s	6.97 s	41.0 in (1.04 m)	10 ft 4 in (3.15 m)	15 reps
All values from NFL Combine/Pro Day

=== Detroit Lions ===
Alexander played all 16 games of his rookie season when safety Daniel Bullocks tore his ACL during a preseason game against the Indianapolis Colts. During the year, Alexander recorded 81 total tackles (59 solo and 22 assisted). He also had two sacks, two interceptions, and two fumble recoveries.

=== Jacksonville Jaguars ===
On June 26, 2009, he was traded to the Jacksonville Jaguars in exchange for Dennis Northcutt. On October 19, 2010, the Jaguars released Alexander.

=== Carolina Panthers ===
On November 23, 2010, the Carolina Panthers signed Alexander. He became a free agent after the season.

=== Miami Dolphins ===
Alexander signed with the Miami Dolphins on August 28, 2011. Alexander was released by the Dolphins on September 2. Alexander was re–signed by Miami on October 19.

=== New York Jets ===
Alexander was signed by the New York Jets on December 13, 2011, to add depth to the safety position following a season-ending injury to starting safety Jim Leonhard. He was released on March 14, 2012.

=== Statistics ===
Year	Team	Games	Combined tackles	Tackles	Assisted tackles	Sacks	Forced fumbles	Fumble recoveries	Fumble return yards	Interceptions	Interception return yards	Average Yards per Interception Return	Longest interception return	Interceptions returned for touchdown	Pass Defeneded	Stuffs	Stuff Yards	Kick Blocks
2007	DET	16	81	59	22	2.0	0	2	0	2	70	35	36	0	6	0	0	0
2008	DET	5	7	7	0	0.0	0	0	0	0	0	0	0	0	0	1	5	0
2009	JAX	15	55	45	10	0.0	3	1	0	2	23	12	22	0	5	0	0	0
2010	JAX	3	16	10	6	0.0	0	1	43	0	0	0	0	0	3	0	0	0
2010	CAR	2	0	0	0	0.0	0	0	0	0	0	0	0	0	0	0	0	0
2011	MIA	2	0	0	0	0.0	0	0	0	0	0	0	0	0	0	0	0	0
2011	NYJ	1	0	0	0	0.0	0	0	0	0	0	0	0	0	0	0	0	0
Total	Total	44	159	121	38	2.0	3	4	0	4	93	23	36	0	14	1	5	0

== Coaching career ==
=== Arkansas State ===
Alexander served as an undergraduate assistant on the coaching staff of Arkansas State for the 2013 season.

=== Washington Huskies ===
Alexander joined the Washington Huskies coaching staff as a graduate assistant in 2014 under head coach Chris Petersen.

=== Indiana State ===
After participating in the Bill Walsh Minority Internship Program with the Tennessee Titans during the team's 2015 training camp, Alexander served as the defensive backs coach for Indiana State.

=== Montana State ===
Alexander again participated in the Bill Walsh Minority Internship Program in the summer of 2016, this time with the Tampa Bay Buccaneers. Following the two-week program, Alexander coached Montana State's secondary.

=== California ===
Alexander joined University of California's coaching staff in 2017 as their defensive backs coach. He served in that role through the 2019 season.

=== Miami Dolphins ===
On January 24, 2020, it was reported that Alexander was hired by the Miami Dolphins to serve as the team's defensive backs coach under head coach Brian Flores. He missed the team's Week 9 game against the Arizona Cardinals on November 8, in accordance with COVID-19 protocols. On February 10, 2022, Alexander was fired by the Dolphins. Alexander was in his second year as the team's assistant defensive backs coach.

=== Pittsburgh Steelers ===
In his first season with the Pittsburgh Steelers, Alexander assisted with a Steelers secondary that tied for first in the League in interceptions with 20 in 2022. Safety Minkah Fitzpatrick led the group with six interceptions, earning Pro Bowl and First Team All-Pro honors.

=== Las Vegas Raiders ===
On January 24, 2024, Alexander was hired by the Las Vegas Raiders under new head coach Antonio Pierce and general manager Tom Telesco.

=== Pittsburgh Steelers (second stint) ===
On February 8, 2025, the Pittsburgh Steelers hired Alexander as their assistant defensive backs coach.

=== Minnesota Vikings ===
Alexander left Pittsburgh to join the Minnesota Vikings on January 1, 2026. He was hired by Minnesota to serve as a secondary coach and a pass game coordinator On July 28, Alexander was suspended three days by Minnesota stemming from an April DUI offense.
