= Richard Angulo =

American football player and coach (born 1980)

Jacksonville Jaguars
- Title: Tight ends coach

Personal information
- Born: August 13, 1980 (age 46); Santa Ana, California, U.S.
- Listed height: 6 ft 8 in (2.03 m)
- Listed weight: 266 lb (121 kg)

Career information
- Position: Tight end (No. 48, 86, 85)
- High school: Sandia (Albuquerque, New Mexico)
- College: Western New Mexico
- NFL draft: 2003: 7th round, 254th overall pick

Career history

Playing
- St. Louis Rams (2003); Minnesota Vikings (2003–2006); Chicago Bears (2006–2007)*; Jacksonville Jaguars (2007)*; Cleveland Browns (2007)*; Jacksonville Jaguars (2007–2008); Chicago Bears (2010)*
- * Offseason or practice squad member only

Coaching
- Lake Forest (IL) (2012) Tight ends coach; Trinity International (2013) Offensive line coach/strength & conditioning coach; Baltimore Ravens (2014) Offensive coaching intern; Baltimore Ravens (2015–2016) Tight ends coach; Baltimore Ravens (2017–2021) Assistant offensive line coach; Jacksonville Jaguars (2022–present) Tight ends coach

Career NFL statistics
- Receptions: 17
- Receiving yards: 155
- Receiving touchdowns: 1
- Stats at Pro Football Reference

Richard Angulo (born August 13, 1980) is an American football coach and former tight end who is the tight ends coach for the Jacksonville Jaguars of the National Football League (NFL). He previously served as an assistant coach for the Baltimore Ravens.

Angulo played college football for the Western New Mexico Mustangs and was selected by the St. Louis Rams in the seventh round of the 2003 NFL draft. He was also a member of the Minnesota Vikings, Chicago Bears, Jacksonville Jaguars and Cleveland Browns.

== Playing career ==
Pre-draft measurables
Height	Weight
6 ft 6 5/8 in (2.00 m)	258 lb (117 kg)
Values from Pro Day

=== St. Louis Rams ===
Angulo was selected by the St. Louis Rams in the seventh round, with the 254th overall pick, of the 2003 NFL draft. He officially signed with the team on July 23, 2003. He played in five games for the Rams in 2003, and was targeted once but recorded no catches. Angulo was waived on November 24, 2003.

=== Minnesota Vikings ===
Angulo was claimed off waivers by the Minnesota Vikings on November 25, 2003. He did not play in any games for the Vikings in 2003 and was placed on injured reserve the next year on September 5, 2004. He was waived on September 3, 2005, and signed to the team's practice squad two days later. Angulo was promoted to the active roster on November 16, 2005, and played in two games during the 2005 season, catching one pass for 11 yards. The next year, he was waived by the Vikings on September 2, 2006, and signed to the practice squad two days later. He was released by the Vikings on November 23, 2006.

=== Chicago Bears (first stint) ===
Angulo was signed to the practice squad of the Chicago Bears on November 25, 2006. He re-signed with the Bears on February 7, 2007. He was released on May 18, 2007.

=== Jacksonville Jaguars (first stint) ===
Angulo signed with the Jacksonville Jaguars on May 21, 2007. He was released on September 5, 2007.

=== Cleveland Browns ===
Angulo was signed to the practice squad of the Cleveland Browns on October 16, 2007. He was released on November 10 and signed back to the practice squad on November 14, 2007.

=== Jacksonville Jaguars (second stint) ===
On November 26, 2007, the Jaguars signed Angulo off of the Browns' practice squad. He appeared in five games for the Jaguars in 2007, recording eight receptions for 81 yards and one touchdown. He played in a career-high 15 games, starting six, during the 2008 season, catching eight passes for 63 yards. Angulo was released by the Jaguars on September 5, 2009.

=== Chicago Bears (second stint) ===
Angulo signed with the Chicago Bears on February 23, 2010. He was released on September 4, 2010.

== Coaching career ==
=== Baltimore Ravens ===
Angulo was the Baltimore Ravens' tight ends coach from 2015 to 2016. He was moved to assistant offensive line coach on January 12, 2017. He took over as offensive line coach for the team's week 12 game in 2020 against the Pittsburgh Steelers, replacing Joe D'Alessandris who missed the game due to illness.

=== Jacksonville Jaguars ===
On February 17, 2022, Angulo was hired by the Jacksonville Jaguars as their tight ends coach under head coach Doug Pederson.
