= Rashod Moulton =

American football player (born 1981)

No. 39, 40
- Position: Cornerback

Personal information
- Born: January 1, 1981 (age 45); St. Petersburg, Florida, U.S.
- Listed height: 5 ft 11 in (1.80 m)
- Listed weight: 184 lb (83 kg)

Career information
- High school: Lakewood (St. Petersburg, Florida)
- College: Fort Valley State
- NFL draft: 2007: undrafted

Career history
- Jacksonville Jaguars (2007–2008)*; Denver Broncos (2008–2009)*
- * Offseason or practice squad member only

Awards and highlights
- 2× All-SIAC (2005–2006)

Rashod Moulton (born January 1, 1981) is an American former football cornerback. He was signed by the Jacksonville Jaguars as an undrafted free agent in 2007. He played college football at the Fort Valley State.

Moulton was also a member of the Denver Broncos.
