= John Broussard =

American football player (born 1983)

No. 15
- Position: Wide receiver

Personal information
- Born: December 18, 1983 (age 42); Port Arthur, Texas, U.S.
- Listed height: 6 ft 1 in (1.85 m)
- Listed weight: 176 lb (80 kg)

Career information
- High school: Kingwood (Kingwood, Texas)
- College: San Jose State
- NFL draft: 2007: 7th round, 229th overall pick

Career history
- Jacksonville Jaguars (2007); New York Giants (2008)*; Chicago Bears (2008)*; Detroit Lions (2009)*
- * Offseason or practice squad member only

Career NFL statistics
- Receptions: 4
- Receiving yards: 126
- Receiving touchdowns: 1
- Stats at Pro Football Reference

John Benjamin Broussard (born December 18, 1983) is an American former professional football player who was a wide receiver in the National Football League (NFL). He was selected by the Jacksonville Jaguars in the seventh round of the 2007 NFL draft. He played college football for the San Jose State Spartans.

Broussard was also a member of the New York Giants, Chicago Bears and Detroit Lions. He is the younger brother of NFL player Jamall Broussard.

== Early life ==
Born in Port Arthur, Texas, Broussard graduated from Kingwood High School in Kingwood, Houston, Texas in 2002.

== College career ==
As a senior at San Jose State, Broussard helped the Spartans to a victory in the inaugural New Mexico Bowl as well as helping SJSU to its first winning season in 6 years.

== Professional career ==
=== Jacksonville Jaguars ===
On September 9, 2007, in the Jaguars first regular season game, Broussard caught the first pass of his career, a 47-yard touchdown pass from quarterback David Garrard. Broussard was waived by the Jaguars on August 26, 2008.

=== New York Giants ===
Broussard was signed to the practice squad of the New York Giants on September 24, 2008 after wide receiver Taye Biddle was promoted to the active roster. Broussard was released on October 8 to make room for Biddle on the practice squad.

=== Chicago Bears ===
Broussard was signed to the practice squad of the Chicago Bears on October 15, 2008. After finishing the season on the practice squad, he was re-signed to a future contract on December 29, 2008.

The Bears waived Broussard on August 31, 2009.

=== Detroit Luons ===
Broussard was signed to the practice squad of the Detroit Lions on September 7, 2009. He was released on September 29, 2009.

== Personal life ==
Broussard's brother Jamall, who also went to San Jose State, played for the Cincinnati Bengals and Carolina Panthers as a return specialist in 2004.
