= 2003 Arkansas vs. Kentucky football game =

2003 American college football game

Longest game in NCAA Division I-A history
Arkansas Razorbacks	Kentucky Wildcats
(4–3)	(4–4)
71	63
Head coach: Houston Nutt	Head coach: Rich Brooks
	1	2	3	4	OT	2OT	3OT	4OT	5OT	6OT	7OT	Total
Arkansas	7	14	0	3	7	7	3	8	6	8	8	71
Kentucky	7	0	7	10	7	7	3	8	6	8	0	63
- Date: November 1–2, 2003
- Season: 2003
- Stadium: Commonwealth Stadium
- Location: Lexington, Kentucky
- Referee: Thomas Ritter
- Attendance: 66,124

United States TV coverage
- Network: ESPN2

The 2003 Arkansas vs. Kentucky football game was a college football game played on November 1, 2003, between the University of Arkansas Razorbacks and the University of Kentucky Wildcats; at the time, it tied an NCAA record for the longest football game ever played. The game included seven overtime periods. Penn State and the Illinois beat that record in October 2021, albeit under different overtime rules. Arkansas led the game all but a few minutes of regulation until a Kentucky touchdown drive in the last few minutes tied it at 24–24. Both teams had a blocked punt recovered for a touchdown, another rarity. The game ended in the seventh overtime period when Kentucky quarterback Jared Lorenzen fumbled the football on a quarterback keeper play, ending the game.

== Before the game ==
Coincidentally, Arkansas played a 7 overtime game against Ole Miss on November 3, 2001 - winning that game 58–56. Arkansas also lost a 6 overtime game to Tennessee in 2002, 38–41. Former Arkansas head coach Houston Nutt has been recorded as saying about overtime, "Winning is always fun, but when you win in overtime, where your players had to go that extra mile, it's really gratifying and special." Nutt continued to say, "I always like our chances in overtime."

Kentucky's head man Rich Brooks has said of overtime, "[Nutt has] obviously been through a lot of them, and when you get through them and know you've had success and your team knows you've had success, I think mentally that goes a long ways in helping you get the victory ultimately whether it goes one, two, three, four or seven overtimes."

Kentucky was 1–1 in overtime coming into this contest, beating Alabama and losing to Louisville both by the score of 40–34, both being only one overtime affairs.

== Game summary ==
=== First quarter ===
The game began at 7:00 pm eastern time on November 1, 2003, but would continue into November 2. The game opened with three punts before Decori Birmingham ran for a ten-yard score for Arkansas to give the Hogs a 7–0 lead. Another three punts before Arkansas' had their punt blocked, to be recovered by Kentucky's Andrew Hopewell for a touchdown to tie the game 7–7.

=== Second quarter ===
Arkansas quarterback Matt Jones threw a 26-yard touchdown strike to Richard Smith to open the scoring in the second period. It wasn't long before Arkansas' special teams returned the favor to Kentucky, blocking a Wildcat punt and scoring to push the Razorback advantage to 21–7. A promising drive was ended when an errant pass by Jared Lorenzen was intercepted by Ahmad Carroll, but the Razorbacks failed to capitalize, missing the 40-yard field goal before heading into the locker room for halftime.

=== Third quarter ===
The Wildcats came out and scored on the first second half possession, a 51-yard touchdown toss by Lorenzen to fullback Alexis Bwenge, cutting into the Razorbacks cushion. Cedric Cobbs of Arkansas fumbled at the end of the third quarter, but after recovering Kentucky was forced to punt, down 21–14.

=== Fourth quarter ===
Both teams swapped field goals before Lorenzen hit Chris Bernard to tie the game at 24. Arkansas had a chance at a game-winning drive with the ball with 1:30 left and two timeouts, but the drive ended in a punt with fourteen ticks left on the clock.

=== Overtime ===
In college football, both teams start on the opponent's twenty-five yard line and try to score (similar to innings in baseball). These overtimes repeat until a winner is decided. This system was adopted in 1996.

==== First overtime ====
Birmingham started off the extra frame with three straight rushes and a first down. Matt Jones added an 11-yard completion before fullback Mark Pierce scored from one yard out. Kentucky's drive was helped out by Arkansas, with ten and seven yard penalties bringing the Wildcats seventeen of the twenty five yards required to score a touchdown. A two-yard touchdown run from Alexis Bwenge, with complete extra point from placekicker Taylor Begley knotted the game at 31.

==== Second overtime ====
Kentucky began on the offensive end in the second overtime, and scored on their second play. First, an 18-yard hookup from Lorenzen to Jeremiah Drobney before Alexis Bwenge again scored the go-ahead touchdown to give the Wildcats a 38–31 lead. Arkansas ran the ball five times before calling a timeout with a third down on the Kentucky two-yard line. Arkansas came out of the time out and committed a penalty costing the Razorbacks five precious yards, but Matt Jones completed his pass across the middle to Jason Peters to force a third overtime.

==== Third overtime ====
As per NCAA rules, beginning with the third overtime teams must go for a two-point conversion instead of kicking an extra point, but both Arkansas and Kentucky could only manage field goals on their possessions.

Matt Jones began with a 13-yard completion, but the Arkansas drive stalled and Chris Balseiro had to kick a 25-yard field goal. Similar to Arkansas' first overtime drive, Kentucky ran the ball five times before calling a timeout on a third down on the Arkansas two-yard line. The Razorback defense kept Ronald (Rock) Johnson out of the end zone, forcing a Taylor Begley field goal and tying the game at 41.

==== Fourth overtime ====
Lorenzen completed two passes on the drive, and finally ran in for the score in the fourth overtime. The two point play was a Jared Lorenzen completion to Derek Abney. Arkansas moved to the Kentucky two before Matt Jones fumbled. Jones recovered his own miscue. After a timeout, an incomplete Jones pass meant Arkansas must either score on the fourth down play or drop a fourth straight game. Jones scrambled into the end zone, and then completed a pass to Mark Pierce to draw to a 49–49 tie heading into the fifth overtime.

==== Fifth overtime ====
After an 11-yard Birmingham run, Jones slung a 15-yard touchdown pass to take the lead into the fifth overtime, but the two point pass to Wilson was incomplete, meaning Kentucky had only to score and make the two-point conversion to end the game. A two-yard run by Derek Abney, followed with a Jared Lorenzen pass across the middle complete to Jeremiah Drobney for 7 yards put the Wildcats in business. "Hefty Lefty" Jared Lorenzen then ran the ball four plays, culminating in fourteen yards total and a touchdown. Tied at 55, Kentucky attempted the two point play that could have finished the game. The pass to Tommy Cook was incomplete, however, sending the game into a sixth overtime.

==== Sixth overtime ====
Lorenzen continued his success on the ground with eighteen yards in the sixth overtime, one of his runs a one-yard touchdown run. This time, the pass to Tommy Cook was good, giving the Wildcats a 63–55 advantage. Matt Jones quickly answered with a sixteen-yard pass and seven-yard rush, moving the Hog offense to the two. Mark Pierce rumbled the additional two yards to score, and Arkansas was a two-point play away from a seventh overtime. Jones completed the pass to Wilson to knot the game at 63.

==== Seventh overtime ====
Matt Jones threw an incomplete pass before Decori Birmingham scored on a 25-yard touchdown run to give the Hogs a 69–63 advantage. The all-important two-point conversion was a completion to Jason Peters, giving Arkansas a 71–63 cushion. Kentucky first completed a pass for twelve yards, but a fourth and three on the Razorback five proved the game winner, as a Lorenzen fumble was recovered by all-SEC linebacker Tony Bua of Arkansas.

Arkansas Razorbacks at Kentucky Wildcats

Quarter	1	2	3	4	OT	2OT	3OT	4OT	5OT	6OT	7OT	Total
Razorbacks	7	14	0	3	7	7	3	8	6	8	8	71
Wildcats	7	0	7	10	7	7	3	8	6	8	0	63

at Commonwealth Stadium, Lexington, Kentucky

- Date: November 1, 2003
- Game time: 7:00 p.m. EST
- Game weather: Temperature: 67 °F (19 °C) • Wind: Calm • Weather: Mostly cloudy
- Game attendance: 66,124
- Referee: Thomas Ritter
- TV: ESPN2

Game information
First quarter
- ARK – DeCori Birmingham 10-yard run (Chris Balseiro kick), 7:57. Razorbacks 7–0. Drive: 4 plays, 49 yards, 1:04.
- UK – Andrew Hopewell 6-yard blocked punt return (Taylor Begley kick), 0:10. Tied 7–7.

Second quarter

- ARK – Richard Smith 26-yard pass from Matt Jones (Chris Balseiro kick), 8:54. Razorbacks 14–7. Drive: 13 plays, 80 yards, 6:22.
- ARK – Tom Crowder 0-yard blocked punt return (Chris Balseiro kick), 6:45. Razorbacks 21–7.

Third quarter

- UK – Alexis Bwenge 51-yard pass from Jared Lorenzen (Taylor Begley kick), 3:44. Razorbacks 21–14. Drive: 3 plays, 54 yards, 1:07.

Fourth quarter

- UK – Taylor Begley 34-yard field goal, 7:11. Razorbacks 21–17. Drive: 16 plays, 49 yards, 5:41.
- ARK – Chris Balseiro 37-yard field goal, 3:22. Razorbacks 24–17. Drive: 7 plays, 68 yards, 3:50.
- UK – Chris Bernard 13-yard pass from Jared Lorenzen (Taylor Begley kick), 1:38. Tied 24–24. Drive: 9 plays, 79 yards, 1:45.

First overtime

- ARK – Mark Pierce 1-yard run (Chris Balseiro kick). Razorbacks 31–24. Drive: 5 plays, 25 yards.
- UK – Alexis Bwenge 2-yard run (Taylor Begley kick). Tied 31–31. Drive: 5 plays, 25 yards.

Second overtime

- UK – Alexis Bwenge 7-yard run (Taylor Begley kick). Wildcats 38–31. 2 plays, 25 yards.
- ARK – Jason Peters 7-yard pass from Matt Jones (Chris Balseiro kick). Tied 38–38. Drive: 6 plays, 25 yards.

Third overtime

- ARK – Chris Balseiro 25-yard field goal. Razorbacks 41–38. Drive: 5 plays, 17 yards.
- UK – Taylor Begley 24-yard field goal. Tied 41–41. Drive: 7 plays, 19 yards.

Fourth overtime

- UK – Jared Lorenzen 1-yard run (Jared Lorezen pass to Derek Abney). Wildcats 49–41. Drive: 5 plays, 25 yards.
- ARK – Matt Jones 3-yard run (Matt Jones pass to Mark Pierce). Tied 49–49. Drive: 5 plays, 25 yards.

Fifth overtime

- ARK – George Wilson 15-yard pass from Matt Jones (pass failed). Razorbacks 55–49. Drive: 4 plays, 25 yards.
- UK – Jared Lorenzen 2-yard run (pass failed). Tied 55–55. Drive: 8 plays, 25 yards.

Sixth overtime

- UK – Jared Lorenzen 1-yard run (Jared Lorezen pass to Tommy Cook). Wildcats 63–55. Drive: 5 plays, 25 yards.
- ARK – Mark Pierce 2-yard run (Matt Jones pass to George Wilson). Tied 63–63. Drive: 3 plays, 25 yards.

Seventh overtime

- ARK – DeCori Birmingham 25-yard run (Matt Jones pass to Jason Peters). Razorbacks 71–63. Drive: 2 plays, 25 yards.

=== Statistics ===
Statistics	Arkansas	Kentucky
First downs	29	29
Total yards	605	506
Rushing yards	334	180
Passing yards	271	326
Turnovers	2	2
Time of possession	32:53	27:07

Team	Category	Player	Statistics
Arkansas	Passing	Matt Jones	16/25, 260 yards, 3 TD
Arkansas	Rushing	DeCori Birmingham	40 rushes, 196 yards, 2 TD
Arkansas	Receiving	George Wilson	9 receptions, 172 yards, TD
Kentucky	Passing	Jared Lorenzen	28/49, 326 yards, 2 TD, INT
Kentucky	Rushing	Alexis Bwenge	22 rushes, 89 yards, 2 TD
Kentucky	Receiving	Derek Abney	10 receptions, 91 yards

== Aftermath ==
The game ended at 12:01 am on November 2, 2003. This game also set an NCAA record for the most points scored in a game (after 1950, until 2018). Arkansas scored 47 points in overtime, breaking their own record of 41. Both teams combined for 86 overtime points, six more than the 2001 seven overtime affair. The game lasted 4 hours and 56 minutes.

== Players involved ==
Matt Jones went 16 of 25 passing for 260 yards and three TDs, while running for 112 yards and a score. Decori Birmingham, normally a receiver but filling in for injured tailbacks, had 196 yards rushing and two touchdowns for Arkansas. Arkansas wideout George Wilson caught nine passes for 172 yards and a score.

For Kentucky, Lorenzen went 28 of 49, throwing for 326 yards, two touchdowns and one interception. Lorenzen also added 39 rushing yards and three rushing TD's to his total. Abney was Lorenzen's favorite target, catching ten balls for 91 yards.

== See also ==
- 2007 Navy vs. North Texas football game – formerly the FBS record for most points scored in a game in regulation.
- 2007 Weber State vs. Portland State football game – featured the most points scored in a game between two Division I opponents.
