= Justin Slaten =

American baseball player (born 1997)

Boston Red Sox – No. 63
- Pitcher
- Born: September 15, 1997 (age 29); Longview, Texas, U.S.
- Bats: Right Throws: Right

MLB debut
- March 30, 2024, for the Boston Red Sox

MLB statistics (through 2026 season)
- Win–loss record: 10–10
- Earned run average: 3.73
- Strikeouts: 122
- Stats at Baseball Reference

Teams
- Boston Red Sox (2024–present)

Justin Michael Slaten (born September 15, 1997) is an American professional baseball pitcher for the Boston Red Sox of Major League Baseball (MLB). Slaten made his MLB debut in 2024.

== Career ==
=== Amateur ===
Slaten attended Hallsville High School in Hallsville, Texas. As a senior, Slaten went 6–5 with a 1.49 earned run average (ERA) and 105 strikeouts in 75 innings pitched. Undrafted out of high school, he attended The University of New Mexico to play college baseball for the New Mexico Lobos. In his freshman season of 2017, Slaten went 2–2 with a 3.71 ERA and 27 strikeouts over 33 2/3 innings. He struggled in his sophomore of 2018 to a 2–9 record with a 7.02 ERA over 66 2/3 innings. During the summer of 2018, Slaten played for the Eau Claire Express of the Northwoods League, going 7–1 with a 1.58 ERA and 70 strikeouts over 57 innings. In his junior season of 2019, Slaten went 5–5 with a 2.51 ERA and 98 strikeouts over 82 1/3 innings.

=== Texas Rangers ===
The Texas Rangers selected Slaten in the third round of the 2019 MLB draft and he signed with them. Slaten split his professional debut season of 2019 between the AZL Rangers of the Rookie-level Arizona League and the Spokane Indians of the Low–A Northwest League, going a combined 0–2 with a 6.06 ERA and 22 strikeouts over 16 1/3 innings. He did not play in a game in 2020 due to the cancellation of the minor league season because of the COVID-19 pandemic. He spent the 2021 season with the Hickory Crawdads of the High-A East, going 4–8 with a 6.01 ERA and 110 strikeouts over 82 1/3 innings.

Slaten spent the 2022 season with the Frisco RoughRiders of the Double-A Texas League, going 1–6 with a 6.93 ERA and 64 strikeouts over 50 2/3 innings. Slaten returned to Frisco to open the 2023 season, going 4–3 with a 3.16 ERA and 76 strikeouts over 51 1/3 innings. He was promoted to the Round Rock Express of the Triple-A Pacific Coast League in September and posted a 1–0 record with a 1.08 ERA over 8 1/3 innings. Following the 2023 season, Slaten played for the Surprise Saguaros of the Arizona Fall League.

=== Boston Red Sox ===
On December 6, 2023, the New York Mets chose Slaten with the seventh selection in the Rule 5 draft, and traded him to the Boston Red Sox in exchange for minor league left-handed pitcher Ryan Ammons and cash considerations. Slaten was added to Boston's Opening Day roster, and made his major league debut on March 30. In 44 appearances for the Red Sox during his rookie campaign, Slaten compiled a 6-2 record and 2.93 ERA with 58 strikeouts and two saves across 55 1/3 innings pitched.

Slaten made 24 appearances for Boston to begin the 2025 campaign, posting a 1-4 record and 3.47 ERA with 16 strikeouts and three saves across 23 1/3 innings pitched. On June 1, 2025, Slaten was placed on the injured list due to shoulder inflammation; he was transferred to the 60-day injured list on June 28. Slaten was activated on August 28.

== See also ==
- Rule 5 draft results
