= 2008 Jacksonville Jaguars season =

14th season in franchise history

- Owner: Wayne Weaver
- General manager: James "Shack" Harris
- Head coach: Jack Del Rio
- Offensive coordinator: Dirk Koetter
- Defensive coordinator: Gregg Williams
- Home stadium: Jacksonville Municipal Stadium

Results
- Record: 5–11
- Division place: 4th AFC South
- Playoffs: Did not qualify
- Pro Bowlers: None

Uniform

The 2008 Jacksonville Jaguars season was the franchise's 14th season in the National Football League (NFL) and the 6th under head coach Jack Del Rio. The Jaguars failed to improve upon their 11–5 record from 2007 and did not make the playoffs. The Jaguars struggled to a 5–11 finish, the franchise's worst record since 2003. The team's struggles were in part the result of a rash of injuries to the team's offensive line. The Jaguars lost starting guards Vince Manuwai and Maurice Williams for the season within the first quarter of the opening game. Tackle Richard Collier's career ended in early September when he was brutally attacked and shot 14 times. Center Brad Meester missed the first two months of the season and guard Chris Naeole, signed to the roster mid-season in response to these injuries, was injured in pregame warmups before playing a single snap. Against teams with smaller defensive linemen, the 2008 Jaguars offense resembled the 2007 offense because the line was able to dominate. An example is the 23–21 victory in Indianapolis against the Colts that saw David Garrard drive the Jaguars into field goal range in the final minute, culminating with Josh Scobee booting the game-winning 51-yard field goal. However, the Jaguars overall struggled, especially in the second half of the season, as evidenced by a 21–19 loss to the Bengals, who entered the game with an 0–8 record.

This season marked the end of an era as running back Fred Taylor left the team after 11 seasons.

== Offseason ==
=== NFL draft ===
2008 Jacksonville Jaguars draft
Round	Pick	Player	Position	College	Notes
1	8	Derrick Harvey	Defensive end	Florida	
2	52	Quentin Groves	Defensive end	Auburn	
5	155	Thomas Williams	Linebacker	USC	
5	159	Trae Williams	Cornerback	USF	
7	213	Chauncey Washington	Running back	USC	
Made roster † Pro Football Hall of Fame * Made at least one Pro Bowl during career

=== Trades and free agent signings ===
- WR Troy Williamson acquired via trade from the Minnesota Vikings in exchange for a 6th round pick in the 2008 NFL draft.
- WR Jerry Porter signed as a free agent from the Oakland Raiders.
- CB Drayton Florence acquired as a free agent from the San Diego Chargers.
- QB Cleo Lemon acquired as a free agent from the Miami Dolphins.
- DT Marcus Stroud was traded to the Buffalo Bills in exchange for picks in the third and fifth round of the 2008 NFL draft.
- WR Ernest Wilford left as a free agent to sign with the Miami Dolphins.
- DE Bobby McCray left as a free agent to sign with the New Orleans Saints.
- S Sammy Knight left as a free agent to sign with the New York Giants.

=== Richard Collier shooting ===
On September 2, 2008, third-year offensive tackle Richard Collier was shot outside an apartment building in Jacksonville while waiting for his girlfriend with a friend of his, former teammate Kenny Pettway, in his Cadillac Escalade. He was shot 14 times, largely in his lower torso and upper legs. Five bullets lodged in his bladder, and two struck his spine, severing his spinal cord. He was critically wounded, and spent three weeks on a ventilator. He was left paraplegic, as well as having his left leg amputated below the knee due to embolisms.

== Final roster ==
2008 Jacksonville Jaguars roster
Quarterbacks (QB): 9 David Garrard; 17 Cleo Lemon; 12 Paul Smith; Running backs (RB): 32 Maurice Jones-Drew KR; 24 Montell Owens; 39 Alvin Pearman; 34 Chauncey Washington; Wide receivers (WR): 16 Nate Hughes; 86 Dennis Northcutt PR; 81 Mike Walker; 11 Reggie Williams; 84 Troy Williamson KR; Tight ends (TE): 85 Richard Angulo; 83 Greg Estandia; 89 Marcedes Lewis; 87 George Wrighster	Offensive linemen (OL): 69 Khalif Barnes T; 72 Jordan Black T; 63 Brad Meester C; 61 Drew Miller C/G; 62 Dennis Norman C/G; 77 Uche Nwaneri G; 79 Tony Pashos T; 75 Stefan Rodgers T; 70 Cameron Stephenson G; Defensive linemen (DL): 90 Mkristo Bruce DE; 99 Atiyyah Ellison DT; 93 Quentin Groves DE; 91 Derrick Harvey DE; 97 Reggie Hayward DE; 98 John Henderson DT; 66 Derek Landri DT; 92 Rob Meier DT; 94 Jeremy Mincey DE; 95 Paul Spicer DE	Linebackers (LB): 56 Justin Durant OLB; 51 Clint Ingram OLB; 59 Brian Iwuh OLB; 54 Mike Peterson MLB; 57 Tim Shaw OLB; 53 Thomas Williams MLB; Defensive backs (DB): 26 Kennard Cox CB; 21 Drayton Florence CB; 22 Will James CB; 37 Calvin Lowry SS; 25 Reggie Nelson FS; 20 Pierson Prioleau FS; 43 Gerald Sensabaugh FS/SS; 29 Brian Williams CB/SS; 38 Brian Witherspoon CB/RS; Special teams (ST): 10 Josh Scobee K; 6 Steve Weatherford P; 88 Joe Zelenka LS	Practice squad: 36 Isaiah Gardner CB; 35 Keon Lattimore RB; 73 Tim Mattran C; 58 Lamar Myles LB; 68 Henry Smith DT; 14 D'Juan Woods WR; 23 Jonathan Zenon CB; Reserve: 76 Richard Collier T (Ret.); 44 Anthony Cotrone FB (IR); 33 Greg Jones FB (IR); 18 Matt Jones WR (Susp.); -- Jonathan Lewis DT (IR); 67 Vince Manuwai G (IR); 27 Rashean Mathis CB (IR); 96 Tony McDaniel DT (IR); 65 Chris Naeole G (IR); 42 Chad Nkang S (IR); 3 Adam Podlesh P (IR); 80 Jerry Porter WR (IR); 52 Daryl Smith LB (IR); 31 Scott Starks CB (IR); 28 Fred Taylor RB (IR); 74 Maurice Williams T (IR); -- James Wyche DE (IR); Rookies in italics 53 active, 17 reserve, 7 practice squad

== Preseason ==
Week	Date	Opponent	Result	Record	Venue
1	August 9	Atlanta Falcons	W 20–17	1–0	Jacksonville Municipal Stadium
2	August 16	Miami Dolphins	L 14–19	1–1	Jacksonville Municipal Stadium
3	August 23	at Tampa Bay Buccaneers	W 23–17	2–1	Raymond James Stadium
4	August 28	at Washington Redskins	W 24–3	3–1	FedExField

== Regular season ==
=== Schedule ===
Week	Date	Opponent	Result	Record	Venue	Attendance
1	September 7	at **Tennessee Titans**	**L** 10–17	0–1	LP Field	69,143
2	September 14	Buffalo Bills	**L** 16–20	0–2	Jacksonville Municipal Stadium	65,167
3	September 21	at **Indianapolis Colts**	**W** 23–21	1–2	Lucas Oil Stadium	65,938
4	September 28	**Houston Texans**	**W** 30–27 (OT)	2–2	Jacksonville Municipal Stadium	64,061
5	October 5	Pittsburgh Steelers	**L** 21–26	2–3	Jacksonville Municipal Stadium	65,908
6	October 12	at Denver Broncos	**W** 24–17	3–3	Invesco Field at Mile High	75,674
7	Bye					
8	October 26	Cleveland Browns	**L** 17–23	3–4	Jacksonville Municipal Stadium	64,775
9	November 2	at Cincinnati Bengals	**L** 19–21	3–5	Paul Brown Stadium	64,238
10	November 9	at Detroit Lions	**W** 38–14	4–5	Ford Field	52,631
11	November 16	**Tennessee Titans**	**L** 14–24	4–6	Jacksonville Municipal Stadium	65,258
12	November 23	Minnesota Vikings	**L** 12–30	4–7	Jacksonville Municipal Stadium	65,064
13	December 1	at **Houston Texans**	**L** 17–30	4–8	Reliant Stadium	70,809
14	December 7	at Chicago Bears	**L** 10–23	4–9	Soldier Field	61,736
15	December 14	Green Bay Packers	**W** 20–16	5–9	Jacksonville Municipal Stadium	65,457
16	December 18	**Indianapolis Colts**	**L** 24–31	5–10	Jacksonville Municipal Stadium	65,648
17	December 28	at Baltimore Ravens	**L** 7–27	5–11	M&T Bank Stadium	71,366

Note: Intra-division opponents are in bold text.

=== Game summaries ===
==== Week 1: at Tennessee Titans ====
Week One: Jacksonville Jaguars at Tennessee Titans – Game summary

Quarter	1	2	3	4	Total
Jaguars	0	7	0	3	**10**
**Titans**	3	7	0	7	**17**

at LP Field, Nashville, Tennessee

- Date: September 7, 2008
- Game time: 12:00 p.m. CST
- Game weather: Sunny, 78 °F (26 °C)
- Game attendance: 69,143
- Referee: Tony Corrente
- TV announcers (CBS): Ian Eagle and Solomon Wilcots
- Recap, Game Book

Game information

**First quarter**

- TEN – Rob Bironas 47-yard field goal, 9:50. Titans 3–0. **Drive: 6 plays, 48 yards, 3:22.**

**Second quarter**

- JAX – Greg Jones 1-yard pass from David Garrard (Josh Scobee kick), 10:16. Jaguars 7–3. **Drive: 3 plays, 5 yards, 1:19.**
- TEN – Chris Johnson 7-yard pass from Vince Young (Rob Bironas kick), 3:09. Titans 10–3. **Drive: 7 plays, 75 yards, 3:19.**

**Third quarter**

- No scoring plays.

**Fourth quarter**

- TEN – LenDale White 1-yard run (Rob Bironas kick), 3:47. Titans 17–7. **Drive: 9 plays, 80 yards, 2:10.**
- JAX – Josh Scobee 27-yard field goal, 2:12. Titans 17–10. **Drive: 7 plays, 45 yards, 1:35.**

**Top passers**

- JAX – David Garrard – 23/35, 215 yards, TD, 2 INT
- TEN – Vince Young – 12/22, 110 yards, TD, 2 INT

**Top rushers**

- JAX – Fred Taylor – 9 rushes, 18 yards
- TEN – Chris Johnson – 15 rushes, 93 yards

**Top receivers**

- JAX – Matt Jones – 6 receptions, 80 yards
- TEN – Bo Scaife – 6 receptions, 105 yards

==== Week 2: vs. Buffalo Bills ====
Week Two: Buffalo Bills at Jacksonville Jaguars – Game summary

Quarter	1	2	3	4	Total
**Bills**	7	3	0	10	**20**
Jaguars	0	3	10	3	**16**

at Jacksonville Municipal Stadium, Jacksonville, Florida

- Date: September 14, 2008
- Game time: 1:00 p.m. EDT
- Game weather: 87 °F (31 °C)
- Game attendance: 65,167
- Referee: Scott Green
- TV announcers (CBS): Gus Johnson and Steve Tasker
- Recap, Game Book

Game information

**First quarter**

- BUF – Marshawn Lynch 11-yard run (Rian Lindell kick), 8:00. Bills 7–0. **Drive: 11 plays, 82 yards, 7:00.**

**Second quarter**

- JAX – Josh Scobee 28-yard field goal, 13:22. Bills 7–3. **Drive: 10 plays, 46 yards, 5:08.**
- BUF – Rian Lindell 21-yard field goal, 6:21. Bills 10–3. **Drive: 12 plays, 77 yards, 7:01.**

**Third quarter**

- JAX – Maurice Jones-Drew 2-yard run (Josh Scobee kick), 9:31. Tied 10–10. **Drive: 11 plays, 74 yards, 5:29.**
- JAX – Josh Scobee 50-yard field goal, 6:06. Jaguars 13–10. **Drive: 6 plays, 29 yards, 3:25.**

**Fourth quarter**

- JAX – Josh Scobee 39-yard field goal, 14:31. Jaguars 16–10. **Drive: 8 plays, 15 yards, 4:04.**
- BUF – James Hardy 3-yard pass from Trent Edwards (Rian Lindell kick), 4:10. Bills 17–16. **Drive: 9 plays, 74 yards, 3:50.**
- BUF – Rian Lindell 45-yard field goal, 0:24. Bills 20–16. **Drive: 6 plays, 5 yards, 2:57.**

**Top passers**

- BUF – Trent Edwards – 20/25, 239 yards, TD
- JAX – David Garrard – 17/28, 165 yards, INT

**Top rushers**

- BUF – Marshawn Lynch – 19 rushes, 59 yards, TD
- JAX – Fred Taylor – 14 rushes, 49 yards

**Top receivers**

- BUF – Fred Jackson – 7 receptions, 83 yards
- JAX – Matt Jones – 5 receptions, 50 yards

==== Week 3: at Indianapolis Colts ====
Week Three: Jacksonville Jaguars at Indianapolis Colts – Game summary

Quarter	1	2	3	4	Total
**Jaguars**	0	10	7	6	**23**
Colts	7	7	0	7	**21**

at Lucas Oil Stadium, Indianapolis, Indiana

- Date: September 21, 2008
- Game time: 4:15 p.m. EDT
- Game weather: None (retractable roof closed)
- Game attendance: 65,938
- Referee: Walt Coleman
- TV announcers (CBS): Dick Enberg and Randy Cross
- Recap, Game Book

Game information

**First quarter**

- IND – Marvin Harrison 4-yard pass from Peyton Manning (Adam Vinatieri kick), 11:03. Colts 7–0. **Drive: 7 plays, 80 yards, 3:57.**

**Second quarter**

- JAX – Josh Scobee 27-yard field goal, 12:33. Colts 7–3. **Drive: 13 plays, 75 yards, 7:09.**
- JAX – Rashean Mathis 61-yard interception return (Josh Scobee kick), 5:10. Jaguars 10–7.
- IND – Joseph Addai 3-yard run (Adam Vinatieri kick), 1:28. Colts 14–10. **Drive: 11 plays, 74 yards, 3:42.**

**Third quarter**

- JAX – Maurice Jones-Drew 6-yard run (Josh Scobee kick), 1:17. Jaguars 17–14. **Drive: 7 plays, 71 yards, 3:59.**

**Fourth quarter**

- JAX – Josh Scobee 21-yard field goal, 2:33. Jaguars 20–14. **Drive: 18 plays, 82 yards, 12:18.**
- IND – Joseph Addai 2-yard run (Adam Vinatieri kick), 1:07. Colts 21–20. **Drive: 11 plays, 77 yards, 1:26.**
- JAX – Josh Scobee 51-yard field goal, 0:04. Jaguars 23–21. **Drive: 7 plays, 47 yards, 1:03.**

**Top passers**

- JAX – David Garrard – 16/22, 167 yards, INT
- IND – Peyton Manning – 15/29, 216 yards, TD, 2 INT

**Top rushers**

- JAX – Fred Taylor – 26 rushes, 121 yards
- IND – Joseph Addai – 16 rushes, 78 yards, 2 TD

**Top receivers**

- JAX – Maurice Jones-Drew – 4 receptions, 59 yards
- IND – Reggie Wayne – 3 receptions, 74 yards

==== Week 4: vs. Houston Texans ====
Week Four: Houston Texans at Jacksonville Jaguars – Game summary

Quarter	1	2	3	4	OT	Total
Texans	3	7	7	10	0	**27**
**Jaguars**	7	3	7	10	3	**30**

at Jacksonville Municipal Stadium, Jacksonville, Florida

- Date: September 28, 2008
- Game time: 1:00 p.m. EDT
- Game weather: 82 °F (28 °C)
- Game attendance: 64,061
- Referee: John Parry
- TV announcers (CBS): Dick Enberg and Randy Cross
- Recap, Game Book

Game information

**First quarter**

- JAX – Montell Owens 41-yard run (Josh Scobee kick), 8:38. Jaguars 7–0. **Drive: 6 plays, 59 yards, 2:27.**
- HOU – Kris Brown 27-yard field goal, 0:07. Jaguars 7–3. **Drive: 12 plays, 51 yards, 5:30.**

**Second quarter**

- HOU – Steve Slaton 30-yard pass from Matt Schaub (Kris Brown kick), 4:47. Texans 10–7. **Drive: 12 plays, 91 yards, 7:10.**
- JAX – Josh Scobee 46-yard field goal, 0:19. Tied 10–10. **Drive: 9 plays, 47 yards, 4:28.**

**Third quarter**

- JAX – Matt Jones 16-yard pass from David Garrard (Josh Scobee kick), 10:53. Jaguars 17–10. **Drive: 7 plays, 76 yards, 4:07.**
- HOU – Kevin Walter 5-yard pass from Matt Schaub (Kris Brown kick), 5:15. Tied 17–17. **Drive: 11 plays, 80 yards, 5:38.**

**Fourth quarter**

- JAX – Josh Scobee 40-yard field goal, 13:40. Jaguars 20–17. **Drive: 13 plays, 58 yards, 6:35.**
- HOU – Kevin Walter 8-yard pass from Matt Schaub (Kris Brown kick), 7:06. Texans 24–20. **Drive: 11 plays, 85 yards, 6:34.**
- JAX – David Garrard 5-yard run (Josh Scobee kick), 1:48. Jaguars 27–24. **Drive: 13 plays, 62 yards, 5:18.**
- HOU – Kris Brown 47-yard field goal, 0:01. Tied 27–27. **Drive: 9 plays, 53 yards, 1:47.**

**Overtime**

- JAX – Josh Scobee 37-yard field goal, 11:25. Jaguars 30–27. **Drive: 6 plays, 51 yards, 3:35.**

**Top passers**

- HOU – Matt Schaub – 29/40, 307 yards, 3 TD
- JAX – David Garrard – 23/32, 236 yards, TD

**Top rushers**

- HOU – Steve Slaton – 10 rushes, 33 yards
- JAX – David Garrard – 7 rushes, 41 yards, TD

**Top receivers**

- HOU – Owen Daniels – 7 receptions, 87 yards
- JAX – Matt Jones – 5 receptions, 71 yards, TD

==== Week 5: vs. Pittsburgh Steelers ====
Week Five: Pittsburgh Steelers at Jacksonville Jaguars – Game summary

Quarter	1	2	3	4	Total
**Steelers**	7	13	0	6	**26**
Jaguars	14	0	0	7	**21**

at Jacksonville Municipal Stadium, Jacksonville, Florida

- Date: October 5, 2008
- Game time: 8:15 p.m. EDT
- Game weather: 73 °F (23 °C)
- Game attendance: 65,908
- Referee: Ron Winter
- TV announcers (NBC): Al Michaels, John Madden, and Andrea Kremer
- Recap, Game Book

Game information

**First quarter**

- JAX – Rashean Mathis 72-yard interception return (Josh Scobee kick), 12:49. Jaguars 7–0.
- PIT – Heath Miller 1-yard pass from Ben Roethlisberger (Jeff Reed kick), 5:18. Tied 7–7. **Drive: 12 plays, 71 yards, 7:31.**
- JAX – Maurice Jones-Drew 1-yard run (Josh Scobee kick), 2:27. Jaguars 14–7. **Drive: 7 plays, 74 yards, 2:51.**

**Second quarter**

- PIT – Jeff Reed 38-yard field goal, 12:38. Jaguars 14–10. **Drive: 11 plays, 59 yards, 4:49.**
- PIT – Nate Washington 48-yard pass from Ben Roethlisberger (Jeff Reed kick), 9:20. Steelers 17–14. **Drive: 4 plays, 82 yards, 1:57.**
- PIT – Jeff Reed 23-yard field goal, 0:45. Steelers 20–14. **Drive: 10 plays, 66 yards, 2:07.**

**Third quarter**

- No scoring plays.

**Fourth quarter**

- JAX – Marcedes Lewis 24-yard pass from David Garrard (Josh Scobee kick), 14:05 Jaguars 21–20. **Drive: 6 plays, 76 yards, 3:13.**
- PIT – Hines Ward 8-yard pass from Ben Roethlisberger (pass failed), 1:53. Steelers 26–21. **Drive: 11 plays, 80 yards, 4:40.**

**Top passers**

- PIT – Ben Roethlisberger – 26/41, 309 yards, 3 TD, INT
- JAX – David Garrard – 18/32, 200 yards, TD

**Top rushers**

- PIT – Mewelde Moore – 17 rushes, 99 yards
- JAX – Fred Taylor – 10 rushes, 19 yards

**Top receivers**

- PIT – Nate Washington – 6 receptions, 94 yards, TD
- JAX – Mike Sims-Walker – 6 receptions, 107 yards

==== Week 6: at Denver Broncos ====
Week Six: Jacksonville Jaguars at Denver Broncos – Game summary

Quarter	1	2	3	4	Total
**Jaguars**	3	7	14	0	**24**
Broncos	7	0	3	7	**17**

at Invesco Field at Mile High, Denver, Colorado

- Date: October 12, 2008
- Game time: 4:05 p.m. EDT
- Game weather: Cloudy, 43 °F (6 °C)
- Game attendance: 75,674
- Referee: Bill Carollo
- TV announcers (CBS): Greg Gumbel and Dan Dierdorf
- Recap, Game Book

Game information

**First quarter**

- DEN – Brandon Stokley 11-yard pass from Jay Cutler (Matt Prater kick), 9:33. Broncos 7–0. **Drive: 10 plays, 80 yards, 5:27.**
- JAX – Josh Scobee 48-yard field goal, 3:55. Broncos 7–3. **Drive: 6 plays, 18 yards, 2:42.**

**Second quarter**

- JAX – Maurice Jones-Drew 1-yard run (Josh Scobee kick), 2:58. Jaguars 10–7. **Drive: 12 plays, 75 yards, 6:29.**

**Third quarter**

- JAX – Maurice Jones-Drew 46-yard run (Josh Scobee kick), 13:47. Jaguars 17–7. **Drive: 3 plays, 80 yards, 1:13.**
- DEN – Matt Prater 39-yard field goal, 8:40. Jaguars 17–10. **Drive: 13 plays, 59 yards, 5:07.**
- JAX – Marcedes Lewis 30-yard pass from David Garrard (Josh Scobee kick), 3:48. Jaguars 24–10. **Drive: 9 plays, 79 yards, 4:52.**

**Fourth quarter**

- DEN – Daniel Graham 11-yard pass from Jay Cutler (Matt Prater kick), 9:19. Jaguars 24–17. **Drive: 3 plays, 37 yards, 0:51.**

**Top passers**

- JAX – David Garrard – 25/34, 276 yards, TD
- DEN – Jay Cutler – 21/37, 192 yards, 2 TD, INT

**Top rushers**

- JAX – Maurice Jones-Drew – 22 rushes, 125 yards, 2 TD
- DEN – Michael Pittman – 20 rushes, 109 yards

**Top receivers**

- JAX – Matt Jones – 7 receptions, 69 yards
- DEN – Brandon Marshall – 9 receptions, 98 yards

==== Week 8: vs. Cleveland Browns ====
Week Eight: Cleveland Browns at Jacksonville Jaguars – Game summary

Quarter	1	2	3	4	Total
**Browns**	7	10	0	6	**23**
Jaguars	0	7	7	3	**17**

at Jacksonville Municipal Stadium, Jacksonville, Florida

- Date: October 26, 2008
- Game time: 4:05 p.m. EST
- Game weather: 72 °F (22 °C)
- Game attendance: 64,775
- Referee: Alberto Riveron
- TV announcers (CBS): Dick Enberg and Randy Cross
- Recap, Game Book

Game information

**First quarter**

- CLE – Donté Stallworth 3-yard pass from Derek Anderson (Phil Dawson kick), 2:08. Browns 7–0. **Drive: 9 plays, 80 yards, 4:44.**

**Second quarter**

- JAX – Reggie Williams 5-yard pass from David Garrard (Josh Scobee kick), 10:28. Tied 7–7. **Drive: 13 plays, 74 yards, 6:40.**
- CLE – Jamal Lewis 2-yard run (Phil Dawson kick), 0:57. Browns 14–7. **Drive: 6 plays, 62 yards, 3:08.**
- CLE – Phil Dawson 32-yard field goal, 4:09. Browns 17–7. **Drive: 5 plays, 49 yards, 1:47.**

**Third quarter**

- JAX – Matt Jones 8-yard pass from David Garrard (Josh Scobee kick), 10:27. Browns 17–14. **Drive: 9 plays, 72 yards, 4:33.**

**Fourth quarter**

- JAX – Josh Scobee 53-yard field goal, 8:48. Tied 17–17. **Drive: 7 plays, 19 yards, 2:17.**
- CLE – Phil Dawson 20-yard field goal, 4:35. Browns 20–17. **Drive: 10 plays, 21 yards, 4:13.**
- CLE – Phil Dawson 42-yard field goal, 4:11. Browns 23–17. **Drive: 4 plays, 0 yards, 0:21.**

**Top passers**

- CLE – Derek Anderson – 14/27, 246 yards, TD
- JAX – David Garrard – 25/42, 283 yards, 2 TD

**Top rushers**

- CLE – Jamal Lewis – 20 rushes, 81 yards, TD
- JAX – David Garrard – 7 rushes, 59 yards

**Top receivers**

- CLE – Steve Heiden – 3 receptions, 73 yards
- JAX – Matt Jones – 8 receptions, 117 yards, TD

==== Week 9: at Cincinnati Bengals ====
Week Nine: Jacksonville Jaguars at Cincinnati Bengals – Game summary

Quarter	1	2	3	4	Total
Jaguars	0	3	0	16	**19**
**Bengals**	7	7	7	0	**21**

at Paul Brown Stadium, Cincinnati, Ohio

- Date: November 2, 2008
- Game time: 1:00 p.m. EST
- Game weather: Sunny, 66 °F (19 °C)
- Game attendance: 64,238
- Referee: Terry McAulay
- TV announcers (CBS): Gus Johnson, and Steve Tasker
- Recap, Game Book

Game information

**First quarter**

- CIN – Chad Johnson 2-yard pass from Ryan Fitzpatrick (Shayne Graham kick), 2:28. Bengals 7–0. **Drive: 14 plays, 84 yards, 7:51.**

**Second quarter**

- CIN – Chad Johnson 10-yard pass from Ryan Fitzpatrick (Shayne Graham kick), 10:44. Bengals 14–0. **Drive: 10 plays, 88 yards, 4:23.**
- JAX – Josh Scobee 52-yard field goal, 3:05. Bengals 14–3. **Drive: 6 plays, 15 yards, 2:09.**

**Third quarter**

- CIN – Cedric Benson 7-yard run (Shayne Graham kick), 9:15. Bengals 21–3. **Drive: 2 plays, 37 yards, 0:44.**

**Fourth quarter**

- JAX – Josh Scobee 26-yard field goal, 13:27. Bengals 21–6. **Drive: 10 plays, 54 yards, 2:57.**
- JAX – Montell Owens 18-yard fumble return (Josh Scobee kick), 13:17. Bengals 21–13.
- JAX – Maurice Jones-Drew 1-yard run (pass failed), 1:17. Bengals 21–19. **Drive: 11 plays, 73 yards, 4:39.**

**Top passers**

- JAX – David Garrard – 23/38, 229 yards, INT
- CIN – Jay Cutler – 21/31, 162 yards, 2 TD, INT

**Top rushers**

- JAX – Maurice Jones-Drew – 10 rushes, 33 yards, TD
- CIN – Cedric Benson – 24 rushes, 104 yards, TD

**Top receivers**

- JAX – Matt Jones – 7 receptions, 69 yards
- CIN – T.J. Houshmandzadeh – 7 receptions, 65 yards

==== Week 10: at Detroit Lions ====
Week Ten: Jacksonville Jaguars at Detroit Lions – Game summary

Quarter	1	2	3	4	Total
**Jaguars**	3	21	7	7	**38**
Lions	7	0	0	7	**14**

at Ford Field, Detroit, Michigan

- Date: November 9, 2008
- Game time: 1:00 p.m. EST
- Game weather: None (indoor stadium)
- Game attendance: 52,631
- Referee: Carl Cheffers
- TV announcers (CBS): Kevin Harlan and Rich Gannon
- Recap, Game Book

Game information

**First quarter**

- JAX – Josh Scobee 34-yard field goal, 12:37. Jaguars 3–0. **Drive: 4 plays, 7 yards, 1:24.**
- DET – John Owens 1-yard pass from Drew Stanton (Jason Hanson kick), 3:33. Lions 7–3. **Drive: 9 plays, 81 yards, 5:07.**

**Second quarter**

- JAX – Maurice Jones-Drew 6-yard run (Josh Scobee kick), 14:15. Jaguars 10–7. **Drive: 8 plays, 80 yards, 4:18.**
- JAX – Maurice Jones-Drew 1-yard run (Josh Scobee kick), 8:03. Jaguars 17–7. **Drive: 9 plays, 71 yards, 4:27.**
- JAX – Maurice Jones-Drew 8-yard run (Josh Scobee kick), 0:39. Jaguars 24–7. **Drive: 7 plays, 58 yards, 1:39.**

**Third quarter**

- JAX – Jerry Porter 7-yard pass from David Garrard (Josh Scobee kick), 5:40. Jaguars 31–7. **Drive: 15 plays, 83 yards, 9:20.**

**Fourth quarter**

- JAX – Troy Williamson 10-yard pass from David Garrard (Josh Scobee kick), 14:56. Jaguars 38–7. **Drive: 8 plays, 54 yards, 4:18.**
- DET – Kevin Smith 1-yard run (Jason Hanson kick), 6:02. Jaguars 38–14. **Drive: 11 plays, 88 yards, 5:54.**

**Top passers**

- JAX – David Garrard – 18/25, 238 yards, 2 TD
- DET – Daunte Culpepper – 5/10, 104 yards, INT

**Top rushers**

- JAX – Fred Taylor – 18 rushes, 80 yards
- DET – Kevin Smith – 23 rushes, 96 yards, TD

**Top receivers**

- JAX – Marcedes Lewis – 4 receptions, 64 yards
- DET – Calvin Johnson – 2 receptions, 92 yards

==== Week 11: vs. Tennessee Titans ====
Week Eleven: Tennessee Titans at Jacksonville Jaguars – Game summary

Quarter	1	2	3	4	Total
**Titans**	3	0	14	7	**24**
Jaguars	0	14	0	0	**14**

at Jacksonville Municipal Stadium, Jacksonville, Florida

- Date: November 16, 2008
- Game time: 4:15 p.m. EST
- Game weather: 60 °F (16 °C)
- Game attendance: 65,258
- Referee: Walt Coleman
- TV announcers (CBS): Dick Enberg and Randy Cross
- Recap, Game Book

Game information

**First quarter**

- TEN – Rob Bironas 32-yard field goal, 5:27. Titans 3–0. **Drive: 8 plays, 57 yards, 3:36.**

**Second quarter**

- JAX – Maurice Jones-Drew 2-yard run (Josh Scobee kick), 10:11. Jaguars 7–3. **Drive: 11 plays, 74 yards, 6:20.**
- JAX – Maurice Jones-Drew 1-yard run (Josh Scobee kick), 0:14. Jaguars 14–3. **Drive: 5 plays, 37 yards, 0:52.**

**Third quarter**

- TEN – Brandon Jones 13-yard pass from Kerry Collins (Rob Bironas kick), 9:12. Jaguars 14–10. **Drive: 7 plays, 55 yards, 3:25.**
- TEN – Justin Gage 56-yard pass from Kerry Collins (Rob Bironas kick), 7:14. Titans 17–14. **Drive: 3 plays, 63 yards, 0:55.**

**Fourth quarter**

- TEN – Justin Gage 38-yard pass from Kerry Collins (Rob Bironas kick), 3:57. Titans 24–14. **Drive: 4 plays, 51 yards, 1:52.**

**Top passers**

- TEN – Kerry Collins – 13/23, 230 yards, 3 TD, INT
- JAX – David Garrard – 13/30, 135 yards, INT

**Top rushers**

- TEN – Chris Johnson – 17 rushes, 64 yards
- JAX – Maurice Jones-Drew – 17 rushes, 66 yards, 2 TD

**Top receivers**

- TEN – Justin Gage – 4 receptions, 147 yards, 2 TD
- JAX – Dennis Northcutt – 2 receptions, 28 yards

==== Week 12: vs. Minnesota Vikings ====
Week Twelve: Minnesota Vikings at Jacksonville Jaguars – Game summary

Quarter	1	2	3	4	Total
**Vikings**	17	0	3	10	**30**
Jaguars	7	3	0	2	**12**

at Jacksonville Municipal Stadium, Jacksonville, Florida

- Date: November 23, 2008
- Game time: 1:00 p.m. EST
- Game weather: 66 °F (19 °C)
- Game attendance: 65,064
- Referee: John Parry
- TV announcers (Fox): Chris Rose, John Lynch, and Krista Voda
- Recap, Game Book

Game information

**First quarter**

- MIN – Napoleon Harris 27-yard fumble return (Ryan Longwell kick), 14:47. Vikings 7–0.
- MIN – Chester Taylor 3-yard run (Ryan Longwell kick), 13:19. Vikings 14–0. **Drive: 3 plays, 28 yards, 1:21.**
- JAX – Reggie Williams 8-yard pass from David Garrard (Josh Scobee kick), 7:57. Vikings 14–7. **Drive: 4 plays, 27 yards, 1:52.**
- MIN – Ryan Longwell 54-yard field goal, 6:00. Vikings 17–7. **Drive: 5 plays, 19 yards, 1:57.**

**Second quarter**

- JAX – Josh Scobee 21-yard field goal, 12:29. Vikings 17–10. **Drive: 14 plays, 66 yards, 8:31.**

**Third quarter**

- MIN – Ryan Longwell 32-yard field goal, 7:43. Vikings 20–10. **Drive: 7 plays, 23 yards, 4:02.**

**Fourth quarter**

- MIN – Ryan Longwell 22-yard field goal, 13:59. Vikings 23–10. **Drive: 11 plays, 65 yards, 6:28.**
- MIN – Adrian Peterson 16-yard run (Ryan Longwell kick), 6:55. Vikings 30–10. **Drive: 10 plays, 60 yards, 4:58.**
- JAX – Chris Kluwe ran out of bounds in the end zone for a safety, 3:01. Vikings 30–12.

**Top passers**

- MIN – Gus Frerotte – 12/20, 120 yards, INT
- JAX – David Garrard – 27/45, 317 yards, TD, 2 INT

**Top rushers**

- MIN – Adrian Peterson – 17 rushes, 80 yards, TD
- JAX – Fred Taylor – 6 rushes, 20 yards

**Top receivers**

- MIN – Visanthe Shiancoe – 3 receptions, 60 yards
- JAX – Maurice Jones-Drew – 9 receptions, 113 yards

==== Week 13: at Houston Texans ====
Week Thirteen: Jacksonville Jaguars at Houston Texans – Game summary

Quarter	1	2	3	4	Total
Jaguars	0	0	3	14	**17**
**Texans**	10	0	6	14	**30**

at Reliant Stadium, Houston, Texas

- Date: December 1, 2008
- Game time: 8:30 p.m. EST
- Game weather: Clear, 53 °F (12 °C)
- Game attendance: 70,809
- Referee: Scott Green
- TV announcers (ESPN): Mike Tirico, Ron Jaworski, and Tony Kornheiser
- Recap, Game Book

Game information

**First quarter**

- HOU – Andre Johnson 31-yard pass from Sage Rosenfels (Kris Brown kick), 11:55. Texans 7–0. **Drive: 6 plays, 69 yards, 3:05.**
- HOU – Kris Brown 38-yard field goal, 6:29. Texans 10–0. **Drive: 7 plays, 28 yards, 3:03.**

**Second quarter**

- No scoring plays.

**Third quarter**

- HOU – Kris Brown 50-yard field goal, 10:12. Texans 13–0. **Drive: 4 plays, 6 yards, 1:54.**
- JAX – Josh Scobee 29-yard field goal, 3:29. Texans 13–3. **Drive: 12 plays, 69 yards, 6:43.**
- HOU – Kris Brown 20-yard field goal, 0:46. Texans 16–3. **Drive: 5 plays, 40 yards, 2:43.**

**Fourth quarter**

- HOU – Steve Slaton 7-yard run (Kris Brown kick), 4:35. Texans 23–3. **Drive: 1 play, 7 yards, 0:04.**
- JAX – Fred Taylor 4-yard run (Josh Scobee kick), 2:11. Texans 23–10. **Drive: 8 plays, 73 yards, 2:24.**
- HOU – Steve Slaton 40-yard run (Kris Brown kick), 2:04. Texans 30–10. **Drive: 1 play, 40 yards, 0:07.**
- JAX – Reggie Williams 18-yard pass from David Garrard (Josh Scobee kick), 0:39. Texans 30–17. **Drive: 5 plays, 63 yards, 1:25.**

**Top passers**

- JAX – David Garrard – 25/35, 287 yards, TD, INT
- HOU – Sage Rosenfels – 14/24, 200 yards, TD, NT

**Top rushers**

- JAX – Fred Taylor – 9 rushes, 67 yards, TD
- HOU – Steve Slaton – 21 rushes, 130 yards, 2 TD

**Top receivers**

- JAX – Matt Jones – 8 receptions, 104 yards
- HOU – Andre Johnson – 7 receptions, 75 yards, TD

==== Week 14: at Chicago Bears ====
Week Fourteen: Jacksonville Jaguars at Chicago Bears – Game summary

Quarter	1	2	3	4	Total
Jaguars	3	0	0	7	**10**
**Bears**	10	10	0	3	**23**

at Soldier Field, Chicago, Illinois

- Date: December 7, 2008
- Game time: 12:00 p.m. CST
- Game weather: Mostly cloudy, 19 °F (−7 °C)
- Game attendance: 61,736
- Referee: Bill Carollo
- TV announcers (CBS): Greg Gumbel and Dan Dierdorf
- Recap, Game Book

Game information

**First quarter**

- CHI – Desmond Clark 2-yard pass from Kyle Orton (Robbie Gould kick), 12:36. Bears 7–0. **Drive: 2 plays, 5 yards, 0:37.**
- JAX – Josh Scobee 42-yard field goal, 6:28. Bears 7–3. **Drive: 12 plays, 51 yards, 6:08.**
- CHI – Robbie Gould 22-yard field goal, 0:19. Bears 10–3. **Drive: 13 plays, 82 yards, 6:09.**

**Second quarter**

- CHI – Robbie Gould 36-yard field goal, 2:44. Bears 13–3. **Drive: 4 plays, 4 yards, 2:09.**
- CHI – Greg Olsen 22-yard pass from Kyle Orton (Robbie Gould kick), 0:18. Bears 20–3. **Drive: 7 plays, 73 yards, 0:59.**

**Third quarter**

- No scoring plays.

**Fourth quarter**

- JAX – Maurice Jones-Drew 4-yard pass from David Garrard (Josh Scobee kick), 12:09. Bears 20–10. **Drive: 9 plays, 76 yards, 3:32.**
- CHI – Robbie Gould 35-yard field goal, 8:58. Bears 23–10. **Drive: 7 plays, 55 yards, 3:11.**

**Top passers**

- JAX – David Garrard – 19/38, 178 yards, TD, INT
- CHI – Kyle Orton – 20/34, 219 yards, 2 TD, NT

**Top rushers**

- JAX – Maurice Jones-Drew – 12 rushes, 55 yards
- CHI – Matt Forte – 21 rushes, 69 yards

**Top receivers**

- JAX – Maurice Jones-Drew – 7 receptions, 47 yards, TD
- CHI – Devin Hester – 5 receptions, 80 yards

==== Week 15: vs. Green Bay Packers ====
Week Fifteen: Green Bay Packers at Jacksonville Jaguars – Game summary

Quarter	1	2	3	4	Total
Packers	3	10	0	3	**16**
**Jaguars**	7	0	0	13	**20**

at Jacksonville Municipal Stadium, Jacksonville, Florida

- Date: December 14, 2008
- Game time: 1:00 p.m. EST
- Game weather: 67 °F (19 °C)
- Game attendance: 65,457
- Referee: Jerome Boger
- TV announcers (Fox): Ron Pitts, Tony Boselli, and Charissa Thompson
- Recap, Game Book

Game information

**First quarter**

- JAX – Dennis Northcutt 30-yard pass from David Garrard (Josh Scobee kick), 8:03. Jaguars 7–0. **Drive: 12 plays, 73 yards, 6:57.**
- GB – Mason Crosby 22-yard field goal, 2:33. Jaguars 7–3. **Drive: 11 plays, 79 yards, 5:30.**

**Second quarter**

- GB – Greg Jennings 4-yard pass from Aaron Rodgers (Mason Crosby kick), 8:33. Packers 10–7. **Drive: 10 plays, 59 yards, 6:02.**
- GB – Mason Crosby 23-yard field goal, 1:18. Packers 13–7. **Drive: 9 plays, 75 yards, 2:44.**

**Third quarter**

- No scoring plays.

**Fourth quarter**

- JAX – Maurice Jones-Drew 14-yard pass from David Garrard (Josh Scobee kick), 10:39. Jaguars 14–13. **Drive: 9 plays, 56 yards, 4:15.**
- GB – Mason Crosby 38-yard field goal, 5:35. Packers 16–14. **Drive: 9 plays, 54 yards, 5:04.**
- JAX – Maurice Jones-Drew 2-yard run (run failed), 1:56. Jaguars 20–16. **Drive: 6 plays, 80 yards, 3:39.**

**Top passers**

- GB – Aaron Rodgers – 20/32, 278 yards, TD, INT
- JAX – David Garrard – 21/33, 238 yards, 2 TD

**Top rushers**

- GB – Ryan Grant – 21 rushes, 56 yards
- JAX – Maurice Jones-Drew – 12 rushes, 48 yards

**Top receivers**

- GB – James Jones – 4 receptions, 132 yards
- JAX – Dennis Northcutt – 5 receptions, 127 yards, TD

==== Week 16: vs. Indianapolis Colts ====
Week Sixteen: Indianapolis Colts at Jacksonville Jaguars – Game summary

Quarter	1	2	3	4	Total
**Colts**	0	7	7	17	**31**
Jaguars	7	10	7	0	**24**

at Jacksonville Municipal Stadium, Jacksonville, Florida

- Date: December 18, 2008
- Game time: 8:15 p.m. EST
- Game weather: 66 °F (19 °C)
- Game attendance: 65,648
- Referee: Walt Anderson
- TV announcers (NFLN): Bob Papa and Cris Collinsworth
- Recap, Game Book

Game information

**First quarter**

- JAX – Dennis Northcutt 28-yard pass from David Garrard (Josh Scobee kick), 10:59. Jaguars 7–0. **Drive: 8 plays, 62 yards, 4:01.**

**Second quarter**

- JAX – David Garrard 2-yard run (Josh Scobee kick), 11:37. Jaguars 14–0. **Drive: 17 plays, 93 yards, 9:35.**
- IND – Reggie Wayne 41-yard pass from Peyton Manning (Adam Vinatieri kick), 8:39. Jaguars 14–7. **Drive: 5 plays, 63 yards, 2:58.**
- JAX – Josh Scobee 44-yard field goal, 0:01. Jaguars 17–7. **Drive: 8 plays, 54 yards, 1:02.**

**Third quarter**

- IND – Dominic Rhodes 10-yard pass from Peyton Manning (Adam Vinatieri kick), 10:26. Jaguars 17–14. **Drive: 9 plays, 75 yards, 4:34.**
- JAX – Montell Owens 2-yard run (Josh Scobee kick), 2:28. Jaguars 24–14. **Drive: 14 plays, 76 yards, 7:58.**

**Fourth quarter**

- IND – Dallas Clark 1-yard pass from Peyton Manning (Adam Vinatieri kick), 12:31. Jaguars 24–21. **Drive: 11 plays, 81 yards, 4:57.**
- IND – Adam Vinatieri 45-yard field goal, 6:28. Tied 24–24. **Drive: 10 plays, 52 yards, 4:55.**
- IND – Keiwan Ratliff 35-yard interception return (Adam Vinatieri kick), 4:48. Colts 31–24.

**Top passers**

- IND – Peyton Manning – 29/34, 364 yards, 3 TD
- JAX – David Garrard – 28/41, 329 yards, TD, INT

**Top rushers**

- IND – Dominic Rhodes – 14 rushes, 27 yards
- JAX – Maurice Jones-Drew – 20 rushes, 91 yards

**Top receivers**

- IND – Reggie Wayne – 7 receptions, 108 yards
- JAX – Dennis Northcutt – 8 receptions, 101 yards, TD

==== Week 17: at Baltimore Ravens ====
Week Seventeen: Jacksonville Jaguars at Baltimore Ravens – Game summary

Quarter	1	2	3	4	Total
Jaguars	7	0	0	0	**7**
**Ravens**	3	21	3	0	**27**

at M&T Bank Stadium, Baltimore, Maryland

- Date: December 28, 2008
- Game time: 4:15 p.m. EST
- Game weather: Cloudy, 62 °F (17 °C)
- Game attendance: 71,366
- Referee: Alberto Riveron
- TV announcers (CBS): Dick Enberg and Randy Cross
- Recap, Game Book

Game information

**First quarter**

- BAL – Matt Stover 32-yard field goal, 9:25. Ravens 3–0. **Drive: 10 plays, 65 yards, 5:35.**
- JAX – Alvin Pearman 23-yard pass from David Garrard (Josh Scobee kick), 0:48. Jaguars 7–3. **Drive: 5 plays, 50 yards, 2:14.**

**Second quarter**

- TEN – Le'Ron McClain 5-yard run (Matt Stover kick), 10:58. Ravens 10–7. **Drive: 10 plays, 78 yards, 4:50.**
- TEN – Willis McGahee 13-yard run (Matt Stover kick), 4:52. Ravens 17–7. **Drive: 8 plays, 77 yards, 4:20.**
- TEN – Le'Ron McClain 1-yard run (Matt Stover kick), 0:44. Ravens 24–7. **Drive: 6 plays, 71 yards, 1:21.**

**Third quarter**

- BAL – Matt Stover 41-yard field goal, 3:26. Ravens 27–7. **Drive: 8 plays, 58 yards, 3:54.**

**Fourth quarter**

- No scoring plays.

**Top passers**

- JAX – David Garrard – 14/25, 127 yards, TD, 2 INT
- BAL – Joe Flacco – 17/23, 297 yards

**Top rushers**

- JAX – Maurice Jones-Drew – 23 rushes, 78 yards
- BAL – Le'Ron McClain – 25 rushes, 70 yards, 2 TD

**Top receivers**

- JAX – Dennis Northcutt – 5 receptions, 35 yards
- BAL – Derrick Mason – 6 receptions, 77 yards

=== Standings ===
==== Division ====
AFC South
	W	L	T	PCT	DIV	CONF	PF	PA	STK
^{(1)} Tennessee Titans	13	3	0	.813	4–2	9–3	375	234	L1
^{(5)} Indianapolis Colts	12	4	0	.750	4–2	10–2	377	298	W9
Houston Texans	8	8	0	.500	2–4	5–7	366	394	W1
Jacksonville Jaguars	5	11	0	.313	2–4	3–9	302	367	L2

==== Conference ====
AFC
#	Team	Division	W	L	T	PCT	DIV	CONF	SOS	SOV	STK
**Division leaders**
1	Tennessee Titans	South	13	3	0	.813	4–2	9–3	.459	.425	L1
2	Pittsburgh Steelers	North	12	4	0	.750	6–0	10–2	.525	.458	W1
3 (Note: Miami finished ahead of New England in the AFC East based on better conference record.)	Miami Dolphins	East	11	5	0	.688	4–2	8–4	.461	.398	W5
4 (Note: San Diego finished ahead of Denver in the AFC West based on better division record.)	San Diego Chargers	West	8	8	0	.500	5–1	7–5	.516	.398	W4
**Wild Cards**
5	Indianapolis Colts	South	12	4	0	.750	4–2	10–2	.498	.492	W9
6 (Note: Baltimore clinched the AFC #6 seed over New England based on better conference record.)	Baltimore Ravens	North	11	5	0	.688	4–2	8–4	.521	.412	W2
**Did not qualify for the postseason**
7	New England Patriots	East	11	5	0	.688	4–2	7–5	.480	.403	W4
8	New York Jets	East	9	7	0	.563	4–2	7–5	.471	.462	L2
9 (Note: Houston finished ahead of Denver based on better winning percentage vs. common opponents (3–2 against 2–3 vs. Miami, Oakland, Jacksonville and Cleveland).)	Houston Texans	South	8	8	0	.500	2–4	5–7	.518	.410	W1
10	Denver Broncos	West	8	8	0	.500	3–3	5–7	.457	.438	L3
11	Buffalo Bills	East	7	9	0	.438	0–6	5–7	.453	.304	L1
12 (Note: Oakland finished ahead of Jacksonville based on better conference record.)	Oakland Raiders	West	5	11	0	.313	2–4	4–8	.520	.450	W2
13	Jacksonville Jaguars	South	5	11	0	.313	2–4	3–9	.537	.425	L2
14	Cincinnati Bengals	North	4	11	1	.281	1–5	3–9	.553	.297	W3
15	Cleveland Browns	North	4	12	0	.250	1–5	3–9	.572	.445	L6
16	Kansas City Chiefs	West	2	14	0	.125	2–4	2–10	.537	.406	L4
**Tiebreakers** (Note: When breaking ties for three or more teams under the NFL's rules, they are first broken within divisions, then comparing only the highest ranked remaining team from each division.)
