= Roddrick Muckelroy =

American football player (born 1986)

No. 56
- Position: Linebacker

Personal information
- Born: October 27, 1986 (age 40); Longview, Texas, U.S.
- Listed height: 6 ft 2 in (1.88 m)
- Listed weight: 236 lb (107 kg)

Career information
- High school: Hallsville (Hallsville, Texas)
- College: Texas
- NFL draft: 2010: 4th round, 131st overall pick

Career history
- Cincinnati Bengals (2010–2012); Washington Redskins (2012)

Awards and highlights
- 2× Second-team All-Big 12 (2008, 2009)

Career NFL statistics
- Total tackles: 11
- Forced fumbles: 2
- Stats at Pro Football Reference

Roddrick Muckelroy (born October 27, 1986) is an American former professional football player who was a linebacker in the National Football League (NFL). He was selected by the Cincinnati Bengals in the fourth round of the 2010 NFL draft. He played college football for the Texas Longhorns. Prior to that he attended Hallsville High School.

== College career ==
Muckelroy graduated ther University of Texas at Austin in December 2008 with a degree in corporate communications. In the 2008 season, he led the Longhorns in tackles with 114.

== Professional career ==
=== Cincinnati Bengals ===
He was selected in the fourth round of the 2010 NFL Draft with the 131st overall pick.

During the team's first training camp practice in 2011, Muckelroy ruptured his Achilles tendon, ending his season. Just before the start of the 2012 regular season, Muckelroy was released in favor of undrafted Linebacker Vontaze Burfict.

Muckelroy was re-signed by the Bengals on September 14 after Linebacker Thomas Howard was placed on injured reserve, but was released again shortly thereafter.

=== Washington Redskins ===
Muckelroy was signed by the Washington Redskins on November 26, 2012. He was released in August 2013.

== Personal life ==
Muckelroy is the cousin of former NFL player, Joe King.
