= DeCori Birmingham =

American gridiron football player (born 1982)

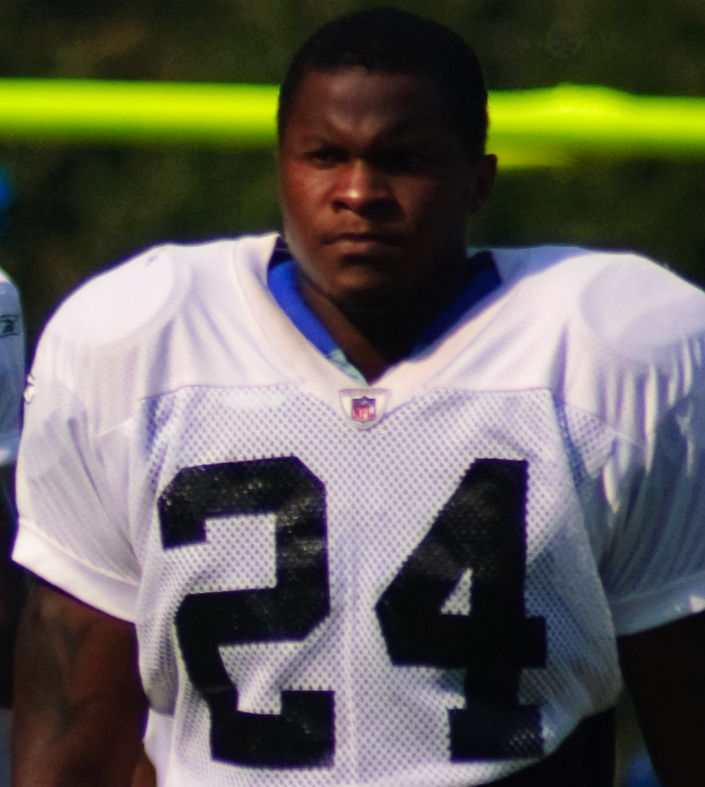
- Birmingham in 2009

No. 24, 40
- Position: Running back

Personal information
- Born: November 22, 1982 (age 43); Atlanta, Texas, U.S.
- Listed height: 5 ft 10 in (1.78 m)
- Listed weight: 210 lb (95 kg)

Career information
- College: Arkansas
- NFL draft: 2005: undrafted

Career history
- New England Patriots (2005)*; New York Jets (2005)*; San Francisco 49ers (2006)*; New York Giants (2006–2007)*; Frankfurt Galaxy (2007)*; Indianapolis Colts (2007)*; Carolina Panthers (2007–2009)*; Toronto Argonauts (2010)*
- * Offseason or practice squad member only

DeCori Birmingham (born November 22, 1982) is a former professional gridiron football running back. He was signed by the New England Patriots as an undrafted free agent in 2005. He played college football at Arkansas.

Birmingham was also a member of the New York Jets, San Francisco 49ers, New York Giants, Frankfurt Galaxy, Indianapolis Colts and Carolina Panthers.

On March 25, 2010, Birmingham signed with the Toronto Argonauts of the Canadian Football League. On June 9, 2010, Birmingham retired from professional football.

DeCori is best known for his part in the "Miracle on Markham". During his sophomore season with the Arkansas Razorbacks in 2002, Arkansas trailed the LSU Tigers 20–14 with less than a minute remaining. The winner of this regular-season finale would win the SEC West Division championship, and earn the right to play in the 2002 SEC Championship Game. Birmingham, despite being covered by two defenders, caught a touchdown pass from quarterback Matt Jones with only 9 seconds remaining in the game, and the extra point gave Arkansas a 21–20 victory. War Memorial Stadium is on Markham Street in Little Rock. Birmingham was also a part of the 2003 Razorbacks team that upset the Texas Longhorns in Austin and won the 2003 Independence Bowl.

After retiring from pro football, Birmingham became a Texas State Trooper. He was recently given the Texas Department of Safety's 2015 Trooper of the Year Award.
