= Hallsville Independent School District =

School district in Texas

Hallsville ISD

Location
- Hallsville, Texas; United States

District information
- Type: Public School
- Motto: "Pursuing Excellence in Education"
- Superintendent: John Martin
- Asst. superintendent(s): Mary Brown (Finance); Shauna Hittle (Academic Leadership)
- School board: Shane Goswick (Place 1); Doug McGarvey (Place 2 & Assistant Board Secretary); Matt Folmar (Place 4); Jason Ainsworth (Place 5); Troy Crafton (place 6 & Board Secretary); Dale Haney (Place 7 & Board Vice President)
- Chair of the board: Jay Nelson (Place 3)

Students and staff
- District mascot: Bobcat
- Colors: Purple and White

Hallsville Independent School District is a public school district based in Hallsville, Texas, United States.

In addition to Hallsville, the district serves a small portion of Longview, as well as rural areas in western Harrison County.

In 2009, the school district was rated "academically acceptable" by the Texas Education Agency.

In 2010, the entire school district was rated "exemplary" by the Texas Education Agency.

HISD is a "district of innovation" or DOI. A DOI is "traditional independent school districts most of the flexibilities available to Texas' open-enrollment charter schools. To access these flexibilities, a school district must adopt an innovation plan, as set forth in Texas Education Code chapter 12A."

== Schools ==
- Hallsville High School (grades 9-12)
- Hallsville Junior High School (grades 7-8)
- Hallsville Intermediate School 6 (grade 6)
- Hallsville Intermediate School 5 (grade 5)
- Hallsville West Elementary School (ECD/prekindergarten-grade 4)
- Hallsville East Elementary School (ECD/prekindergarten-grade 4)
- Hallsville North Elementary School (ECD/prekindergarten-grade 4)

In the fall of 2022, Hallsville West Elementary opened, initially at the Intermediate 5th Grade campus, moving to its permanent facility in 2023. The price tag of the building was around $27 million. The construction process started in 2021. The area of the building is 91,362 square feet (8,487.8 m^{2}).
