= Kroger Field =

Stadium at the University of Kentucky

- C. M. Newton Grounds
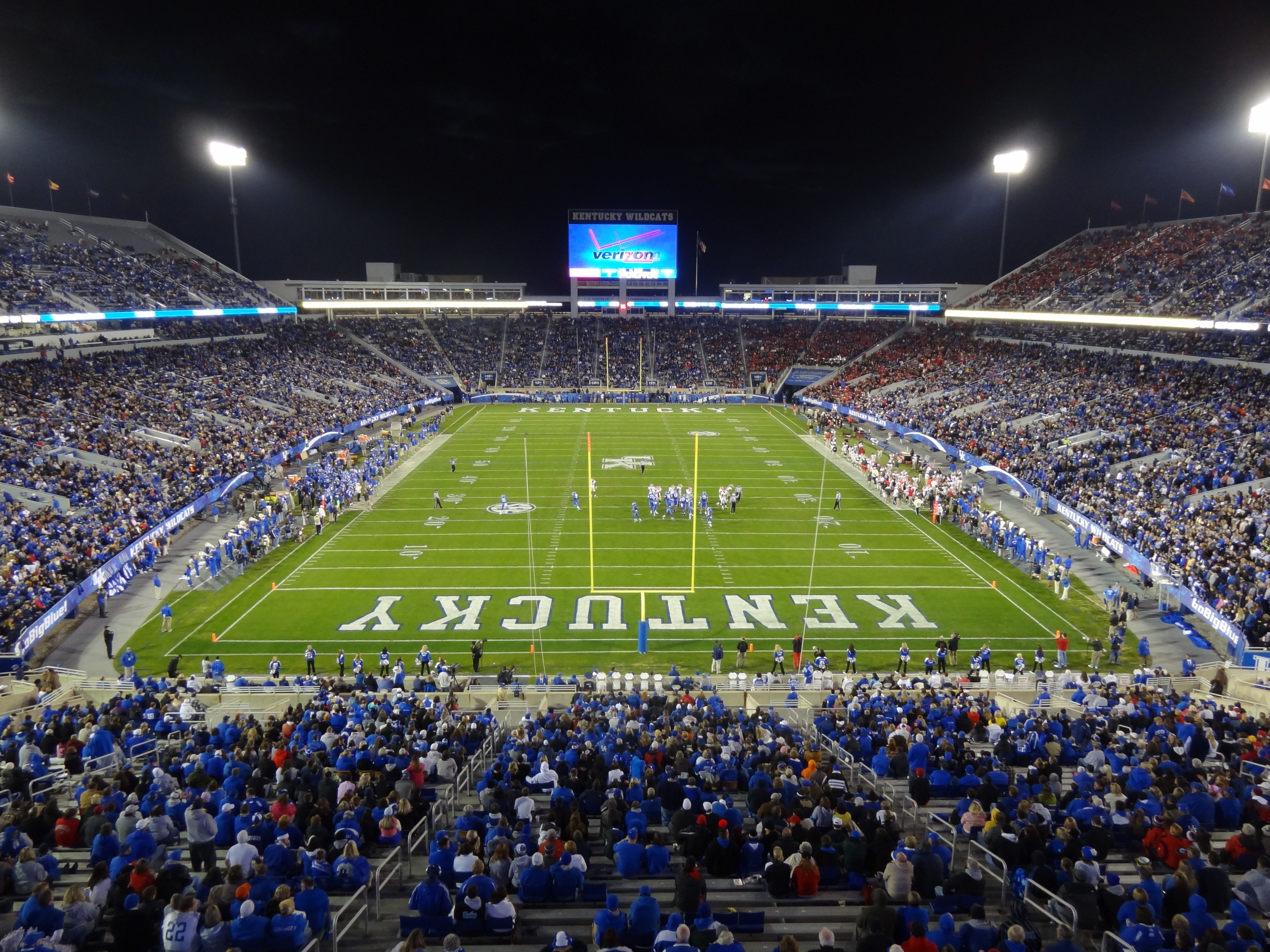
- The stadium during a night game, Kentucky v Georgia, 2012

- Location in Kentucky Location in the United States
- Interactive map of Kroger Field
- Former names: Commonwealth Stadium (1973–2017)
- Location: 1540 University Drive; Lexington, Kentucky 40506
- Coordinates: 38°1′22″N 84°30′19″W
- Owner: University of Kentucky
- Operator: University of Kentucky
- Capacity: 61,000 (2015–present) Former capacity: List: 62,093 (2014); 67,942 (2009–2013); 67,606 (2003–2008); 67,530 (1999–2002); 55,453 (1998); 57,800 (1991–1997); 56,696 (1979–1990); 58,000 (1973–1978)
- Surface: S5 Synthetic Turf (2015–present); Kentucky bluegrass (1973–2014)

Construction
- Groundbreaking: July 23, 1972
- Opened: September 15, 1973; 53 years ago
- Renovated: 2015
- Expanded: 1999
- Cost: $12 million ($87 million in 2025 dollars)
- Architects: HNTB; RossTarrant Architects
- General contractor: Huber, Hunt & Nichols

Tenant
- Kentucky Wildcats (NCAA) 1973–present

Website
- ukathletics.com/kroger-field

Kroger Field, also known as Commonwealth Stadium, is a stadium in Lexington, Kentucky, United States, located on the campus of the University of Kentucky that primarily serves as the home field for the Kentucky Wildcats football team. The stadium is located at the corner of Alumni Drive and University Drive in Lexington. The playing surface is named C. M. Newton Grounds in honor of the late UK athletic director and former baseball and basketball player C. M. Newton. Built in 1973, it is the newest football stadium in the Southeastern Conference, as measured by date of original construction. The original capacity for the stadium was 57,800. In the stadium's first game, played on September 15, 1973, the Wildcats defeated the Virginia Tech Hokies 31–26.

== History ==
Since 1999, fireworks have been shot from atop the suites whenever the Wildcats take the field, as well as after every Wildcat score and win.

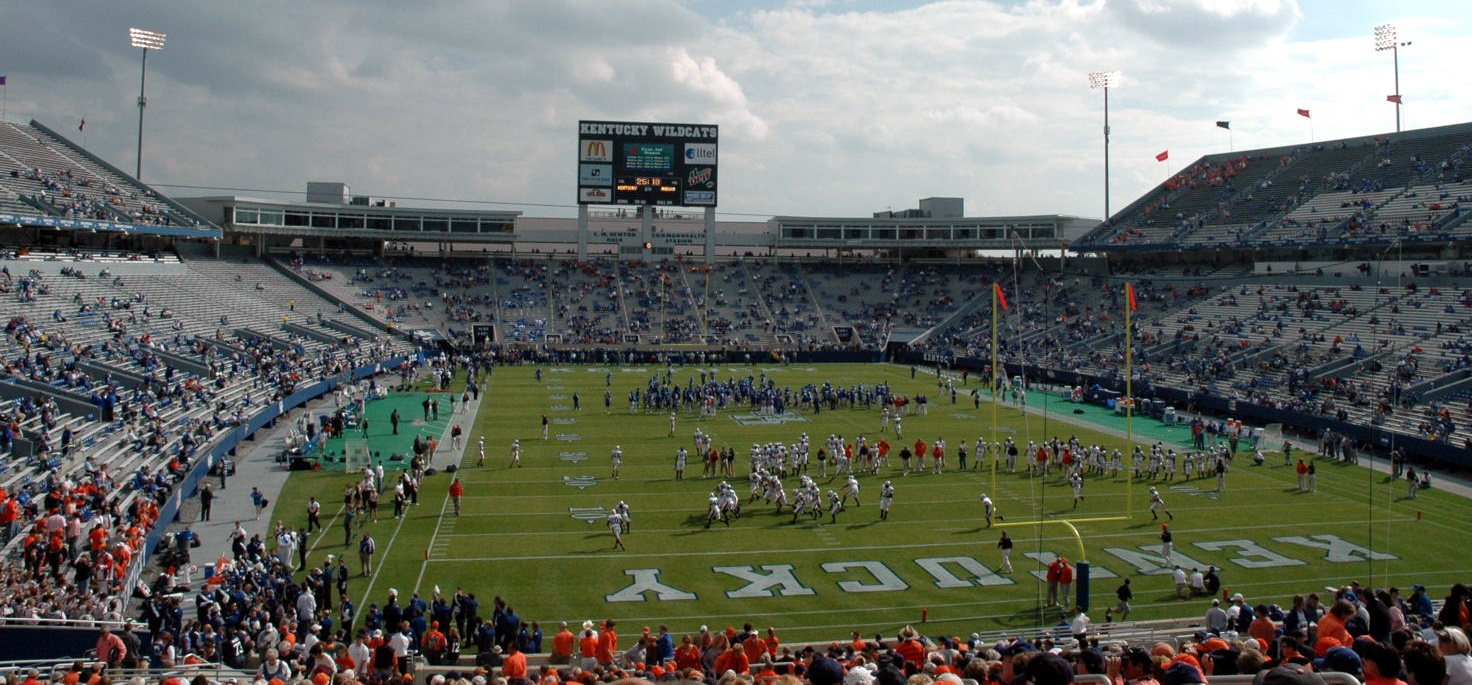
Pregame of 2005 Kentucky vs. Auburn game

=== Renovations ===
Both ends of the stadium were enclosed in 1999 and 40 suites were added, 10 in each corner of the stadium, resulting in a symmetrical oval bowl seating 67,530. The total cost of the expansion was $27.6 million. Seating adjustments over the next decade brought capacity to 67,942. During the 1999 season, Kentucky's average home attendance for football games was 67,756. Attendance for the game against Tennessee that year was 71,022, which remained the record attendance until the Wildcats' 2007 game against Florida drew 71,024. For much of the next decade, Wildcat football games frequently attracted crowds in excess of 70,000.

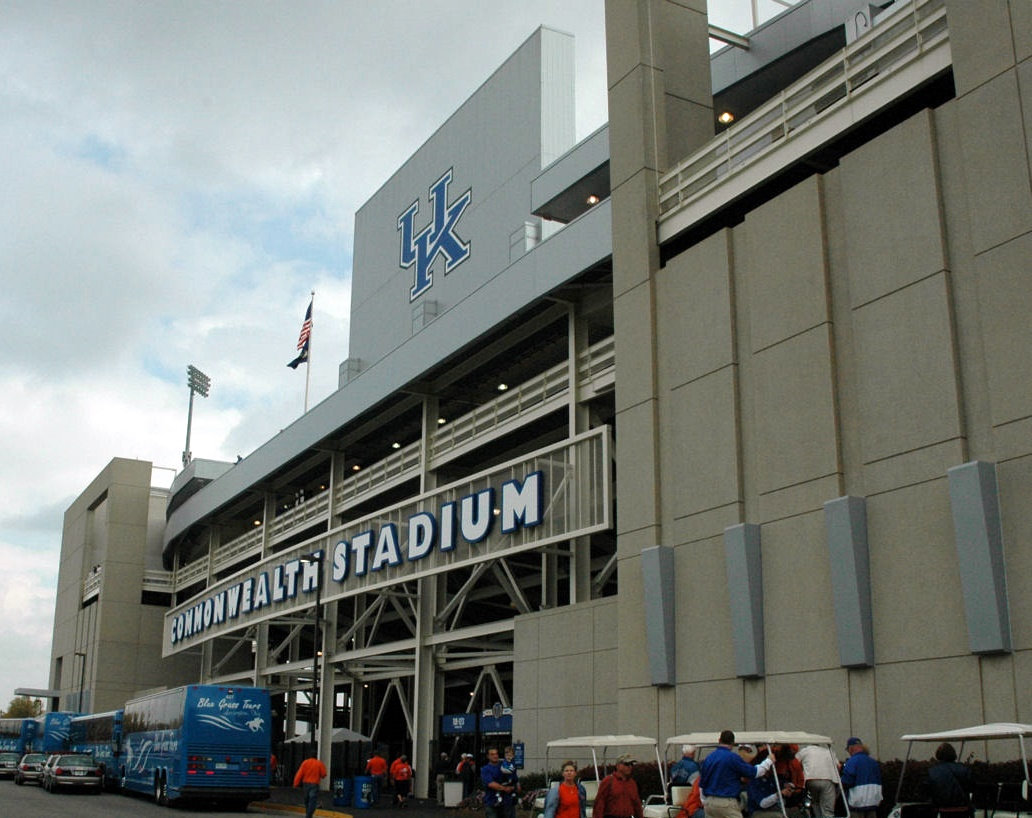
Exterior view, 2005

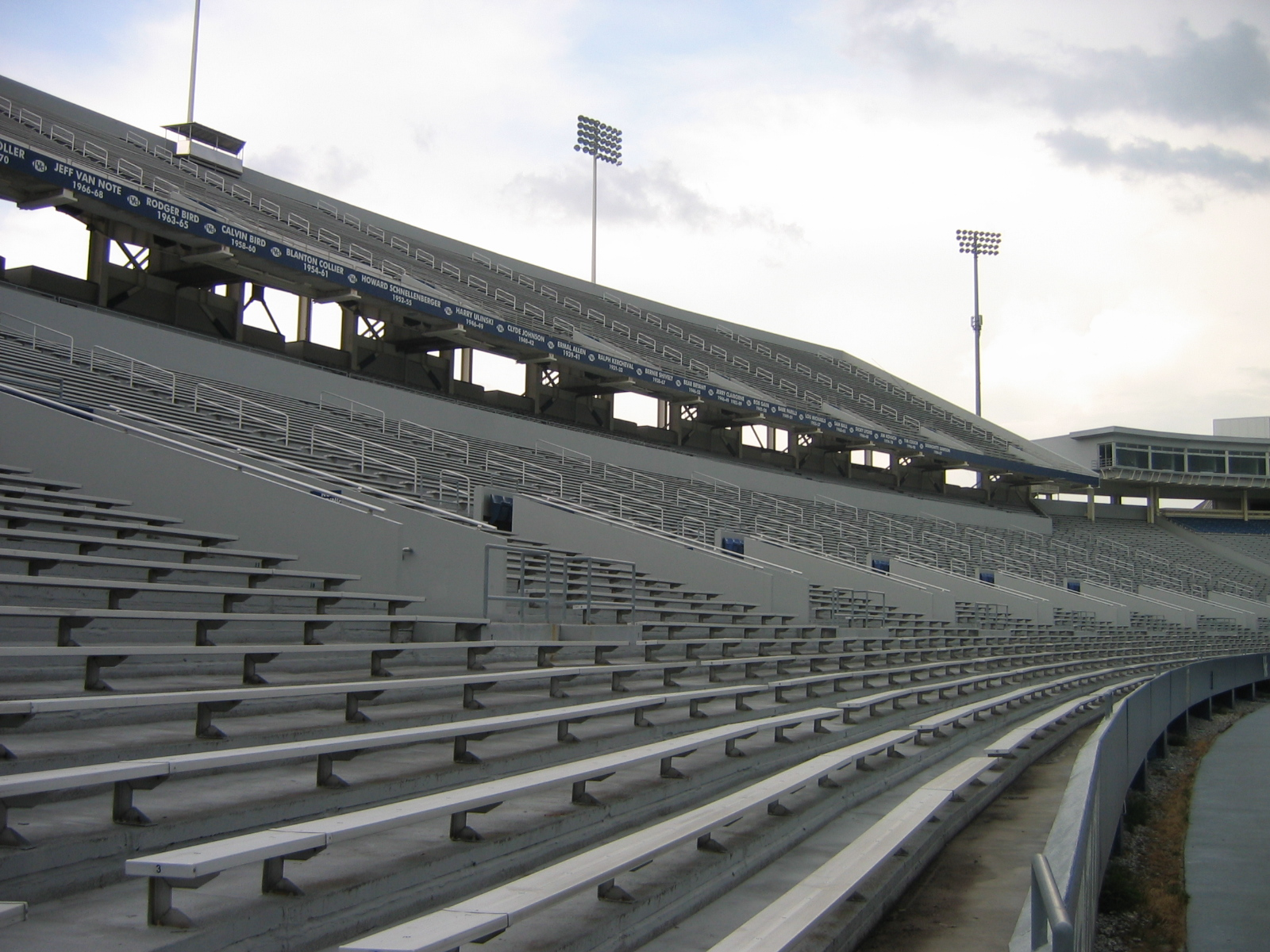
Grandstands in 2008

The University of Kentucky announced an audio and video upgrade to the stadium in July 2011. These upgrades included two LED video boards each measuring approximately 37 feet (11 m) high by 80 feet (24 m) wide (2,960 square feet), making each display the 20th-largest scoreboard in the country. Combined, the 5,920 square feet (550 m^{2}) make the new video boards one of the largest scoreboard systems in the country. Additionally, a new custom audio system and over 1,800 linear sq/ft of video ribbon board were implemented by September 10, 2011. The approximate cost of the upgrades totaled close to $6 million.

The stadium underwent a $110 million renovation in 2015. The renovation included a new press box, loge box seats, club seats, recruiting room, suites, concourses, bathrooms, lights, and exterior facade while reducing capacity to around 61,000. The project was completed before the start of the 2015 season. It was referred to as "The New Commonwealth Stadium". On May 1, 2017, the university, along with marketing partner JMI Sports, announced the stadium's name change to Kroger Field, part of a 12-year, $1.85 million per year naming rights deal with Cincinnati-based retailer Kroger. This agreement makes the University of Kentucky the first school in the Southeastern Conference to enter into a corporate partnership for the naming rights to their football stadium.

In 2022, as part of a $30 million athletics facilities project, new video boards were installed measuring 37 feet (11m) high by 100 feet (30m) wide, along with significant upgrades to the adjacent Nutter Field House, the team's indoor practice facility. In 2023, a new turf playing surface was installed, replacing the existing one installed in 2015. In 2024, as part of another $7 million upgrade, new video ribbon boards and LED stadium lights were installed, the latter of which allows for light shows to be performed during breaks and after scores, enhancing the fan experience.

=== KHSAA Football Championship ===
Since 2017, Kroger Field has been the site for Kentucky's high school football championship games. The event was moved from Western Kentucky University's Houchens Industries–L. T. Smith Stadium due to conflicts with WKU's hosting of two recent Conference USA championship games (2015 and 2016), which led to rescheduling of high school title games on short notice. The 2017 championships were the first held in Lexington since 1976.

== Concerts ==
The stadium hosted no concerts in its first 47 years of use. The first concert was scheduled for 2020. Due to the COVID-19 pandemic, the concert was rescheduled and took place on April 24, 2022. The concert featured Chris Stapleton, Willie Nelson, and Sheryl Crow.

== See also ==
- Bluegrass Miracle
- 2003 Arkansas vs. Kentucky football game, a game at Commonwealth that took seven overtime periods to decide
- Stoll Field/McLean Stadium
- List of NCAA Division I FBS football stadiums
- List of American football stadiums by capacity
- Lists of stadiums
