= Clint Ingram =

American football player (born 1983)

No. 51
- Position: Linebacker

Personal information
- Born: March 21, 1983 (age 43); Hallsville, Texas, U.S.
- Listed height: 6 ft 2 in (1.88 m)
- Listed weight: 240 lb (109 kg)

Career information
- High school: Hallsville
- College: Oklahoma
- NFL draft: 2006: 3rd round, 80th overall pick

Career history
- Jacksonville Jaguars (2006–2009); New Orleans Saints (2010)

Awards and highlights
- Second-team All-Big 12 (2005)

Career NFL statistics
- Total tackles: 193
- Sacks: 5.5
- Forced fumbles: 1
- Interceptions: 2
- Defensive touchdowns: 1
- Stats at Pro Football Reference

Clint Ingram (born March 21, 1983) is an American former professional football player who was a linebacker for six seasons in the National Football League from 2006 to 2011, playing for the Jacksonville Jaguars and New Orleans Saints. He played college football for the Oklahoma Sooners, and was selected by Jacksonville in the third round of the 2006 NFL draft.

== Early life ==
Ingram was born in Hallsville, Texas, and is the nephew of NFL runningback Robert Newhouse. Ingram attended the University of Oklahoma, where he played for the Oklahoma Sooners football team. At the end of the 2005 Holiday Bowl in San Diego, Ingram intercepted a pass from University of Oregon reserve quarterback Brady Leaf in the final seconds of the game, virtually sealing victory in the game for the Sooners.

== Professional career ==
Pre-draft measurables
Height	Weight	Arm length	Hand span	40-yard dash	10-yard split	20-yard split	20-yard shuttle	Three-cone drill	Vertical jump	Broad jump	Bench press
6 ft 1 3/4 in (1.87 m)	244 lb (111 kg)	32 in (0.81 m)	9 7/8 in (0.25 m)	4.66 s	1.63 s	2.73 s	4.10 s	7.12 s	41 in (1.04 m)	9 ft 6 in (2.90 m)	22 reps
Broad jump from Pro Day; all other values from NFL Combine.

Ingram was picked by the Jacksonville Jaguars in the third round of the 2006 NFL draft with the 80th overall pick. His draft preparation with IMG was chronicled in the film Two Days in April. He played with Jacksonville until 2009, when he was released.

On May 19, 2010, the New Orleans Saints announced that they had signed him to a one-year contract. Ingram was recovering from a prior knee injury when he signed, and was designated as physically unable to perform. His recovery did not proceed as quickly as expected, he was unable to practice with the team during training camp or the regular season, and the Saints eventually released him on October 20, 2010.

== NFL career statistics ==
Legend
**Bold**	Career high

=== Regular season ===
Year	Team	Games		Tackles					Interceptions					Fumbles			
Year	Team	GP	GS	Cmb	Solo	Ast	Sck	TFL	Int	Yds	TD	Lng	PD	FF	FR	Yds	TD
2006	JAX	14	11	**71**	**55**	**16**	1.5	3	**1**	0	0	0	**3**	0	0	0	0
2007	JAX	13	11	33	29	4	1.0	2	**1**	**39**	**1**	**39**	1	0	0	0	0
2008	JAX	**16**	**12**	37	32	5	**2.0**	**6**	0	0	0	0	0	**1**	0	0	0
2009	JAX	13	**12**	52	42	10	1.0	5	0	0	0	0	0	0	0	0	0
		56	46	193	158	35	5.5	16	2	39	1	39	4	1	0	0	0

=== Playoffs ===
Year	Team	Games		Tackles					Interceptions					Fumbles			
Year	Team	GP	GS	Cmb	Solo	Ast	Sck	TFL	Int	Yds	TD	Lng	PD	FF	FR	Yds	TD
2007	JAX	**2**	**1**	**12**	**8**	**4**	0.0	**1**	0	0	0	0	**1**	0	0	0	0
		2	1	12	8	4	0.0	1	0	0	0	0	1	0	0	0	0
