= Richard Collier =

American football player (born 1981)

No. 76
- Position: Offensive tackle

Personal information
- Born: October 23, 1981 (age 45); Shreveport, Louisiana, U.S.
- Listed height: 6 ft 7 in (2.01 m)
- Listed weight: 352 lb (160 kg)

Career information
- College: Valdosta State
- NFL draft: 2006: undrafted

Career history
- Jacksonville Jaguars (2006–2008)

Awards and highlights
- First-team All-GSC (2005)

Career NFL statistics
- Games played: 8
- Games started: 1
- Return yards: 8
- Stats at Pro Football Reference

Richard Bernard Collier (born October 23, 1981) is an American former professional football player. He played offensive tackle for the Jacksonville Jaguars of the National Football League (NFL) from 2006 to 2008, until a shooting incident left him paralyzed from the waist down, ending his football career.

Collier played college football for the Valdosta State University Blazers. He was signed by the Jacksonville Jaguars in 2006 as an undrafted free agent, and played two seasons for the team. His career was cut short after he suffered multiple gunshot wounds in early September 2008. As a result, he was left paralyzed and with his left leg amputated.

== Early life ==
Collier was born and raised in Shreveport, Louisiana. He played football at Northwood High School, where he graduated in 2001. Poor grades prevented him from attending college, and he spent the next two years working in the produce section of a local Wal-Mart. Eventually, he decided to give football and college another try, and enrolled at Tyler Junior College in Texas. There he soon improved both his grades and his physical fitness, and made the Tyler football team's starting lineup. In 2004, he transferred to Valdosta State University in Georgia, where he played for the Valdosta State Blazers football team. The team won the 2004 NCAA Division II Football Championship, and Collier received All-America honors in 2005, his senior year.

== Professional career ==
Following the 2006 NFL draft, Collier was signed by the Jacksonville Jaguars as an undrafted free agent on April 30. He made the final roster following the preseason and went on to play in four games his rookie season, all in a reserve role. He was inactive for the first 12 games of the 2007 season. He was suspended for two games and fined by Jaguars head coach Jack Del Rio after being arrested for driving under the influence on November 3. Not wanting to bring additional negative publicity to the team and threaten a potential chance at making the starting lineup, he pleaded no contest to all charges at the subsequent hearing and made a public vow to keep himself out of trouble. He appeared in the team's final four games of the season and made his first career start in the regular season finale against the Houston Texans on December 30.

In May 2008, the Jaguars signed Collier to a contract extension. That season, he played on all four of the Jaguars' preseason games in a reserve role.

== Shooting ==
On September 2, 2008, Collier was shot and critically wounded outside an apartment building in Jacksonville's Riverside neighborhood. Collier was in the passenger seat of a car driven by his former Jacksonville teammate Kenny Pettway at the time of the attack; it was later revealed that he had suffered 14 gunshot wounds and was left paralyzed from the waist down. A blood clot later caused the amputation of his left leg above the knee. Pettway, who had been in the driver's seat, was unharmed.

Earlier in the night Collier and Pettway had been at the Jacksonville nightclub Square One in San Marco, where they met up with two women, as well as fellow Jaguars player Clint Ingram. After midnight Ingram went home and Collier and Pettway drove the women to their apartment in Riverside. They were waiting for them in the car when they were attacked from behind in what some media reports called an "ambush". Two days after the shooting, the Jaguars placed Collier on the non-football injury reserve list. Later that month, when the extent of his injuries were revealed, it was confirmed that his football career was over.

One man, Tyrone Hartsfield, was arrested and charged with attempted murder. The Jacksonville Sheriff's Office believed the shooting was in retaliation for an altercation the two men had had months earlier; Hartsfield had filed a report with the police in April after Collier had punched him in a scuffle at another nightclub. The prosecution's case involved testimony from a friend of Hartsfield's, who said he had been with Hartsfield the night of the shooting and later secretly recorded a conversation with him for the police. Largely on the strength of this testimony the jury found Hartsfield guilty in November 2009; he was subsequently sentenced to life in prison.

== Later life ==
In 2009, one year after the shooting, Collier was unanimously elected to receive the Ed Block Courage Award by his Jacksonville teammates.

In 2010 Collier featured in the documentary film The 904, which discusses Jacksonville's murder rate and the city's attempts to reduce it.

Collier married his long-time girlfriend Chandra Baker in November 2010. With the aid of a prosthetic limb and a specially designed body brace, he was able to stand for the ceremony.
