= 2001 Arkansas vs. Ole Miss football game =

2001 American college football game

Longest game in NCAA Division I-A history
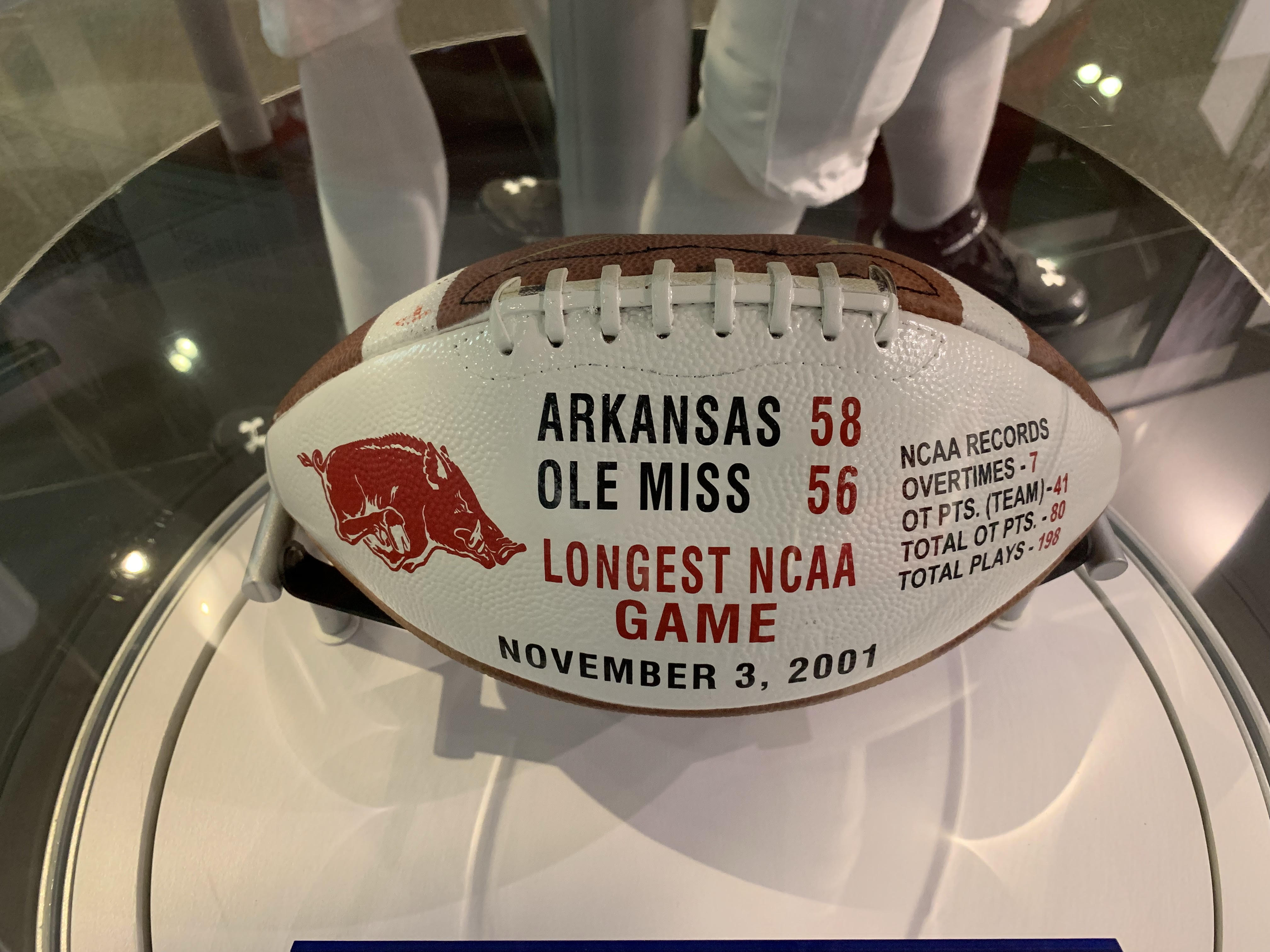
- Commemorative football on display at the College Football Hall of Fame in Atlanta
Arkansas Razorbacks	Ole Miss Rebels
(4–3)	(6–1)
58	56
Head coach: Houston Nutt	Head coach: David Cutcliffe
	1	2	3	4	OT	2OT	3OT	4OT	5OT	6OT	7OT	Total
Arkansas	0	7	3	7	7	0	6	6	6	8	8	58
Ole Miss	7	0	3	7	7	0	6	6	6	8	6	56
- Date: November 3, 2001
- Season: 2001
- Stadium: Vaught–Hemingway Stadium
- Location: Oxford, MS
- Referee: Thomas Ritter
- Attendance: 47,464

United States TV coverage
- Network: ESPN2
- Announcers: Mike Golic, Bill Curry, Dave Barnett

The 2001 Arkansas vs. Ole Miss football game was a college football game played on November 3, 2001, between the University of Arkansas Razorbacks and the University of Mississippi Rebels; it broke a then–NCAA record for the longest football game ever played. The game included seven overtime periods, one of five games to ever do so. The lead went back and forth, with Ole Miss leading in the first quarter. The game was tied at halftime, and in the third quarter Arkansas gained a lead that Ole Miss would not get back until the fourth overtime. The game ended in the seventh overtime period when Ole Miss quarterback Eli Manning failed to complete a pass on a two-point conversion play.

== Before the game ==
=== Arkansas ===
The Arkansas Razorbacks entered the game 4–3, led by 4th-year head coach Houston Nutt. They opened their season on a Thursday night, beating UNLV in Little Rock 14–10. The Razorbacks then dropped three straight SEC contests, first to No. 8 Tennessee, 3–13. Following a week off due to the September 11 attacks, the 1–1 Razorbacks then lost to Alabama and Georgia, both on the road. The Hogs won their homecoming game the next week, beating Weber State 42–19. Now 2–3, Arkansas upset No. 9 South Carolina, and, following their bye week, upset No. 17 Auburn. Those two wins put them at 4–3 going into their contest with Ole Miss.

=== Ole Miss ===
The Ole Miss Rebels entered the game 6–1 under 3rd-year head coach David Cutcliffe. They opened their season with a win at home against Murray State, but dropped their first SEC game on the road to Auburn. Following a 21-day break, the Rebels returned to the field and defeated Kentucky for their first conference win of the season. The Rebels then rose to 3–1 following a road win at Arkansas State. Ole Miss then returned home to face Alabama and Middle Tennessee, defeating them both. In their last game before playing Arkansas, Ole Miss beat LSU on the road, 35–24, to post a 6–1 record.

== Game summary ==
=== Game information ===
Game Time	Weather
Kickoff: 6:06 p.m. End of Game: 10:20 p.m. Duration: 4 hours, 14 minutes	Temperature: 65 °F (18 °C); Wind: NE 5 mph (8.0 km/h); Weather: Clear skies
Game officials
Tom Ritter (referee), W. Hackett, Jr. (umpire), Lea Rutter (linesman), Al Matthews (line judge); Dale Keneipp (back judge), Richard Morales (field judge), Jay Vines (side judge)

=== Scoring summary ===
Scoring summary

Quarter	Time	Drive			Team	Scoring information	Score	
Quarter	Time	Plays	Yards	TOP	Team	Scoring information	ARK	MISS
1	8:20	12	80	5:07	MISS	Joe Gunn 1-yard touchdown run, Jonathan Nichols kick good	0	7
2	0:25	13	81	4:00	ARK	Cedric Cobbs 2-yard touchdown run, Brennan O'Donahoe kick good	7	7
3	5:37	6	15	0:45	ARK	46-yard field goal by Brennan O'Donahoe	10	7
3	3:00	7	26	0:57	MISS	32-yard field goal by Jonathan Nichols	10	10
4	10:44	15	85	15:34	ARK	Mark Pierce 2-yard touchdown run, Brennan O'Donohoe kick good	17	10
4	4:54	13	72	3:56	MISS	Jason Armstead 4-yard touchdown reception from Eli Manning, Jonathan Nichols kick good	17	17
OT		4	25		ARK	Cedric Cobbs 16-yard touchdown run, Brennan O'Donohoe kick good	24	17
OT		7	25		MISS	Jason Armstead 11-yard touchdown reception from Eli Manning, Jonathan Nichols kick good	24	24
3OT		1	25		ARK	Matt Jones 25-yard touchdown run, 2-point run failed	30	24
3OT		5	25		MISS	Joe Gunn 1-yard touchdown run, 2-point pass incomplete	30	30
4OT		4	25		MISS	Bill Flowers 22-yard touchdown reception from Eli Manning, 2-point pass incomplete	30	36
4OT		2	25		ARK	George Wilson 24-yard touchdown reception from Matt Jones, 2-point run failed	36	36
5OT		4	25		ARK	Matt Jones 8-yard touchdown run, 2-point pass failed	42	36
5OT		4	25		MISS	Doug Ziegler 12-yard touchdown reception from Eli Manning, 2-point pass failed	42	42
6OT		2	25		MISS	Doug Ziegler 15-yard touchdown reception from Eli Manning, 2-point run good	42	50
6OT		2	25		ARK	Mark Pierce 3-yard touchdown run, 2-point pass good	50	50
7OT		7	25		ARK	Mark Pierce 1-yard touchdown run, 2-point pass good	58	50
7OT		9	25		MISS	Jason Armstead 4-yard touchdown reception from Eli Manning, 2-point pass failed	58	56
"TOP" = time of possession. For other American football terms, see Glossary of American football.							58	56

- Source

=== Game statistics ===
- Source

==== Team statistics ====
Stat	Arkansas	Ole Miss	Stat	Arkansas	Ole Miss
First Downs	32	28	Fumbles–Lost	1–1	1–1
Rushing	22	10	Penalties–Yards	4–40	4–16
Passing	10	17	Punts–Yards	5–188	5–181
Penalty	0	1	Avg per Punt	37.6	36.2
Total Offense	531	457	Time of Possession	33:34	26:26
Rushing	370	145	3rd Down Conversions	16/26	7/17
Passing	161	312	4th Down Conversions	3/3	2/2
Rushing Att–TD (Avg.)	80–7 (4.6)	50–2 (2.9)	PATs–Attempts (2pt–Attempts)	3–3 (1–5)	3–3 (2–5)
Passing Comp/Att (TD–Int)	12/26 (1–1)	27/42 (6–0)	Field Goals–Attempts (Long)	1–2 (45)	1–1 (32)

==== Game leaders ====
Team	Category	Player	Statistics
Arkansas	Passing	Zak Clark	9/20, 100 yds, 1 INT
Arkansas	Rushing	Fred Talley	23 car, 113 yds
Arkansas	Receiving	George Wilson	8 rec, 105 yds, 1 TD
Ole Miss	Passing	Eli Manning	27/42, 312 yds, 6 TD
Ole Miss	Rushing	Joe Gunn	31 car, 102 yds, 2 TD
Ole Miss	Receiving	Bill Flowers	7 rec, 97 yds, 1 TD

== See also ==
- 2003 Arkansas vs. Kentucky football game – the second game to feature seven overtimes
- 2006 North Texas vs. FIU football game – the third game to go to seven overtimes, and the first such non-SEC game
- 2017 Western Michigan vs. Buffalo football game – the fourth game to go to seven overtimes
- 2018 LSU vs. Texas A&M football game – the fifth and most recent game to reach seven overtimes
- 2021 Illinois vs. Penn State football game - the first game to feature nine overtimes
- 2024 Georgia Tech vs. Georgia football game - the first game to feature eight overtimes
