= Kenneth Pettway =

American gridiron football player (born 1982)

- Pettway in 2008

No. 56, 91, 93, 99, 36
- Position: Defensive end

Personal information
- Born: November 13, 1982 (age 43); Houston, Texas, U.S.
- Listed height: 6 ft 3 in (1.91 m)
- Listed weight: 248 lb (112 kg)

Career information
- High school: Gilmer (TX)
- College: Grambling State
- NFL draft: 2005: 7th round, 227th overall pick

Career history
- Houston Texans (2005); Jacksonville Jaguars (2006–2007); Green Bay Packers (2008); Edmonton Eskimos (2010); Calgary Stampeders (2012)

Career NFL statistics
- Total tackles: 18
- Sacks: 3
- Stats at Pro Football Reference

Kenneth Aaron Pettway (born November 13, 1982) is an American former professional football player. He played in the National Football League (NFL) and Canadian Football League (CFL) from 2005 to 2012.

Pettway played college football for the Grambling State University Tigers. He was drafted into the NFL by the Houston Texans in the seventh round of the 2005 NFL draft. He played for the Jacksonville Jaguars from 2006 to 2007 and Green Bay Packers in 2008 and then shifted to the CFL, where he played for the Edmonton Eskimos in 2010 and the Calgary Stampeders in 2012.

== Early life ==
Pettway was born in Houston, Texas. He attended Gilmer High School in Gilmer, Texas and was a letterwinner in football, basketball, and track. After attending Southern Arkansas University (whose Muleriders team was in NCAA Division II), he transferred to Grambling State University in 2002 and sat out the season pursuant to NCAA transfer rules. He played for the Grambling State Tigers football team in 2003 and 2004.

== Professional career ==
=== Houston Texans ===
Pettway was drafted by the Houston Texans in the seventh round (227th overall) of the 2005 NFL draft. He spent most of his rookie season on the team's practice squad before being promoted to the active roster on December 9. He was inactive for the team's final three regular season contests. An exclusive-rights free agent in the 2006 offseason, Pettway re-signed with the Texans on March 27. He was released by the team during final cuts on September 1.

=== Jacksonville Jaguars ===
Following his release from the Texans, Pettway was signed to the practice squad of the Jacksonville Jaguars on October 18, 2006. He was promoted to the active roster on November 8 and went on to play in the seven games for the Jaguars during the 2006 season, registering two sacks in limited action. He was released by the Jaguars during final cuts on August 30, 2008.

=== Green Bay Packers ===
Pettway was signed by the Green Bay Packers on September 30, 2008, after defensive end Cullen Jenkins was placed on injured reserve. He was signed over free agent defensive end Patrick Chukwurah, who also worked out for the Packers following Jenkins' injury. The Tennessee Titans and Pittsburgh Steelers reportedly showed interest in working out Pettway prior to his signing with Green Bay.

Pettway appeared in eight games for the Packers in 2008, recording four tackles. He was placed on season-ending injured reserve with a knee injury on December 1. He was released by the Packers on April 6, 2009.

=== Edmonton Eskimos ===
Pettway was signed by the Edmonton Eskimos of the Canadian Football League in 2010. He made his first start against the Montreal Alouettes, replacing an injured Greg Peach. He was released by the Eskimos on May 16, 2011.

=== Calgary Stampeders ===
Pettway was signed by the Calgary Stampeders on June 18, 2012. He was released by the Stampeders on January 30, 2013.

== Personal life ==
On September 2, 2008, Pettway was in a car with his former Jaguars teammate Richard Collier when Collier was shot 14 times, leaving him with life-threatening and career-ending injuries. Pettway was unharmed.
