= Alexis Bwenge =

Canadian gridiron football player (born 1981)

No. 37
- Position: Fullback

Personal information
- Born: October 19, 1981 (age 45); Saint-Apollinaire, Quebec, Canada
- Listed height: 6 ft 1 in (1.85 m)
- Listed weight: 215 lb (98 kg)

Career information
- College: Kentucky
- CFL draft: 2005: 1st round, 8th overall pick

Career history
- 2006–2009: BC Lions

Awards and highlights
- Grey Cup champion (2006)
- Stats at CFL.ca (archive)

Alexis Bwenge (born October 19, 1981) is a Canadian former fullback who played for the Canadian Football League's BC Lions. Bwenge was drafted by the Lions (1st round, 8th overall) in the 2005 CFL draft. Bwenge first signed with the Lions in May 2006 and he had one four-yard touchdown reception in the 2006 CFL season. From 2006 to 2008, he has played as kick coverage on special teams and as a back-up at running back. He played college football for the Kentucky Wildcats.

Bwenge earned an undergraduate degree in political science and a master's degree in public administration at Kentucky. He negotiated his own rookie contract with the Lions.
