= Matt Jones (wide receiver) =

American football player and sports radio personality (born 1983)

No. 18
- Position: Wide receiver

Personal information
- Born: April 22, 1983 (age 43); Fort Smith, Arkansas, U.S.
- Listed height: 6 ft 6 in (1.98 m)
- Listed weight: 222 lb (101 kg)

Career information
- High school: Northside (Fort Smith)
- College: Arkansas (2001–2004)
- NFL draft: 2005: 1st round, 21st overall pick

Career history
- Jacksonville Jaguars (2005–2008); Cincinnati Bengals (2010)*
- * Offseason or practice squad member only

Awards and highlights
- Second-team All-SEC (2004)

Career NFL statistics
- Receptions: 166
- Receiving yards: 2,153
- Receiving touchdowns: 15
- Stats at Pro Football Reference

Matthew Jones (born April 22, 1983) is an American former professional football player who was a wide receiver in the National Football League (NFL). He played college football for the Arkansas Razorbacks. Jones was selected by the Jacksonville Jaguars of the NFL in the first round of the 2005 NFL draft, and also played for the Cincinnati Bengals. After his football career, he was a sports radio personality.

== Early life ==
Matt Jones was born to Steve and Paula Jones on April 22, 1983, in Dermott, Arkansas. He spent most of his childhood in Van Buren, Arkansas, where his parents taught school and his father coached football and track. He attended Van Buren Public Schools from grade school through the end of his junior year. He burst onto the high school football scene as a 6 ft 4 in (1.93 m) sophomore wide receiver (WR), quickly making an impact for the Pointers football team, leading the team in TD receptions. He helped lead the Pointers to a 5A conference title and was named Super Sophomore by the Arkansas Democrat Gazette. Jones went on to break Corliss Williamson's Arkansas high school basketball scoring record. Jones left Van Buren following his junior year for the opportunity to play quarterback at Northside High School in Fort Smith, Arkansas, as well as be a sprinter on the school track team.

== College career ==
In college, Jones was a star quarterback for the University of Arkansas, and was also a member of the basketball team for one season. During his football career at Arkansas, Jones was a part-time starter his freshman season in 2001, and was the full-time starter from 2002 to 2004.

In his freshman year, Jones helped Arkansas defeat an Eli Manning-led Ole Miss team in Oxford in an NCAA record-setting seven overtimes. The Razorbacks lost to the University of Oklahoma in the Cotton Bowl, and finished with a record of 7–5.

In his sophomore season, Jones led Arkansas to a share of the SEC West Division championship, with a last-second touchdown pass to receiver Decori Birmingham, in a game against LSU in Little Rock. The game came to be known in the Arkansas–LSU football rivalry as the Miracle on Markham, making reference to War Memorial Stadium's being on Markham Street. Arkansas lost to the University of Minnesota in the 2002 Music City Bowl, and finished 9–5.

His junior year in 2003 was his most eventful, and saw Jones lead the Razorbacks to their second consecutive 9-win season. This included another seven-overtime victory, this time at Kentucky. Jones also led Arkansas to a 2003 Independence Bowl victory over the Missouri Tigers, 27–14, and the Razorbacks finished the season with a 9–4 record. Jones was named Second-team All-Southeastern Conference at the end of the season.

Jones' senior year saw Arkansas fail to reach a bowl game, finishing 5–6.

By the time his playing days at Arkansas were over, Jones was the SEC's all-time leader in career rushing yards by a quarterback. His rushing totals have since been eclipsed by Tim Tebow and Nick Fitzgerald.

== Professional career ==
Pre-draft measurables
Height	Weight	Arm length	Hand span	40-yard dash	10-yard split	20-yard split	20-yard shuttle	Three-cone drill	Vertical jump	Broad jump	Bench press	Wonderlic
6 ft 6 1/4 in (1.99 m)	242 lb (110 kg)	33 1/8 in (0.84 m)	9 1/2 in (0.24 m)	4.37 s	1.55 s	2.54 s	4.09 s	6.62 s	39.5 in (1.00 m)	10 ft 9 in (3.28 m)	20 reps	19
All values from NFL Combine/Pro Day

=== Jacksonville Jaguars ===
Jones, a college quarterback, was selected by the Jacksonville Jaguars as a wide receiver in the first round (21st overall) of the 2005 NFL draft. This move surprised some draft experts who thought it was a risky selection as Jones had not been a full-time wide receiver at any prior point in his career.

As a rookie, Jones finished 2005 with 36 receptions for 432 yards and five touchdowns. He then finished 2006 with 41 receptions for 643 yards and four touchdowns. In 2007, he saw his production drop. At the beginning of the season, he pledged to not shave his beard until he scored a touchdown. His streak of end zone shutouts ended in Week 8 against the Tampa Bay Buccaneers. He finished the 2007 regular season with 24 receptions for 317 yards and was tied for second on the team with four touchdown catches. In 2008, he had 65 catches for 761 yards in 12 games before being suspended for three games by the NFL on October 20, 2008, for violation of the league's substance abuse policy. He has not played in a regular-season NFL game since.

On March 16, 2009, Jones was released from the Jacksonville Jaguars following substance abuse-related arrests.

=== Cincinnati Bengals ===
Jones worked out with several teams during the 2009 season, but none resulted in contracts. After spending the 2009 NFL season out of football, Jones received contract offers from the Cincinnati Bengals and the Tennessee Titans. On February 12, 2010, Jones signed a one-year, $700,000 contract with the Bengals. Jones was waived on the last day of final cuts by the Bengals and did not make the 53-man roster.

On November 2, 2010, it was reported that Jones declined a tryout with the Washington Redskins, telling them that he intended to retire.

== NFL career statistics ==
Year	Team	GP	Receiving							Rushing						Fumbles	
Year	Team	GP	Rec	Tgts	Yds	Avg	Lng	TD	FD	Att	Yds	Avg	Lng	TD	FD	Fum	lost
2005	JAX	16	36	—	432	12.0	42	5	23	12	51	4.3	25	0	2	2	0
2006	JAX	14	41	76	643	15.7	49	4	33	2	−15	−7.5	−6	0	0	1	1
2007	JAX	12	24	49	317	13.2	48	4	15	0	0	0.0	0	0	0	0	0
2008	JAX	12	65	108	761	11.7	35	2	47	0	0	0.0	0	0	0	1	1
Career		54	166	233	2,153	13.0	49	15	118	14	36	2.6	25	0	2	4	2

== Radio career ==
Jones worked as a sports radio personality in Arkansas from 2012 to 2016.

== Arrests ==
On July 10, 2008, in Fayetteville, Arkansas, Jones was arrested at gunpoint and charged with felony possession of a controlled substance.

Jones and one other former Arkansas football player, Jared Hicks, were inside a vehicle that was searched by police. The police found a plastic bag filled with six grams of a white substance that tested positive as cocaine and a jar with possible marijuana residue. Officers questioned Jones and he acknowledged the white powder was in fact cocaine, the report said.

Jones' father, Steve Jones, disputed the allegations that his son was involved in any wrongdoing and released a statement which was posted on the web site of Fayetteville television station KNWA-TV: "We want to make it clear that Matt was not in possession of any drugs, but that there were drugs in the vehicle and were located in the closest proximity to Matt."

On October 8, 2008, an agreement was reached between Jones and the Washington County Prosecutor's Office. Prosecutor John Threet agreed to send the case to drug court on October 13, 2008. Prosecutors said the felony charge would be dismissed if Jones completed the drug program. A hearing in drug court, rather than in the regular criminal system, allowed Jones to keep any conviction off his record.

The NFL suspended Jones for three weeks for violating the league's substance abuse policy. He was in the lineup for Week 8, pending an appeal. On December 9, 2008, the NFL upheld Jones' three-game suspension, which caused him to miss the rest of the season.

On March 9, 2009, in Washington County, Jones was arrested again after failing a drug test which showed that he had alcohol in his system, which violated the condition of his probation. He was held in jail after he asked to be imprisoned rather than sent to a six-week residential treatment program that would have interfered with the beginning of training camp. He was released on March 14, 2009, after his latest arrest, but returned to court on April 13.
