= Hallsville High School (Texas) =

Coordinates: 32.5158°N 94.5918°W

Location
- 616 Cal Young Lane; Hallsville, Texas 75650-0810; United States

Information
- School type: Public high school
- School district: Hallsville Independent School District
- Principal: James Gibson
- Teaching staff: 114.30 (FTE)
- Grades: 9–12
- Enrollment: 1,462 (2023–2024)
- Student to teacher ratio: 12.79
- Colors: Purple and white
- Athletics conference: UIL Class AAAAA
- Mascot: Bobcats and Ladycats
- Website: hhs.hisd.com

Hallsville High School is a 5A high school located in northwest Harrison County between the cities of Longview and Marshall in rural northeast Texas. In 2011, the school was rated "Recognized" by the Texas Education Agency. It is in the Hallsville Independent School District.

The boundary of the school district includes the part of eastern Longview in Harrison County.

== History ==
The school opened in a small building with one teacher, Salina Ferrell Smith, before moving into specially constructed quarters on the ground floor of the Masonic Lodge, completed in December 1871. The building was destroyed by fire in 1878 and replaced in 1879. After two expansions of that building, the school moved in 1914 to its own building with six classrooms and an auditorium, which was replaced in 1937 by a white-brick building on approximately the same site. This was replaced in 1958 and again in 1977 by new buildings on different sites. The school's fourth campus opened in fall 2012; the previous campus became the junior high school.

== Speech and debating ==
In 2010 Hallsville High School won both the UIL 4A LD championship and the CX debate championship. They also won the CX debate championship in 2009. The speech and debate squad has consistently sent a competitor to UIL state in at least one of the speech and debate events. The UIL Academic team was the state runner-up champion in 2010. In 2014, Hallsville High School was the state champion in 4A UIL Academic.

== Athletics ==
The Hallsville Bobcats compete in cross country, volleyball, football, basketball, powerlifting, soccer, golf, tennis, track, softball and baseball. The school has a baseball venue, The Ballpark at Hallsville. The Bobcats compete in the University Interscholastic League in baseball.

== UIL Academics ==
The Hallsville High School UIL Academic team currently consists of 21 academic teams: Accounting, Computer Applications, Current Issues and Events, Literary Criticism, Ready Writing, Social Studies, Spelling and Vocabulary, Calculator Applications, Computer Science, Mathematics, Number Sense, Robotics, Science, One-Act Play, Theatrical Design, Film, Extemporaneous Speaking, Oral Interpretation, Debate, and Congress. The Academic Team is the largest extra-curricular event at Hallsville High School.

In 2018, the Hallsville UIL team hosted the UIL District Meet. In 2019 Hallsville sent 23 students to state with Nathan Davis winning state champion in Biology and social studies in region 5. The first state champion for social studies coach Sheila Wright who has been teaching at HHS since 1993.
