= Hallsville, Texas =

- City
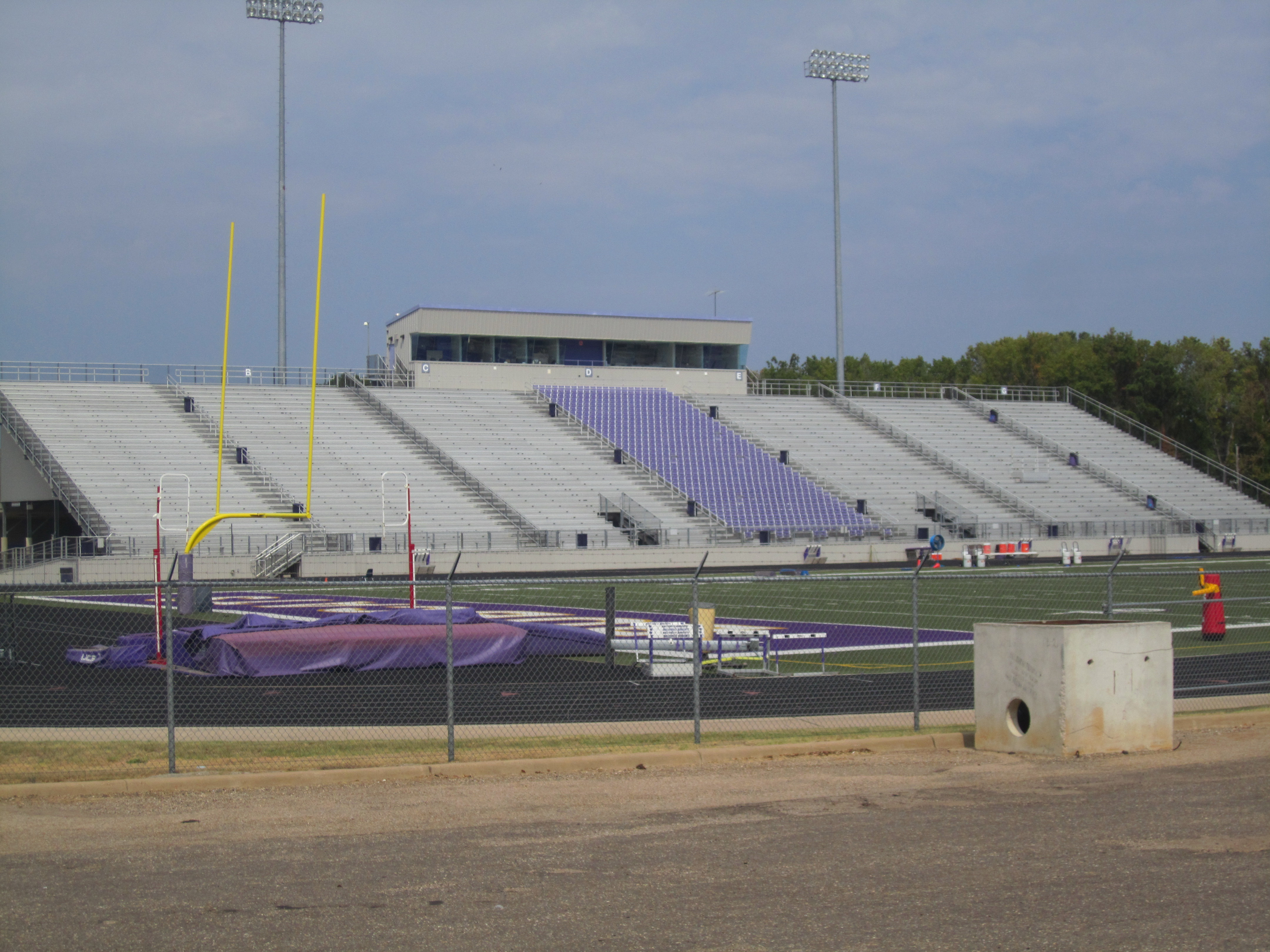
- Bobcat Stadium at Hallsville Junior High

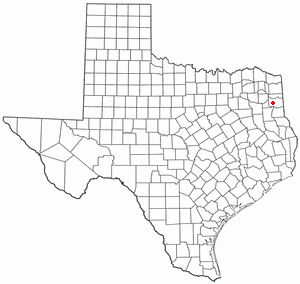
- Location of Hallsville, Texas

- Coordinates: 32°29′55″N 94°34′10″W
- Country: United States
- State: Texas
- County: Harrison

Government
  - City Council: Mayor

Area
  - Total: 3.81 sq mi (9.86 km^{2})
  - Land: 3.81 sq mi (9.86 km^{2})
  - Water: 0 sq mi (0.00 km^{2})
- Elevation: 364 ft (111 m)

Population (2020)
  - Total: 4,277
  - Density: 1,128.8/sq mi (435.82/km^{2})
- Time zone: UTC-6 (Central (CST))
  - Summer (DST): UTC-5 (CDT)
- ZIP code: 75650
- Area codes: 903, 430
- FIPS code: 48-31904
- GNIS feature ID: 2410689
- Website: cityofhallsvilletx.com

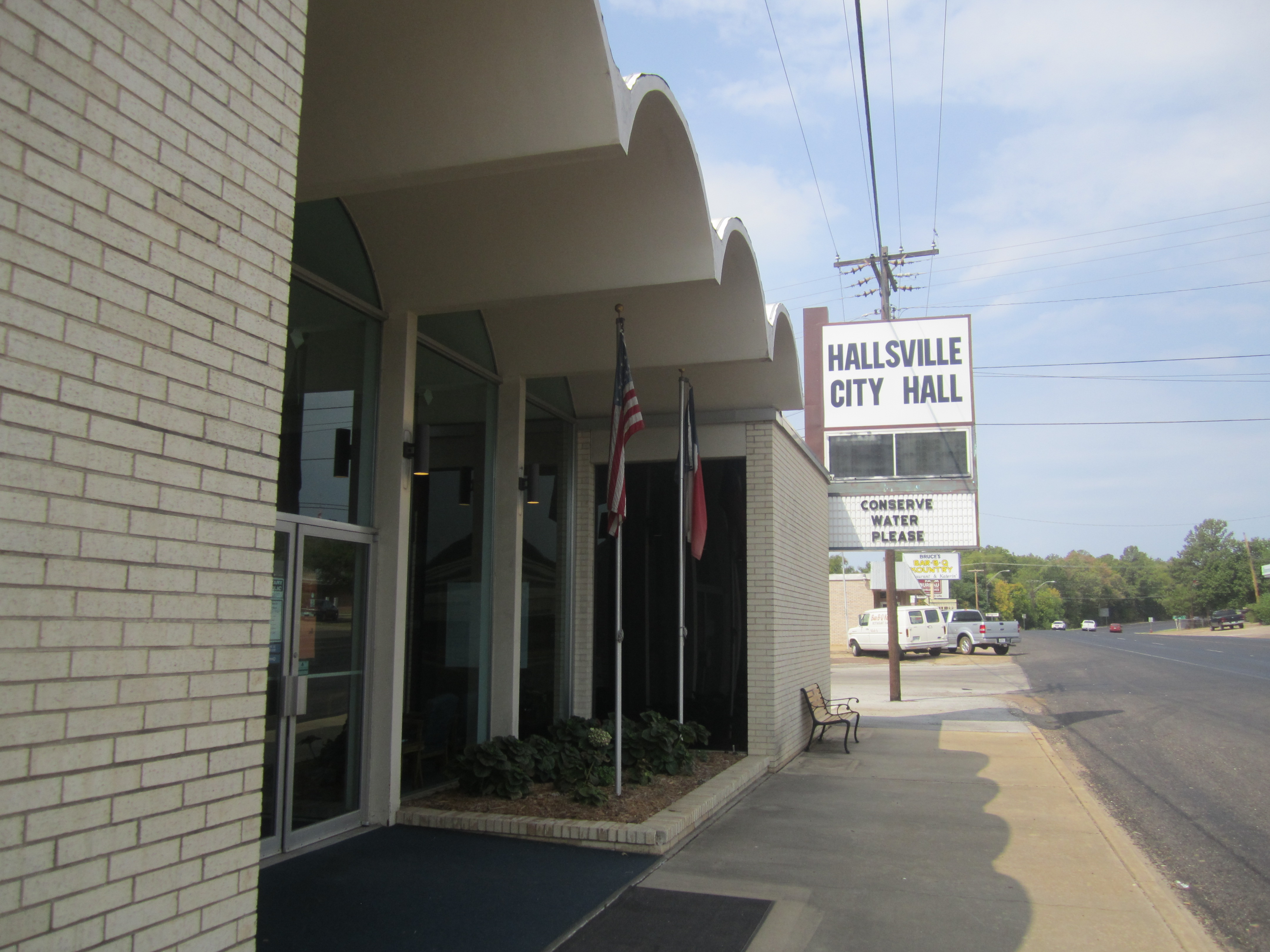
Hallsville City Hall is located on the main thoroughfare of the community, U.S. Highway 80.

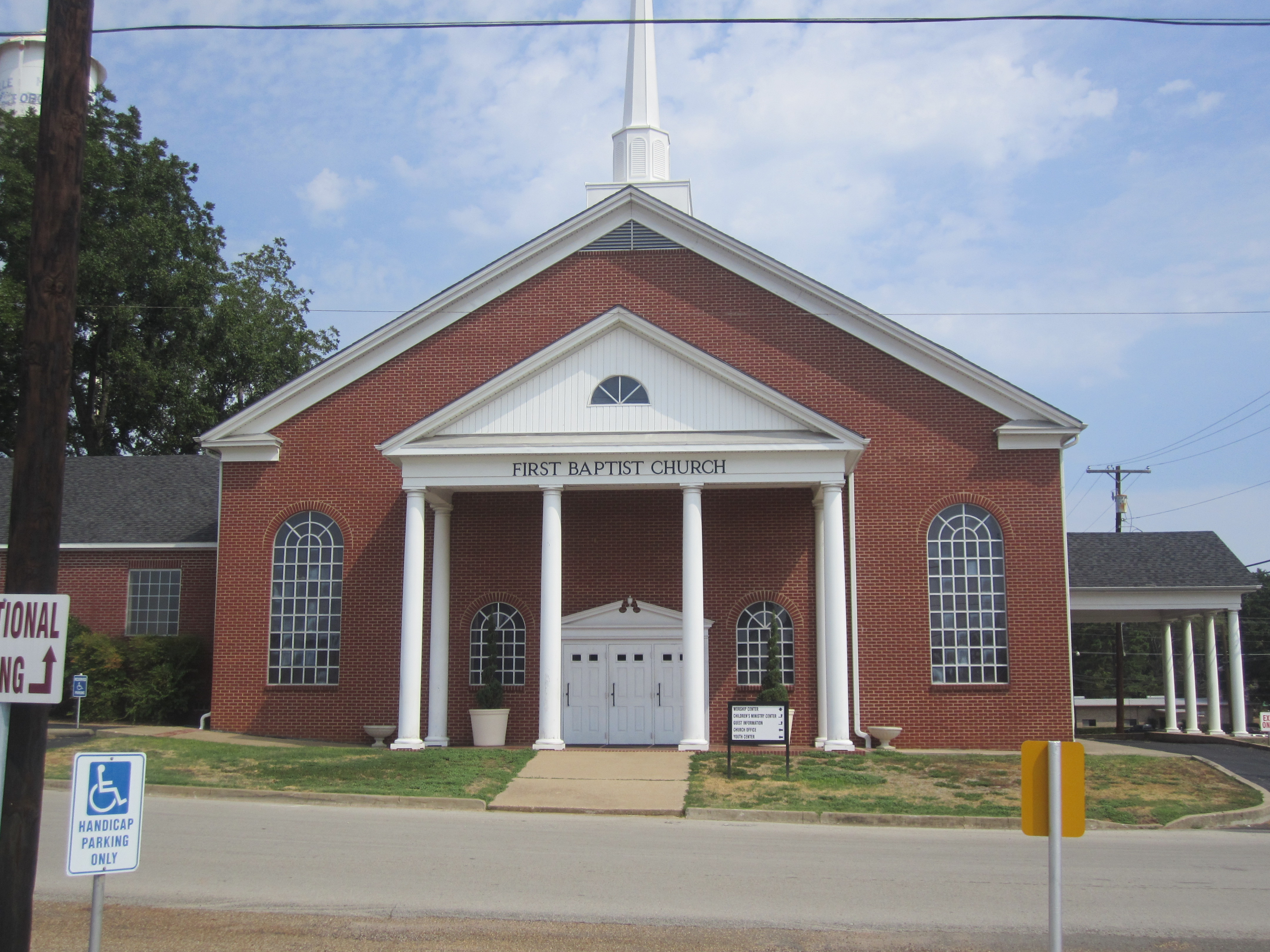
First Baptist Church in Hallsville

Hallsville is a city in Harrison County, Texas, United States, located 13 miles (21 km) west of the county seat, Marshall, on U.S. Highway 80. The population was 3,577 at the 2010 census, up from 2,772 at the 2000 census. The 2020 census revealed that Hallsville's population was 4,277.

== History ==
=== Past ===
The area was first settled in 1839, when Fort Crawford was built one mile west of the site of present Hallsville by W. C. Crawford as a protection against Native Americans. In 1849, the fort is reported to have had a post office and a two-story building that served as church, Masonic hall, and school (the only school in western Harrison County until 1868). In 1869, when an independent Southern Pacific Railway crossed a mile north of Fort Crawford, the settlers moved to the railroad and named the new settlement for a railroad official. All that remains at the original location is a cemetery.

A post office named "Hallville" opened in 1869, and the first business in the new community was a saloon. From 1869 to 1872 the town was the terminus of the railroad, and the railroad company built a general office and machine shops there. The community incorporated for the first time in 1870 and was a boom town, with as many as fifty businesses, in the early 1870s. Hallville shipped cotton, wool, and hides. In 1872, when the Texas and Pacific acquired the railroad and built out to Longview in Gregg County, Hallville lost much of its western trade. In 1873, the railroad moved its local headquarters and shops to Marshall. Hallville's incorporation lapsed, and the community lost many of its people to Marshall in the later 1870s. In 1884, it had an estimated 600 inhabitants, three churches, six sawmills, six grist mill-gins, a hotel, two saloons, and a cooperative association. By 1892 the population had fallen to 300, but it recovered to 600 in the 1900s. In 1904, the Hallville school district had two schools serving 180 white pupils and one school serving 111 black pupils Galilee High School. A bank opened in the community in 1909. In the 1920s, the post office changed the spelling of its name to Hallsville. The community reincorporated in 1935.

=== Present ===
Until 2003, Hallsville had only one traffic light, located at the main intersection at Main Street (HWY 80) and FM 450. The town has experienced rapid growth in the past decade and now boasts six traffic lights, a larger corporate grocery store chain, a medical and dental clinic, two dollar stores and several fast-food chains. The heart and pulse of the community still lies in its school functions, particularly sporting events. In May 2025, City Hall was moved from Highway 80 to Willow Street.

== Geography ==
Hallsville is located in western Harrison County. U.S. Highway 80 passes through the center of town as Main Street, leading east 13 miles (21 km) to Marshall, the county seat, and west 10 miles (16 km) to Longview. Farm to Market Road 450 leads south from the center of Hallsville 2 miles (3 km) to Interstate 20 at exit 604 and north 13 miles (21 km) to Harleton.

According to the United States Census Bureau, Hallsville has a total area of 3.7 square miles (9.6 km^{2}), all land.

== Demographics ==
Historical population
Census	Pop.	Note	%±
1880	179		—
1950	617		—
1960	684		10.9%
1970	1,038		51.8%
1980	1,556		49.9%
1990	2,288		47.0%
2000	2,772		21.2%
2010	3,577		29.0%
2020	4,277		19.6%
U.S. Decennial Census

=== 2020 census ===
As of the 2020 census, Hallsville had a population of 4,277. The median age was 33.3 years. 30.4% of residents were under the age of 18 and 11.8% of residents were 65 years of age or older. For every 100 females there were 91.9 males, and for every 100 females age 18 and over there were 88.4 males age 18 and over.

98.7% of residents lived in urban areas, while 1.3% lived in rural areas.

There were 1,531 households in Hallsville, of which 45.9% had children under the age of 18 living in them. Of all households, 54.5% were married-couple households, 14.2% were households with a male householder and no spouse or partner present, and 26.2% were households with a female householder and no spouse or partner present. About 20.0% of all households were made up of individuals and 7.3% had someone living alone who was 65 years of age or older.

There were 1,648 housing units, of which 7.1% were vacant. The homeowner vacancy rate was 1.6% and the rental vacancy rate was 8.9%.

Racial composition as of the 2020 census
Race	Number	Percent
White	3,348	78.3%
Black or African American	410	9.6%
American Indian and Alaska Native	32	0.7%
Asian	50	1.2%
Native Hawaiian and Other Pacific Islander	2	0.0%
Some other race	88	2.1%
Two or more races	347	8.1%
Hispanic or Latino (of any race)	350	8.2%

=== 2010 census ===
As of the 2010 census Hallsville had a population of 3,577. The median age was 32. The racial and ethnic composition of the population was 89.1% white, 5.5% black or African American, 0.6% Native American, 0.3% Asian, 2.6% from some other race and 2.0% from two or more races. 6.1% of the population was Hispanic of any race.

=== 2000 census ===
As of the census of 2000, there were 2,772 people, 993 households, and 799 families residing in the city. The population density was 1,217.3 inhabitants per square mile (470.0/km^{2}). There were 1,050 housing units at an average density of 461.1 per square mile (178.0/km^{2}). The racial makeup of the city was 93.15% White, 4.76% African American, 0.14% Native American, 0.36% Asian, 0.69% from other races, and 0.90% from two or more races. Hispanic or Latino of any race were 2.27% of the population.

There were 993 households, out of which 48.6% had children under the age of 18 living with them, 62.8% were married couples living together, 14.8% had a female householder with no husband present, and 19.5% were non-families. 17.8% of all households were made up of individuals, and 7.5% had someone living alone who was 65 years of age or older. The average household size was 2.79 and the average family size was 3.16.

In the city, the population was spread out, with 33.2% under the age of 18, 7.5% from 18 to 24, 31.3% from 25 to 44, 20.5% from 45 to 64, and 7.5% who were 65 years of age or older. The median age was 33 years. For every 100 females, there were 86.9 males. For every 100 females age 18 and over, there were 83.2 males.

The median income for a household in the city was $45,341, and the median income for a family was $49,868. Males had a median income of $39,844 versus $21,833 for females. The per capita income for the city was $19,689. About 5.8% of families and 7.4% of the population were below the poverty line, including 8.6% of those under age 18 and 10.4% of those age 65 or over.

== Media ==
=== Bobcat Radio ===
Bobcat Radio 104.9 KQAT is an information source for western Harrison County, owned and operated by Hallsville Independent School District. The low power FM (LPFM) station serves the city of Hallsville and the surrounding community for a 10-mile radius. Bobcat Radio also broadcasts on the Internet.

== Education ==
The city is served by the Hallsville Independent School District.

== Notable people ==
- James M. Collins, U.S. Representative from Dallas County, 1968–1983
- Clint Ingram, NFL Jacksonville Jaguars outside linebacker 2006–2011 – Drafted 2006, University of Oklahoma
- Harry Kinzy, MLB Chicago White Sox pitcher 1934
- Roddrick Muckelroy, former NFL Washington Redskins linebacker – drafted 2010, University of Texas at Austin
- Robert Newhouse, former NFL Dallas Cowboys fullback 1973-1983 - Drafted 1972, University of Houston
- Robert Manley Parker, retired federal judge of the U.S. 5th Circuit Court of Appeals
- Ali Sattar Al-mayahi, Former FC Dallas 2016-2025. Becoming the teams highest scorer of all time.

== Climate ==
The climate in this area is characterized by hot, humid summers and generally mild to cool winters. According to the Köppen Climate Classification system, Hallsville has a humid subtropical climate, abbreviated "Cfa" on climate maps.
