= 2004 Oakland Raiders season =

NFL team season

- Owner: Al Davis
- General manager: Al Davis
- Head coach: Norv Turner
- Home stadium: Network Associates Coliseum

Results
- Record: 5–11
- Division place: 4th AFC West
- Playoffs: Did not qualify
- Pro Bowlers: Shane Lechler, P

The 2004 Oakland Raiders season was the 45th of professional football for the Oakland Raiders franchise, their 35th season as members of the National Football League (NFL), and their ninth season since returning to Oakland. They were led by head coach Norv Turner in his first season as head coach of the Raiders. They played their home games at Network Associates Coliseum as member of the AFC West. They finished the season 5–11, finishing in last place in the AFC West for the second consecutive year. This was the first time the Raiders suffered from consecutive losing seasons since 1996 and 1997.

Though Rich Gannon began the season as the Raiders starting quarterback, he suffered a neck injury in the third game of the season that would eventually lead to his retirement. For the second consecutive season, the Raiders suffered a five-game losing streak in the middle of the season. They only won one game by a touchdown or more, defeating their Super Bowl XXXVII opponent, the Tampa Bay Buccaneers, 30-20.

The team lost two of their starting receivers from the 2002 team: Tim Brown was released and signed with the Tampa Bay Buccaneers and Jerry Rice was traded to the Seattle Seahawks midseason.

== Previous season ==
The Raiders finished the 2003 season 4–12 to finish in a tie for last place in the AFC West. Following the season, Raider owner Al Davis fired head coach Bill Callahan after two years as head coach. A month later, the team named Norv Turner head coach.

== Offseason ==
=== Free Agency ===
Player	Former team
Warren Sapp	Tampa Bay Buccaneers
Ted Washington	New England Patriots
Bobby Hamilton	New England Patriots
Danny Clark	Jacksonville Jaguars

Player	New team
Eric Barton	New York Jets
Rod Coleman	Atlanta Falcons

=== NFL draft ===
2004 Oakland Raiders draft
Round	Pick	Player	Position	College	Notes
1	2	Robert Gallery	OT	Iowa	
2	45	Jake Grove	C	Virginia Tech	
3	67	Stuart Schweigert	FS	Purdue	
4	99	Carlos Francis	WR	Texas Tech	
5	134	Johnnie Morant	WR	Syracuse	
6	166	Shawn Johnson	DE	Delaware	
6	182	Cody Spencer	LB	North Texas	
7	245	Courtney Anderson	TE	San Jose State	
7	255	Andre Sommersell	LB	Colorado State	
Made roster † Pro Football Hall of Fame * Made at least one Pro Bowl during career

== Staff ==
2004 Oakland Raiders staff
Head coaches: Head coach – Norv Turner; Assistant head coach/offensive coordinator – Jimmy Raye; Offensive coaches: Quarterbacks – Steve Sarkisian; Running backs – Skip Peete; Wide receivers – Fred Biletnikoff; Tight ends – John Morton; Offensive line – Aaron Kromer; Offensive assistant – Chris Turner	Defensive coaches: Defensive coordinator – Rob Ryan; Defensive line – Sam Clancy; Inside linebackers – Don Martindale; Outside linebackers – Pat Jones; Defensive backs – Clayton Lopez; Quality control/defense – Chris Griswold; Squad development – Willie Brown; Special teams coaches: Special teams coordinator – Joe Avezzano; Specials teams assistant – Martin Bayless; Strength and conditioning: Strength and conditioning – Jeff Fish

== Roster ==
2004 Oakland Raiders roster
Quarterbacks: 5 Kerry Collins; 8 Marques Tuiasosopo; Running backs: 32 Zack Crockett FB; 20 Justin Fargas; 44 Chris Hetherington FB; 27 J. R. Redmond; 28 Amos Zereoué; Wide receivers: 85 Doug Gabriel; 19 Johnnie Morant; 84 Jerry Porter; 15 John Stone; 87 Alvis Whitted; Tight ends: 83 Courtney Anderson; 82 Teyo Johnson; 88 Doug Jolley; 86 Roland Williams	Offensive linemen: 70 Brad Badger G; 76 Robert Gallery OT; 64 Jake Grove C; 71 Corey Hulsey G; 65 Barry Sims OT; 78 Chad Slaughter OT; 62 Adam Treu C; 66 Langston Walker OT; Defensive linemen: 91 Tyler Brayton DE; 94 Akbar Gbaja-Biamila DE; 98 Bobby Hamilton DE; 96 Grant Irons DE; 93 Tommy Kelly DE; 97 John Parrella DT; 90 Terdell Sands DT; 99 Warren Sapp DT; 92 Ted Washington DT	Linebackers: 55 Danny Clark MLB; 59 DeLawrence Grant OLB; 58 Napoleon Harris OLB; 51 Tim Johnson MLB; 56 Travian Smith OLB; 54 Sam Williams OLB; Defensive backs: 23 Marques Anderson SS; 21 Nnamdi Asomugha CB; 34 Ray Buchanan FS; 31 Phillip Buchanon CB; 40 Jarrod Cooper FS; 42 Keyon Nash FS; 30 Stuart Schweigert SS; 35 David Terrell FS; 25 Denard Walker CB; 29 Brock Williams CB; 24 Charles Woodson CB; Special teams: 11 Sebastian Janikowski K; 9 Shane Lechler P	Reserve lists: 89 Ronald Curry WR (IR); 10 Carlos Francis WR (IR); 12 Rich Gannon QB (IR); 36 Derrick Gibson S (IR); 38 Clarence Love CB (IR); 73 Frank Middleton G (IR); 67 Ron Stone G (IR); 47 Tyrone Wheatley RB (IR); 77 Joe Wong G/T (PUP); Practice squad: 48 James Adkisson TE; 13 Bret Engemann QB; 49 J. P. Foschi TE; 2 DeJuan Green RB; 61 Jason Jimenez OT; 75 Brad Lekkerkerker OT; 33 J. R. Niklos FB; 18 LaShaun Ward WR; rookies in italics 53 active, 9 inactive, 8 practice squad

|}

== Regular season ==
=== Schedule ===
Week	Date	Opponent	Result	Record	Venue	Attendance
1	September 12	at Pittsburgh Steelers	**L** 21–24	0–1	Heinz Field	60,147
2	September 19	Buffalo Bills	**W** 13–10	1–1	Network Associates Coliseum	53,610
3	September 26	Tampa Bay Buccaneers	**W** 30–20	2–1	Network Associates Coliseum	60,874
4	October 3	at Houston Texans	**L** 17–30	2–2	Reliant Stadium	70,741
5	October 10	at Indianapolis Colts	**L** 14–35	2–3	RCA Dome	57,230
6	October 17	**Denver Broncos**	**L** 3–31	2–4	Network Associates Coliseum	62,507
7	October 24	New Orleans Saints	**L** 26–31	2–5	Network Associates Coliseum	45,337
8	October 31	at **San Diego Chargers**	**L** 14–42	2–6	Qualcomm Stadium	66,210
9	November 7	at Carolina Panthers	**W** 27–24	3–6	Bank of America Stadium	73,518
10	Bye					
11	November 21	**San Diego Chargers**	**L** 17–23	3–7	Network Associates Coliseum	46,905
12	November 28	at **Denver Broncos**	**W** 25–24	4–7	Invesco Field at Mile High	75,936
13	December 5	**Kansas City Chiefs**	**L** 27–34	4–8	Network Associates Coliseum	51,292
14	December 12	at Atlanta Falcons	**L** 10–35	4–9	Georgia Dome	70,616
15	December 19	Tennessee Titans	**W** 40–35	5–9	Network Associates Coliseum	44,299
16	December 25	at **Kansas City Chiefs**	**L** 30–31	5–10	Arrowhead Stadium	77,289
17	January 2	Jacksonville Jaguars	**L** 6–13	5–11	Network Associates Coliseum	41,112
Note: Intra-division opponents are in **bold** text.

=== Select game summaries ===
==== Week 12 ====
Team	1	2	3	4	Total
• Raiders	0	7	6	12	25
Broncos	0	10	0	14	24

- Date: November 28
- Location: Invesco Field at Mile High, Denver, CO
- Game start: 8:30 p.m. EST
- Game attendance: 75,936
- Game weather: Snow
- TV announcers (ESPN): Mike Patrick, Paul Maguire, Joe Theismann, and Suzy Kolber

Scoring summary
Q2	1:55	DEN	Elam 32 yard field goal	DEN 3–0
Q2	:46	DEN	Smith 85 yard pass from Plummer (Elam kick)	DEN 10–0
Q2	:16	OAK	Porter 42 yard pass from Collins (Janikowski kick)	DEN 10–7
Q3	12:50	OAK	Porter 14 yard pass from Collins (kick blocked)	OAK 13–10
Q4	14:26	DEN	Droughns 3 yard run (Elam kick)	DEN 17–13
Q4	13:26	DEN	Johnson 32 yard interception return (Elam kick)	DEN 24–13
Q4	6:11	OAK	Curry 6 yard pass from Collins (pass failed)	DEN 24–19
Q4	1:49	OAK	Porter 5 yard pass from Collins (pass failed)	OAK 25–24

- Kerry Collins 26/45, 339 Yds
- Jerry Porter 6 Rec, 135 Yds

== Standings ==
AFC West
	W	L	T	PCT	DIV	CONF	PF	PA	STK
^{(4)} San Diego Chargers	12	4	0	.750	5–1	9–3	446	313	W1
^{(6)} Denver Broncos	10	6	0	.625	3–3	7–5	381	304	W2
Kansas City Chiefs	7	9	0	.438	3–3	6–6	483	435	L1
Oakland Raiders	5	11	0	.313	1–5	3–9	320	442	L2

AFC
#	Team	Division	W	L	T	PCT	DIV	CONF	SOS	SOV	STK
Division leaders
1	Pittsburgh Steelers	North	15	1	0	.938	5–1	11–1	.484	.479	W14
2	New England Patriots	East	14	2	0	.875	5–1	10–2	.492	.478	W2
3 (Note: Indianapolis clinched the AFC #3 seed instead of San Diego based upon head-to-head victory.)	Indianapolis Colts	South	12	4	0	.750	5–1	8–4	.500	.458	L1
4	San Diego Chargers	West	12	4	0	.750	5–1	9–3	.477	.411	W1
Wild cards
5 (Note: New York Jets clinched the AFC #5 seed instead of Denver based upon better record against common opponents (New York Jets were 5–0 to Denver’s 3–2 against San Diego, Cincinnati, Houston, and Miami).)	New York Jets	East	10	6	0	.625	3–3	7–5	.523	.406	L2
6	Denver Broncos	West	10	6	0	.625	3–3	7–5	.484	.450	W2
Did not qualify for the postseason
7 (Note: Jacksonville and Baltimore finished ahead of Buffalo because they each defeated Buffalo head-to-head.) (Note: Jacksonville finished ahead of Baltimore based upon better record against common opponents (Jacksonville were 3–2 against Baltimore’s 2–3 versus Pittsburgh, Indianapolis, Buffalo and Kansas City).)	Jacksonville Jaguars	South	9	7	0	.563	2–4	6–6	.527	.479	W1
8	Baltimore Ravens	North	9	7	0	.563	3–3	6–6	.551	.472	W1
9	Buffalo Bills	East	9	7	0	.563	3–3	5–7	.512	.382	L1
10	Cincinnati Bengals	North	8	8	0	.500	2–4	4–8	.543	.453	W2
11 (Note: Houston finished ahead of Kansas City based upon head-to-head victory.)	Houston Texans	South	7	9	0	.438	4–2	6–6	.504	.402	L1
12	Kansas City Chiefs	West	7	9	0	.438	3–3	6–6	.551	.509	L1
13 (Note: Oakland finished ahead of Tennessee based upon head-to-head victory.)	Oakland Raiders	West	5	11	0	.313	1–5	3–9	.570	.450	L2
14	Tennessee Titans	South	5	11	0	.313	1–5	3–9	.512	.463	W1
15 (Note: Miami finished ahead of Cleveland based upon head-to-head victory.)	Miami Dolphins	East	4	12	0	.250	1–5	2–10	.555	.438	L1
16	Cleveland Browns	North	4	12	0	.250	1–5	3–9	.590	.469	W1
Tiebreakers (Note: When breaking ties for three or more teams under the NFL's rules, they are first broken within divisions, then comparing only the highest-ranked remaining team from each division.)
