= 2007 Oakland Raiders season =

NFL team season

- Owner: Al Davis
- General manager: Al Davis
- Head coach: Lane Kiffin
- Home stadium: McAfee Coliseum

Results
- Record: 4–12
- Division place: 4th AFC West
- Playoffs: Did not qualify
- Pro Bowlers: Nnamdi Asomugha, CB; Shane Lechler, P

The 2007 Oakland Raiders season was the 48th overall season of the Oakland Raiders franchise, the franchise's 38th season in the National Football League (NFL), their 13th season since their return to Oakland and the 1st season under head coach Lane Kiffin. The team finished the season with a 4–12 record. It began with the team's fourth head coach in six seasons.

By virtue of the team's 2–14 finish in 2006 (the worst in the NFL for that year), they acquired the first overall pick in the 2007 NFL draft. With that first pick, the Raiders selected LSU quarterback JaMarcus Russell, who went on to be one of the biggest busts in NFL history.

As in 2005 and 2006, the Raiders faced both participants from the previous season's Super Bowl. In 2007, they had home games scheduled against the Chicago Bears and Indianapolis Colts from Super Bowl XLI. They lost to both teams.

== Offseason ==
The first casualty of the Raiders' disastrous 2006 season was head coach Art Shell, who was fired on January 4, 2007. His career record as head coach of the Raiders (including playoffs) was 58–56. The team interviewed a number of candidates after Shell's firing, including San Diego Chargers assistant coach James Lofton, former New York Giants head coach Jim Fassel, and Raiders defensive coordinator Rob Ryan. USC assistant head coach Steve Sarkisian, considered to be the front runner for the position, withdrew his name from consideration on January 19. On January 22, the team announced the hiring of 31-year-old USC offensive coordinator Lane Kiffin, the youngest coach in franchise history and the youngest coach in the NFL.

Kiffin's first staffing hire was former Atlanta Falcons offensive coordinator Greg Knapp, who accepted the same position in Oakland on January 28.

Oakland signed Super Bowl winning running back Dominic Rhodes away from the Indianapolis Colts on March 9, 2007. The next day, the Raiders brought in Justin Griffith from the Atlanta Falcons to help the blocking game.

With the first overall pick in the 2007 NFL draft the Raiders selected quarterback JaMarcus Russell from LSU.

=== Draft Selections ===
2007 Oakland Raiders draft
Round	Pick	Player	Position	College	Notes
1	1	JaMarcus Russell	QB	LSU	
2	38	Zach Miller	TE	Arizona State	
3	65	Quentin Moses	DE	Georgia	
3	91	Mario Henderson	OT	Florida State	
3	99	Johnnie Lee Higgins	WR	UTEP	
4	100	Michael Bush	RB	Louisville	
4	110	John Bowie	CB	Cincinnati	
5	138	Jay Richardson	DE	Ohio State	
5	165	Eric Frampton	SS	Washington State	
6	175	Oren O'Neal	FB	Arkansas State	
7	254	Jonathan Holland	WR	Louisiana Tech	
Made roster † Pro Football Hall of Fame * Made at least one Pro Bowl during career

== Players ==
Oakland Raiders 2007 final roster
Quarterbacks: 12 Josh McCown; 8 Daunte Culpepper; 2 JaMarcus Russell; 16 Andrew Walter; Running backs: 36 Justin Griffith FB; 34 LaMont Jordan; 46 Oren O'Neal FB; 33 Dominic Rhodes; Wide receivers: 89 Ronald Curry; 17 Tim Dwight PR; 15 Johnnie Lee Higgins PR; 14 Chris McFoy; 84 Jerry Porter; Tight ends: 85 John Madsen; 80 Zach Miller; 86 Tony Stewart	Offensive linemen: 66 Cooper Carlisle G; 76 Robert Gallery G; 75 Mario Henderson T; 79 Paul McQuistan G/T; 51 Chris Morris C; 60 Jeremy Newberry C; 77 Jonathan Palmer G/T; 65 Barry Sims T; 72 Seth Wand G/T; 63 Mark Wilson T; Defensive linemen: 91 Tyler Brayton DE; 56 Derrick Burgess DE; 58 Chris Clemons DE; 98 Jay Richardson DE; 90 Terdell Sands DT; 99 Warren Sapp DT; 95 Josh Shaw DT; 61 Gerard Warren DT	Linebackers: 94 Jon Alston OLB; 57 Ricky Brown OLB; 50 Isaiah Ekejiuba MLB; 53 Thomas Howard OLB; 52 Kirk Morrison MLB; 55 Robert Thomas OLB; 54 Sam Williams OLB; Defensive backs: 21 Nnamdi Asomugha CB; 28 Rashad Baker SS; 35 John Bowie CB; 23 Chris Carr CB/KR/PR; 31 Hiram Eugene FS; 24 Michael Huff SS; 37 Chris Johnson CB; 26 Stanford Routt CB; 30 Stuart Schweigert FS; 27 Fabian Washington CB; Special teams: 59 Jon Condo LS; 11 Sebastian Janikowski K; 9 Shane Lechler P	Reserve lists: 29 Michael Bush RB (NF-Inj.); 40 Jarrod Cooper S (IR); 8 Daunte Culpepper QB (IR); 25 Justin Fargas RB (IR); 74 Cornell Green T (IR); 64 Jake Grove C (IR); 18 Jonathan Holland WR (IR); 93 Tommy Kelly DE (IR); 42 ReShard Lee RB (IR); 47 Fred Wakefield TE (IR); Practice squad: 70 Jesse Boone C; 92 Mkristo Bruce DE; 83 Daniel Fells TE; 13 Drisan James WR; 96 Jonathan Lewis DT; 44 Quinton Smith RB; 81 Matt Trannon WR; rookies in italics 53 active, 10 inactive, 7 practice squad

== Staff ==
Oakland Raiders 2007 coaching staff
Front office: President/Managing General Partner – Al Davis; Head coaches: Head coach – Lane Kiffin; Offensive coaches: Offensive coordinator – Greg Knapp; Quarterbacks – John DeFilippo; Running backs – Tom Rathman; Wide receivers – Charles Coe; Tight ends – Kelly Skipper; Offensive line – Tom Cable; Assistant offensive line – James Cregg; Offensive quality control – Adam Henry; Offensive quality control – Sanjay Lal	Defensive coaches: Defensive coordinator – Rob Ryan; Defensive line – Keith Millard; Assistant defensive line – Don Johnson; Linebackers – Don Martindale; Defensive backs – Darren Perry; Defensive backs/squad development – Willie Brown; Assistant defensive backs – Randy Hanson; Defensive quality control – George Martinez; Special teams coaches: Special teams coordinator – Brian Schneider; Special teams quality control – Curtis Fuller; Strength and conditioning: Strength and conditioning – Jeff Fish

== Schedule ==
=== Pre-season ===
Week	Date	Opponent	Result	Record	Venue	Recap
1	August 11	Arizona Cardinals	W 27–23	1–0	McAfee Coliseum	Recap
2	August 18	at San Francisco 49ers	L 21–26	1–1	Monster Park	Recap
3	August 24	St. Louis Rams	W 20–10	2–1	McAfee Coliseum	Recap
4	August 30	at Seattle Seahawks	L 14–19	2–2	Qwest Field	Recap

=== Regular season ===
Week	Date	Opponent	Result	Record	Venue	Recap
1	September 9	Detroit Lions	L 21–36	0–1	McAfee Coliseum	Recap
2	September 16	at Denver Broncos	L 20–23	0–2	Invesco Field at Mile High	Recap
3	September 23	Cleveland Browns	W 26–24	1–2	McAfee Coliseum	Recap
4	September 30	at Miami Dolphins	W 35–17	2–2	Dolphin Stadium	Recap
5	Bye					
6	October 14	at San Diego Chargers	L 14–28	2–3	Qualcomm Stadium	Recap
7	October 21	Kansas City Chiefs	L 10–12	2–4	McAfee Coliseum	Recap
8	October 28	at Tennessee Titans	L 9–13	2–5	LP Field	Recap
9	November 4	Houston Texans	L 17–24	2–6	McAfee Coliseum	Recap
10	November 11	Chicago Bears	L 6–17	2–7	McAfee Coliseum	Recap
11	November 18	at Minnesota Vikings	L 22–29	2–8	Hubert H. Humphrey Metrodome	Recap
12	November 25	at Kansas City Chiefs	W 20–17	3–8	Arrowhead Stadium	Recap
13	December 2	Denver Broncos	W 34–20	4–8	McAfee Coliseum	Recap
14	December 9	at Green Bay Packers	L 7–38	4–9	Lambeau Field	Recap
15	December 16	Indianapolis Colts	L 14–21	4–10	McAfee Coliseum	Recap
16	December 23	at Jacksonville Jaguars	L 11–49	4–11	Jacksonville Municipal Stadium	Recap
17	December 30	San Diego Chargers	L 17–30	4–12	McAfee Coliseum	Recap

=== Standings ===
AFC West
	W	L	T	PCT	DIV	CONF	PF	PA	STK
^{(3)} San Diego Chargers	11	5	0	.688	5–1	9–3	412	284	W6
Denver Broncos	7	9	0	.438	3–3	6–6	320	409	W1
Kansas City Chiefs	4	12	0	.250	2–4	3–9	226	335	L9
Oakland Raiders	4	12	0	.250	2–4	4–8	283	398	L4

==== Week 1: vs. Detroit Lions ====
Quarter	1	2	3	4	Total
Lions	0	10	7	19	36
Raiders	0	0	14	7	21

at McAfee Coliseum, Oakland, California

- Date: September 9, 2007
- Game attendance: 61,547
- TV announcers (Fox): Matt Vasgersian (play-by-play) and J.C. Pearson (color commentator)

Game information

First quarter

- No scoring plays

Second quarter

- DET – Roy Williams 13-yard pass from Jon Kitna (Jason Hanson kick), 8:27. Lions 7–0. Drive: 2 plays, 37 yards, 0:46.
- DET – Jason Hanson 46-yard field goal, 1:10. Lions 10–0. Drive: 7 plays, 36 yards, 1:08.

Third quarter

- DET – Calvin Johnson 16-yard pass from Jon Kitna (Jason Hanson kick), 9:15. Lions 17–0. Drive: 4 plays, 33 yards, 2:09.
- OAK – Ronald Curry 4-yard pass from Josh McCown (Sebastian Janikowski kick), 3:49. Lions 17–7. Drive: 6 plays, 62 yards, 2:22.
- OAK – LaMont Jordan 12-yard run (Sebastian Janikowski kick), 0:49. Lions 17–14. Drive: 4 plays, 27 yards, 1:29.

Fourth quarter

- DET – Jason Hanson 46-yard field goal, 12:13. Lions 20–14. Drive: 8 plays, 28 yards, 3:36.
- OAK – Justin Griffith 7-yard pass from Josh McCown (Sebastian Janikowski kick), 7:43. Raiders 21–20. Drive: 8 plays, 70 yards, 4:30.
- DET – Shaun McDonald 32-yard pass from Jon Kitna (pass failed), 4:15. Lions 26–21. Drive: 7 plays, 80 yards, 3:28.
- DET – Jason Hanson 23-yard field goal, 1:56. Lions 29–21. Drive: 4 plays, 5 yards, 1:05.
- DET – Tatum Bell 14-yard run (Jason Hanson kick), 1:16. Lions 36–21. Drive: 3 plays, 23 yards, 0:21.

Top passers

- DET – Jon Kitna – 27/36, 289 yards, 3 TD, 2 INT
- OAK – Josh McCown – 30/40, 313 yards, 2 TD, 2 INT

Top rushers

- DET – Tatum Bell – 15 rushes, 87 yards, TD
- OAK – LaMont Jordan – 15 rushes, 70 yards, TD

Top receivers

- DET – Shaun McDonald – 6 receptions, 90 yards, TD
- OAK – Ronald Curry – 10 receptions, 133 yards, TD

With Josh McCown getting the start at quarterback, the Raiders began their 2007 campaign at home in an interconference fight with the Detroit Lions. After a scoreless first quarter, Oakland trailed early as Lions QB Jon Kitna completed a 13-yard TD pass to WR Roy Williams. Detroit increased its lead before halftime with kicker Jason Hanson getting a 46-yard field goal.

In the third quarter, the Lions continued with their early lead as Kitna completed a 16-yard TD pass to rookie WR Calvin Johnson. Afterwards, the Raiders began to come back as McCown completed a 4-yard TD pass to WR Ronald Curry, followed by RB LaMont Jordan getting a 12-yard TD run. In the fourth quarter, Detroit responded with Hanson kicking a 46-yard field goal, while Oakland took the lead with McCown completing a 7-yard TD pass to FB Justin Griffith. However, their lead didn't hold as the Lions scored 17 unanswered points (a 32-yard TD pass from Kitna to WR Shaun McDonald, Hanson getting a 23-yard field goal, and RB Tatum Bell getting a 14-yard TD run) to end the game.

With the loss, Oakland began their season at 0–1.

==== Week 2: at Denver Broncos ====
Quarter	1	2	3	4	OT	Total
Raiders	0	3	7	10	0	20
Broncos	7	10	0	3	3	23

at Invesco Field at Mile High, Denver

- Date: September 16, 2007
- Game attendance: 78,784
- TV announcers (CBS): Kevin Harlan (play-by-play) and Rich Gannon (color commentator)

Hoping to rebound from their embarrassing home loss to the Lions, the Raiders flew to Invesco Field at Mile High for an AFC West duel with the Denver Broncos. In the first quarter, Oakland trailed early as Broncos QB Jay Cutler completed a 9-yard TD pass to WR Brandon Stokley for the only score of the period. In the second quarter, the Raiders got on the board with kicker Sebastian Janikowski getting a 38-yard field goal. However, Denver continued to pound away as RB Cecil Sapp got a 4-yard TD run, while kicker Jason Elam got a 23-yard field goal.

In the third quarter, Oakland began to come back as QB Josh McCown (who was a gametime decision heading into the game) completed a 46-yard TD pass to WR Jerry Porter for the only score of the period. In the fourth quarter, the Raiders took the lead as DT Gerard Warren sacked Cutler in the end zone for a safety, while LB Thomas Howard returned an interception 44 yards for a touchdown (followed by a successful two-point conversion pass from McCown to WR Ronald Curry). However, the Broncos tied the game up with Elam's 20-yard field goal. In overtime, Oakland managed to make Denver go three-and-out on their first possession. A 33-yard run by RB LaMont Jordan helped set up Janikowski for a game-winning 52-yard field goal. Broncos head coach Mike Shanahan called timeout before the kick could begin. Janikowski's second try hit off the very tip of the left goal post and was no good, giving Denver a chance to win the game. The Broncos won with Elam getting a 23-yard field goal.

With the loss, not only did the Raiders fall to 0–2, but they had lost 11-straight games (currently the NFL's longest losing streak) dating back to Week 9 of the 2006 season.

==== Week 3: vs. Cleveland Browns ====
Quarter	1	2	3	4	Total
Browns	0	10	7	7	24
Raiders	3	13	7	3	26

at McAfee Coliseum, Oakland, California

- Date: September 23, 2007
- Game attendance: 51,075
- TV announcers (CBS): Bill Macatee (play-by-play) and Steve Beuerlein (color commentator)

Though the Raiders had lost eleven straight games dating back to Week 9 of the 2006 season, they were favored to beat the Cleveland Browns.

Sebastian Janikowski kicked a 32-yard field goal with a 3–0 lead with 37 seconds left in the 1st quarter. Sebastian Janikowski kicked a 22-yard field goal, and the Raiders lead 6–0 with 11 minutes left in the 2nd quarter. Josh McCown threw a 41-yard touchdown pass to Ronald Curry with a good point after touchdown (PAT). The Raiders lead 13–0 with 4 minutes and 45 seconds left in the 2nd quarter. Sebastian Janikowski kicked a 23-yard field goal. The Raiders lead 16–0 with 2 minutes and 5 seconds left in the 2nd quarter. Joshua Cribbs returns a 99-yard kickoff return for a touchdown with a good point after touchdown with the Raiders leading 16–7 with 1 minute and 53 seconds left in the 2nd quarter. Phil Dawson kicked a 23-yard field goal with the Raiders still in the lead, 16–10 with 11 seconds left in the 2nd quarter. After halftime, Derek Anderson threw a 21-yard touchdown pass to Braylon Edwards with an extra point, and the Browns lead 17–16 with 9 minutes and 16 seconds left in the 3rd quarter. LaMont Jordan runs a 1-yard touchdown with an extra point, Raiders lead 23–17 with 11 seconds left in the 3rd quarter. Sebastian Janikowski kicked a 48-yard field goal with the Raiders leading 26–17 with 8 minutes and 11 seconds left in the 4th quarter. Derek Anderson runs a 1-yard touchdown and extra point with the Raiders still leading 26–24 with 3 minutes and 33 seconds left in the 4th quarter. After getting the ball back with 1:04 left on the clock, Derek Anderson drove the Browns down to the Oakland 22-yard line. However, as the ball for Dawson's game-winning field goal was snapped, Raiders coach Lane Kiffin called a timeout, imitating the strategy used by the Denver Broncos last week. On Dawson's second attempt, the ball was blocked by Tommy Kelly, ending the game and ending an 11-game losing streak for the Raiders as they improved to 1–2.

==== Week 4: at Miami Dolphins ====
Quarter	1	2	3	4	Total
Raiders	14	0	7	14	35
Dolphins	0	7	10	0	17

at Dolphin Stadium, Miami Gardens, Florida

- Date: September 30, 2007
- Game attendance: 70,621
- TV announcers (CBS): Gus Johnson (play-by-play) and Steve Tasker (color commentator)

Coming off a last-second home win over the Browns, the Raiders flew to Dolphin Stadium for a Week 4 duel with the winless Miami Dolphins. With QB Josh McCown out with an injury, QB Daunte Culpepper got a chance to get redemption against his former team. The game was delayed for 30 minutes due to thunderstorms in the Miami area.

In the first quarter, Oakland got off to a fast start with Culpepper completing a 7-yard TD pass to WR Jerry Porter, along with getting a 2-yard TD run. In the second quarter, the Dolphins responded with RB Ronnie Brown getting a 9-yard TD run for the only score of the period. In the third quarter, Miami drew closer with kicker Jay Feely nailing a 29-yard field goal. The Raiders continued their offensive revival with Culpepper getting a 5-yard TD run. The Dolphins responded with QB Trent Green completing a 3-yard TD pass to TE Justin Peelle. In the fourth quarter, Oakland sealed its first road win since Week 11 of the 2005 season with Culpepper hooking up with Porter again on a 27-yard TD pass, along with getting a 3-yard TD run.

With the win, the Raiders entered their bye week at 2–2.

==== Week 6: at San Diego Chargers ====
Quarter	1	2	3	4	Total
Raiders	0	7	0	7	14
Chargers	14	0	7	7	28

at Qualcomm Stadium, San Diego, California

- Date: October 14, 2007
- Game attendance: 67,523
- TV announcers (CBS): Dick Enberg (play-by-play) and Randy Cross (color commentator)

Coming off their bye week, the Raiders flew to Qualcomm Stadium for their Week 6 divisional duel with the San Diego Chargers. In the first quarter, Oakland trailed early as Chargers RB LaDainian Tomlinson got a 3-yard and a 27-yard TD run. In the second quarter, the Raiders responded with LB Thomas Howard returning an interception 66 yards for a touchdown, along with the only score of the period.

In the third quarter, San Diego replied with Tomlinson getting a 13-yard TD run for the only score of the period. In the fourth quarter, Oakland tried to rally as QB Daunte Culpepper completed a 1-yard TD pass to rookie TE Zach Miller. The Chargers destroyed any remaining signs of hope with Tomlinson getting a 41-yard TD run.

With the loss, the Raiders fell to 2–3.

==== Week 7: vs. Kansas City Chiefs ====
Quarter	1	2	3	4	Total
Chiefs	3	3	0	6	12
Raiders	0	0	7	3	10

at McAfee Coliseum, Oakland, California

- Date: October 21, 2007
- Game attendance: 62,240
- TV announcers (CBS): Jim Nantz (play-by-play) and Phil Simms (color commentator)

Hoping to rebound from their divisional road loss to the Chargers, the Raiders went home for a Week 7 divisional duel with their nemesis, the Kansas City Chiefs. In the first half, Oakland trailed as Chiefs kicker Dave Rayner got a 41-yard field goal in the first quarter and a 31-yard field goal in the second quarter. In the third quarter, the Raiders got on the board with QB Daunte Culpepper completing a 21-yard TD pass to WR Ronald Curry for the only score of the period. In the fourth quarter, Kansas City retook the lead with RB Larry Johnson getting a 1-yard TD run (with a failed 2-point conversion). Oakland managed to respond with kicker Sebastian Janikowski getting a 37-yard field goal, along with trying to turn a late-game drive into some winning points. The game ended with an interception.

With the loss, not only did the Raiders fall to 2–4, but it also marked their 17th-straight divisional loss, the most since 1970.

==== Week 8: at Tennessee Titans ====
Quarter	1	2	3	4	Total
Raiders	3	6	0	0	9
Titans	3	0	7	3	13

at LP Field, Nashville, Tennessee

- Date: October 28, 2007
- Game attendance: 69,143
- TV announcers (CBS): Kevin Harlan (play-by-play) and Rich Gannon (color commentator)

Trying to snap a two-game skid, the Raiders flew to LP Field for a Week 8 intraconference duel with the Tennessee Titans. In the first quarter, Oakland struck first with kicker Sebastian Janikowski getting a 50-yard field goal. The Titans responded with kicker Rob Bironas getting a 35-yard field goal. In the second quarter, the Raiders jumped back into the lead with Janikowski kicking a 43-yard and a 54-yard field goal.

In the third quarter, Tennessee drew close with RB Chris Henry getting a 24-yard TD run for the only score of the period. In the fourth quarter, the Titans took the lead with Bironas getting a 23-yard field goal. QB Daunte Culpepper tried to lead Oakland back into the lead, but Tennessee's defense held them off.

With their third-straight loss, not only did the Raiders fall to 2–5, but they have now lost 14 out of their last 15 road games.

==== Week 9: vs. Houston Texans ====
Quarter	1	2	3	4	Total
Texans	7	10	0	7	24
Raiders	0	0	3	14	17

at McAfee Coliseum, Oakland, California

- Date: November 4, 2007
- Game attendance: 49,603
- TV announcers (CBS): Gus Johnson (play-by-play) and Steve Tasker (color commentator)

Trying to snap a three-game skid, the Raiders went home for a Week 9 intraconference duel with the Houston Texans. In the first quarter, Oakland's struggles continued as Texans RB Ahman Green got an 8-yard TD run for the only score of the period. In the second quarter, things continued to get worse the Raiders as Houston increased its lead with RB Ron Dayne getting a 14-yard TD run, while kicker Kris Brown nailed a 40-yard field goal.

In the third quarter, Oakland finally managed to get on the board as kicker Sebastian Janikowski nailed a 22-yard field goal for the only score of the period. In the fourth quarter, the Raiders drew closer as RB Justin Fargas got a 1-yard TD run. The Texans pulled away as QB Sage Rosenfels completed a 42-yard TD pass to WR André Davis. Oakland's only response was QB Josh McCown completing a 28-yard TD pass to WR Tim Dwight.

With their fourth-straight loss, the Raiders fell to 2–6.

==== Week 10: vs. Chicago Bears ====
Quarter	1	2	3	4	Total
Bears	0	3	0	14	17
Raiders	3	0	0	3	6

at McAfee Coliseum, Oakland, California

- Date: November 11, 2007
- Game attendance: 62,715
- TV announcers (Fox): Matt Vasgersian (play-by-play) and J.C. Pearson (color commentator)

Trying to snap a four-game losing skid, the Raiders stayed at home for a Week 10 interconference duel with the defending NFC champions, the Chicago Bears. In the first quarter, Oakland struck first with kicker Sebastian Janikowski getting a 37-yard field goal for the only score of the period. In the second quarter, the Bears tied the game with kicker Robbie Gould getting a 32-yard field goal for the only score of the period.

After a scoreless third quarter, the Raiders regained the lead with Janikowski nailing a 52-yard field goal. Oakland's struggles continued as QB Rex Grossman completed a 59-yard TD pass to WR Bernard Berrian, along with RB Cedric Benson getting a 3-yard TD run.

With their fifth-straight loss, the Raiders fell to 2–7.

==== Week 11: at Minnesota Vikings ====
Quarter	1	2	3	4	Total
Raiders	3	16	0	3	22
Vikings	9	10	3	7	29

at Hubert H. Humphrey Metrodome, Minneapolis, Minnesota

- Date: November 18, 2007
- Game attendance: 62,960
- TV announcers (CBS): Dick Enberg (play-by-play) and Randy Cross (color commentator)

Trying to snap a five-game skid, the Raiders flew to the Hubert H. Humphrey Metrodome for a Week 11 interconference duel with the Minnesota Vikings, as QB Daunte Culpepper got the start against his former team.

In the first quarter, Oakland trailed early as Vikings RB Chester Taylor managed to get a 10-yard TD run, along with a safety (due to Culpepper committing a penalty while in his own endzone). The Raiders got on the board as kicker Sebastian Janikowski managed to get a 42-yard field goal. In the second quarter, Minnesota increased its lead with kicker Ryan Longwell getting a 30-yard field goal. Afterwards, Oakland took the lead as Culpepper completed a 10-yard TD pass to TE John Madsen, along with Janikowski kicking a 30-yard field goal. The Vikings answered with Taylor getting a 38-yard TD run. The Raiders tied the game heading into halftime as Janikowski kicked a 42-yard and a 49-yard field goal.

In the third quarter, Minnesota regained the lead with Longwell kicking a 38-yard field goal for the only score of the period. In the fourth quarter, the Vikings ended its scoring day with Taylor getting a 6-yard TD run. Oakland tried to come back as Janikowski nailed a 52-yard field goal. However, Minnesota held on for the win.

With their sixth-straight loss, the Raiders fell to 2–8, securing the team's fifth consecutive non-winning season.

==== Week 12: at Kansas City Chiefs ====
Quarter	1	2	3	4	Total
Raiders	3	3	7	7	20
Chiefs	7	3	7	0	17

at Arrowhead Stadium, Kansas City, Missouri

- Date: November 25, 2007
- Game attendance: 76,210
- TV announcers (CBS): Ian Eagle (play-by-play) and Solomon Wilcots (color commentator)

Trying to snap a six-game losing skid, the Raiders flew to Arrowhead Stadium for a Week 12 AFC West rematch with the Kansas City Chiefs. In the first quarter, Oakland took the early lead as kicker Sebastian Janikowski managed to get a 25-yard field goal. However, the Chiefs took the lead with RB Kolby Smith getting a 10-yard TD run. In the second quarter, the Raiders drew closer as Janikowski kicked a 54-yard field goal. However, Kansas City managed to get one last strike prior to halftime as kicker Dave Rayner nailed a 30-yard field goal.

In the third quarter, Oakland regained the lead with RB LaMont Jordan getting a 5-yard TD run. However, the Chiefs retook the lead with Smith getting a 5-yard TD run. In the fourth quarter, the Raiders once again jumped into the lead as RB Justin Fargas got a 14-yard TD run. This time, the defense managed to hold on for the win.

With the win, not only did the Raiders improve to 3–8, but they managed to do four things with their one win. First, they snapped their six-game losing skid. Second, they snapped a nine-game losing skid to the Chiefs. Third, they snapped a 17-game losing streak against divisional opponents with their first divisional win since 2004. And finally, they surpassed their regular season win total from last season.

==== Week 13: vs. Denver Broncos ====
Quarter	1	2	3	4	Total
Broncos	7	0	6	7	20
Raiders	7	7	10	10	34

at McAfee Coliseum, Oakland, California

- Date: December 2, 2007
- Game attendance: 61,990
- TV announcers (CBS): Bill Macatee (play-by-play) and Steve Beuerlein (color commentator)

Coming off their divisional road win over the Chiefs, the Raiders went home for a Week 13 AFC West rematch with the Denver Broncos. In the first quarter, Oakland stormed ahead early as QB Josh McCown completed a 15-yard TD pass to WR Tim Dwight. Afterwards, the Broncos answered with RB Travis Henry getting a 4-yard TD run. In the second quarter, the Raiders regained the lead with McCown completing a 13-yard TD pass to TE Zach Miller for the only score of the period.

In the third quarter, Oakland increased its lead with kicker Sebastian Janikowski getting a 38-yard field goal, while McCown completed a 13-yard TD pass to WR Jerry Porter. Denver managed to keep itself in the game with kicker Jason Elam getting a 29-yard and a 44-yard field goal. In the fourth quarter, the Broncos got close as Henry got a 3-yard TD run. Afterwards, the Raiders pulled away with Janikowski connecting on a 44-yard field goal, while RB Justin Fargas managed to get a 5-yard TD run.

With the win, Oakland improved to 4–8.

For the Raiders, the win marked back-to-back divisional win after losing their previous 17 AFC West games.

During the second quarter, rookie QB JaMarcus Russell made his NFL debut as he completed 4 of 7 for 56 yards.

==== Week 14 at Green Bay Packers ====
Quarter	1	2	3	4	Total
Raiders	0	7	0	0	7
Packers	0	14	17	7	38

at Lambeau Field, Green Bay, Wisconsin

- Date: December 9, 2007
- Game attendance: 70,828
- TV announcers (CBS): Kevin Harlan (play-by-play) and Rich Gannon (color commentator)

Trying to look for their first three-game winning streak since 2002, the Raiders travel to Green Bay to face the Packers. Oakland and Green Bay did not score in first quarter, but score in the second. Halfback Ryan Grant run a six-yard touchdown with kicker Mason Crosby kicking an extra point. Later, Raiders' punter Shane Lechler punts the ball to Will Blackmon with a fifty seven-yard punt return for a touchdown and Crosby kicks for an extra point. Later on the second quarter, quarterback Josh McCown throws a twenty five-yard touchdown pass to wide receiver Jerry Porter with a Sebastian Janikowski point after touchdown. In the third quarter, Mason Crosby kicks a forty four-yard field goal. Quarterback Brett Favre throws an eight-yard touchdown pass to wide receiver Greg Jennings with Mason Crosby extra point. With a Raiders possession, quarterback Josh McCown fumbles in Raiders' end zone and cornerback Will Blackmon recovers the fumble in the end zone for a touchdown. And again, Crosby kicks an extra point. In fourth quarter, Brett Favre throws a forty six-yard touchdown pass to tight end Donald Lee with Crosby kicking an extra point.

With the loss, the Raiders fell to 4–9, marking their fifth-straight losing season since their Super Bowl XXXVII appearance.

==== Week 15: vs. Indianapolis Colts ====
Quarter	1	2	3	4	Total
Colts	10	0	3	8	21
Raiders	0	7	0	7	14

at McAfee Coliseum, Oakland, California

- Date: December 16, 2007
- Game attendance: 62,000
- TV announcers (CBS): Dick Enberg (play-by-play) and Randy Cross (color commentator)

Hoping to rebound from their road loss to the Packers, the Raiders went home for a Week 15 intraconference duel with the defending Super Bowl champions, the Indianapolis Colts. In the first quarter, Oakland trailed early as Colts kicker Adam Vinatieri managed to get a 22-yard field goal, while CB T.J. Rushing returned a punt 90 yards for a touchdown. In the second quarter, the Raiders got on the board with QB Josh McCown completing a 3-yard TD pass to WR Ronald Curry for the only score of the period.

In the third quarter, Indianapolis increased its lead with Vinatieri nailing a 19-yard field goal for the only score of the period. In the fourth quarter, Oakland took the lead with RB Justin Fargas getting a 2-yard run. However, the Colts sealed the win with QB Peyton Manning completing a 20-yard TD pass to WR Anthony Gonzalez.

With the loss, not only did the Raiders fall to 4–10, but it also marked their 5th-straight time in which Oakland had at least 10 losses in a season.

During this game Justin Fargas rushed for a season total of 1,000 yards, despite being given the starting job for nine games.

==== Week 16 at Jacksonville Jaguars ====
Quarter	1	2	3	4	Total
Raiders	3	0	0	8	11
Jaguars	14	14	7	14	49

at Jacksonville Municipal Stadium, Jacksonville, Florida

- Date: December 23, 2007
- Game attendance: 66,905
- TV announcers (CBS): Ian Eagle (play-by-play) and Solomon Wilcots (color commentator)

Game information

First quarter

- JAX – Fred Taylor 62-yard run (Josh Scobee kick), 12:02. Jaguars 7–0. Drive: 1 play, 67 yards, 0:45.
- JAX – Maurice Jones-Drew 14-yard run (Josh Scobee kick), 3:21. Jaguars 14–0. Drive: 7 plays, 85 yards, 3:42.

Second quarter

- OAK – Sebastian Janikowski 41-yard field goal, 13:59. Jaguars 14–3. Drive: 9 plays, 21 yards, 0:51.
- JAX – Greg Jones 2-yard pass from David Garrard (Josh Scobee kick), 9:12. Jaguars 21–3. Drive: 1 play, 2 yards, 0:04.
- JAX – David Garrard 2-yard run (Josh Scobee kick), 6:08. Jaguars 28–3. Drive: 3 plays, 34 yards, 1:31.

Third quarter

- JAX – Matt Jones 37-yard pass from David Garrard (Josh Scobee kick), 6:16. Jaguars 35–3. Drive: 7 plays, 95 yards, 3:53.

Fourth quarter

- JAX – Reggie Williams 9-yard pass from Quinn Gray (Josh Scobee kick), 13:00. Jaguars 42–3. Drive: 6 plays, 29 yards, 2:55.
- JAX – Richard Angulo 7-yard pass from Quinn Gray (Josh Scobee kick), 4:52. Jaguars 49–3. Drive: 3 plays, 14 yards, 1:28.
- OAK – Zach Miller 2-yard pass from JaMarcus Russell (JaMarcus Russell pass to Ronald Curry), 0:06. Jaguars 49–11. Drive: 12 plays, 70 yards, 4:46.

Top passers

- OAK – JaMarcus Russell – 7/23, 83 yards, TD, 3 INT
- JAX – David Garrard – 11/18, 199 yards, 2 TD, INT

Top rushers

- OAK – Dominic Rhodes – 27 rushes, 115 yards
- JAX – Fred Taylor – 7 rushes, 111 yards, TD

Top receivers

- OAK – Zach Miller – 3 receptions, 27 yards, TD
- JAX – Maurice Jones-Drew – 6 receptions, 96 yards

The Raiders were stymied almost totally by the Jaguars in Week 16. The Raiders defense allowed seven touchdowns: two passing TDs each from David Garrard and Jaguars backup QB Quinn Gray, and three rushing TDs. The Raiders only managed 215 yards of total offense.

The game was punctuated by an ugly incident with 21 seconds left in the first half, where Warren Sapp argued with officials over a penalty the team wanted to accept. The argument led to four unsportsmanlike conduct penalties against the Raiders, three of them on Sapp, and Sapp was ejected from the game. Although one of the officials accused Sapp of bumping him, he was not suspended.

JaMarcus Russell entered the game during the first quarter, and played the rest of the game. Although he threw three interceptions, he finally threw his first career touchdown pass in the NFL, to Zach Miller, with 11 seconds to go in the game. He followed it up with a pass to Ronald Curry for a two-point conversion. Dominic Rhodes rushed for 115 yards. Kirk Morrison managed to intercept a pass by David Garrard, one of only three picks the Jaguars QB threw all season.

With the loss, the Raiders fell to 4–11.

==== Week 17 vs. San Diego Chargers ====
Quarter	1	2	3	4	Total
Chargers	7	7	10	6	30
Raiders	7	3	7	0	17

at McAfee Coliseum, Oakland, California

- Date: December 30, 2007
- Game attendance: 61,706
- TV announcers (CBS): Greg Gumbel (play-by-play) and Dan Dierdorf (color commentator)

Game information

First quarter

- SD – LaDainian Tomlinson 7-yard pass from Philip Rivers (Nate Kaeding kick), 9:53. Chargers 7–0. Drive: 9 plays, 47 yards, 4:55.
- OAK – Dominic Rhodes 1-yard run (Sebastian Janikowski kick), 4:31. Tied 7–7. Drive: 3 plays, 35 yards, 1:14.

Second quarter

- SD – Chris Chambers 19-yard pass from Philip Rivers (Nate Kaeding kick), 0:38. Chargers 14–7. Drive: 9 plays, 80 yards, 2:28.
- OAK – Sebastian Janikowski 53-yard field goal, 0:00. Chargers 14–10. Drive: 5 plays, 37 yards, 0:38.

Third quarter

- SD – Nate Kaeding 36-yard field goal, 12:51. Chargers 17–10. Drive: 6 plays, 16 yards, 2:09.
- SD – Jyles Tucker 0-yard fumble return (Nate Kaeding kick), 7:12. Chargers 24–10.
- OAK – Jerry Porter 32-yard pass from JaMarcus Russell (Sebastian Janikowski kick), 1:19. Chargers 24–17. Drive: 2 plays, 40 yards, 0:45.

Fourth quarter

- SD – Nate Kaeding 31-yard field goal, 13:36. Chargers 27–17. Drive: 6 plays, 32 yards, 2:43.
- SD – Nate Kaeding 24-yard field goal, 1:46. Chargers 30–17. Drive: 8 plays, 7 yards, 0:46.

Top passers

- SD – Philip Rivers – 13/23, 135 yards, 2 TD
- OAK – JaMarcus Russell – 23/31, 224 yards, TD, INT

Top rushers

- SD – LaDainian Tomlinson – 16 rushes, 56 yards
- OAK – Dominic Rhodes – 29 rushes, 122 yards, TD

Top receivers

- SD – Antonio Gates – 6 receptions, 62 yards
- OAK – Zach Miller – 8 receptions, 84 yards

After a lackluster performance in Jacksonville, JaMarcus Russell made his first career start at home against divisional rival San Diego. Russell still had some difficulty with turnovers as he threw an interception early in the game and fumbled the ball which was recovered in the end zone by San Diego for a touchdown. He did, however, improve his passing game by throwing for over 200 yards including a touchdown to Jerry Porter, his first touchdown at home as a Raider.

Oakland lost their final game of their season. They finished at 4–12, which was an improvement over last year's 2–14 record.

== Notes ==
Preceded by 2006 Oakland Raiders season	2007 Oakland Raiders season	Succeeded by 2008 Oakland Raiders season
