= 2005 Oakland Raiders season =

NFL team season

- Owner: Al Davis
- General manager: Al Davis
- Head coach: Norv Turner
- Home stadium: McAfee Coliseum

Results
- Record: 4–12
- Division place: 4th AFC West
- Playoffs: Did not qualify
- Pro Bowlers: Derrick Burgess, DE

The 2005 Oakland Raiders season was the franchise's 36th season in the National Football League (NFL), the 46th overall, the 11th back in Oakland, and the second and final under head coach Norv Turner. They were unable to improve upon their previous season's output of 5–11, instead only going 4–12. The team finished the season on a six-game losing streak.

The Raiders acquired Randy Moss from the Minnesota Vikings in a trade for linebacker Napoleon Harris and a first-round draft pick. The acquisition of Moss sought to help with the team's struggling receiving corps for the past two years. However, Moss struggled in his first season with the Raiders, and he finished the season with only 60 receptions. Also signing running back Lamont Jordan to help improve the running game as Tyrone Wheatley retired in the offseason.

== Offseason ==
The Raiders acquired running back LaMont Jordan and defensive end Derrick Burgess in free agency.

=== NFL draft ===
2005 Oakland Raiders draft
Round	Pick	Player	Position	College	Notes
1	23	Fabian Washington	CB	Nebraska	
2	38	Stanford Routt	CB	Houston	
3	69	Andrew Walter	QB	Arizona State	
3	78	Kirk Morrison	LB	San Diego State	
6	175	Anttaj Hawthorne	DT	Wisconsin	
6	212	Ryan Riddle	DE	California	
6	214	Pete McMahon	OT	Iowa	
Made roster † Pro Football Hall of Fame * Made at least one Pro Bowl during career

=== Trades ===
- Traded LB Napoleon Harris, 2005 first round pick (#7 overall), and 2005 seventh round pick to Minnesota Vikings for WR Randy Moss.
- Traded TE Doug Jolley, 2005 second round pick (#47), two 2005 sixth round picks (#182) and (#185) to New York Jets for 2005 first round pick (#26), 2005 seventh round pick (#230).
- Traded 2005 first round pick (#26), 2005 fifth round pick (#105) to Seattle Seahawks for 2005 first round pick (#23).

== Coaching staff ==
2005 Oakland Raiders staff
Head coaches: Head coach – Norv Turner; Assistant head coach/offensive coordinator – Jimmy Raye; Offensive coaches: Quarterbacks – John Shoop; Running backs – Skip Peete; Wide receivers – Fred Biletnikoff; Offensive line – Jim Colletto; Offensive assistant – Chris Turner	Defensive coaches: Defensive coordinator – Rob Ryan; Defensive line – Sam Clancy; Defensive line – Keith Millard; Inside linebackers – Don Martindale; Outside linebackers – Pat Jones; Defensive backs – Clayton Lopez; Defensive backs – Chuck Pagano; Quality control/defense – Chris Griswold; Squad development – Willie Brown; Special teams coaches: Special teams coordinator – Joe Avezzano; Specials teams assistant – Martin Bayless; Strength and conditioning: Strength and conditioning – Jeff Fish

== Roster ==
2005 Oakland Raiders roster
Quarterbacks: 5 Kerry Collins; 8 Marques Tuiasosopo; 16 Andrew Walter; Running backs: 32 Zack Crockett FB; 33 Omar Easy FB; 20 Justin Fargas; 49 J. P. Foschi FB; 34 LaMont Jordan; Wide receivers: 82 Carlos Francis; 85 Doug Gabriel; 19 Johnnie Morant; 18 Randy Moss; 84 Jerry Porter; 87 Alvis Whitted; 86 Randal Williams; Tight ends: 47 James Adkisson; 83 Courtney Anderson; 88 Zeron Flemister	Offensive linemen: 70 Brad Badger G; 76 Robert Gallery OT; 64 Jake Grove C; 71 Corey Hulsey G; 75 Brad Lekkerkerker OT; 78 Chad Slaughter OT; 65 Barry Sims OT; 67 Ron Stone G; Defensive linemen: 56 Derrick Burgess DE; 98 Bobby Hamilton DE; 77 Anttaj Hawthorne DT; 95 Ed Jasper DT; 93 Tommy Kelly DE; 90 Terdell Sands DT; 92 Ted Washington DT	Linebackers: 91 Tyler Brayton OLB; 55 Danny Clark MLB; 59 DeLawrence Grant OLB; 50 Isaiah Ekejiuba MLB; 96 Grant Irons OLB; 51 Tim Johnson MLB; 52 Kirk Morrison OLB; 57 Ryan Riddle OLB; Defensive backs: 21 Nnamdi Asomugha CB; 37 Calvin Branch FS; 23 Chris Carr CB; 40 Jarrod Cooper SS; 22 Renaldo Hill CB; 26 Stanford Routt CB; 30 Stuart Schweigert FS; 25 Denard Walker CB; 27 Fabian Washington CB; Special teams: 11 Sebastian Janikowski K; 9 Shane Lechler P; 62 Adam Treu LS	Reserve lists: 89 Ronald Curry WR (IR); 36 Derrick Gibson S (IR); 99 Warren Sapp DT (IR); -- Kenny Smith DT (IR); 29 Reggie Tongue S (IR); 66 Langston Walker G (IR); 54 Sam Williams LB (IR); 24 Charles Woodson CB (IR); Practice squad: 31 Hiram Eugene S; 28 DeJuan Green RB; 63 Roderick Green OT; 94 Kevin Huntley DT; 73 Michael Quarshie DT ^{Int'l}; 61 Shaun Rose OT; 45 Zach Tuiasosopo FB; rookies in italics 53 active, 8 inactive, 7 practice squad

== Schedule ==
Week	Date	Opponent	Result	Record	Venue	Attendance
1	September 8	at New England Patriots	L 20–30	0–1	Gillette Stadium	68,756
2	September 18	Kansas City Chiefs	L 17–23	0–2	McAfee Coliseum	62,273
3	September 25	at Philadelphia Eagles	L 20–23	0–3	Lincoln Financial Field	67,735
4	October 2	Dallas Cowboys	W 19–13	1–3	McAfee Coliseum	62,400
5	Bye					
6	October 16	San Diego Chargers	L 14–27	1–4	McAfee Coliseum	52,666
7	October 23	Buffalo Bills	W 38–17	2–4	McAfee Coliseum	42,779
8	October 30	at Tennessee Titans	W 34–25	3–4	The Coliseum	69,149
9	November 6	at Kansas City Chiefs	L 23–27	3–5	Arrowhead Stadium	79,033
10	November 13	Denver Broncos	L 17–31	3–6	McAfee Coliseum	62,779
11	November 20	at Washington Redskins	W 16–13	4–6	FedExField	90,129
12	November 27	Miami Dolphins	L 21–33	4–7	McAfee Coliseum	49,097
13	December 4	at San Diego Chargers	L 10–34	4–8	Qualcomm Stadium	66,436
14	December 11	at New York Jets	L 10–26	4–9	Giants Stadium	77,561
15	December 18	Cleveland Browns	L 7–9	4–10	McAfee Coliseum	41,862
16	December 24	at Denver Broncos	L 3–22	4–11	Invesco Field at Mile High	76,212
17	December 31	New York Giants	L 21–30	4–12	McAfee Coliseum	44,594

== Game summaries ==
=== Week 7: vs. Buffalo Bills ===
Team	1	2	3	4	Total
Bills	7	3	0	7	17
• Raiders	0	17	7	14	38

- Date: October 23
- Location: McAfee Coliseum, Oakland, California
- Game start: 4:15 p.m. EST
- Elapsed time: 3 hours 16 minutes
- Game attendance: 42,779
- Game weather: 59°
- Referee: Pete Morelli
- TV announcers (CBS): Bill Macatee, Rich Gannon
- Source: ESPN.com

Scoring summary
1	6:37	Bills	Lee Evans 5-yard pass from Kelly Holcomb (Rian Lindell kick)	Bills 7–0
2	14:47	Raiders	Sebastian Janikowski 17-yard field goal	Bills 7–3
2	11:43	Raiders	Randy Moss 22-yard pass from Kerry Collins (Sebastian Janikowski kick)	Raiders 10–7
2	4:04	Bills	Rian Lindell 32-yard field goal	Tie 10–10
2	:40	Raiders	LaMont Jordan 1-yard run (Sebastian Janikowski kick)	Raiders 17–10
3	10:10	Raiders	LaMont Jordan 17-yard run (Sebastian Janikowski kick)	Raiders 24–10
4	14:53	Bills	Josh Reed 9-yard pass from Kelly Holcomb (Rian Lindell kick)	Raiders 24–17
4	8:49	Raiders	LaMont Jordan 7-yard run (Sebastian Janikowski kick)	Raiders 31–17
4	:14	Raiders	Zack Crockett 2-yard run (Sebastian Janikowski kick)	Raiders 38–17

== Standings ==
AFC West
	W	L	T	PCT	DIV	CONF	PF	PA	STK
^{(2)} Denver Broncos	13	3	0	.813	5–1	10–2	395	258	W4
Kansas City Chiefs	10	6	0	.625	4–2	9–3	403	325	W2
San Diego Chargers	9	7	0	.563	3–3	7–5	418	312	L2
Oakland Raiders	4	12	0	.250	0–6	2–10	290	383	L6
