= 2006 Oakland Raiders season =

NFL team season

- Owner: Al Davis
- General manager: Al Davis
- Head coach: Art Shell
- Home stadium: McAfee Coliseum

Results
- Record: 2–14
- Division place: 4th in AFC West
- Playoffs: Did not qualify
- Pro Bowlers: Derrick Burgess, DE

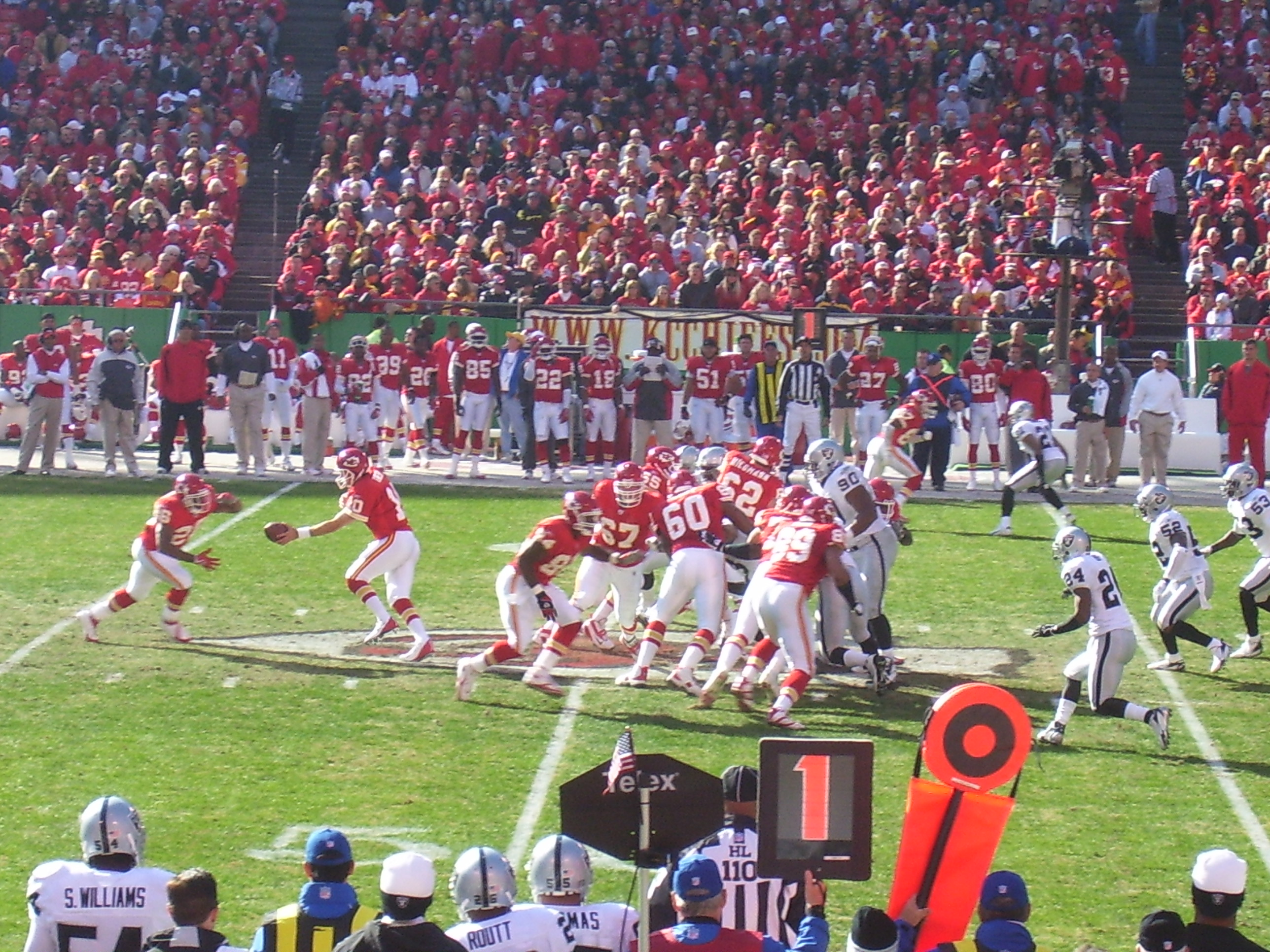
The Kansas City Chiefs host the Raiders in a close-fought week 11 game, November 19, 2006

The 2006 Oakland Raiders season was the franchise's 37th season in the National Football League (NFL), the 47th overall, the 12th back in Oakland, and the only under head coach Art Shell (in his second stint). They failed to improve on their 4–12 record from 2005, and instead went 2–14 for their 4th consecutive losing season. It was the worst record in the 2006 NFL season, the worst season since the team went 1–13 in 1962, and their worst since the NFL went to a 16-game schedule in 1978, thus earning the right to the No. 1 pick in the 2007 NFL draft.

Despite being one of the league's best defenses, the 2006 Raiders' offense struggled heavily, being the worst offense in the league in 2006, having only 168 points scored (10.5 per game), which is the fifth-fewest by an NFL team in a 16-game schedule. Oakland's two starting quarterbacks – Andrew Walter and Aaron Brooks – each threw only three touchdown passes all year; a seventh was thrown by backup Marques Tuiasosopo. Art Shell had re-hired offensive coordinator Tom Walsh who had been out of coaching and was working on a dude ranch. The offense struggled so bad that Walsh had to be demoted and former Chicago Bears offensive coordinator John Shoop who had been coaching tight ends was promoted but the offense remained a frustration to many fans.

Since losing to the Tampa Bay Buccaneers in Super Bowl XXXVII, the Raiders had a four-year aggregate record of 15–49 from 2003 to 2006, the worst in the NFL over that span. The only two games that the Raiders won were against the Pittsburgh Steelers and the Arizona Cardinals, who incidentally would play against each other in Super Bowl XLIII just 2 seasons later. The Raiders would beat both teams again in 2018.

According to Born Free Raider, the 2006 Raiders had the 6th largest offensive-defensive gap in the history, ranking 32nd in offense, but 18th in defense, behind the 2011 Patriots, 2002 and 2004 Chiefs, the 1992 Seahawks, and the 1991 Eagles.

== Offseason ==
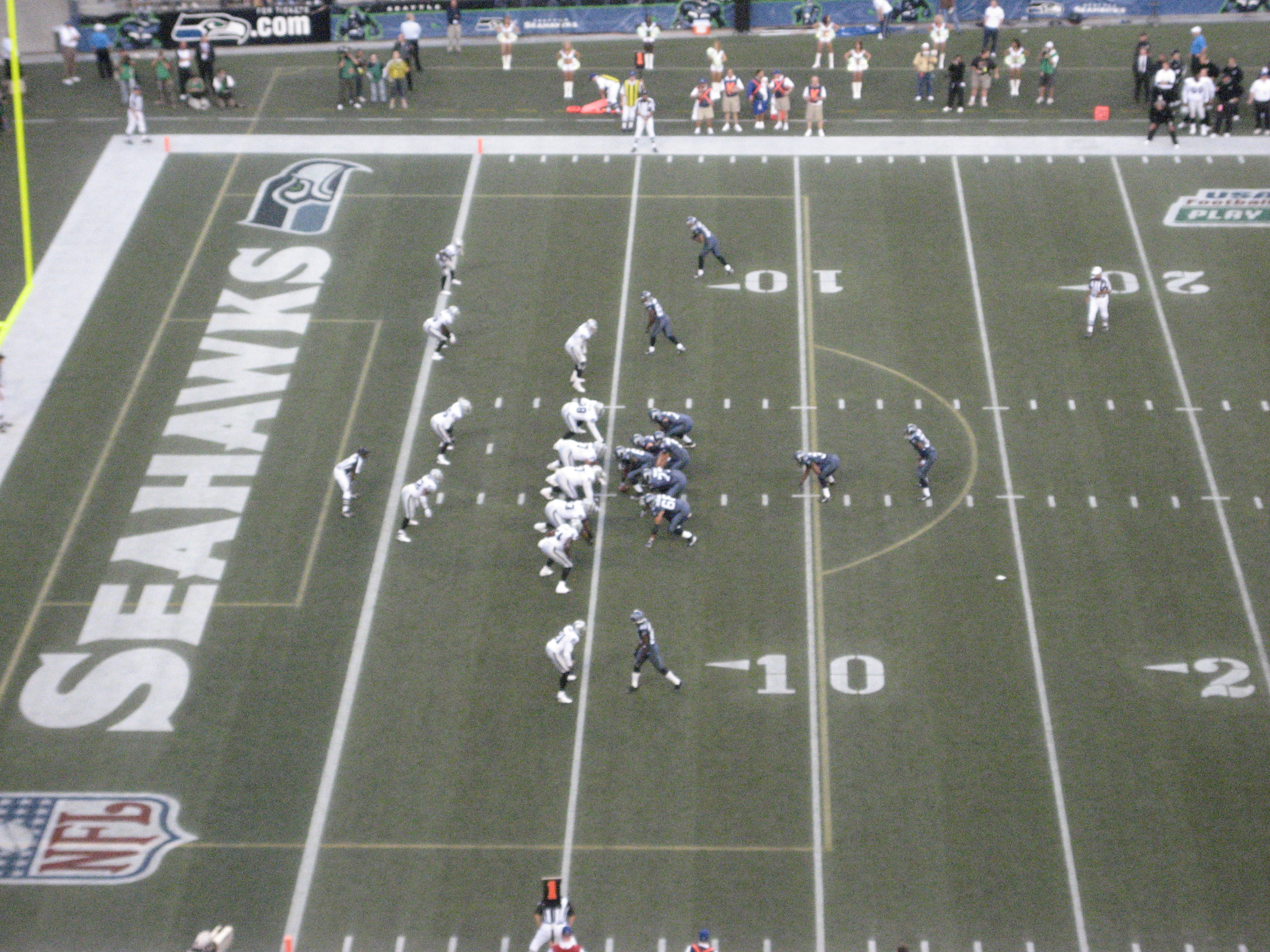
The Raiders visit the Seattle Seahawks during the 2006 preseason

Former Raiders head coach Art Shell, frequently regarded as one of the greatest offensive linemen in NFL history, and who won two Super Bowls and went to multiple Pro Bowls as a member of the Raiders, received an interview. Since firing Shell in 1994, Davis had said numerous times that he regretted the decision. Shell was renamed head coach on February 11, 2006.

Shell's staff for the 2006 season consisted of new offensive coordinator Tom Walsh (who was assistant head coach under Shell during his earlier tenure with the Raiders) and new offensive line coach Jackie Slater. Irv Eatman, formerly of the Kansas City Chiefs, assisted Slater in coaching the offensive line. Special teams coach Joe Avezzano, who took the position in 2004, was replaced; Rob Ryan returned to the team for his third season as defensive coordinator.

Quarterback Kerry Collins, who was 7–21 as a starter over two seasons, was released to create salary cap space. He was replaced by free agent Aaron Brooks, previously of the New Orleans Saints with Andrew Walter and Marques Tuiasosopo as the backups. The Raiders signed Toniu Fonoti but his contract he signed with Oakland was rescinded after he failed a physical.

One of the biggest losses of the offseason was cornerback Charles Woodson. First round draft pick of 2006 Michael Huff, linebacker Thomas Howard (2nd-round pick) and offensive lineman Paul McQuistan joined the team. Wide receiver Doug Gabriel was traded to the New England Patriots on September 2, 2006. They brought back Jeff George during the last week of the 2006 pre-season, but he did not make the team. Other notable additions for 2006 were cornerbacks Tyrone Poole and Duane Starks, undrafted free agent tight end John Madsen and defensive end Lance Johnstone who returned to the team. Marcellus Rivers and Rod Smart were signed before training camp but did not make the final 53-man roster.

== Roster ==
2006 Oakland Raiders roster
Quarterbacks (QB): 2 Aaron Brooks; 8 Marques Tuiasosopo; 16 Andrew Walter; Running backs (RB): 32 Zack Crockett FB; 20 Adimchinobe Echemandu; 25 Justin Fargas; 42 ReShard Lee; Wide receivers (WR): 88 James Adkisson; 13 Will Buchanon; 89 Ronald Curry; 80 Doug Gabriel; 19 Johnnie Morant; 18 Randy Moss; Tight ends (TE): 83 Courtney Anderson; 85 John Madsen; 46 Derek Miller; 86 Randal Williams	Offensive linemen (OL): 70 Brad Badger G/T; 67 Kevin Boothe G; 76 Robert Gallery T; 64 Jake Grove C; 71 Corey Hulsey G; 79 Paul McQuistan G; 61 Chris Morris C/LS; 65 Barry Sims G; 78 Chad Slaughter T; 66 Langston Walker T; Defensive linemen (DL): 91 Tyler Brayton DE; 56 Derrick Burgess DE; 77 Anttaj Hawthorne DT; 94 Kevin Huntley DE; 93 Tommy Kelly DT; 90 Terdell Sands DE/DT; 99 Warren Sapp DT	Linebackers (LB): 57 Ricky Brown OLB; 50 Isaiah Ekejiuba MLB; 53 Thomas Howard OLB; 52 Kirk Morrison MLB; 55 Robert Thomas OLB; 54 Sam Williams OLB; Defensive backs (DB): 21 Nnamdi Asomugha CB; 23 Chris Carr CB/KR/PR; 40 Jarrod Cooper FS; 31 Hiram Eugene FS; 36 Derrick Gibson SS; 24 Michael Huff SS; 38 Tyrone Poole CB; 26 Stanford Routt CB; 30 Stuart Schweigert FS; 22 Duane Starks CB; 27 Fabian Washington CB; Special teams (ST): 11 Sebastian Janikowski K; 9 Shane Lechler P	Practice squad: 4 Leo Bookman WR; 59 Jon Condo LS; 81 Tony Jackson TE; 92 Bryant McNeal DE; 63 Mark Wilson T; Reserve: -- Darnell Bing LB (IR); 82 Carlos Francis WR (IR); 28 DeJuan Green RB (IR); 96 Grant Irons LB (IR); 51 Lance Johnstone DE (IR); 34 LaMont Jordan RB (IR); 73 Michael Quarshie DT (IR); 84 Jerry Porter WR (IR); 62 Adam Treu C/LS (IR); 87 Alvis Whitted WR (IR); Rookies in italics 53 active, 10 reserve, 5 practice squad

== Schedule ==
Week	Date	Opponent	Result	Record	Venue	Attendance
1	September 11	San Diego Chargers	L 0–27	0–1	McAfee Coliseum	62,578
2	September 17	at Baltimore Ravens	L 6–28	0–2	M&T Bank Stadium	70,744
3	Bye					
4	October 1	Cleveland Browns	L 21–24	0–3	McAfee Coliseum	61,426
5	October 8	at San Francisco 49ers	L 20–34	0–4	Monster Park	68,368
6	October 15	at Denver Broncos	L 3–13	0–5	Invesco Field at Mile High	76,691
7	October 22	Arizona Cardinals	W 22–9	1–5	McAfee Coliseum	61,595
8	October 29	Pittsburgh Steelers	W 20–13	2–5	McAfee Coliseum	62,385
9	November 6	at Seattle Seahawks	L 0–16	2–6	Qwest Field	67,816
10	November 12	Denver Broncos	L 13–17	2–7	McAfee Coliseum	62,094
11	November 19	at Kansas City Chiefs	L 13–17	2–8	Arrowhead Stadium	78,097
12	November 26	at San Diego Chargers	L 14–21	2–9	Qualcomm Stadium	66,105
13	December 3	Houston Texans	L 14–23	2–10	McAfee Coliseum	46,276
14	December 10	at Cincinnati Bengals	L 10–27	2–11	Paul Brown Stadium	65,882
15	December 17	St. Louis Rams	L 0–20	2–12	McAfee Coliseum	50,164
16	December 23	Kansas City Chiefs	L 9–20	2–13	McAfee Coliseum	61,446
17	December 31	at New York Jets	L 3–23	2–14	Giants Stadium	78,039

== Standings ==
AFC West
	W	L	T	PCT	DIV	CONF	PF	PA	STK
^{(1)} San Diego Chargers	14	2	0	.875	5–1	10–2	492	303	W10
^{(6)} Kansas City Chiefs	9	7	0	.563	4–2	5–7	331	315	W2
Denver Broncos	9	7	0	.563	3–3	8–4	319	305	L1
Oakland Raiders	2	14	0	.125	0–6	1–11	168	332	L9

== Regular season ==
The Raiders played all three of their divisional opponents at least once during prime time, and faced former division rival Seattle Seahawks in a prime time game as well. They also had a chance of playing in up to two more prime time games by virtue of the NFL's newly implemented flexible scheduling system.

They made their debut on NBC Sunday Night Football in Denver against the division rival Broncos. They returned to Monday Night later in the season against the Seattle Seahawks where the Raiders played at Qwest Field for the first time. On Christmas Week, the Raiders made their debut on the NFL Network at home against the Kansas City Chiefs.

=== Week 1: vs. San Diego Chargers ===
	1	2	3	4	Total
Chargers	3	10	0	14	27
Raiders	0	0	0	0	0

at McAfee Coliseum, Oakland, California

The Raiders started the regular season with a 27–0 shut-out home loss at the hands of the San Diego Chargers on September 11, during the second game of a Monday Night Football doubleheader on opening weekend. The team was shut out at home for only the second time in the franchise's history, the first one being a 17–0 loss to the division rival Denver Broncos on October 4, 1981.

=== Week 2: at Baltimore Ravens ===
	1	2	3	4	Total
Raiders	0	3	0	3	6
Ravens	9	7	2	10	28

at M&T Bank Stadium, Baltimore, Maryland

The Raiders traveled to Baltimore, Maryland to take on the Ravens. Oakland could only muster six points, however, all of them coming from Kicker Sebastian Janikowski (34-yard field goal in the second quarter and a 51-yard field goal in the fourth quarter), while Baltimore maintained their lead throughout the game. With the loss, the Raiders fell to 0–2.

=== Week 4: vs. Cleveland Browns ===
	1	2	3	4	Total
Browns	0	10	14	0	24
Raiders	7	14	0	0	21

at McAfee Coliseum, Oakland, California

Not even their Week 3 Bye could help out Oakland. Despite jumping out to a 21–3 lead and going into halftime ahead 21–10, and despite a touchdown by linebacker Sam Williams and two interceptions by cornerback Nnamdi Asomugha, the Raiders failed to shut down the Browns' offense, allowing 14 third quarter points. In the days after the game, coach Art Shell said that Raider higher-ups responsible for deciding whether or not a challenge is worthwhile told him that one was not following a third and 16 play from the Cleveland Browns' 45-yard-line that went for fifteen yards in the fourth quarter. Shell said that after reviewing the telecast of the game, "I was miffed, because we should have challenged it." Following that, a fourth and 1 hand-off to LaMont Jordan was stopped in the backfield for a loss of two, resulting in a turnover on downs.

=== Week 5: at San Francisco 49ers ===
	1	2	3	4	Total
Raiders	3	10	0	7	20
49ers	7	0	14	13	34

at Candlestick Park, San Francisco, California

The Raiders traveled across the bay to Monster Park in San Francisco to take on the 49ers.

The 49ers got on the board first with an Alex Smith to Arnaz Battle touchdown pass midway through the first quarter. The Raiders responded with a 33-yard field goal by Sebastian Janikowski. Janikowski then converted a 36 yarder early in the second quarter. Randy Moss scored his 100th career touchdown reception on a 22-yard pass from Andrew Walter, as the Raiders went into halftime with a 13–7 lead.

The 49ers then went on to score 24 unanswered points in the second half, as Smith connected on touchdown passes with Battle once again, and Maurice Hicks in the third quarter. Joe Nedney converted a chip shot 19-yard field goal early in the fourth quarter. On the next Raiders play from scrimmage, Melvin Oliver recovered a fumble for a touchdown, as Walter tried to lateral a pass to LaMont Jordan, who let it hit the ground, and assumed it was an incomplete pass. Marques Tuiasosopo hit Courtney Anderson with a touchdown pass late in the game, but it was too little too late. Nedney completed the scoring with a 39-yard field goal.

=== Week 6: at Denver Broncos ===
	1	2	3	4	Total
Raiders	0	0	3	0	3
Broncos	7	6	0	0	13

at Invesco Field at Mile High, Denver, Colorado

The Raiders travelled to INVESCO Field at Mile High in Denver to face the division rival Broncos on Sunday Night Football.

An excellent assessment of the Raiders' futility thus far in the season was provided by a reader of ESPN.com's Bill Simmons. In Simmons' NFL Week 6 preview, "Dave from Washington" submitted: "The Raiders suck so bad that they are 15-point underdogs to a team that scores 12.2 points a game. This has to be a sports first."

For the third time in the season, Oakland failed to score a touchdown, falling to the Broncos in a 13–3 loss. Surprising Week 6 victories by the Tampa Bay Buccaneers and Tennessee Titans left the Raiders as the NFL's sole winless team.

=== Week 7: vs. Arizona Cardinals ===
	1	2	3	4	Total
Cardinals	0	3	3	3	9
Raiders	14	3	5	0	22

at McAfee Coliseum, Oakland, California

On October 22, 2006, the Raiders hosted the Arizona Cardinals in Oakland on the Fox Television Network.

In a game where former Raiders coach John Madden received his Hall of Fame ring in a pregame ceremony, the Raiders jumped out to an early 7-point lead after a Cardinal drive ended in a missed field goal. The long drive, capped by a ReShard Lee rush for a touchdown was their second drive of the game.

On another 1st Quarter Cardinal drive, Derrick Burgess tipped a Matt Leinart pass and the ball was intercepted by Terdell Sands. This set up a one play drive in which Andrew Walter tossed a 32-yard pass to Randy Moss for their second touchdown.

After the teams traded field goals in the 2nd quarter, the Raiders defense stiffened in the 3rd. Michael Huff, the player the Raiders took instead of Leinart in April's draft, tackled running back Marcel Shipp in the end zone for a safety. The safety was preceded by an incomplete pass and 2 consecutive sacks for losses by the Raiders defense.

Andrew Walter finished with 17 of 30 for 260 yards, 1 TD, 1 INT and left the game with a mild hamstring injury.

While containing the Cardinals to 9 points from field goals, the Raiders ended their 11-game losing streak dating back almost a year, to November 20, 2005, and finally got their first win of the season.

=== Week 8: vs. Pittsburgh Steelers ===
	1	2	3	4	Total
Steelers	0	6	0	7	13
Raiders	7	3	3	7	20

at McAfee Coliseum, Oakland, California

On October 29, 2006, the Raiders hosted the Pittsburgh Steelers in Oakland on CBS. The color commentator for the game was former Raiders quarterback Rich Gannon, with play-by-play announcer Kevin Harlan.

The game was all defense as the Raiders' and Steelers' offenses struggled to gain yardage. It wasn't until the 4th quarter when the Steelers fought to come back from a 7-point deficit and got their yardage total to over 300.

Steelers QB Ben Roethlisberger struggled to pass the ball, getting intercepted twice in the first quarter. Fabian Washington got his first career interception and Nnamdi Asomugha got his third, which he returned for a touchdown to give the Raiders a 7–0 lead. The Steelers put up 6 points on two field goals in the second quarter. The Raiders then moved downfield in the final two minutes of the first half. The drive seemed promising after Raiders QB Andrew Walter completed a 19-yard pass to Jerry Porter. It was Porter's first catch of the season in his first game of the season. However, the drive stalled and the Raiders settled for a field goal to end the half up 10–6.

The Raiders moved downfield to start the second half, with the help of two Steelers penalties. The drive also stalled and the Raiders settled for another field goal for a 13–6 lead. Raiders middle linebacker Kirk Morrison got his second interception of the season (and his career) later in the game.

The Raiders offense completely struggled to move the ball and had several three and outs, mainly due to penalties and dropped passes (notably by Randy Moss who got booed after his second dropped pass) and it looked like it would come back to haunt them as the Steelers moved down midway through the fourth quarter and it looked like they would surely tie the game. However, on third and goal, cornerback Chris Carr would intercept Roethlisberger's pass and return it 100 yards for a touchdown. It was the second longest interception return in Raiders history. This gave the Raiders a 20–6 lead. However, they couldn't hold it long, as the Steelers quickly moved downfield and scored the only offensive touchdown of the game, a 25-yard completion to Willie Parker.

Despite the Raiders' offensive problems, they were on pace to have their first game without a turnover. That changed when Steelers LB Joey Porter intercepted an Andrew Walter pass at midfield. The Steelers again moved to the red zone. However, the Raiders defense made an unbelievable effort and stopped the Steelers on four goal line situations giving the ball back to the Raiders offense with less than 2 minutes left. However a three-and-out gave the Steelers offense the ball back with 39 seconds left and a chance to tie the game. After a sack by Raiders DT Warren Sapp, Big Ben attempted a hail mary pass to Nate Washington. The pass was complete, but Nate was tackled at the 4-yard line, short of the end zone as time ran out.

Walter only threw 5-for-14 for 51 yards. His five sacks made the net yardage 17 yards. It was the Raiders lowest offensive yardage (98 yards) in history that they came out victorious. With the win, the Raiders won back-to-back games for the first time since 2005, which also occurred in Weeks 7 and 8. They are now 2–5 after starting the season 0–5.

The Raiders are tied third in interceptions (10), doubling last year's total of 5 (an NFL record low in a 16-game season). However, they are tied dead last in turnover ratio with −9. The defense is ranked #5 in the NFL. Contrast with the offense, which is dead last. The offense failed to score a TD in four of their seven games.

Interesting fact: It was the Steelers first visit to Oakland since December 1995. The Steelers defeated the Raiders 29–10. Coincidentally, the only touchdown the Raiders scored that game was also on an interception return.

The Raiders move to 9–8 against the Steelers in regular season matchups. The Raiders are also now 4–2 (Since 2001) against opponents that were in the Super Bowl the previous season. Both losses came last year when they lost to the New England Patriots and the Philadelphia Eagles (both on the road). In 2004, the Raiders defeated the Super Bowl runner up Carolina Panthers in Carolina, defeated the Patriots at home in 2002 and beat the New York Giants at Giants Stadium in 2001.

=== Week 9: at Seattle Seahawks ===
	1	2	3	4	Total
Raiders	0	0	0	0	0
Seahawks	10	3	0	3	16

at Qwest Field, Seattle, Washington

Hoping to continue building off of their two-game win streak, the Raiders flew to Qwest Field for a Monday Night showdown with the Seattle Seahawks. In the first quarter, Oakland's woes continued to haunt them as QB Seneca Wallace completed a 22-yard TD pass to WR Deion Branch and kicker Josh Brown kicked a 20-yard field goal. In the second quarter, Brown continued to make the Raiders visit terrible with a 25-yard field goal for the only score of the period. After a scoreless third quarter, Brown would put the game away with another 20-yard field goal.

This game marked the first time in Monday Night Football history that a team got shut out twice in one year. Also, QB Andrew Walter got sacked 9 times and Oakland's overall offense was just 185 yards.

=== Week 10: vs. Denver Broncos ===
	1	2	3	4	Total
Broncos	7	0	0	10	17
Raiders	7	6	0	0	13

at McAfee Coliseum, Oakland, California

Trying to rebound from their Monday Night road loss to the Seahawks, the Raiders went home for an AFC West rematch with the Denver Broncos. In the first quarter, the Raiders struck first. Following an interception by cornerback Nnamdi Asomugha, RB LaMont Jordan plunged in for a 1-yard TD run. The Broncos would respond with QB Jake Plummer completing a 39-yard TD pass to Javon Walker. In the second quarter, Oakland would regain the lead with kicker Sebastian Janikowski getting a 55-yard and a 20-yard field goal. However, after a scoreless third quarter, Denver would retake the lead and win with Plummer completing a 1-yard TD pass to FB Kyle Johnson and kicker Jason Elam getting a 24-yard field goal. Despite a strong defensive effort, including two interceptions from cornerback Fabian Washington, the Raiders lost the game and fell to 2–7.

=== Week 11: at Kansas City Chiefs ===
	1	2	3	4	Total
Raiders	3	10	0	0	13
Chiefs	7	0	3	7	17

at Arrowhead Stadium, Kansas City, Missouri

Trying to rebound from two-straight losses, the Raiders flew to Arrowhead Stadium for a fierce AFC West fight with the Kansas City Chiefs. For this game, QB Aaron Brooks fully recovered from his earlier injuries and returned to the starting lineup. In the first quarter, Chiefs RB Larry Johnson got a 5-yard TD run, while the Raiders responded with kicker Sebastian Janikowski getting a 41-yard field goal. In the second quarter, Oakland had the Kansas City on the run with Janikowski kicking a 36-yard field goal and Brooks completing a 2-yard TD pass to TE Courtney Anderson. In the third quarter, the Chiefs came within three points with kicker Lawrence Tynes getting a 37-yard field goal for the only score of the period. In the fourth quarter, Johnson delivered the death blow with a 1-yard TD run. With the loss, the Raiders fell to 2–8.

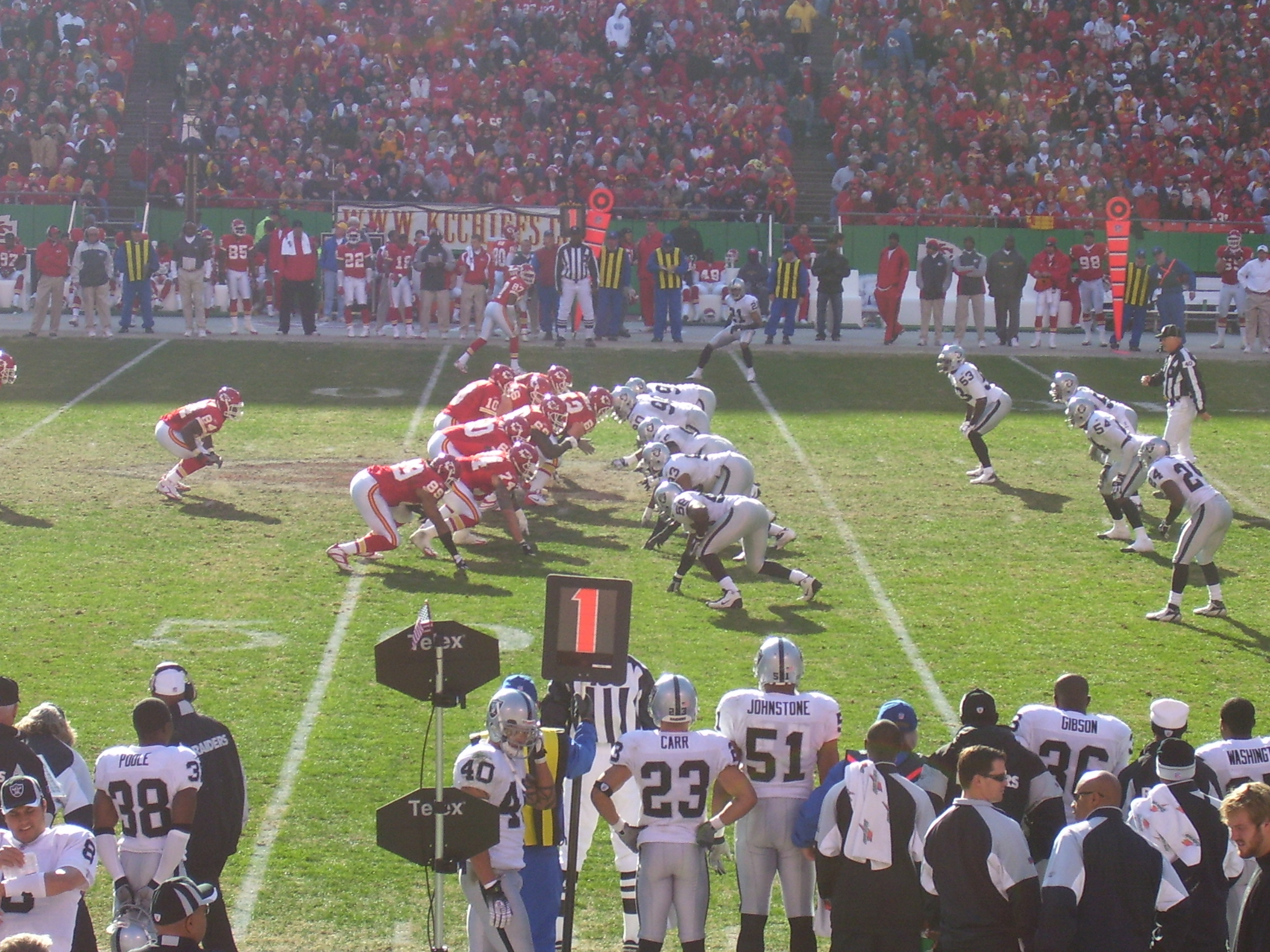
The game in week 11

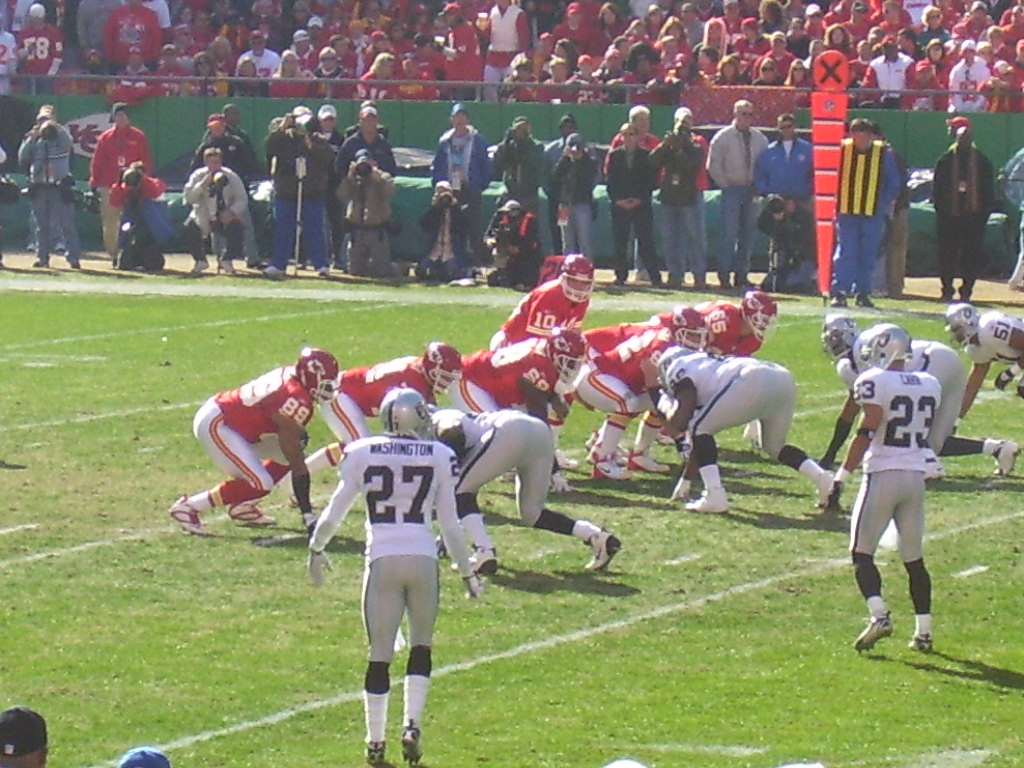
Kansas City on offense

=== Week 12: at San Diego Chargers ===
	1	2	3	4	Total
Raiders	0	7	7	0	14
Chargers	0	7	0	14	21

at Qualcomm Stadium, San Diego, California

Trying to end a three-game skid, the Raiders flew to Qualcomm Stadium for an AFC West rematch with the San Diego Chargers. After a scoreless first quarter, RB ReShard Lee helped the Raiders strike first with a 1-yard TD run. The Chargers would respond with RB LaDainian Tomlinson with a 4-yard TD run. In the third quarter, Oakland got the lead with QB Aaron Brooks completing a 2-yard TD pass to rookie WR John Madsen for the only score of the period. However, in the fourth quarter, San Diego took control for the win, as Tomlinson threw a successful 19-yard TD pass to TE Antonio Gates on an HB Option. Afterwards, Tomlinson would end the game with a 10-yard TD run. With the loss, the Raiders fell to 2–9.

=== Week 13: vs. Houston Texans ===
	1	2	3	4	Total
Texans	7	0	7	9	23
Raiders	0	14	0	0	14

at McAfee Coliseum, Oakland, California

Trying to end a four-game losing streak, the Raiders went home for a Week 13 fight with the Houston Texans Offensive Coordinator Tom Walsh had been demoted and John Shoop was promoted to help ignite the struggling offense. In the first quarter, Oakland trailed early with DB Demarcus Faggins returning a fumble 58 yards for a touchdown, along with the score of the period. In the second quarter, the Raiders climbed back into the game and into the lead with RB Justin Fargas' 3-yard TD run, along with MLB Kirk Morrison returning a fumble 35 yards for a touchdown. In the third quarter, Oakland's lead vanished with RB Wali Lundy's 3-yard TD run for the only score of the period. In the fourth quarter, the Texans wrapped up the game with kicker Kris Brown nailing a 42-yard, a 47-yard, and a 39-yard field goal. The Oakland Raiders secondary (which is ranked #1 in the NFL) held the Texans to −5 yards passing, yet the Raiders were unable to pull out the win. With their fifth-straight loss, the Raiders fell to 2–10.

=== Week 14: at Cincinnati Bengals ===
	1	2	3	4	Total
Raiders	0	3	0	7	10
Bengals	14	0	13	0	27

at Paul Brown Stadium, Cincinnati, Ohio

Trying to snap a five-game losing streak, the Raiders flew to Paul Brown Stadium for a Week 14 fight with the Cincinnati Bengals. On the third play of the game, QB Carson Palmer was intercepted by cornerback Nnamdi Asomugha, only for the Raiders to fumble the ball on the next play from scrimmage. In the first quarter, the Raiders trailed early as QB Carson Palmer completing an 8-yard TD pass to WR Chris Henry, while RB Rudi Johnson got a 1-yard TD run. In the second quarter, following another interception by Asomugha, Oakland managed to get on the board with kicker Sebastian Janikowski getting a 33-yard field goal for the only score of the period. In the third quarter, Cincinnati's dominance continued with Rudi getting a 6-yard TD run, while Palmer hooked up with WR T. J. Houshmandzadeh for a 20-yard TD strike, which was followed up with a missed PAT. In the fourth quarter, the only form of a comeback the Raiders could do was QB Aaron Brooks completing a 5-yard TD pass to WR Ronald Curry. With their sixth-straight loss, the Raiders fell to 2–11.

=== Week 15: vs. St. Louis Rams ===
	1	2	3	4	Total
Rams	0	6	7	7	20
Raiders	0	0	0	0	0

at McAfee Coliseum, Oakland, California

Trying to end a six-game losing streak, the Raiders went home for an interconference fight with the St. Louis Rams (who, just like the Raiders, used to play in Los Angeles, California). After a scoreless first quarter, Oakland's struggles continued as Rams' kicker Jeff Wilkins nailed a 24-yard and a 34-yard field goal. In the third quarter, the Raiders' problems continued with RB Stephen Jackson getting a 4-yard TD run for the only score of the period. In the fourth quarter, St. Louis wrapped up the game with Jackson getting a 19-yard TD run. With their seventh-straight loss, the Raiders fell to 2–12.

This marked the third time this season that the Raiders got shut out.

=== Week 16: vs. Kansas City Chiefs ===
	1	2	3	4	Total
Chiefs	10	7	0	3	20
Raiders	3	3	3	0	9

at McAfee Coliseum, Oakland, California

Trying to end a seven-game skid, the Raiders played their final home game of the season against the Kansas City Chiefs in an AFC West rematch on Saturday night. In the first quarter, Oakland struck first with kicker Sebastian Janikowski getting a 25-yard field goal. However, the Chiefs responded with QB Trent Green's 6-yard TD pass to WR Eddie Kennison, along with kicker Lawrence Tynes' 29-yard field goal. In the second quarter, the Raiders responded with Janikowski's 37-yard field goal. Unfortunately, K.C. RB Larry Johnson got a 1-yard TD run. In the third quarter, Oakland managed to get the only score of the period with Janikowski's 53-yard field goal. However, the Chiefs wrapped the game up in the fourth quarter with Tynes' 28-yard field goal. With their eighth-straight loss, the Raiders fell to 2–13. Also with the loss, they lost 13 games for the first time since 1961 and it even marked the first time in Raiders history that they lost eight consecutive games to one team (the Chiefs).

Some of causes to Oakland's loss came from five turnovers (two interceptions and three lost fumbles), continuous penalty problems (6 penalties for 45 yards), and a year-long lack of offense.

=== Week 17: at New York Jets ===
	1	2	3	4	Total
Raiders	0	3	0	0	3
Jets	7	3	3	10	23

at Giants Stadium, East Rutherford, New Jersey

Trying to end their disastrous season on a high note, the Raiders flew to The Meadowlands for a Week 17 fight with the New York Jets. In the first quarter, more of Oakland's lacklusterness flowered as Jets QB Chad Pennington completed a 1-yard TD pass to TE Chris Baker for the only score of the period. In the second quarter, the Raiders got their only score of the game with kicker Sebastian Janikowski nailing a 35-yard field goal. Afterwards, offensive struggles continued to haunt the Raiders as kicker Mike Nugent nailed a 35-yard field goal. Then, in the second half, New York wrapped up the game Nugent's 22-yard field goal in the third quarter, along with RB Leon Washington's 15-yard TD run and Nugent's 35-yard field goal. With the loss and the Lions win over the Cowboys, Oakland ended up at 2–14, along with the first pick in the 2007 NFL draft.
