= DeJuan =

DeJuan or Dejuan is a masculine given name of American origin, a combination of the element de and the Spanish name Juan. It is often found among African Americans. Notable people with the given name include:

- DeJuan Alfonzo (born 1977), American football player
- DeJuan Blair (born 1989), American basketball player
- DeJuan Collins (born 1976), American basketball player
- DeJuan Green (born 1980), American football player
- DeJuan Groce (born 1980), American football player
- DeJuan Jones (born 1997), American soccer player
- DeJuan Tribble (born 1985), American football player
- Suga Free (real name Dejuan Walker; born 1970), American rapper
- DeJuan Wheat (born 1973), American basketball player
- DeJuan Wright (born 1988), American basketball player

== See also ==
- Dajuan, a given name of similar origin
