= Ronald Curry =

American football player and coach (born 1979)

- Curry during his tenure with the Oakland Raiders

Denver Broncos
- Title: Wide receivers coach

Personal information
- Born: May 28, 1979 (age 47); Hampton, Virginia, U.S.
- Listed height: 6 ft 2 in (1.88 m)
- Listed weight: 210 lb (95 kg)

Career information
- Position: Wide receiver (No. 1, 89)
- High school: Hampton
- College: North Carolina (1998–2001)
- NFL draft: 2002: 7th round, 235th overall pick

Career history

Playing
- Oakland Raiders (2002–2008); Detroit Lions (2009)*; St. Louis Rams (2009)*
- * Offseason or practice squad member only

Coaching
- Mooresville Christian Academy (NC) (2010–2012) Head coach; San Francisco 49ers (2014–2015) Offensive assistant; New Orleans Saints (2016–2023); Offensive assistant (2016–2017); Wide receivers coach (2018–2020); Quarterbacks coach (2021); Quarterbacks coach & passing game coordinator (2022–2023); Buffalo Bills (2024–2025) Quarterbacks coach; Denver Broncos (2026–present) Wide receivers coach

Career NFL statistics
- Receptions: 193
- Receiving yards: 2,347
- Receiving touchdowns: 13
- Stats at Pro Football Reference

Ronald Antonio Curry (born May 28, 1979) is an American football coach and former wide receiver who is the wide receivers coach for the Denver Broncos of the National Football League (NFL). He has previously served as an assistant coach for the San Francisco 49ers, New Orleans Saints, and Buffalo Bills.

Curry played college football as a quarterback at North Carolina and was selected by the Oakland Raiders in the seventh round of the 2002 NFL draft. He played eight seasons in the NFL for the Raiders, Detroit Lions, and St. Louis Rams.

== Early life ==
Curry was born in Hampton, Virginia. At Hampton High School in Hampton, Virginia, Curry was an All-American in basketball and football and was awarded the Dial Award for the national high-school scholar-athlete of the year in 1997. He won the McDonald's Slam Dunk contest and was MVP of the McDonald's All-American Game in 1998. By most reports, his high school football coach favored Curry attending the University of Virginia and focusing on football, while his high school basketball coach favored the University of North Carolina to develop Curry into a prospect for the NBA. He verbally committed to play both basketball and football to Virginia before signing instead with rival North Carolina. This made him a very unpopular figure among Virginia fans, who referred to him by such terms as "Benedict Curry", "Benedict Ronald", or "WHN" (an abbreviation of "What's his name?"). Curry was voted the "Sports Jerk of the Year" in the Tank McNamara comic strip. Curry's cousin Almondo "Muffin" Curry, a cornerback, later decided to attend Virginia.

Ronald Curry broke several Virginia high school football records while attending Hampton High School. He is considered one of the greatest Virginia high school athletes ever, leading his school to three consecutive state titles in football from 1995 to 1997 and one in basketball in 1998. The 1996 Hampton High School football team went 14–0, outscoring opponents 768–83 including a 51–0 victory over a previously unbeaten Patrick Henry team in the state championship, and is widely considered to be the best team in Virginia history; the 1997 team also went 14–0 and posted similar numbers. Curry also excelled at cornerback and kick returner in addition to his quarterbacking duties. Michael Vick was in the same district as Curry in high school and was overshadowed by the accomplishments of Curry's team. While Vick was also a highly touted prospect, Curry was almost universally rated higher in recruiting rankings. In an interview, Vick said "I felt pressure to compete against Ronald Curry." One college football recruiting analyst says Curry was the best offensive prospect he saw in 23 years. Bobby Bowden said he was best high school quarterback he had ever seen.

== College career ==
At North Carolina, Curry set many records including most career passing yards and most career total yards. He was twice named the most valuable player of post-season bowl games, doing so at the 1998 Las Vegas Bowl and the 2001 Peach Bowl. He also played basketball for two years along with Carolina Panthers defensive end Julius Peppers. Curry went through multiple football coaching changes. He played under 3 different offensive coordinators. In his senior season, his position coach was Gary Tranquill, who had joined the Tar Heels in 2001 after leaving the Virginia staff when Al Groh became coach.

== Professional career ==
Pre-draft measurables
Height	Weight	Arm length	Hand span	40-yard dash	10-yard split	20-yard split	20-yard shuttle	Three-cone drill	Vertical jump	Broad jump	Wonderlic
6 ft 1 7/8 in (1.88 m)	220 lb (100 kg)	31 1/2 in (0.80 m)	9 3/4 in (0.25 m)	4.63 s	1.62 s	2.68 s	4.11 s	7.06 s	35.0 in (0.89 m)	9 ft 7 in (2.92 m)	22
All values from NFL Combine

=== Oakland Raiders ===
Curry was selected by the Oakland Raiders in the seventh round of the 2002 NFL draft with the 235th overall pick as a quarterback.

Curry made his professional regular season debut on November 3, 2002, in a 23–20 loss to cross-town rival San Francisco 49ers. In that game, Curry lost one fumble. During the preseason, Curry played in three games and lost three fumbles. He played all 16 games of the 2003 season, including two starts, and made five receptions for 31 yards.

In 2004, as the number 3 receiver behind Jerry Porter, he hauled in 50 receptions for 679 yards before injuring his Achilles tendon. Before his injury Curry's highlights included 10 receptions in a game against the Colts, a Raiders' season high. He recorded his first 100-yard receiving game with 110 yards on six catches in Week 11 at Denver, then followed that up with a nine-catch, 141-yard performance the next week against Kansas City. He also won the Levitra NFL Play of the Week for his leaping, twisting, one-handed grab in the back of the end zone at Denver in a snowstorm.

After an extensive off-season rehabilitation program to repair his torn tendon, Curry unfortunately re-injured the same tendon in week 2 of the 2005 season against the Chiefs and was lost for the rest of the year. Curry returned in 2006 and proved to be one of the few bright spots on an abysmal 2–14 last-place Raiders team. He led the team in receiving yards and receptions and had one touchdown while only starting a few games.

During the 2006 offseason Curry signed a new 5-year $20 million contract. In 2007 as a starter in Oakland, he opened the regular season with a 10 catch, 133-yard and one touchdown performance.

Curry again underwent surgery on his foot in May 2008 and missed the team's first mandatory minicamp on June 3–5.

In the season opener on Monday Night Football (September 8, 2008), Curry would catch a 4-yard touchdown reception in the team's lopsided loss to the Denver Broncos. After a loss to the New Orleans Saints on October 12, Curry was benched in favor of rookie receiver Chaz Schilens. However, after an injury to Schilens, Curry started against the Miami Dolphins on November 16. Curry on that day caught 6 passes for 73 yards and the following week against the Denver Broncos lined up in the Wildcat formation in the shotgun stance; however, no receiver was open and Curry ran it out of bounds for a gain of one yard.

Curry was released by the Raiders on February 18, 2009.

=== Detroit Lions ===
Curry was signed by the Detroit Lions on April 16, 2009.

=== St. Louis Rams ===
On July 22, 2009, Curry was acquired by the St. Louis Rams from the Lions in a trade for defensive tackle Orien Harris. The Rams released Curry on September 5.

== NFL career statistics ==
Legend
**Bold**	Career high

Year	Team	Games		Receiving					
Year	Team	GP	GS	Tgt	Rec	Yds	Avg	Lng	TD
2002	OAK	1	0	0	0	0	0.0	0	0
2003	OAK	**16**	2	10	5	31	6.2	16	0
2004	OAK	12	3	70	50	679	**13.6**	**63**	**6**
2005	OAK	2	0	2	2	12	6.0	8	0
2006	OAK	**16**	4	89	**62**	**727**	11.7	39	1
2007	OAK	**16**	**13**	**97**	55	717	13.0	49	4
2008	OAK	13	10	48	19	181	9.5	16	2
Career		76	32	316	193	2,347	12.2	63	13

== Coaching career ==
=== Mooresville Christian Academy ===
Curry began his coaching career at Mooresville Christian Academy in Mooresville, NC, as the athletic director and head football coach from 2010 to 2012.

=== San Francisco 49ers ===
From 2014 to 2015, Curry was an offensive assistant with the San Francisco 49ers, until he was let go after the 2015 season due to a coaching overhaul.

=== New Orleans Saints ===
On February 3, 2016, Curry was hired by the New Orleans Saints as an offensive assistant under head coach Sean Payton.

In 2018, Curry was promoted to wide receivers coach.

On March 4, 2021, Curry was promoted to quarterbacks coach, replacing Joe Lombardi, who departed to become the offensive coordinator for the Los Angeles Chargers. On February 23, 2022, Curry was promoted to the title of passing game coordinator.

=== Buffalo Bills ===
On February 7, 2024, Curry was named as quarterbacks coach for the Buffalo Bills under head coach Sean McDermott. He was not retained by new head coach Joe Brady for the 2026 season.

=== Denver Broncos ===
On February 18, 2026, it was announced that Curry would be hired as the wide receivers coach for the Denver Broncos.

== Personal life ==
Curry was raised by his grandparents until Mattie Curry, his grandmother, became too ill to parent him full-time. Ron and Almondo Curry were then taken in by Lillian Crawford, the great-grandmother of their very good friend Kenneth Crawford. Ronald and Almondo remained very close to their grandmother until her death in October 2000.

Curry then met a fellow UNC student, junior Stacie Jones, and in March 2001 they became engaged. They married not long after he moved to Oakland after being drafted by the Raiders. In July 2004, they had their first child, a daughter, Raley Camille Curry. Their second daughter, Emery Mattie, followed 4 years later. On February 23, 2010, they had their third child (and first son), Carter Wallace Curry.
