= Dajuan =

Dajuan or DaJuan is a given name. Notable people with the name include:

- DaJuan Coleman (born 1992), American basketball player
- Dajuan Graf (born 1992), American basketball player
- Dajuan Harris Jr. (born 1983), American basketball player
- DaJuan Morgan (born 1985), American football player
- DaJuan Summers (born 1988), American basketball player
- Dajuan Wagner (born 1983), American basketball player
- D. J. Wagner (born 2005), American basketball player

== See also ==
- DeJuan
