= Dylan Gandy =

American football player (born 1982)

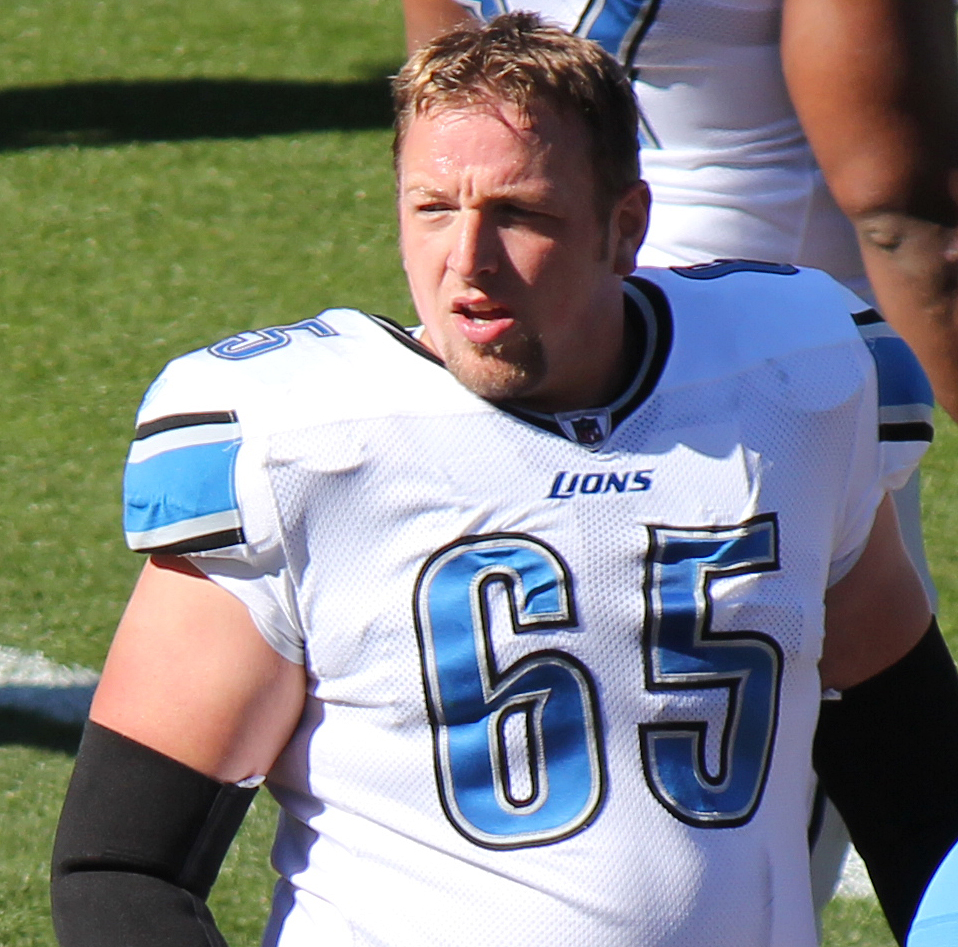
- Gandy with the Detroit Lions in 2011

No. 57, 65
- Positions: Center, guard

Personal information
- Born: March 8, 1982 (age 44); Harlingen, Texas, U.S.
- Listed height: 6 ft 3 in (1.91 m)
- Listed weight: 295 lb (134 kg)

Career information
- High school: Pflugerville (Pflugerville, Texas)
- College: Texas Tech
- NFL draft: 2005: 4th round, 129th overall pick

Career history
- Indianapolis Colts (2005–2007); Denver Broncos (2008); Oakland Raiders (2008); Detroit Lions (2009–2013); Chicago Bears (2014)*
- * Offseason or practice squad member only

Awards and highlights
- Super Bowl champion (XLI); Second-team All-Big 12 (2004)

Career NFL statistics
- Games played: 120
- Games started: 19
- Fumble recoveries: 1
- Stats at Pro Football Reference

Dylan Colter Gandy (born March 8, 1982) is an American former professional football player who was a center in the National Football League (NFL). He was selected by the Indianapolis Colts in the fourth round of the 2005 NFL draft. He played college football for the Texas Tech Red Raiders.

Gandy won a Super Bowl with the Colts in Super Bowl XLI against the Chicago Bears. He was also a member of the Denver Broncos, Oakland Raiders, Detroit Lions and Chicago Bears.

== Early life ==
Dylan Gandy attended Pflugerville High School in Pflugerville, Texas, where he lettered in football and track & field. In football, he was a two-way lineman, a first-team All-District pick, a first-team All-Central Texas pick, and also the team's long snapper.

== College career ==
Gandy attended Texas Tech University. After redshirting as a true freshman, he started three games the following season. He finished his sophomore year as an All-Big 12 Academic first-teamer, and made the second-team the following year as a junior. Although he played mostly guard and tackle his first three seasons, he switched to center his senior year, where he started 12 games. He was selected to the All-Big 12 honorable mention team by the coaches in the conference.

== Professional career ==
=== Indianapolis Colts ===
Gandy was selected by the Indianapolis Colts in the fourth round (129th overall) of the 2005 NFL draft. He was released by the Colts on May 2, 2008.

=== Denver Broncos ===
On May 16, 2008, Gandy signed with the Denver Broncos. He was released on September 9, 2008. The Broncos re-signed Gandy on September 25 after center Tom Nalen was placed on injured reserve. He was released again on October 7 when the team re-signed tight end Chad Mustard.

=== Oakland Raiders ===
Gandy was signed by the Oakland Raiders on November 26, 2008, when wide receiver Javon Walker was placed on injured reserve. He was waived on December 4 to make room for practice squad wide receiver Johnathan Holland.

=== Detroit Lions ===
Gandy signed with the Detroit Lions on April 6, 2009. He played with the team until 2013.

=== Chicago Bears ===
The Chicago Bears signed Gandy to a one-year contract on July 25, 2014. The Bears released Gandy on August 23, 2014.
