= DeLawrence Grant =

American football player (born 1979)

No. 95, 99, 59
- Position: Defensive end/Linebacker

Personal information
- Born: November 18, 1979 (age 46); Compton, California, U.S.
- Listed height: 6 ft 3 in (1.91 m)
- Listed weight: 280 lb (127 kg)

Career information
- College: Oregon State
- NFL draft: 2001: 3rd round, 27th overall pick

Career history
- Oakland Raiders (2001–2005)

Awards and highlights
- First-team All-Pac-10 (2000)

Career NFL statistics
- Tackles: 67
- Sacks: 7
- Passes defended: 1
- Stats at Pro Football Reference

DeLawrence Grant Jr. (born November 18, 1979) is an American former professional football player who was a linebacker for college football for the Oregon State Beavers and was selected by the Oakland Raiders in the third round of the 2001 NFL draft.

== College career ==
DeLawrence Grant was a defensive end for Oregon State University.

== Professional career ==
Grant was selected by the Raiders in the third round of the 2001 NFL draft and has played five years for them. Grant began his career as a defensive end before being converted to linebacker.

He played sparingly as a rookie in 2001, before starting at left end for most of the Raiders' Super Bowl season in 2002. That season Delawrence was ranked top 10.

That offseason, he was released by the Raiders for salary cap reasons, but was later re-signed. Due to an injury, he played only half the season in 2005, missing most of the middle portion.

One of the stranger aspects of Grant's star-crossed Raiders career is his continual switch in uniform number. He started out as No. 95, then switched to No. 99 when a more experienced player, Sam Adams, was signed and was issued the jersey. He then switched to No. 59 (the reverse of his prior No. 95) after moving to linebacker, since numbers in the 50s were thought of as linebackers' numbers.

== NFL career statistics ==
Legend
**Bold**	Career high

=== Regular season ===
Year	Team	Games		Tackles					Interceptions					Fumbles			
Year	Team	GP	GS	Cmb	Solo	Ast	Sck	TFL	Int	Yds	TD	Lng	PD	FF	FR	Yds	TD
2001	OAK	2	0	0	0	0	0.0	0	0	0	0	0	0	0	0	0	0
2002	OAK	**16**	**14**	**26**	**21**	5	**3.0**	**6**	0	0	0	0	0	0	**1**	0	0
2003	OAK	13	4	18	8	**10**	1.0	2	0	0	0	0	0	0	0	0	0
2004	OAK	9	9	20	14	6	2.0	3	0	0	0	0	**1**	0	0	0	0
2005	OAK	9	0	3	2	1	1.0	0	0	0	0	0	0	0	0	0	0
		49	27	67	45	22	7.0	11	0	0	0	0	1	0	1	0	0

=== Playoffs ===
Year	Team	Games		Tackles					Interceptions					Fumbles			
Year	Team	GP	GS	Cmb	Solo	Ast	Sck	TFL	Int	Yds	TD	Lng	PD	FF	FR	Yds	TD
2002	OAK	**3**	**3**	**4**	**2**	**2**	**0.5**	0	0	0	0	0	0	0	0	0	0
		3	3	4	2	2	0.5	0	0	0	0	0	0	0	0	0	0
