= Stuart Schweigert =

American football player and coach (born 1981)

No. 20, 30, 39
- Position: Safety

Personal information
- Born: June 21, 1981 (age 45); Saginaw, Michigan, U.S.
- Listed height: 6 ft 2 in (1.88 m)
- Listed weight: 210 lb (95 kg)

Career information
- High school: Heritage (Saginaw)
- College: Purdue (2000–2003)
- NFL draft: 2004: 3rd round, 67th overall pick

Career history

Playing
- Oakland Raiders (2004–2007); Washington Redskins (2008)*; New York Giants (2008)*; Detroit Lions (2008); Omaha Nighthawks (2010–2012)
- * Offseason or practice squad member only

Coaching
- Saginaw Sting (Head coach) (2015); Saginaw Valley State (Tight ends) (2015)

Operations
- Saginaw Sting – Director of player development (2011); Saginaw Sting – Co-owner (2012–2015); Continental Indoor Football League – Co-owner (2013–2014)

Awards and highlights
- UFL Defensive Player of the Year (2011); Second-team All-American (2003); Big Ten Freshman of the Year (2000); 2× First-team All-Big Ten (2001, 2003); Second-team All-Big Ten (2002); Career interception record at Purdue (30)

Career NFL statistics
- Total tackles: 325
- Forced fumbles: 2
- Fumble recoveries: 4
- Pass deflections: 21
- Interceptions: 4
- Stats at Pro Football Reference

Stuart Eric Schweigert (born June 21, 1981) is an American former professional football player who was a safety in the National Football League (NFL). He played college football for the Purdue Boilermakers and played in the National Football League (NFL) for five seasons, from 2004 to 2008. He was selected in the third round of the 2004 NFL draft by the Oakland Raiders.

== Early life ==
Schweigert played quarterback and safety for Heritage High School (Saginaw, Michigan) in Saginaw, Michigan. As a senior, he was ranked as the No. 9 defensive back and No. 78 player overall in the nation by Prep Football Report. He was ranked as the No. 18 best skill athlete by SuperPrep and a four-star recruit (out of five) by Rivals.com. He amassed 1,502 rushing yards with 22 touchdowns as an option quarterback, threw for 500 yards with four touchdowns, and recorded 50 tackles with three interceptions and seven pass breakups on defense as a senior. He was timed in 4.4 seconds in the 40-yard dash, and won the Michigan state champion in the 100 meters with a time of 10.45 defeating Charles Rogers. He placed third in the 200 meters in 21.6.

== College career ==
While at Purdue, Schweigert started his entire career; winning a Big Ten Championship his freshman year. He played in 4 bowl games; the 2001 Rose Bowl, the 2001 and 2002 Sun Bowls and the 2003 Capital One Bowl. He collected 17 career interceptions, besting the previous school career record mark of 11 set by Rod Woodson, who also played for the Oakland Raiders. He was selected as the Big Ten Freshman of the Year following the 2000 season, was voted 1st Team All-Big Ten twice and 2nd Team All-Big Ten twice. Entering his Senior season (2003), he was tabbed as a Playboy All-American, he was also selected to be the All-Big Ten Academic 1st Team. He finished 9th all-time in total tackles (360) and 11th in solo tackles (226). In his final game at Ross–Ade Stadium he had two interceptions, including a game-clinching pick in a 27–14 victory over Iowa. Following the 2003 Capital One Bowl, he played in the 2004 Senior Bowl; helping the North team to a 17–0 victory.

== Professional career ==
Pre-draft measurables
Height	Weight	Arm length	Hand span	40-yard dash	10-yard split	20-yard split	20-yard shuttle	Three-cone drill	Vertical jump	Broad jump	Bench press
6 ft 2 in (1.88 m)	218 lb (99 kg)	31 3/4 in (0.81 m)	9 1/2 in (0.24 m)	4.45 s	1.57 s	2.62 s	3.89 s	6.68 s	38 in (0.97 m)	10 ft 4 in (3.15 m)	18 reps
Arm and hand spans from Pro Day, all other values from NFL Combine.

=== Oakland Raiders ===
Schweigert was selected in the third round (67th overall) of the 2004 NFL draft by the Oakland Raiders. In his rookie year, he put up 52 tackles (43 solo, nine assisted) and three pass deflections. The following year, he improved to 87 tackles (70 solo, 17 assisted), seven pass deflections and two interceptions (against the Miami Dolphins and the Kansas City Chiefs).

In 2006, he continued to improve by amassing 107 tackles (86 solo, 21 assisted) and four pass deflections. In 2007, Schweigert was injured and only recorded 69 tackles (56 solo, 13 assisted), four pass deflections and two interceptions.

On May 21, 2008, Schweigert was officially released by the Raiders.

=== Washington Redskins ===
On June 2, 2008, Schweigert was signed by the Washington Redskins. He was cut by the Redskins on August 4, 2008, due to his poor performance throughout preseason.

=== New York Giants ===
On August 11, 2008, Schweigert signed with the New York Giants. He was released by the Giants on August 30 during final cuts.

=== Detroit Lions ===
Schweigert was signed by the Detroit Lions on November 19, 2008, after the team waived safety LaMarcus Hicks. He played six games with the team but was eventually cut by the Lions on September 5, 2009, before the regular season.

=== Omaha Nighthawks ===
In May 2010, Schweigert signed with the Omaha Nighthawks of the United Football League. Schweigert played with the Nighthawks until their collapse midway through the 2012 season. During the 2011 season, Schweigert played well enough to earn the UFL's Defensive Player of the Year Award.

== NFL career statistics ==
Legend
**Bold**	Career high

Year	Team	Games		Tackles					Interceptions					Fumbles			
Year	Team	GP	GS	Cmb	Solo	Ast	Sck	TFL	Int	Yds	TD	Lng	PD	FF	FR	Yds	TD
2004	OAK	**16**	3	52	43	9	0.0	0	0	0	0	0	3	0	0	0	0
2005	OAK	**16**	13	89	72	17	0.0	0	**2**	**35**	0	**33**	**9**	**2**	**3**	**3**	0
2006	OAK	**16**	**16**	**107**	**86**	**21**	0.0	0	0	0	0	0	4	0	1	0	0
2007	OAK	15	10	68	56	12	0.0	**1**	**2**	10	0	10	4	0	0	0	0
2008	DET	6	0	9	9	0	0.0	0	0	0	0	0	1	0	0	0	0
		69	42	325	266	59	0.0	1	4	45	0	33	21	2	4	3	0

== Coaching career ==
On April 7, 2015, Schweigert was named the head coach of the Saginaw Sting, a franchise that he and two others own.

On August 13, 2015, Schweigert joined the Saginaw Valley State University coaching staff as an offensive assistant helping work with tight ends, along with responsibilities with special teams and running the scout team defense. On September 18, 2015, Schweigert was relieved of his duties with the team after an DUI arrest.

== Personal life ==
In 2011, Schweigert was the Director of Player Development for the Saginaw Sting. Later in the year, he and two other businessmen joined up to buy the franchise, and they now play in the Continental Indoor Football League. The Sting went undefeated in 2012, winning the 2012 CIFL Championship Game by a score of 35–7 over the Dayton Silverbacks. In July 2012, Rob Licht, Jim O'Brien and Schweigert, purchased the CIFL from Jeff Spiteleri. Schweigert and the other new owners of the league look to help current teams brand their product better, as well as look to expand the league, but their primary goal is to have competitive franchises.
