= Thomas Howard (American football) =

American football player (1983–2013)

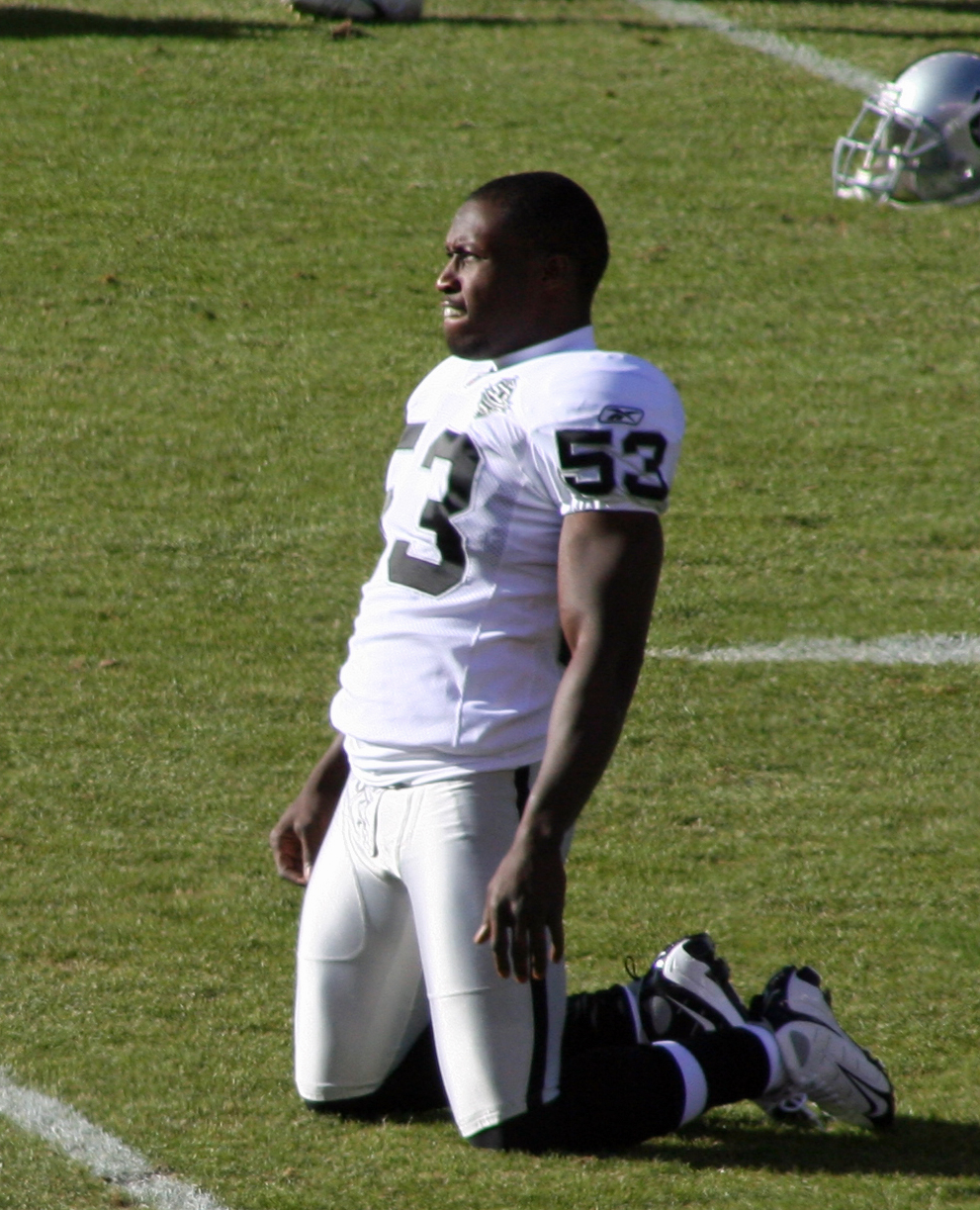
- Howard in 2009

No. 51, 53
- Position: Linebacker

Personal information
- Born: July 14, 1983; Lubbock, Texas, U.S.
- Died: November 18, 2013 (aged 30); Oakland, California, U.S.
- Listed height: 6 ft 3 in (1.91 m)
- Listed weight: 245 lb (111 kg)

Career information
- High school: Estacado (Lubbock, Texas)
- College: UTEP (2002–2005)
- NFL draft: 2006: 2nd round, 38th overall pick

Career history
- Oakland Raiders (2006–2010); Cincinnati Bengals (2011–2012); Atlanta Falcons (2013)

Career NFL statistics
- Total tackles: 494
- Sacks: 6
- Forced fumbles: 6
- Fumble recoveries: 2
- Interceptions: 7
- Defensive touchdowns: 2
- Stats at Pro Football Reference

Thomas Arquis Howard (July 14, 1983 – November 18, 2013) was an American professional football linebacker in the National Football League (NFL). He was selected by the Oakland Raiders in the second round of the 2006 NFL draft. He also played for the Cincinnati Bengals and Atlanta Falcons. He played college football for the University of Texas at El Paso.

== College career ==
Thomas A. Howard began his college career as a walk-on at the University of Texas at El Paso and was then redshirted. He had a solid freshman season, being named to Sporting News All-WAC Freshman team. He played in 11 games and made 4 starts at weakside linebacker. The following season, he played in 13 games and started 10 of them. He had a great junior season being named Second Team All-WAC and helping lead his team to their first bowl game since 2001. He had a mediocre senior season after being named pre-season defensive player of the year in the state of Texas.

== Professional career ==
Pre-draft measurables
Height	Weight	Arm length	Hand span	40-yard dash	10-yard split	20-yard split	20-yard shuttle	Three-cone drill	Vertical jump	Broad jump	Bench press
6 ft 3 1/4 in (1.91 m)	239 lb (108 kg)	32 1/2 in (0.83 m)	10 1/4 in (0.26 m)	4.44 s	1.58 s	2.62 s	4.28 s	6.96 s	39.0 in (0.99 m)	10 ft 4 in (3.15 m)	21 reps
All values from NFL Combine

=== Oakland Raiders ===
Howard recorded 110 tackles, 88 solo tackles, and 1 pass deflection in 2006.

Howard's second season started off with an interception in each of his first 4 games, 2 of them which were returned for touchdowns. Since then he has also recorded a quarterback sack and 8 passes defensed. In only his second NFL season, Howard led the NFL in linebacker interceptions with 6 for 172 yards and 2 touchdowns. At the end of 2007, Howard had 95 tackles, 77 solo, 11 pass deflections, 6 interceptions, 1 sack, and 2 touchdowns.

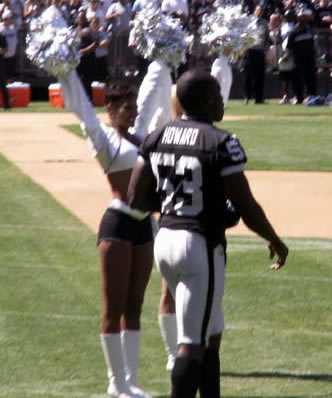
Thomas Howard

In 2008, Howard recorded his first career forced fumble during a week 2 victory against the division rival Kansas City Chiefs. He recorded a second during a week 16 victory against the Houston Texans. At the end of the season, Thomas Howard had 97 tackles, 80 solo, 5 pass deflections, 1 interception, 1 sack, and 2 forced fumbles.

In 2009, while tallying a career low 79 tackles (72 of which were solo), Howard still came away with a career-high 2 sacks. He finished the season with 79 tackles, 72 solo, 6 pass deflections, 2 sacks, and 1 forced fumble.

In 2010, The Raiders waived him after 12 games.

=== Cincinnati Bengals ===
In the 2011 offseason, Howard signed a 2-year deal with the Bengals worth $6.5 million.

On September 13, 2012, Joe Reedy of The Cincinnati Enquirer reported that the Bengals had placed Howard on injured reserve after tearing his ACL in practice.

=== Atlanta Falcons ===
Howard was signed by the Atlanta Falcons on October 22, 2013, and subsequently released on November 12, 2013, having appeared in two games.

=== NFL statistics ===
Year	Team	GP	COMB	TOTAL	AST	SACK	FF	FR	FR YDS	INT	IR YDS	AVG IR	LNG	TD	PD
2006	OAK	16	110	88	22	0.0	0	0	0	0	0	0	0	0	1
2007	OAK	16	95	77	18	1.0	0	0	0	6	172	29	66	2	11
2008	OAK	16	97	80	17	1.0	2	0	0	1	-3	-3	-3	0	5
2009	OAK	16	79	72	7	2.0	1	1	0	0	0	0	0	0	6
2010	OAK	12	9	7	2	0.0	1	0	0	0	0	0	0	0	1
2011	CIN	16	99	64	35	1.0	2	0	0	0	0	0	0	0	4
2012	CIN	1	3	3	0	1.0	0	0	0	0	0	0	0	0	1
Career		93	492	391	101	6.0	6	1	0	7	169	24	66	2	29

== Personal life ==
=== Family ===
Howard was born and raised in Lubbock, Texas and attended Lubbock Estacado High School. His father, Thomas Howard Sr., also played in the NFL as a linebacker. Howard's cousin is singer Terry Ellis, best known as a member of En Vogue.

=== Philanthropy ===
In January 2010, Howard donated money to the Bay Area After-School All-Stars. The Bay Area After-School All-Stars is a program that provides free after school programming for underserved youth. The program currently serves 26 schools in San Jose and is looking to expand to more schools in the future. Students attend the program for four hours each day after school, doing their homework, creating art, and playing sports.

Howard launched the Thomas Howard Foundation in September 2009 to build partnerships and programs to enhance students' academic and athletic goals. The Foundation benefits youth who seek to excel in both education and organized sports activities. The signature scholarships and programs of the Thomas Howard Foundation include: The Annual Walk-On Scholarship; YFL Football Uniforms Scholarship Fund; the Are You Smarter than a 4th Grader program for school curriculum enhancement; and supporting the After-School All-Stars, providing programs that include academic support, enrichment opportunities, and health/fitness activities. Howard returned to his college town of El Paso for special programs honoring Walk-On athletes.

=== Death ===
On November 18, 2013, Howard was one of two people killed in an Oakland, California high-speed crash on Interstate Highway 880.
