= Jonathan Holland (American football) =

American gridiron football player (born 1985)

No. 10, 23, 84
- Position: Wide receiver

Personal information
- Born: February 18, 1985 (age 41); Monroe, Louisiana, U.S.
- Listed height: 6 ft 0 in (1.83 m)
- Listed weight: 191 lb (87 kg)

Career information
- High school: Mangham (LA)
- College: Louisiana Tech
- NFL draft: 2007: 7th round, 254th overall pick

Career history
- Oakland Raiders (2007–2010); Edmonton Eskimos (2011)*; Virginia Destroyers (2012)
- * Offseason or practice squad member only

Career NFL statistics
- Return yards: 550
- Stats at Pro Football Reference

Jonathan Holland (born February 18, 1985) is an American former professional football player who was a wide receiver in the National Football League (NFL). He was selected by the Oakland Raiders in the seventh round of the 2007 NFL draft. He played college football for the Louisiana Tech Bulldogs.

== Early life ==
Holland attended Mangham High School in Mangham, Louisiana, where he lettered in football and track. In track, he placed first at the Louisiana Class 1A State Track Meet on the 400 meter dash with a time of 50.41 seconds.

== Professional career ==
=== Oakland Raiders ===
Holland was selected by the Oakland Raiders in the seventh round (254th overall) of the 2007 NFL draft. He was placed on injured reserve on July 24, 2007, ending his rookie season.

Holland was promoted to the active roster on December 4, 2008, after the team waived offensive lineman Dylan Gandy. Holland was waived/injured by the Raiders on August 9, 2010.

=== Edmonton Eskimos ===
Holland was signed by the Edmonton Eskimos of the Canadian Football League (CFL) in 2011, but was released prior to the regular season.

=== Virginia Destroyers ===
Holland was a member of the Virginia Destroyers in 2012.

== Coaching career ==
In 2019, he joined the staff at Episcopal High School (Bellaire, Texas) as both a defensive back's and wide receiver's coach. He coached in two 4A Southwest Preparatory Conference championship games (2022, 2023), winning a title in 2023.

In the summer of 2024, he took a job at St. Thomas High School (Houston, TX) as the offensive coordinator and assistant track and field coach. In his first year at St. Thomas, the Eagles were crowned TAPPS Track & Field State Champions (2024-2025). In his second year as St. Thomas' Offensive Coordinator, the Eagles were crowned TAPPS District Champions (2025). Holland has won a total of 3 State Championships (TAPPS) as an assistant coach for the Eagles Track and Field program.
