= Jerry Porter (American football) =

American football player (born 1978)

- Porter during his tenure with the Oakland Raiders

No. 84, 80
- Position: Wide receiver

Personal information
- Born: July 14, 1978 (age 48); Washington, D.C., U.S.
- Listed height: 6 ft 2 in (1.88 m)
- Listed weight: 220 lb (100 kg)

Career information
- High school: Coolidge (Washington, D.C.)
- College: West Virginia
- NFL draft: 2000: 2nd round, 47th overall pick

Career history
- Oakland Raiders (2000–2007); Jacksonville Jaguars (2008)

Career NFL statistics
- Receptions: 295
- Receiving yards: 4,120
- Receiving touchdowns: 31
- Stats at Pro Football Reference

Jerry Porter (born July 14, 1978) is an American former professional football player who was a wide receiver in the National Football League (NFL). He played college football for the West Virginia Mountaineers and was selected by the Oakland Raiders in the second round of the 2000 NFL draft. Porter also played for the Jacksonville Jaguars.

== Early life ==
Porter attended Coolidge High School in Washington D.C., and was a star in football, basketball, baseball, and track. In football, he was a Blue Chip All-American selection and also won All-State honors. He was often called "Superman" by the West Virginia scouts, because he could play quarterback, wide receiver, fullback, halfback, defensive end, and defensive back during three varsity seasons. He was also reported to possess a 40-inch vertical jump, ability to throw a football 80 yards with one hand and 50 yards with his other while on his knees, and run a 4.4 40 yard dash.

== College career ==
Porter came into West Virginia as a freshman, and coach Don Nehlen was uncertain of his final position. Porter was an All-Big East selection as an all-purpose back.

As a freshman, he saw action as a free safety in the first five games and filled in as the emergency quarterback against Rutgers, then finished the second half of the season as a wide receiver. For the season he recorded 28 tackles and an interception that was returned 68 yards for a touchdown. He also blocked a kick and recorded 311 yards and four touchdowns receiving as well. As a sophomore, he caught 13 passes for 280 yards and three touchdowns. As a junior, Porter started every game at free-safety, recording five interceptions.

== Professional career ==
Pre-draft measurables
Height	Weight
6 ft 2 1/4 in (1.89 m)	221 lb (100 kg)
Values from NFL Combine

=== Oakland Raiders ===
Porter was drafted in 2000 during the second round by the Oakland Raiders. For three seasons, from 2001 to 2003, Porter was looked to as a third receiver behind veterans Tim Brown and Jerry Rice. Porter's best season came in 2004, when he recorded 998 yards and 9 touchdowns from quarterback Rich Gannon.

During the 2004 season, Porter was basically the starting receiver in front of Rice. Porter recorded a career-high 998 yards off of 64 receptions and 9 touchdowns for the season, the best of his career. However, the Raiders finished the season 5–11 and veteran quarterback Rich Gannon retired after suffering a serious neck injury.

With Jerry Rice's retirement after the 2004 season, it looked as if Porter would be new quarterback Kerry Collins' primary receiver. But just before the NFL draft, the Raiders traded linebacker Napoleon Harris and draft picks for all-star receiver Randy Moss. With Moss on team, Porter would have the role as the secondary receiver. Even though he was not the primary receiver, he still managed to record a 942-yard, 5 touchdown season (2nd best of his career).

Entering the 2006 season, Porter publicly voiced his dissatisfaction with newly hired head coach Art Shell, and during training camp, demanded to be traded. Porter's conflict with Shell occurred very early in training camp, when Shell announced that champagne would no longer be allowed at the training facility. In addition to his public complaints, he reportedly parked in owner Al Davis's personal parking spot. As a result of his attitude, Coach Shell deactivated him "until further notice".

During his suspension, Porter was reportedly seen "laughing and pumping his fist" on the sidelines when teammate Aaron Brooks was sacked for the 7th time by the San Diego Chargers. He later denied these allegations, saying that he was not paying attention to the game and was interacting with fans in the seats.

Having still not played in a game in 2006, Porter was officially suspended/inactivated without pay for four games (the maximum allowable) by Coach Shell on October 15 for "conduct detrimental to the team" after he made disparaging and disrespectful remarks during a regular team practice. When the suspension was announced the NFL Players Association filed a grievance on Porter's behalf, and the Raiders reduced the suspension to two games on the 25th and he was allowed to return to practice. He dressed for and played in his first game of 2006 on October 29 – a Raiders home win over the Pittsburgh Steelers – during which he recorded one catch for 19 yards.

With Moss traded to the New England Patriots and Art Shell fired, Porter became the primary receiver on the Raiders in 2007.

=== Jacksonville Jaguars ===
On February 29, 2008, Porter was signed by the Jacksonville Jaguars to a six-year contract worth $30 million. The contract contained $10 million in guaranteed money. In May, he underwent surgery on his hamstring. He missed the rest of training camp and that preseason, and should have been back for the season opener against the Tennessee Titans. However, he did not play until the fourth game of the season in a 30–27 win over the Houston Texans, when he had a reception for 6 yards. He recorded no stats for the following three games, before totaling two catches for 38 yards in a loss to the Cincinnati Bengals in week 9. He finished the season with 11 receptions for 181 yards and a touchdown in 10 games. On February 11, 2009, Porter was cut by the Jaguars.

=== Final seasons ===
Porter remained unsigned throughout the 2009 season. He then tried out for the Washington Redskins in 2010 but was not signed to a contract or invited to any training camps.

On February 15, 2011, the CFL's Montreal Alouettes signed Porter to a two-year contract. However, Porter tore his Achilles tendon in training camp, requiring season-ending surgery. He was subsequently released.

== NFL career statistics ==
Year	Team	GP	Receiving						Fumbles	
Year	Team	GP	Rec	Yds	Avg	Lng	TD	FD	Fum	Lost
2000	OAK	12	1	6	6.0	6	0	0	0	0
2001	OAK	15	19	220	11.6	21	0	14	0	0
2002	OAK	16	51	688	13.5	36	9	36	0	0
2003	OAK	10	28	361	12.9	35	1	21	1	1
2004	OAK	16	64	998	15.6	52	9	47	2	2
2005	OAK	16	76	942	12.4	49	5	45	1	0
2006	OAK	4	1	19	19.0	19	0	1	0	0
2007	OAK	16	44	705	16.0	59	6	29	0	0
2008	JAX	10	11	181	16.5	33	1	8	0	0
Career		115	295	4,120	14.0	59	31	201	4	3
