= John Bowie (American football) =

American gridiron football player (born 1984)

No. 35, 37
- Position: Cornerback

Personal information
- Born: May 11, 1984 (age 42); Columbus, Ohio, U.S.
- Listed height: 5 ft 11 in (1.80 m)
- Listed weight: 190 lb (86 kg)

Career information
- High school: Northland (Columbus)
- College: Cincinnati
- NFL draft: 2007: 4th round, 110th overall pick

Career history
- Oakland Raiders (2007–2009); Cleveland Browns (2010)*; Hartford Colonials (2010); Cincinnati Bengals (2011)*; Hamilton Tiger-Cats (2013)*
- * Offseason or practice squad member only

Career NFL statistics
- Total tackles: 2
- Stats at Pro Football Reference

John Bowie (born May 11, 1984) is an American former professional football player who was a cornerback in the National Football League (NFL). He was selected by the Oakland Raiders in the fourth round of the 2007 NFL draft. He played college football for the Cincinnati Bearcats.

Bowie was also a member of the Cleveland Browns, Hartford Colonials, Cincinnati Bengals and Hamilton Tiger-Cats.

== Early life ==
Bowie played high school football at Northland High School.

== Professional career ==
=== Pre-draft ===
Pre-draft measurables
| Height | Weight | 40-yard dash | 10-yard split | 20-yard split | 20-yard shuttle | Three-cone drill | Vertical jump | Broad jump | Bench press |
|---|---|---|---|---|---|---|---|---|---|
| 5 ft 10 7/8 in (1.80 m) | 188 lb (85 kg) | 4.37 s | 1.46 s | 2.50 s | 4.11 s | 6.79 s | 40.0 in (1.02 m) | 10 ft 6 in (3.20 m) | 10 reps |
All values from Pro Day

=== Oakland Raiders ===
Bowie was selected in the fourth round by the Oakland Raiders with the pick the Raiders acquired by trading wide receiver Randy Moss to the New England Patriots. Bowie was placed on injured reserve with a knee injury for the 2008 season on August 25, 2008.

On September 30, 2009, Bowie was waived from the Raiders and subsequently placed on injured reserve. He was released from injured reserve with an injury settlement on November 24.

=== Cleveland Browns ===
On February 8, 2010, Bowie was signed to a future contract by the Cleveland Browns. He was waived on June 17, 2010. He was re-signed on August 7, 2010. The Browns waived him on August 31.

=== Hartford Colonials ===
Bowie was signed by the Hartford Colonials of the United Football League on September 3, 2010.

=== Cincinnati Bengals ===
Bowie was signed by the Cincinnati Bengals practice squad on November 16, 2011.

=== Hamilton Tiger-Cats ===
Signed with the Hamilton Tiger-Cats of the Canadian Football League on April 11, 2013. Bowie was released by the club on April 23, 2013 (only 12 days after signing with them).
