= Clayton Lopez =

American football coach (born 1970)

Personal information
- Born: May 26, 1970 (age 56); Los Angeles, California, U.S.

Career information
- College: Nevada

Career history
- Nevada (1995–1996) Graduate assistant; Nevada (1997–1998) Running backs coach & recruiting coordinator; Seattle Seahawks (1999–2001) Defensive assistant & quality control coach; Seattle Seahawks (2002–2003) Assistant secondary coach; Oakland Raiders (2004–2005) Defensive backs coach; Detroit Lions (2006–2007) Defensive backs coach; Detroit Lions (2008) Assistant secondary coach; St. Louis Rams (2009–2011) Defensive backs / cornerbacks coach; Oakland Raiders (2012–2013) Defensive backs coach; Seattle Dragons (2020) Defensive coordinator

Clayton Lopez (born May 6, 1970) is an American football coach. He previously worked as the defensive backs coach for the St. Louis Rams and Oakland Raiders of the National Football League (NFL). He played defensive back at University of Nevada from 1991 to 1994.

On May 2, 2019, head coach Jim Zorn announced Lopez would be the defensive coordinator for the Seattle Dragons when the XFL began play in 2020. He served as the defensive coordinator until the league folded Midway through its first season.
