= Carlos Francis =

American football player (born 1981)

No. 10
- Position: Wide receiver

Personal information
- Born: January 3, 1981 (age 45); Fort Worth, Texas, U.S.
- Listed height: 5 ft 9 in (1.75 m)
- Listed weight: 200 lb (91 kg)

Career information
- High school: Southwest (TX)
- College: Texas Tech
- NFL draft: 2004: 4th round, 99th overall pick

Career history
- Oakland Raiders (2004–2006)

Career NFL statistics
- Games played: 5
- Return yards: 259
- Stats at Pro Football Reference

Carlos Francis (born January 3, 1981) is an American former professional football player who played wide receiver for the Oakland Raiders. At Texas Tech, he started in 38 of 49 contests he played in and hauled in 216 passes for 3,031 yards (14.0 avg) and 21 touchdowns. He was selected by the Raiders in the 2004 NFL draft. Francis was released in 2007. He now works for Texas Baptists as the Director of Young Adult Ministries.

Francis attended Southwest High School in Fort Worth, Texas and was a letterman in football and track.

Francis now coaches football, track, and basketball at The Oakridge School in Arlington, Texas.

== Track and field ==
=== Personal bests ===
Event	Time (seconds)	Venue	Date
60 meters	6.75	Ames, Iowa	February 25, 2000
100 meters	10.27	Lubbock, Texas	April 21, 2000
200 meters	21.30	College Station, Texas	March 18, 2000
