= James Adkisson =

American football player (born 1980)

No. 88
- Position: Tight end

Personal information
- Born: January 11, 1980 (age 46); St. Louis, Missouri, U.S.
- Listed height: 6 ft 5 in (1.96 m)
- Listed weight: 235 lb (107 kg)

Career information
- High school: Breckenridge Hills (MO) Ritenour
- College: South Carolina
- NFL draft: 2003: undrafted

Career history
- Cincinnati Bengals (2003)*; Oakland Raiders (2003–2006); → Cologne Centurions (2005); Kansas City Chiefs (2007)*; Green Bay Packers (2007)*
- * Offseason or practice squad member only

Career NFL statistics
- Receptions: 1
- Receiving yards: 9
- Stats at Pro Football Reference

James Adkisson (born January 11, 1980) is an American former professional football player who was a tight end in the National Football League (NFL). He played college football for the South Carolina Gamecocks. He spent the 2007 NFL season on the practice squads of the Kansas City Chiefs and Green Bay Packers, having been cut by the Oakland Raiders. In 2006, Adkisson played in two games for the Raiders and had one catch for nine yards.
