= Corey Hulsey =

American football player (born 1977)

No. 71
- Position: Guard

Personal information
- Born: July 26, 1977 (age 49); Gainesville, Georgia, U.S.
- Listed height: 6 ft 7 in (2.01 m)
- Listed weight: 325 lb (147 kg)

Career information
- High school: North Hall High School (GA) North Hall
- College: Clemson
- NFL draft: 1999: undrafted

Career history
- Buffalo Bills (1999–2001); Amsterdam Admirals (2001); Oakland Raiders (2003–2006); Detroit Lions (2008)*
- * Offseason or practice squad member only

Awards and highlights
- Second-team All-ACC (1998)
- Stats at Pro Football Reference

Corey Spear Hulsey (born July 26, 1977) is an American former professional football player who was a guard in the National Football League (NFL). He played college football for the Clemson Tigers and played in the NFL for the Buffalo Bills in 2001 and for the Oakland Raiders from 2003 to 2006.

He was signed by the Bills as an undrafted free agent in 1999. After the 2008 preseason, he was waived by the Lions during final cuts on August 30, 2008.
