= DeJuan Green =

American football player (born 1980)

No. 28
- Position: Running back

Personal information
- Born: May 13, 1980 (age 46); Jacksonville, Florida, U.S.

Career information
- College: South Florida
- NFL draft: 2004: undrafted

Career history
- Oakland Raiders (2004–2006); Hamburg Sea Devils (2006)

DeJuan Green (born May 13, 1980) is an American former professional football player who played three seasons for the Oakland Raiders, from 2004 to 2006. Green was born in Jacksonville, Florida on May 13, 1980.

== College career ==
He played running back for the University of South Florida.

== Professional career ==
He was signed as an undrafted free agent by the Oakland Raiders on April 29, 2004, after the 2004 NFL draft.

On September 4, 2005, he was signed to the Oakland Raiders' practice squad.

On January 27, 2006, he was assigned to the Hamburg Sea Devils of NFL Europe.

On August 29, 2006, he was placed on injured reserve.
