= 2010 Oakland Raiders season =

51st season in franchise history

- Owner: Al Davis
- General manager: Al Davis
- Head coach: Tom Cable
- Home stadium: Oakland–Alameda County Coliseum

Results
- Record: 8–8
- Division place: 3rd AFC West
- Playoffs: Did not qualify
- All-Pros: CB Nnamdi Asomugha (1st team); P Shane Lechler (1st team); S Michael Huff (2nd team)
- Pro Bowlers: CB Nnamdi Asomugha; P Shane Lechler; DT Richard Seymour; TE Zach Miller

The 2010 season was the Oakland Raiders' 41st in the National Football League (NFL), their 51st overall, and their second and final full season under head coach Tom Cable. It also marked the last full season under the ownership of Al Davis, who died in October 2011. The Raiders had improved from a five-win season, their first since 2002, and achieved their first non-losing season since losing Super Bowl XXXVII on January 26, 2003. However, the team missed the playoffs for the eighth consecutive season. The Raiders picked 8th in the 2010 NFL draft. There were no blacked-out home games after the early part of the season, and the team won all six divisional matches, including a then-franchise-record 59 points in Denver. The Raiders became the first team in NFL history to go undefeated in their division and still not make the playoffs.

The season was notable not only because the Raiders swept their division, but every victory came against a rival, both divisional and geographically. The Raiders recorded home victories against the Seattle Seahawks, their former division foes from 1977 to 2001, and the St. Louis Rams, whom the Raiders used to have a rivalry with during their time in Los Angeles from 1982 to 1994.

== Offseason ==
=== Draft ===
After finishing the 2009 season with a record of 5–11, the Raiders got the 8th overall pick in the 2010 NFL draft. They had an additional third round pick acquired in a trade with the New England Patriots for defensive end Derrick Burgess. Their sixth-round pick was traded to the Carolina Panthers as part of a deal that gave the Raiders a seventh-round pick in the 2009 NFL draft.

2010 Oakland Raiders draft
Round	Pick	Player	Position	College	Notes
1	8	Rolando McClain	LB	Alabama	
2	44	Lamarr Houston	DT	Texas	
3	69	Jared Veldheer	OT	Hillsdale	
4	106	Bruce Campbell	OT	Maryland	
5	108	Jacoby Ford	WR	Clemson	
5	138	Walter McFadden	CB	Auburn	Pick from NE
6	190	Travis Goethel	LB	Arizona State	Pick from NE
7	215	Jeremy Ware	DB	Michigan State	
7	251	Stevie Brown	DB	Michigan	Compensatory
Made roster † Pro Football Hall of Fame * Made at least one Pro Bowl during career

== Staff ==
Oakland Raiders 2010 staff
Front office: Principal owner/general manager – Al Davis; Chief executive – Amy Trask; Senior executive – John Herrera; Pro player personnel – Keith Rowen; Salary cap administrator – Tom Delaney; Director of college scouting – Jon Kingdon; Head coaches: Head coach – Tom Cable; Offensive coaches: Offensive coordinator – Hue Jackson; Passing game coordinator – Ted Tollner; Quarterbacks – Paul Hackett; Running backs – Kelly Skipper; Wide receivers – Sanjay Lal; Tight ends – Adam Henry; Offensive line – Jim Michalczik; Assistant offensive line – Chris Morgan; Offensive assistant – Eric Sanders	Defensive coaches: Defensive coordinator – John Marshall; Defensive line – Mike Waufle; Linebackers – Mike Haluchak; Defensive backs – Lionel Washington; Defensive backs – Kevin Ross; Assistant coach on defense – Greg Biekert; Defensive assistant – Mike Clark; Special teams coaches: Special teams coordinator – John Fassel; Special teams assistant – Craig Dickenson; Strength and conditioning: Strength and conditioning – Brad Roll

== Final roster ==
2010 Oakland Raiders roster
Quarterbacks (QB): 7 Kyle Boller; 8 Jason Campbell; 13 J. T. O'Sullivan; Running backs (RB): 32 Michael Bennett; 29 Michael Bush; 25 Rock Cartwright; 20 Darren McFadden; 45 Marcel Reece FB; Wide receivers (WR): 12 Jacoby Ford KR; 85 Darrius Heyward-Bey; 15 Johnnie Lee Higgins; 89 Nick Miller PR; 18 Louis Murphy; 81 Chaz Schilens; Tight ends (TE): 80 Zach Miller; 83 Brandon Myers	Offensive linemen (OL): 69 Khalif Barnes T; 74 Bruce Campbell G; 66 Cooper Carlisle G; 76 Robert Gallery G; 75 Mario Henderson T; 60 Daniel Loper G; 64 Samson Satele C; 68 Jared Veldheer T; 70 Langston Walker T; Defensive linemen (DL): 90 Desmond Bryant DT; 79 John Henderson DT; 99 Lamarr Houston DE; 93 Tommy Kelly DT; 94 Jarvis Moss DE; 92 Richard Seymour DT; 77 Matt Shaughnessy DE	Linebackers (LB): 57 Ricky Brown MLB; 58 Bruce Davis OLB; 50 Travis Goethel MLB; 52 Quentin Groves OLB; 53 Thomas Howard OLB; 55 Rolando McClain MLB; 54 Sam Williams OLB; 96 Kamerion Wimbley OLB; Defensive backs (DB): 21 Nnamdi Asomugha CB; 33 Tyvon Branch SS; 27 Stevie Brown FS; 31 Hiram Eugene FS; 24 Michael Huff FS; 37 Chris Johnson CB; 22 Walter McFadden CB; 34 Mike Mitchell SS; 26 Stanford Routt CB; 23 Jeremy Ware CB; Special teams (ST): 59 Jon Condo LS; 11 Sebastian Janikowski K; 9 Shane Lechler P	Practice squad: 84 Damola Adeniji WR; 10 Shaun Bodiford WR; 88 Kevin Brock TE; 97 David Howard DT; 65 Alex Parsons G; 28 Joe Porter CB; 56 Quentin Scott LB (IR); 41 Manase Tonga FB; Reserve: 3 Charlie Frye QB (IR); 5 Bruce Gradkowski QB (IR); 91 Trevor Scott DE (IR); Rookies in italics 53 active, 4 reserve, 7 practice squad

== Schedule ==
=== Preseason ===
Week	Date	Opponent	Result	Record	Venue	NFL.com recap
1	August 12	at Dallas Cowboys	W 17–9	1–0	Cowboys Stadium	Recap
2	August 21	at Chicago Bears	W 32–17	2–0	Soldier Field	Recap
3	August 28	San Francisco 49ers	L 24–28	2–1	Oakland–Alameda County Coliseum	Recap
4	September 2	Seattle Seahawks	W 27–24	3–1	Oakland–Alameda County Coliseum	Recap

=== Regular season ===
Week	Date	Opponent	Result	Record	Venue	NFL.com recap
1	September 12	at Tennessee Titans	L 13–38	0–1	LP Field	Recap
2	September 19	St. Louis Rams	W 16–14	1–1	Oakland–Alameda County Coliseum	Recap
3	September 26	at Arizona Cardinals	L 23–24	1–2	University of Phoenix Stadium	Recap
4	October 3	Houston Texans	L 24–31	1–3	Oakland–Alameda County Coliseum	Recap
5	October 10	San Diego Chargers	W 35–27	2–3	Oakland–Alameda County Coliseum	Recap
6	October 17	at San Francisco 49ers	L 9–17	2–4	Candlestick Park	Recap
7	October 24	at Denver Broncos	W 59–14	3–4	INVESCO Field at Mile High	Recap
8	October 31	Seattle Seahawks	W 33–3	4–4	Oakland–Alameda County Coliseum	Recap
9	November 7	Kansas City Chiefs	W 23–20 (OT)	5–4	Oakland–Alameda County Coliseum	Recap
10	Bye					
11	November 21	at Pittsburgh Steelers	L 3–35	5–5	Heinz Field	Recap
12	November 28	Miami Dolphins	L 17–33	5–6	Oakland–Alameda County Coliseum	Recap
13	December 5	at San Diego Chargers	W 28–13	6–6	Qualcomm Stadium	Recap
14	December 12	at Jacksonville Jaguars	L 31–38	6–7	EverBank Field	Recap
15	December 19	Denver Broncos	W 39–23	7–7	Oakland–Alameda County Coliseum	Recap
16	December 26	Indianapolis Colts	L 26–31	7–8	Oakland–Alameda County Coliseum	Recap
17	January 2	at Kansas City Chiefs	W 31–10	8–8	Arrowhead Stadium	Recap

== Standings ==
AFC West
	W	L	T	PCT	DIV	CONF	PF	PA	STK
^{(4)} Kansas City Chiefs	10	6	0	.625	2–4	6–6	366	326	L1
San Diego Chargers	9	7	0	.563	3–3	7–5	441	322	W1
Oakland Raiders	8	8	0	.500	6–0	6–6	410	371	W1
Denver Broncos	4	12	0	.250	1–5	3–9	344	471	L1

== Preseason results ==
Preseason Week 1 – at Dallas Cowboys

Quarter	1	2	3	4	Total
Raiders	0	0	0	17	17
Cowboys	3	0	3	3	9

at Cowboys Stadium, Arlington, Texas

- Date: August 12
- Game weather: Played indoors, retractable roof closed
- Game attendance: 72,282
- Recap

Game information

First Quarter

- Dal- D.Buehler 42 yard Field Goal (12 plays, 45 yards; 6:35)

Second Quarter

- No scoring plays

Third Quarter

- Dal - D.Buehler 27 yard Field Goal (9 plays, 69 yards; 4:46)

Fourth Quarter

- Dal - D.Buehler 28 yard Field Goal (4 plays, 1 yard; 2:30)
- Oak - N.Miller 4 yard pass from K.Boller (S.Waters kick) (13 plays, 80 yards; 5:43)
- Oak - S.Janikowski 28 yard Field Goal (7 plays, 54 yards; 2:04)
- Oak- J.Boyd 48 yard interception return (S.Janikowski kick)

Game leaders

- Passing: K. Boller (OAK) – 12/21 148 yards, 1 TD, 0 INT
- Rushing: M. Bennett (OAK) – 12 ATT 68 yards, 0 TD
- Receiving: S. Hurd (DAL) – 4 REC 57 yards, 0 TD
- Scoring Leader: D. Buehler (DAL) – 9 PTS

'Preseason Week 2 – at Chicago Bears

Quarter	1	2	3	4	Total
Raiders	10	3	14	5	32
Bears	6	8	0	3	17

at Soldier Field, Chicago

- Date: August 21
- Game weather: 82 °F (28 °C), Partly cloudy
- Game attendance: 60,207
- Recap

== Regular season results ==
=== Week 1: at Tennessee Titans ===
Week 1: Oakland Raiders at Tennessee Titans – Game summary

Quarter	1	2	3	4	Total
Raiders	3	3	0	7	13
Titans	10	14	7	7	38

at LP Field, Nashville, Tennessee

- Date: September 12
- Game time: 12:00 p.m. CDT/10:00 a.m. PDT
- Game weather: 77 °F (25 °C) (Sunny)
- Game attendance: 69,143
- Referee: Bill Leavy
- TV announcers (CBS): Ian Eagle and Dan Fouts
- Recap

Game information

First quarter

- OAK – Sebastian Janikowski 34 yard field goal, Raiders 3–0, Drive: 9 plays, 18 yards, 4:36.
- TEN – Nate Washington 56 yard pass from Vince Young (Rob Bironas kick), Titans 7–3, Drive: 3 plays, 74 yards, 1:38.
- TEN – Rob Bironas 43 yard field goal, Titans 10–3, Drive: 4 plays, −2 yards, 1:27.

Second quarter

- TEN – Javon Ringer 15 yard run (Rob Bironas kick), Titans 17–3, Drive: 8 plays, 61 yards, 3:49.
- TEN – Chris Johnson 76 yard run (Rob Bironas kick), Titans 24–3, Drive: 1 plays, 76 yards, 0:13.
- OAK – Sebastian Janikowski 30 yard field goal, Titans 24–6, Drive: 8 plays, 63 yards, 1:27.

Third quarter

- TEN – Chris Johnson 4 yard run (Rob Bironas kick), Titans 31–6, Drive: 10 plays, 57 yards, 5:10.

Fourth quarter

- TEN – Bo Scaife 1 yard pass from Vince Young (Rob Bironas kick), Titans 38–6, Drive: 3 plays, 3 yards, 1:01.
- OAK – Darren McFadden 7 yard pass from Jason Campbell (Sebastian Janikowski kick), Titans 38–13, Drive: 12 plays, 80 yards, 4:57.

Top passers

- OAK – Jason Campbell – 22/37, 180 yards, 1 touchdown, 1 interception
- TEN – Vince Young – 13/17, 154 yards, 2 touchdowns

Top rushers

- OAK – Darren McFadden – 18 rushes, 95 yards
- TEN – Chris Johnson – 27 rushes, 142 yards, 2 touchdowns

Top receivers

- OAK – Darren McFadden – 6 receptions, 55 yards, 1 touchdown
- TEN – Nate Washington – 3 receptions, 88 yards, 1 touchdown

Top tacklers

- OAK – Tyvon Branch – 6 tackles, 2 assists
- TEN – Michael Griffin – 10 tackles, 2 assists

The Raiders began their season at LP Field against the Tennessee Titans. In the first quarter, Oakland got the opening strike as kicker Sebastian Janikowski made a 34-yard field goal. The Titans would answer as quarterback Vince Young completed a 56-yard touchdown pass to wide receiver Nate Washington, followed by a 43-yard field goal from kicker Rob Bironas. Tennessee would add onto their lead in the second quarter as running back Javon Ringer 15-yard touchdown run, followed by running back Chris Johnson getting a 76-yard touchdown run. The Raiders would close out the half with Janikowski's 30-yard field goal.

Oakland's deficit would increase in the third quarter as Johnson got a 4-yard touchdown run in the third quarter. The Titans would close out their dominating day in the fourth quarter as Young hooked up with tight end Bo Scaife on a 1-yard touchdown pass. The Raiders would close out the game with quarterback Jason Campbell's 7-yard touchdown pass to running back Darren McFadden.

With the loss, Oakland began its season at 0–1.

=== Week 2: vs. St. Louis Rams ===
Week 2: St. Louis Rams at Oakland Raiders – Game summary

Quarter	1	2	3	4	Total
Rams	0	7	0	7	14
Raiders	0	3	10	3	16

at Oakland–Alameda County Coliseum, Oakland, California

- Date: September 19
- Game time: 1:05 p.m. PDT
- Game weather: 72 °F (22 °C) (Cloudy)
- Game attendance: 48,396
- Referee: Tony Corrente
- TV announcers (Fox): Ron Pitts, John Lynch and Nischelle Turner (blacked out locally)
- Recap

Game information

First quarter

- No scoring plays

Second quarter

- STL – Mark Clayton 7 yard pass from Sam Bradford (Josh Brown kick), Rams 7–0, Drive: 6 plays, 64 yards, 3:16.
- OAK – Sebastian Janikowski 38 yard field goal, Rams 7–3, Drive: 6 plays, 9 yards, 2:12.

Third quarter

- OAK – Sebastian Janikowski 41 yard field goal, Rams 7–6, Drive: 9 plays, 59 yards, 4:06.
- OAK – Louis Murphy 4 yard pass from Bruce Gradkowski (Sebastian Janikowski kick), Raiders 13–7, Drive: 7 plays, 83 yards, 3:33.

Fourth quarter

- OAK – Sebastian Janikowski 22 yard field goal, Raiders 16–7, Drive: 10 plays, 67 yards, 5:24.
- STL – Mark Clayton 17 yard pass from Sam Bradford (Josh Brown kick), Raiders 16–14, Drive: 4 plays, 59 yards, 0:47.

Top passers

- STL – Sam Bradford – 14/25, 167 yards, 2 touchdowns, 1 interception
- OAK – Bruce Gradkowski – 11/21, 162 yards, 1 touchdown, 1 interception

Top rushers

- STL – Steven Jackson – 19 rushes, 75 yards
- OAK – Darren McFadden – 30 rushes, 145 yards

Top receivers

- STL – Steven Jackson – 4 receptions, 50 yards
- OAK – Louis Murphy – 6 receptions, 91 yards, 1 touchdown

Top tacklers

- STL – James Laurinaitis – 9 tackles
- OAK – Tyvon Branch, Kamerion Wimbley – 4 tackles, 1 assist, 1 sack

Hoping to rebound from their loss to the Titans the Raiders played on home ground for an interconference duel with the Rams. In the 2nd quarter the Raiders trailed early with QB Sam Bradford making a 7-yard TD pass to WR Mark Clayton. Then the Raiders replied with kicker Sebastian Janikowski nailing a 38-yard field goal; then he booted a 41-yard field goal in the third quarter. Then the Raiders fought back and took the lead when QB Bruce Gradkowski made a 4-yard TD pass to WR Louis Murphy, followed in the fourth quarter by Janikowski nailing a 22-yard field goal. The Rams cut the lead to 2 when Bradford found WR Mark Clayton on a 17-yard TD pass, but the Raiders' defense prevented any more scoring.

With the win, the Raiders improved to 1–1.

=== Week 3: at Arizona Cardinals ===
Week 3: Oakland Raiders at Arizona Cardinals – Game summary

Quarter	1	2	3	4	Total
Raiders	13	7	0	3	23
Cardinals	10	7	7	0	24

at University of Phoenix Stadium, Glendale, Arizona

- Date: September 26
- Game time: 1:15 p.m. PDT & MDT
- Game weather: None (retractable roof closed)
- Game attendance: 62,439
- Referee: Mike Carey
- TV announcers (CBS): Spero Dedes and Randy Cross
- Recap

Game information

First quarter

- ARI – LaRod Stephens-Howling 102 yard kickoff return (Jay Feely kick), Cardinals 7–0, Drive: 0 plays, 0 yards, 0:14.
- OAK – Zach Miller 22 yard pass from Bruce Gradkowski (Sebastian Janikowski kick), Tied 7–7, Drive: 3 plays, 59 yards, 0:52.
- OAK – Sebastian Janikowski 22 yard field goal, Raiders 10–7, Drive: 5 plays, 24 yards, 1:22.
- ARI – Jay Feely 42 yard field goal, Tied 10–10, Drive: 5 plays, 56 yards, 2:47.
- OAK – Sebastian Janikowski 54 yard field goal, Raiders 13–10, Drive: 6 plays, 25 yards, 2:01.

Second quarter

- ARI – Steve Breaston 2 yard pass from Derek Anderson (Jay Feely kick), Cardinals 17–13, Drive: 12 plays, 76 yards, 6:10.
- OAK – Darren McFadden 2 yard run (Sebastian Janikowski kick), Raiders 20–17, Drive: 7 plays, 69 yards, 2:30.

Third quarter

- ARI – Larry Fitzgerald 8 yard pass from Derek Anderson (Jay Feely kick), Cardinals 24–20, Drive: 7 plays, 69 yards, 4:02.

Fourth quarter

- OAK – Sebastian Janikowski 23 yard field goal, Cardinals 24–23, Drive: 8 plays, 11 yards, 3:39.

Top passers

- OAK – Bruce Gradkowski – 17/34, 255 yards, 1 touchdown, 1 interception
- ARI – Derek Anderson – 12/26, 122 yards, 2 touchdown, 1 interception

Top rushers

- OAK – Darren McFadden – 25 rushes, 105 yards, 1 touchdown
- ARI – Beanie Wells – 14 rushes, 75 yards

Top receivers

- OAK – Louis Murphy – 5 receptions, 119 yards
- ARI – Steve Breaston – 4 receptions, 41 yards, 1 touchdown

Top tacklers

- OAK – Tyvon Branch – 9 tackles
- ARI – Kerry Rhodes – 8 tackles, 2 assists

Bruce Gradkowski came into the game as Oakland's starter at Quarterback, trying to cap on his gamewinning performance last week vs. St. Louis

Arizona started the game with a 102-yard kickoff return from LaRod Stephens-Howling. The Raiders answered quickly though when Gradkowski completed a 22-yard pass to tight-end Zach Miller. This was followed by three field goals, two for Oakland, one for Arizona, and Oakland led 13–10 at the end of the first quarter. Both Gradkowski and Derek Anderson then traded touchdowns and the Raiders led 20–17 at the half. Anderson helped Arizona take the lead late in the third quarter with an 8-yard touchdown pass to Larry Fitzgerald. Arizona led 24–20 at the end of the third quarter.

Sebastian Janikowski made the lead 24–23 with another field goal in the fourth quarter.

Arizona held on for the win after Janikowski missed a 32-yard field goal as time expired.

Both the Raiders and Cardinals committed numerous mistakes, including two muffed punts by Arizona. Oakland committed 11 penalties for 123 yards, Arizona seven for 104.

The Raiders fell to 1–2 with the loss.

=== Week 4: vs. Houston Texans ===
Week 4: Houston Texans at Oakland Raiders – Game summary

Quarter	1	2	3	4	Total
Texans	14	0	10	7	31
Raiders	7	7	0	10	24

at Oakland–Alameda County Coliseum, Oakland, California

- Date: October 3
- Game time: 3:05 p.m. CDT
- Game weather: 71 °F (22 °C) (Partly Cloudy)
- Game attendance: 32,218
- Referee: Scott Green
- TV announcers (CBS): Gus Johnson and Steve Tasker (blacked out locally)
- Recap

Game information

First quarter

- HOU – Derrick Ward 33 yard run (Neil Rackers kick), Texans 7–0, Drive: 6 plays, 90 yards, 2:48.
- OAK – Michael Bush 2 yard run (Sebastian Janikowski kick), Tied 7–7, Drive: 8 plays, 80 yards, 3:52.
- HOU – Joel Dreessen 11 yard pass from Matt Schaub (Neil Rackers kick), Texans 14–7, Drive: 5 plays, 37 yards, 1:46.

Second quarter

- OAK – Marcel Reece 13 yard pass from Bruce Gradkowski (Sebastian Janikowski kick), Tied 14–14, Drive: 9 plays, 64 yards, 4:47.

Third quarter

- HOU – Arian Foster 74 yard run (Neil Rackers kick), Texans 21–14, Drive: 2 plays, 80 yards, 0:44.
- HOU – Neil Rackers 35 yards field goal, Texans 24–14, Drive: 13 plays, 73 yards, 7:40.

Fourth quarter

- HOU – Arian Foster 10 yard pass from Matt Schaub (Neil Rackers kick), Texans 31–14, Drive: 5 plays, 35 yards, 2:20.
- OAK – Zach Miller 10 yard pass from Bruce Gradkowski (Sebastian Janikowski kick), Texans 31–21, Drive: 9 plays, 87 yards, 3:58.
- OAK – Sebastian Janikowski 39 yard field goal, Texans 31–24, Drive: 10 plays, 61 yards, 3:43.

Top passers

- HOU – Matt Schaub – 16/29, 192 yards, 2 touchdowns
- OAK – Bruce Gradkowski – 24/39, 278 yards, 2 touchdowns, 2 interceptions

Top rushers

- HOU – Arian Foster – 17 rushes, 133 yards, 1 touchdown
- OAK – Darren McFadden – 12 rushes, 47 yards

Top receivers

- HOU – Joel Dreessen – 5 receptions, 73 yards, 1 touchdown
- OAK – Zach Miller – 11 receptions, 122 yards, 1 touchdown

Top tacklers

- HOU – Bernard Pollard – 8 tackles, 3 assists
- OAK – Michael Huff – 7 tackles, 1 assist

The Raiders' fourth game was an AFC duel with the Texans at home ground. The Raiders trailed early in the 1st quarter as RB Derrick Ward got a 33-yard TD run. The Raiders replied with RB Michael Bush making a 2-yard TD run. The Raiders fell behind again when QB Matt Schaub completed an 11-yard TD pass to TE Joel Dreessen. The Raiders responded in the 2nd quarter with QB Bruce Gradkowski getting a 13-yard TD pass to FB Marcel Reece. In the 3rd quarter the Texans started to rally with RB Arian Foster making a 74-yard TD run, followed by kicker Neil Rackers getting a 35-yard field goal, then in the 4th quarter Schaub threw a 10-yard TD pass to RB Arian Foster. The Raiders tried to fight back when Gradkowski found TE Zach Miller on a 14-yard TD pass, and then kicker Sebastian Janikowski nailed a 39-yard field goal, but the Texans' defense prevented any more chances.

With the loss, the Raiders fell to 1–3.

=== Week 5: vs. San Diego Chargers ===
Week 5: San Diego Chargers at Oakland Raiders – Game summary

Quarter	1	2	3	4	Total
Chargers	0	17	7	3	27
Raiders	12	3	7	13	35

at Oakland–Alameda County Coliseum, Oakland, California

- Date: October 10
- Game time: 1:15 p.m. PDT
- Game weather: Clear
- Game attendance: 48,279
- Referee: Clete Blakeman
- TV announcers (CBS): Kevin Harlan and Solomon Wilcots (blacked out locally)
- Recap

Game information

First quarter

- OAK – Punt blocked by Rock Cartwright out of bounds in end zone for a safety, Raiders 2–0.
- OAK – Sebastian Janikowski 50 yard field goal, Raiders 5–0, Drive: 5 plays, 18 yards, 1:53.
- OAK – Hiram Eugene 5 yard return of blocked punt (Sebastian Janikowski kick), Raiders 12–0.

Second quarter

- SD – Antonio Gates 19 yard pass of Philip Rivers (Nate Kaeding kick), Raiders 12–7, Drive: 8 plays, 77 yards, 4:01.
- SD – Mike Tolbert 4 yard run (Nate Kaeding kick), Chargers 14–12, Drive: 8 plays, 81 yards, 4:08.
- OAK – Sebastian Janikowski 30 yard field goal, Raiders 15–14, Drive: 12 plays, 55 yards, 3:51.
- SD – Nate Kaeding 43 yard field goal, Chargers 17–15, Drive: 6 plays, 45 yards, 0:57.

Third quarter

- SD – Malcom Floyd 41 yard pass from Philip Rivers (Nate Kaeding kick), Chargers 24–15, Drive: 2 plays, 63 yards, 0:42.
- OAK – Zach Miller 1 yard pass from Jason Campbell (Sebastian Janikowski kick), Chargers 24–22, Drive: 12 plays, 97 yards, 6:26.

Fourth quarter

- SD – Nate Kaeding 34 yard field goal, Chargers 27–22, Drive: 9 plays, 63 yards, 4:12.
- OAK – Michael Bush 3 yard run (pass failed), Raiders 28–27, Drive: 14 plays, 73 yards, 8:21.
- OAK – Tyvon Branch 64 yard fumble return (Sebastian Janikowski kick), Raiders 35–27.

Top passers

- SD – Philip Rivers – 27/42, 431 yards, 2 touchdowns
- OAK – Jason Campbell – 13/18, 159 yards, 1 touchdown

Top rushers

- SD – Ryan Mathews – 9 rushes, 59 yards
- OAK – Michael Bush – 26 rushes, 104 yards, 1 touchdown

Top receivers

- SD – Malcom Floyd – 8 receptions, 213 yards, 1 touchdown
- OAK – Zach Miller – 6 receptions, 62 yards, 1 touchdown

Top tacklers

- SD – Paul Oliver – 6 tackles, 2 assists
- OAK – Michael Huff – 9 tackles, 2 assists, 1 sack, 1 forced fumble

The Raiders started the game with 12 unanswered points off of two blocked punts and a field goal. But San Diego quickly responded with a touchdown pass by Philip Rivers and a rush by Mike Tolbert. After the Raiders and Chargers traded field goals, the Chargers led, 17–15, after the first half.

Bruce Gradkowski was injured in the first half and after briefly starting the second half, he left the game. Jason Campbell relieved Gradkowski at the quarterback position for the rest of the game.

In the third quarter, The Chargers and Raiders traded touchdowns and heading into the fourth quarter the Raiders trailed, 24–22.

In the 4th, Nate Kaeding kicked a field goal early and extended the Chargers' lead to five, 27–22. The Raiders then capped off a 14-play, 73-yard drive with a rushing touchdown by Michael Bush, who took back the lead. After a failed two- point attempt by Oakland, they led, 28–27, with 3:24 remaining in the ballgame. The Chargers than began to drive trying to get themselves into field goal position to win the game. The Chargers eventually made it to the Raiders 23-yard line, but after a 10-yard holding penalty by the Chargers, San Diego faced a 2nd and 20 on Oakland's 33-yard line. Looking to pass, Rivers was stripped by Michael Huff and Tyvon Branch returned the fumble 64 yards for a touchdown, sealing the win for the Raiders, 35–27.

Though the Chargers outgained the Raiders, 506–279, their special teams were ultimately the deciding factor, giving up two blocked punts for a safety and touchdown. With the win the Raiders not only improved to 2–3, but also snapped a 13-game losing streak to the Chargers, with the first win over the Chargers since September 28, 2003.

=== Week 6: at San Francisco 49ers ===
Week 6: Oakland Raiders at San Francisco 49ers – Game summary

Quarter	1	2	3	4	Total
Raiders	3	3	0	3	9
49ers	0	3	7	7	17

at Candlestick Park, San Francisco, California

- Date: October 17
- Game time: 1:05 p.m. PDT
- Game weather: 53 °F (12 °C) (Rain)
- Game attendance: 69,732
- Referee: Carl Cheffers
- TV announcers (CBS): Bill Macatee and Rich Gannon
- Recap

Game information

First quarter

- OAK – Sebastian Janikowski 27 yard field goal, Raiders 3–0, Drive: 13 plays, 79 yards, 7:82.

Second quarter

- OAK – Sebastian Janikowski 24 yard field goal, Raiders 6–0, Drive: 12 plays, 85 yards, 6:22.
- SF – Joe Nedney 25 yard field goal, Raiders 6–3, Drive: 10 plays, 77 yards, 2:10.

Third quarter

- SF – Michael Crabtree 32 yard pass from Alex Smith (Joe Nedney kick), 49ers 10–6, Drive: 13 plays, 91 yards, 8:11.

Fourth quarter

- OAK – Sebastian Janikowski 40 yard field goal, 49ers 10–9, Drive: 8 plays, 55 yards, 2:53.
- SF – Vernon Davis 17 yard pass from Alex Smith (Joe Nedney kick), 49ers 17–9, Drive: 3 plays, 80 yards, 1:07.

Top passers

- OAK – Jason Campbell – 8/21, 83 yards, 2 interceptions
- SF – Alex Smith – 16/33, 196 yards, 2 touchdowns

Top rushers

- OAK – Michael Bush – 20 rushes, 47 yards
- SF – Frank Gore – 25 rushes, 149 yards

Top receivers

- OAK – Zach Miller – 2 receptions, 48 yards
- SF – Michael Crabtree – 4 receptions, 57 yards, 1 touchdown

Top tacklers

- OAK – Tyvon Branch – 7 tackles, 2 assists
- SF – Takeo Spikes – 6 tackles, 1 assist, 1 interception

Coming off their win over the Chargers the Raiders crossed the San Francisco-Oakland Bay Bridge to Candlestick Park where they played their San Francisco Bay rival, the 49ers. In the first quarter, the Raiders took the lead as kicker Sebastian Janikowski got a 27-yard field goal. Then he made a 24-yard field goal in the 2nd quarter. The 49ers replied with kicker Joe Nedney making a 25-yard field goal. The Raiders fell behind in the third quarter with QB Alex Smith making a 32-yard TD pass to WR Michael Crabtree. The Raiders cut the lead with Janikowski making a 40-yard field goal. The 49ers pulled away after Smith found TE Vernon Davis on a 17-yard TD pass.

With the loss, Oakland fell to 2–4.

=== Week 7: at Denver Broncos ===
Week 7: Oakland Raiders at Denver Broncos – Game summary

Quarter	1	2	3	4	Total
Raiders	24	14	21	0	59
Broncos	0	7	7	0	14

at INVESCO Field at Mile High, Denver, Colorado

- Date: October 24
- Game time: 2:15 p.m. MDT/1:15 p.m. PDT
- Game weather: 63 °F (17 °C) (Mostly Cloudy)
- Game attendance: 75,835
- Referee: Terry McAulay
- TV announcers (CBS): Ian Eagle and Dan Fouts
- Recap

Game information

First quarter

- OAK – Zach Miller 43 yard pass from Jason Campbell (Sebastian Janikowski kick), Raiders 7–0, Drive: 9 plays, 80 yards, 4:16.
- OAK – Chris Johnson 30 yard interception return (Sebastian Janikowski kick), Raiders 14–0.
- OAK – Darren McFadden 4 yard run (Sebastian Janikowski kick), Raiders 21–0, Drive: 3 plays, 21 yards, 1:04.
- OAK – Sebastian Janikowski 31 yard field goal, Raiders 24–0, Drive: 7 plays, 44 yards, 2:52.

Second quarter

- OAK – Darren McFadden 19 yard pass from Jason Campbell (Sebastian Janikowski kick), Raiders 31–0, Drive: 9 plays, 57 yards, 3:15.
- OAK – Darren McFadden 4 yard run (Sebastian Janikowski kick), Raiders 38–0, Drive: 3 plays, 14 yards, 1:48.
- DEN – Knowshon Moreno 7 yard pass from Kyle Orton (Matt Prater kick), Raiders 38–7, Drive: 9 plays, 68 yards, 3:17.

Third quarter

- DEN – Knowshon Moreno 27 yard pass from Kyle Orton (Matt Prater kick), Raiders 38–14, Drive: 3 plays, 64 yards, 1:26.
- OAK – Marcel Reece 1 yard run (Sebastian Janikowski kick), Raiders 45–14, Drive: 8 plays, 80 yards, 3:52.
- OAK – Darren McFadden 57 yard run (Sebastian Janikowski kick), Raiders 52–14, Drive: 1 plays, 57 yards, 0:11.
- OAK – Michael Bush 1 yard run (Sebastian Janikowski kick), Raiders 59–14, Drive: 7 plays, 68 yards, 3:59.

Fourth quarter

- No scoring plays

Top passers

- OAK – Jason Campbell – 12/20, 204 yards, 2 touchdowns
- DEN – Kyle Orton – 12/29, 197 yards, 2 touchdowns, 1 interception

Top rushers

- OAK – Darren McFadden – 16 rushes, 165 yards, 3 touchdowns
- DEN – Knowshon Moreno – 14 rushes, 53 yards

Top receivers

- OAK – Zach Miller – 3 receptions, 65 yards, 1 touchdown
- DEN – Jabar Gaffney – 4 receptions, 54 yards

Top tacklers

- OAK – Michael Huff, Mike Mitchell – 3 tackles, 1 assist, 1 forced fumble
- DEN – Marcus Thomas – 7 tackles, 3 assists

The Raiders traveled to Denver for a week 7 AFC matchup for the ages. The game began with a 42-yard touchdown pass by Jason Campbell to tight-end Zach Miller to put the Raiders ahead 7–0 with 10:44 remaining in the first quarter. But only 8 seconds later, on the Broncos' first play from scrimmage, Kyle Orton threw an interception to cornerback Chris Johnson which was returned 30 yards for a touchdown. The Raiders now led 14–0 with 10:36 remaining. But then on the Broncos' next possession, Denver fumbled the ball, which was recovered by Oakland. The Raiders capitalized on the turnover with a 4-yard rushing touchdown by Darren McFadden. But the Raiders were not yet done, forcing the Broncos to a 4th down situation on their next drive and eventually making them turn the ball over on downs, adding a field goal to the score later in the quarter for the Raiders. At the end of the first quarter, Oakland led 24–0.

Oakland began the second quarter with a 19-yard touchdown pass from Jason Campbell to Darren McFadden to make the Raiders lead 31–0. Later in the quarter, McFadden again rushed for another touchdown, making the Raiders lead over the Broncos 38–0. But the Broncos would not give up, scoring a touchdown in the dying minutes of the first half when Kyle Orton hooked up with Knowshon Moreno in the end zone. At the end of the half, Oakland led 38–7.

Early in the second half, the Broncos again scored a touchdown and brought Oakland's lead down to just 38–14. But the Raiders weren't done scoring yet, scoring 21 unanswered points, including a 57-yard touchdown run by Darren McFadden. At the end of the third quarter, the Raiders led 59–14.

No scoring happened in the fourth quarter as the Raiders benched their starters. The Raiders defeated Denver 59–14. With the win, not only the Raiders improve to 3–4, but they set a new team record with 59 points scored and beat the Broncos for the third straight year in Denver. The record would not be beaten until 2023, when the Raiders scored 63 points against the Los Angeles Chargers.

=== Week 8: vs. Seattle Seahawks ===
Week 8: Seattle Seahawks at Oakland Raiders – Game summary

Quarter	1	2	3	4	Total
Seahawks	0	0	0	3	3
Raiders	3	7	3	20	33

at Oakland–Alameda County Coliseum, Oakland, California

- Date: October 31
- Game time: 1:15 p.m. PDT
- Game weather: 66 °F (19 °C) (Sunny)
- Game attendance: 35,721
- Referee: Ed Hochuli
- TV announcers (Fox): Ron Pitts, John Lynch & Nischelle Turner (blacked out locally)
- Recap

Game information

First quarter

- OAK – Sebastian Janikowski 31 yard field goal, Raiders 3–0, Drive: 8 plays, 45 yards, 3:05.

Second quarter

- OAK – Marcel Reece 30 yard pass from Jason Campbell (Sebastian Janikowski kick), Raiders 10–0, Drive: 12 plays, 87 yards, 5:54.

Third quarter

- OAK – Sebastian Janikowski 36 yard field goal, Raiders 13–0, Drive: 9 plays, 76 yards, 3:43.

Fourth quarter

- OAK – Sebastian Janikowski 22 yard field goal, Raiders 16–0, Drive: 8 plays, 82 yards, 3:38.
- OAK – Darrius Heyward-Bey 69 yard pass from Jason Campbell (Sebastian Janikowski kick), Raiders 23–0, Drive: 1 plays, 69 yards, 0:10.
- SEA – Olindo Mare 47 yard field goal, Raiders 23–3, Drive: 11 plays, 21 yards, 4:29.
- OAK – Sebastian Janikowski 49 yard field goal, Raiders 26–3, Drive: 4 plays, 5 yards, 1:39.
- OAK – Michael Bush 4 yard run (Sebastian Janikowski kick), Raiders 33–3, Drive: 6 plays, 66 yards, 4:06.

Top passers

- SEA – Matt Hasselbeck – 13/32, 163 yards, 1 interception
- OAK – Jason Campbell – 15/27, 310 yards, 2 touchdowns

Top rushers

- SEA – Leon Washington – 5 rushes, 29 yards
- OAK – Darren McFadden – 21 rushes, 111 yards

Top receivers

- SEA – John Carlson – 3 receptions, 47 yards
- OAK – Darrius Heyward-Bey – 5 receptions, 105 yards, 1 touchdown

Top tacklers

- SEA – Lawyer Milloy – 4 tackles, 2 assists
- OAK – Tyvon Branch – 5 tackles, 3 assists, 1 sack, 1 interception

Coming off their win over the Broncos the Raiders played on home ground where they played their former division rival, the Seattle Seahawks in their first matchup in Oakland since 2002. The Raiders took command with kicker Sebastian Janikowski nailing a 31-yard field goal. This was followed in the second quarter by QB Jason Campbell's 30-yard TD pass to FB Marcel Reece. Then in the third quarter Janikowski made a 36-yard field goal. Then he made a 22-yard field goal in the fourth quarter to put the Raiders up 16–0. The rally continued with Campbell getting a 69-yard TD pass to WR Darrius Heyward-Bey. The Seahawks would make their only score of the game with kicker Olindo Mare hitting a 47-yard field goal. However, the Raiders kept their momentum up as Janikowski made a 49-yard field goal, followed by RB Michael Bush making a 4-yard TD run.

With the win, Oakland improve to 4–4.

=== Week 9: vs. Kansas City Chiefs ===
Week 9: Kansas City Chiefs at Oakland Raiders – Game summary

Quarter	1	2	3	4	OT	Total
Chiefs	0	10	3	7	0	20
Raiders	0	0	14	6	3	23

at Oakland–Alameda County Coliseum, Oakland, California

- Date: November 7
- Game time: 1:15 p.m. PST
- Game weather: 62 °F (17 °C) (Rain)
- Game attendance: 61,075
- Referee: Jeff Triplette
- TV announcers (CBS): Kevin Harlan and Solomon Wilcots
- Recap

Game information

First quarter

- No scoring plays

Second quarter

- KC – Verran Tucker 11 yard pass from Matt Cassel (Ryan Succop kick), Chiefs 7–0, Drive: 5 plays, 47 yards, 1:45.
- KC – Ryan Succop 43 yard field goal, Chiefs 10–0, Drive: 4 plays, 1 yards, 2:05.

Third quarter

- OAK – Jacoby Ford 94 yard kickoff return (Sebastian Janikowski kick), Chiefs 10–7, Drive: 0 plays, 0 yards, 0:12.
- KC – Ryan Succop 25 yard field goal, Chiefs 13–7, Drive: 8 plays, 56 yards, 3:26.
- OAK – Khalif Barnes 2 yard pass from Jason Campbell (Sebastian Janikowski kick), Raiders 14–13, Drive: 7 plays, 74 yards, 3:28.

Fourth quarter

- OAK – Sebastian Janikowski 23 yard field goal, Raiders 17–13, Drive: 12 plays, 75 yards, 4:56.
- KC – Dwayne Bowe 20 yard pass from Matt Cassel (Ryan Succop kick), Chiefs 20–17, Drive: 5 plays, 30 yards, 2:39.
- OAK – Sebastian Janikowski 41 yard field goal, Tied 20–20, Drive: 10 plays, 53 yards, 2:03.

Overtime

- OAK – Sebastian Janikowski 33 yard field goal, Raiders 23–20, Drive: 3 plays, 47 yards, 1:32.

Top passers

- KC – Matt Cassel – 20/35, 216 yards, 2 touchdowns, 1 interception
- OAK – Jason Campbell – 19/33, 229 yards, 1 touchdown, 1 interception

Top rushers

- KC – Jamaal Charles – 10 rushes, 53 yards
- OAK – Darren McFadden – 17 rushes, 89 yards

Top receivers

- KC – Dwayne Bowe – 5 receptions, 63 yards, 1 touchdown
- OAK – Jacoby Ford – 6 receptions, 148 yards

Top tacklers

- KC – Derrick Johnson – 5 tackles, 3 assists
- OAK – Richard Seymour – 7 tackles, 1 assist

At home, in front of a sellout crowd for the first time since their 2009 Home Opener, the Oakland Raiders battled the Kansas City Chiefs for control of the AFC West. The first score of the game came from the Chiefs as Matt Cassel threw an 11-yard touchdown pass to Verran Tucker to take a lead over the Raiders, 7–0. After a Ryan Succop field goal, the Chiefs led the Raiders 10–0 at the half.

The Raiders started the second half strong, as Jacoby Ford returned the opening kickoff 94 yards for a score and cut the Chiefs' lead to 10–7. After Succop kicked yet another field goal for the Chiefs, Oakland took the lead when Jason Campbell threw a 2-yard touchdown pass to Khalif Barnes. Going into the 4th Quarter, the Raiders led 14–13.

A fourth quarter Sebastian Janikowski field goal increased the Raiders' lead to 17–13. While the Raiders forced the Chiefs to punt on their next possession, punt-returner Nick Miller was charged with a controversial fumbling call. The play could not be challenged, as coach Tom Cable had used both of the Raiders' call challenges earlier in the game. On the Chiefs' ensuing drive, Cassel hooked up with Dwayne Bowe in the endzone to give the Chiefs a late 20–17 lead. In the dying seconds, the Raiders found themselves trailing until Campbell hooked up with Ford for a huge 41 yard reception setting Janikowski up for the game-tying field goal. The score tied the game at 20–20, sending it into overtime.

In overtime, the Raiders quickly forced the Chiefs to punt. On the Raiders' ensuing drive, Jason Campbell again hooked up with Jacoby Ford for a 47-yard pass completion. Sebastian Janikowski kicked a 31-yard field goal to give the Raiders an overtime win.

With the win, Oakland went into their bye week at 5–4 and snapped a seven-game home losing streak to the Chiefs. The Raiders' win also gave them their first three-game winning streak since 2002, as well as their first winning record, at any time during a season, since 2004.

=== Week 11: at Pittsburgh Steelers ===
Week 11: Oakland Raiders at Pittsburgh Steelers – Game summary

Quarter	1	2	3	4	Total
Raiders	3	0	0	0	3
Steelers	0	21	0	14	35

at Heinz Field, Pittsburgh, Pennsylvania

- Date: November 21
- Game time: 1:00 p.m. EST/10:00 a.m. PST
- Game weather: 56 °F (13 °C) (Partly sunny)
- Game attendance: 64,987
- Referee: Tony Corrente
- TV announcers (CBS): Ian Eagle and Dan Fouts
- Recap

Game information

First quarter

- OAK – Sebastian Janikowski 41 yard field goal, Raiders 3–0, Drive: 7 plays, 49 yards, 3:27.

Second quarter

- PIT – Rashard Mendenhall 5 yard run (Shaun Suisham kick), Steelers 7–3, Drive: 14 plays, 85 yards, 8:06.
- PIT – Ben Roethlisberger 16 yard run (Shaun Suisham kick), Steelers 14–3, Drive: 7 plays, 56 yards, 3:30.
- PIT – Emmanuel Sanders 22 yard pass from Ben Roethlisberger (Shaun Suisham kick), Steelers 21–3, Drive: 4 plays, 35 yards, 1:23.

Third quarter Fourth quarter

- PIT – Mike Wallace 52 yard pass from Ben Roethlisberger (Shaun Suisham kick), Steelers 28–3, Drive: 2 plays, 54 yards, 0:18.
- PIT – Isaac Redman 16 yard pass from Ben Roethlisberger (Shaun Suisham kick), Steelers 35–3, Drive: 5 plays, 41 yards, 2:24.

Top passers

- OAK – Bruce Gradkowski – 13/24, 98 yards, 1 interception
- PIT – Ben Roethlisberger – 18/29, 275 yards, 3 touchdowns

Top rushers

- OAK – Michael Bush – 4 rushes, 33 yards
- PIT – Rashard Mendenhall – 23 rushes, 59 yards, 1 touchdown

Top receivers

- OAK – Johnnie Lee Higgins – 4 receptions, 37 yards
- PIT – Mike Wallace – 3 receptions, 116 yards, 1 touchdown

Top tacklers

- OAK – Lamarr Houston – 5 tackles, 2 assists, 1 sack
- PIT – James Farrior – 7 tackles, 1 assist, 1 sack

Coming off their bye week, the Raiders flew to Heinz Field for a Week 11 duel with the Pittsburgh Steelers. Oakland delivered the game's opening punch in the first quarter with a 41-yard field goal from kicker Sebastian Janikowski. The Steelers answered with running back Rashard Mendenhall getting a 5-yard touchdown run, followed by quarterback Ben Roethlisberger getting a 16-yard touchdown run, followed by his 22-yard touchdown pass to wide receiver Emmanuel Sanders. After a scoreless third quarter, the Raiders' deficit increased in the fourth quarter as Roethlisberger completed a 52-yard touchdown pass to wide receiver Mike Wallace, followed by running back Isaac Redman getting a 16-yard touchdown pass.

There were several fights during the game, mentioned by the commentators as "reminiscent of the seventies" (the Raiders and Steelers were bitter rivals in the 1970s). The first incident came before the kickoff. Defensive tackle Richard Seymour was ejected from the game after punching Roethlisberger in the face through the facemask late in the first half.

With the loss, Oakland fell to 5–5.

=== Week 12: vs. Miami Dolphins ===
Week 12: Miami Dolphins at Oakland Raiders – Game summary

Quarter	1	2	3	4	Total
Dolphins	10	3	10	10	33
Raiders	7	7	0	3	17

at Oakland–Alameda County Coliseum, Oakland, California

- Date: November 28
- Game time: 1:05 p.m. PST
- Game weather: 54 °F (12 °C) (Sunny)
- Game attendance: 48,946
- Referee: Walt Anderson
- TV announcers (CBS): Gus Johnson and Steve Tasker (blacked out locally)
- Recap

Game information

First quarter

- OAK – Jacoby Ford 101 yard kickoff return (Sebastian Janikowski kick), Raiders 7–0, Drive: 0 plays, 0 yards, 0:13
- MIA – Dan Carpenter 49 yard field goal, Raiders 7–3, Drive: 5 plays, 29 yards, 2:07
- MIA – Patrick Cobbs 29 yard pass from Chad Henne (Dan Carpenter kick), Dolphins 10–7, Drive: 8 plays, 65 yards, 4:40

Second quarter

- OAK – Jacoby Ford 44 yard pass from Bruce Gradkowski (Sebastian Janikowski kick), Raiders 14–10, Drive: 4 plays, 58 yards, 1:17
- MIA – Dan Carpenter 23 yard field goal, Raiders 14–13, Drive: 15 plays, 75 yards, 5:28

Third quarter

- MIA – Marlon Moore 57 yard pass from Chad Henne (Dan Carpenter kick), Dolphins 20–14, Drive: 5 plays, 72 yards, 2:08
- MIA – Dan Carpenter 44 yard field goal, Dolphins 23–14, Drive: 5 plays, 18 yards, 2:48

Fourth quarter

- OAK – Sebastian Janikowski 30 yard field goal, Dolphins 23–17, Drive: 6 plays, 68 yards, 2:11
- MIA – Dan Carpenter 25 yard field goal, Dolphins 26–17, Drive: 13 plays, 73 yards, 6:54
- MIA – Ricky Williams 45 yard run (Dan Carpenter kick), Dolphins 33–17, Drive: 2 plays, 46 yards, 0:16

Top passers

- MIA – Chad Henne – 17/30, 307 yards, 2 touchdowns, 1 interception
- OAK – Bruce Gradkowski – 17/32, 252 yards, 1 touchdown, 2 interceptions

Top rushers

- MIA – Ricky Williams – 20 rushes, 95 yards, 1 touchdown
- OAK – Jacoby Ford – 1 rush, 13 yards

Top receivers

- MIA – Davone Bess – 6 receptions, 111 yards
- OAK – Jacoby Ford – 4 receptions, 108 yards, 1 touchdown

Top tacklers

- MIA – Vontae Davis – 5 tackles
- OAK – Tyvon Branch – 9 tackles, 2 assists, 1 sack

Hoping to rebound from their loss to the Steelers the Raiders played on home ground for an AFC duel with the Dolphins. The Raiders took the early advantage as Jacoby Ford returned a kick-off 101 yards for a touchdown. However, they soon trailed with kicker Dan Carpenter nailing a 49-yard field goal, followed by QB Chad Henne completing a 29-yard TD pass to RB Patrick Cobbs. The Raiders replied as QB Bruce Gradkowski made a 44-yard TD pass to Ford. They fell behind as Carpenter got a 23-yard field goal, followed by Henne getting a 57-yard TD pass to WR Marlon Moore, and with Carpenter nailing a 44-yard field goal. The Raiders tried to cut the lead when kicker Sebastian Janikowski hit a 30-yard field goal, but the Dolphins pulled away with Carpenter getting a 25-yard field goal, and with RB Ricky Williams getting a 45-yard TD run.

With the loss, Oakland fell to 5–6.

=== Week 13: at San Diego Chargers ===
Week 13: Oakland Raiders at San Diego Chargers – Game summary

Quarter	1	2	3	4	Total
Raiders	14	7	0	7	28
Chargers	0	3	3	7	13

at Qualcomm Stadium, San Diego, California

- Date: December 5
- Game time: 1:05 p.m. PST
- Game weather: 67 °F (19 °C) (Cloudy and Sun)
- Game attendance: 68,163
- Referee: John Parry
- TV announcers (CBS): Jim Nantz and Dan Fouts
- Gamebook Recap

Game information

First quarter

- OAK – (8:35) J.Campbell 9 yd. run (S.Janikowski kick), Raiders 7–0, (4 plays, 18 yards; 2:10)
- OAK – (0:30) J.Ford 4 yd. pass from J.Campbell (S.Janikowski kick), Raiders 14–0, (11 plays, 41 yards; 6:36)

Second quarter

- SD – (11:05) N.Kaeding 39 yd. Field Goal, Raiders 14–3, (9 plays, 48 yards; 4:25)
- OAK – (4:07) M.Bush 7 yd. run (S.Janikowski kick), Raiders 21–3, (11 plays, 80 yards; 6:58)

Third quarter

- SD – (0:44) N.Kaeding 33 yd. Field Goal, Raiders 21–6, (9 plays, 68 yards; 3:21)

Fourth quarter

- SD – (9:59) A.Gates 4 yd. pass from P.Rivers (N.Kaeding kick), Raiders 21–13, (6 plays, 80 yards; 2:45)
- OAK – (4:35) D.McFadden 7 yd. run (S.Janikowski kick), Raiders 28–13, (7 plays, 62 yards; 5:24)

Top passers

- OAK – Jason Campbell – 10/16, 117 yards, 1 TD
- SD – Philip Rivers – 23/39, 280 yards, 1 TD, 1 INT

Top rushers

- OAK – Darren McFadden – 19 ATT, 97 yards, 1 TD
- SD – Mike Tolbert – 7 ATT, 16 yards,

Top receivers

- OAK – Marcel Reece – 3 REC, 42 yards
- SD – Antonio Gates – 6 REC, 73 yards, 1 TD

Top tacklers

- OAK – R. McClain – 7 tackles
- SD – Brandon Siler – 9 tackles, 3 assists
- Scoring Leader: J. Campbell (OAK) – 14 PTS

After losing two straight games, the Raiders looked to rebound at Qualcomm Stadium, facing a Chargers team coming off a big win at Indianapolis. The game started well for the Raiders; thanks to a muffed punt by Darren Sproles that was recovered by Hiram Eugene at the San Diego 18 yard line, and set up a 9-yard rushing touchdown by Jason Campbell. Scoring continued in the first quarter with a 4-yard pass from Campbell to Jacoby Ford; and gave the Raiders an early 14–0 lead over the Chargers. The second quarter started with a 9-play, 48 yard drive that ended on a 39-yard field goal by Nate Kaeding, giving San Diego its first points of the game. Oakland answered with a rushing touchdown by Michael Bush, extending the lead to 21–3. The first half closed on a missed field goal by Kaeding.

The second half started with a quite calm third quarter, who saw both teams playing good defense and a Raiders team suffering with penalties. The third quarter closed with another field goal by Kaeding, nearing the Chargers on the scoreboard 21–6. The fourth quarter saw the Chargers trying to mount a comeback with a 4-yard TD pass from Philip Rivers to Antonio Gates; but it was promptly closed by a 7-play, 62 yard drive that ended with a Darren McFadden 7 yard rushing TD. With the win, both Raiders and Chargers reached a 6–6 record, and still stayed behind the Chiefs by 2 games for the division lead. The Raiders also swept the season series from the Chargers for the first time since 2001, and snapped a seven-game losing streak at Qualcomm Stadium.

The Raiders were favored by an impeding Chargers offense who struggled to control the game clock and establish a ground game; while the Raiders struggled with penalties and defensive miscues, mostly on the secondary.

=== Week 14: at Jacksonville Jaguars ===
Week 14: Oakland Raiders at Jacksonville Jaguars – Game summary

Quarter	1	2	3	4	Total
Raiders	7	10	7	7	31
Jaguars	0	7	21	10	38

at EverBank Field, Jacksonville, Florida

- Date: December 12
- Game time: 1:00 p.m. EST/10:00 a.m. PST
- Game weather: 54 °F (12 °C) (Sunny)
- Game attendance: 62,570
- Referee: Alberto Riveron
- TV announcers (CBS): Kevin Harlan and Solomon Wilcots
- Recap

Game information

First quarter

- OAK – Darren McFadden 67 yard pass from Jason Campbell (Sebastian Janikowski kick), Raiders 7–0, Drive: 3 plays, 69 yards, 1:33.

Second quarter

- JAC – Marcedes Lewis 1 yard pass from David Garrard (Josh Scobee kick), Tied 7–7, Drive: 7 plays, 45 yards, 3:36.
- OAK – Sebastian Janikowski 26 yard field goal, Raiders 10–7, Drive: 10 plays, 74 yards, 5:31.
- OAK – Louis Murphy 8 yard pass from Jason Campbell (Sebastian Janikowski kick), Raiders 17–7, Drive: 9 plays, 79 yards, 3:51.

Third quarter

- JAC – Jason Hill 48 yard pass from David Garrard (Josh Scobee kick), Raiders 17–14, Drive: 4 plays, 57 yards, 2:13.
- OAK – Darren McFadden 51 yard run (Sebastian Janikowski kick), Raiders 24–14, Drive: 3 plays, 78 yards, 1:26.
- JAC – Rashad Jennings 74 yard run (Josh Scobee kick), Raiders 24–21, Drive: 3 plays, 82 yards, 1:33.
- JAC – Mike Sims-Walker 10 yard pass from David Garrard (Josh Scobee kick), Jaguars 28–24, Drive: 5 plays, 22 yards, 2:44.

Fourth quarter

- JAC – Josh Scobee 19 yard field goal, Jaguars 31–24, Drive: 10 plays, 61 yards, 6:19.
- OAK – Darren McFadden 36 yard run (Sebastian Janikowski kick), Tied 31–31, Drive: 7 plays, 83 yards, 3:40.
- JAC – Maurice Jones-Drew 30 yard run (Josh Scobee kick), Jaguars 38–31, Drive: 1 plays, 30 yards, 0:19.

Top passers

- OAK – Jason Campbell – 21/30, 324 yards, 2 touchdowns
- JAC – David Garrard – 11/22, 159 yards, 3 touchdowns, 1 interception

Top rushers

- OAK – Darren McFadden – 16 rushes, 123 yards, 2 touchdowns
- JAC – Rashad Jennings – 5 rushes, 109 yards, 1 touchdown

Top receivers

- OAK – Darren McFadden – 3 receptions, 86 yards, 1 touchdown
- JAC – Marcedes Lewis – 4 receptions, 57 yards, 1 touchdown

Top tacklers

- OAK – Tyvon Branch – 6 tackles
- JAC – Kirk Morrison – 7 tackles

Coming off their win over the Chargers the Raiders flew to EverBank Field for an AFC duel with the Jaguars. In the first quarter the Raiders took the lead as QB Jason Campbell completed a 67-yard TD pass to RB Darren McFadden. The Jaguars replied in the second quarter with QB David Garrard making a 1-yard TD pass to TE Marcedes Lewis. They increased their lead as kicker Sebastian Janikowski nailed a 26-yard field goal, followed by Campbell throwing an 8-yard TD pass to WR Louis Murphy. The lead was narrowed as Garrard made a 48-yard TD pass to WR Jason Hill. But the Raiders replied as McFadden ran 51 yards for a touchdown. They fell behind for the first time with RB Rashad Jennings getting a 74-yard TD run, followed by Garrard getting a 10-yard TD pass to WR Mike Sims-Walker, followed by Scobee nailing a 19-yard field goal. Oakland tied the game as McFadden got a 36-yard TD run, but the Jaguars pulled out the win with RB Maurice Jones-Drew getting a 30-yard TD run.

With the loss, Oakland fell to 6–7.

=== Week 15: vs. Denver Broncos ===
Week 15: Denver Broncos at Oakland Raiders – Game summary

Quarter	1	2	3	4	Total
Broncos	14	3	3	3	23
Raiders	14	3	6	16	39

at Oakland–Alameda County Coliseum, Oakland, California

- Date: December 19
- Game time: 1:15 p.m. MST
- Game weather: Cloudy/Rainy
- Game attendance: 44,246
- Referee: Scott Green
- TV announcers (CBS): Gus Johnson and Steve Tasker (blacked out locally)
- Recap

Game information

First quarter

- OAK – Jacoby Ford 71 yard run (Sebastian Janikowski kick), Raiders 7–0, Drive: 1 plays, 71 yards, 0:12.
- DEN – Tim Tebow 40 yard run (Steven Hauschka kick), Tied 7–7, Drive: 3 plays, 26 yards, 1:56.
- DEN – Brandon Lloyd 33 yard pass from Tim Tebow (Steven Hauschka kick), Broncos 14–7, Drive: 2 plays, 32 yards, 0:44.
- OAK – Michael Bush 1 yard run (Sebastian Janikowski kick), Tied 14–14, Drive: 8 plays, 69 yards, 4:18.

Second quarter

- DEN – Steven Hauschka 46 yard field goal, Broncos 17–14, Drive: 8 plays, 42 yards, 4:11.
- OAK – Sebastian Janikowski 49 yard field goal, Tied 17–17, Drive: 5 plays, 23 yards, 1:21.

Third quarter

- OAK – Sebastian Janikowski 35 yard field goal, Raiders 20–17, Drive: 4 plays, 6 yards, 1:30.
- DEN – Steven Hauschka 35 yard field goal, Tied 20–20, Drive: 6 plays, 47 yards, 2:24.
- OAK – Sebastian Janikowski 47 yard field goal, Raiders 23–20, Drive: 6 plays, 37 yards, 3:34.

Fourth quarter

- OAK – Marcel Reece 73 yard pass from Jason Campbell (Sebastian Janikowski kick), Raiders 30–20, Drive: 1 plays, 73 yards, 0:12.
- DEN – Steven Hauschka 45 yard field goal, Raiders 30–23, Drive: 9 plays, 49 yards, 4:28.
- OAK – Correll Buckhalter tackled in end zone by Quentin Groves for a safety, Raiders 32–23.
- OAK – Michael Bush 1 yard run (Sebastian Janikowski kick), Raiders 39–23, Drive: 8 plays, 47 yards, 4:00.

Top passers

- DEN – Tim Tebow – 8/16, 138 yards, 1 touchdown
- OAK – Jason Campbell – 15/26, 238 yards, 1 touchdown, 2 interceptions

Top rushers

- DEN – Tim Tebow – 8 rushes, 78 yards, 1 touchdown
- OAK – Darren McFadden – 20 rushes, 119 yards

Top receivers

- DEN – Brandon Lloyd – 4 receptions, 79 yards, 1 touchdown
- OAK – Marcel Reece – 2 receptions, 79 yards, 1 touchdown

Top tacklers

- DEN – D.J. Williams – 7 tackles, 1 assist
- OAK – Matt Shaughnessy – 4 tackles, 4 assists

Hoping to rebound from their loss to the Jaguars the Raiders played in home ground for an AFC West rivalry rematch against the Broncos. The Raiders took the lead with Jacoby Ford running 71 yards for a touchdown. The Broncos replied as Tim Tebow scrambled 40 yards for a touchdown. The Raiders trailed as Tebow made a 33-yard TD pass to WR Brandon Lloyd. They soon responded by RB Michael Bush got a 1-yard TD run. The Broncos lead again with kicker Steven Hauschka making a 46-yard field goal, but the Raiders pulled ahead as kicker Sebastian Janikowski nailed a 49 and a 35-yard field goal. The Broncos re-tied the game after Hauschka made a 35-yard field goal, but the Raiders got the lead back with Janikowski nailing a 47-yard field goal, followed by QB Jason Campbell completing a 73-yard TD pass to FB Marcel Reece. The lead was narrowed when Hauschka nailed a 45-yard field goal, but the Raiders pulled away with OLB Quentin Groves tackling RB Correll Buckhalter in the endzone for a safety, followed by Bush getting a 1-yard TD run.

With the win, Oakland improved to 7–7.

=== Week 16: vs. Indianapolis Colts ===
Week 16: Indianapolis Colts at Oakland Raiders – Game summary

Quarter	1	2	3	4	Total
Colts	7	10	7	7	31
Raiders	7	6	3	10	26

at Oakland–Alameda County Coliseum; Oakland, California

- Date: December 26
- Game time: 1:05 PM PST
- Game weather: 58 °F (14 °C) (Sunny)
- Game attendance: 52,567
- Referee: Terry McAulay
- TV announcers (CBS): Greg Gumbel and Dan Dierdorf
- Recap

Game information

First quarter

- OAK – Jacoby Ford 99 yard kickoff return (Sebastian Janikowski kick), Raiders 7–0, Drive: 1 play, 99 yards, 0:00.
- IND – Joseph Addai 6 yard run (Adam Vinatieri kick), Tied 7–7, Drive: 6 plays, 57 yards, 2:16.

Second quarter

- IND – Adam Vinatieri 30 yard field goal, Colts 10–7, Drive: 11 plays, 50 yards, 5:02.
- OAK – Sebastian Janikowski 59 yard field goal, Tied 10–10, Drive: 9 plays, 34 yards, 5:20.
- OAK – Sebastian Janikowski 38 yard field goal, Raiders 13–10, Drive: 11 plays, 62 yards, 5:33.
- IND – Jacob Tamme 18 yard pass from Peyton Manning (Adam Vinatieri kick), Colts 17–13, Drive: 8 plays, 88 yards, 1:19.

Third quarter

- OAK – Sebastian Janikowski 51 yard field goal, Colts 17–16, Drive: 6 plays, 23 yards, 2:50.
- IND – Blair White 4 yard pass from Peyton Manning (Adam Vinatieri kick), Colts 24–16, Drive: 4 plays, 56 yards, 1:52.

Fourth quarter

- OAK – Sebastian Janikowski 45 yard field goal, Colts 24–19, Drive: 5 plays, 10 yards, 1:46.
- IND – Pierre Garçon 7 yard pass from Peyton Manning (Adam Vinatieri kick), Colts 31–19, Drive: 9 plays, 68 yards, 5:21.
- OAK – Zach Miller 6 yard pass from Jason Campbell (Sebastian Janikowski kick), Colts 31–26, Drive: 12 plays, 80 yards, 3:11.

Top passers

- IND – Peyton Manning – 16/30, 179 yards, 3 touchdowns, 2 interceptions
- OAK – Jason Campbell – 29/42, 231 yards, 1 touchdown

Top rushers

- IND – Dominic Rhodes – 17 rushes, 98 yards
- OAK – Darren McFadden – 11 rushes, 45 yads

Top receivers

- IND – Jacob Tamme – 7 receptions, 78 yards, 1 touchdown
- OAK – Zach Miller – 9 receptions, 66 yards, 1 touchdown

Top tacklers

- IND – Tyjuan Hagler – 8 tackles, 1 assist
- OAK – John Henderson – 9 tackles, 2 assists

The Raiders' fifteenth game was an AFC duel with the Colts at home. The Raiders struck immediately after a 99-yard kickoff return was made by Jacoby Ford. They soon trailed with RB Joseph Addai getting a 6-yard TD run, followed by kicker Adam Vinatieri getting a 30-yard field goal. They took the lead again after kicker Sebastian Janikowski hit a 59 and a 38-yard field goal, but trailed for the second time with QB Peyton Manning completing an 18-yard TD pass to TE Jacob Tamme. The Raiders tried to cut the lead with Janikowski nailing a 51-yard field goal, but fell further behind with Manning getting a 4-yard TD pass to WR Blair White. The Raiders tried to keep up with Janikowski making a 45-yard field goal, but the Colts kept going with Manning completing a 7-yard TD pass to WR Pierre Garçon. The Raiders tried to come back after QB Jason Campbell threw a 6-yard TD pass to TE Zach Miller, but the Colts defense prevented any more chances, giving them the loss.

With the loss, the Raiders fell to 7–8, and were officially eliminated from postseason contention for the eighth straight year.

=== Week 17: at Kansas City Chiefs ===
Week 17: Oakland Raiders at Kansas City Chiefs – Game summary

Quarter	1	2	3	4	Total
Raiders	0	10	7	14	31
Chiefs	3	0	7	0	10

at Arrowhead Stadium, Kansas City, Missouri

- Date: January 2
- Game time: 10:00 a.m. PST/12:00 p.m. CST
- Game weather: 30 °F (−1 °C) (Sunny)
- Game attendance: 67,045
- Referee: Bill Leavy
- TV announcers (CBS): Spero Dedes and Randy Cross
- Recap

Game information

First quarter

- KC – Ryan Succop 30 yard field goal, Chiefs 3–0, Drive: 4 plays, 5 yards, 0:44.

Second quarter

- OAK – Chaz Schilens 5 yard pass from Jason Campbell (Sebastian Janikowski kick), Raiders 7–3, Drive: 14 plays, 91 yards, 6:39.
- OAK – Sebastian Janikowski 38 yard field goal, Raiders 10–3, Drive: 13 plays, 54 yards, 3:06.

Third quarter

- KC – Jamaal Charles 5 yard run (Ryan Succop kick), Tied 10–10, Drive: 6 plays, 64 yards, 2:18.
- OAK – Michael Bush 26 yard run (Sebastian Janikowski kick), Raiders 17–10, Drive: 9 plays, 75 yards, 5:36.

Fourth quarter

- OAK – Jacoby Ford 10 yard run (Sebastian Janikowski kick), Raiders 24–10, Drive: 1 play, 10 yards, 0:09.
- OAK – Stanford Routt 22 yard interception return (Sebastian Janikowski kick), Raiders 31–10

Top passers

- OAK – Jason Campbell – 15/25, 155 yards, 1 touchdown
- KC – Matt Cassel – 11/33, 115 yards, 2 interceptions

Top rushers

- OAK – Michael Bush – 25 rushes, 137 yads, 1 touchdown
- KC – Jamaal Charles – 14 rushes, 87 yards, 1 touchdown

Top receivers

- OAK – Michael Bush – 4 receptions, 34 yards
- KC – Dwayne Bowe – 5 receptions, 68 yards

Top tacklers

- OAK – Rolando McClain – 8 tackles, 1 assist
- KC – Eric Berry – 7 tackles

The Raiders' final game was an AFC West rivalry rematch against the Chiefs. They trailed early as kicker Ryan Succop nailed a 30-yard field goal, but overcame the deficit with QB Jason Campbell completing a 5-yard TD pass to WR Chaz Schilens, followed by kicker Sebastian Janikowski hitting a 38-yard field goal. The Chiefs tied the game with RB Jamaal Charles getting a 5-yard TD run, but the Raiders got the lead back with RB Michael Bush getting a 26-yard TD run, followed by Jacoby Ford getting a 10-yard TD run, then with CB Stanford Routt returning an interception 22 yards for a touchdown.

With the win, the Raiders finished the season with an 8–8 record, but this was not good enough to retain Tom Cable as head coach. Not long after the regular season ended, the Raiders chose not to exercise their option to retain Cable, thus he was released from the Raider organization. This season, the Raiders set the dubious record as the first (and to date, the only) NFL team ever to post a perfect record in divisional games (going 6-0 against AFC West opponents) and yet not win the division; the Raiders, in fact, did not even qualify for the post-season.

== TV blackouts ==
The first four games of the season were blacked out for Oakland with crowds under 50,000, and a season low of just over 32,000 in a game against Houston. But, big wins against Denver and Seattle for the Raiders led to an increase in ticket sales for the Week 9 match-up against the Chiefs, which was sold out and was the only Raiders home game televised in the market in 2010 (ironically, the Chiefs are actually the Raiders' easternmost division rivals).
