= 2009 Oakland Raiders season =

50th season in franchise history

- Raiders 50th season logo
- Owner: Al Davis
- General manager: Al Davis
- Head coach: Tom Cable
- Home stadium: Oakland–Alameda County Coliseum

Results
- Record: 5–11
- Division place: 3rd AFC West
- Playoffs: Did not qualify
- All-Pros: P Shane Lechler (1st team); CB Nnamdi Asomugha (2nd team)
- Pro Bowlers: Nnamdi Asomugha, CB; Jon Condo, LS; Shane Lechler, P

The 2009 Oakland Raiders season was the 50th season for the original American Football League (AFL) team, and its 40th in the National Football League (NFL). On September 6, 2009, The Raiders traded a 2011 draft pick to the New England Patriots for 5× Pro Bowl Defensive Lineman Richard Seymour. With their loss to Dallas on November 26, 2009, The Raiders sealed their seventh consecutive losing season. After beating the Pittsburgh Steelers on December 6, 2009, the Raiders moved to 4–0 when playing Pittsburgh the year they won the Super Bowl, or are the defending Champions, winning in 1974, 1980, 2006, and now 2009. However, they missed the playoffs for a new team record 7th season.

== Off Season ==
=== Draft ===
2009 Oakland Raiders draft
Round	Pick	Player	Position	College	Notes
1	7	Darrius Heyward-Bey	WR	Maryland	
2	47	Michael Mitchell	S	Ohio	
3	71	Matt Shaughnessy	DE	Wisconsin	
4	124	Louis Murphy	WR	Florida	from New England
4	126	Slade Norris	DE	Oregon	from Miami
6	199	Stryker Sulak	DE	Missouri	from New England
6	202	Brandon Myers	TE	Iowa	from Carolina
Made roster † Pro Football Hall of Fame * Made at least one Pro Bowl during career

== Local TV Blackouts ==
In 2009, once again the Raiders struggled to sell tickets, resulting in 7 of their 8 home games being blacked out on local television. The Raiders were able to sell out their season opener, on Monday Night Football against the San Diego Chargers, thanks to a deadline extension from the NFL. But, the remainder of their home games were not shown on local television, because the games didn't sell out. The Raiders finished the season tied with the Jacksonville Jaguars for most television blackouts in 2009. But, blackouts are nothing new to Oakland fans, as the Raiders have sold out only 25 of 88 regular season games, since returning to Oakland. The Raiders had 3 games with attendances under 40,000, with their lowest attendance coming in week 11 against the Cincinnati Bengals when they drew only 34,112.

== Staff ==
Oakland Raiders 2009 staff
Front office: Principal owner/general manager – Al Davis; Chief executive – Amy Trask; Senior executive – John Herrera; Pro player personnel – Keith Rowen; Salary cap administrator – Tom Delaney; Director of college scouting – Jon Kingdon; Head coaches: Head coach – Tom Cable; Offensive coaches: Passing game coordinator – Ted Tollner; Quarterbacks – Paul Hackett; Running backs – Kelly Skipper; Wide receivers – Sanjay Lal; Tight ends – Adam Henry; Offensive line – Jim Michalczik; Assistant offensive line – Chris Morgan; Offensive quality control – Rich Scangarello	Defensive coaches: Defensive coordinator – John Marshall; Defensive line – Dwaine Board; Linebackers – Mike Haluchak; Defensive backs – Lionel Washington; Defensive backs assistant/Squad development– Willie Brown; Defensive assistant – Randy Hanson; Defensive quality control - Bert Leone; Special teams coaches: Special teams coordinator – John Fassel; Special teams assistant – Aaron Pelch; Strength and conditioning: Strength and conditioning – Brad Roll

== Final roster ==
2009 Oakland Raiders roster
Quarterbacks (QB): 3 Charlie Frye; 5 Bruce Gradkowski; 7 J. P. Losman; 2 JaMarcus Russell; Running backs (RB): 29 Michael Bush; 25 Justin Fargas; 20 Darren McFadden; 45 Marcel Reece FB; 22 Gary Russell KR; Wide receivers (WR): 12 Darrius Heyward-Bey; 15 Johnnie Lee Higgins; 18 Louis Murphy; 81 Chaz Schilens; 84 Javon Walker; 19 Todd Watkins; Tight ends (TE): 80 Zach Miller; 83 Brandon Myers; 86 Tony Stewart	Offensive linemen (OL): 69 Khalif Barnes T; 66 Cooper Carlisle G; 74 Cornell Green T; 75 Mario Henderson T; 51 Chris Morris C/G; 72 Erik Pears G/T; 64 Samson Satele C; 70 Langston Walker G; Defensive linemen (DL): 90 Desmond Bryant DT; 99 Greg Ellis DE; 97 Greyson Gunheim DE; 94 William Joseph DT; 93 Tommy Kelly DT; 98 Jay Richardson DE; 92 Richard Seymour DE; 77 Matt Shaughnessy DE; 61 Gerard Warren DT	Linebackers (LB): 50 Isaiah Ekejiuba MLB; 53 Thomas Howard OLB; 52 Kirk Morrison MLB; 56 David Nixon OLB; 91 Trevor Scott OLB; 54 Sam Williams OLB; Defensive backs (DB): 21 Nnamdi Asomugha CB; 30 Jerome Boyd SS; 33 Tyvon Branch SS; 31 Hiram Eugene FS; 23 Jonathan Holland CB/KR; 24 Michael Huff FS; 37 Chris Johnson CB; 34 Mike Mitchell SS; 26 Stanford Routt CB; Special teams (ST): 59 Jon Condo LS; 11 Sebastian Janikowski K; 9 Shane Lechler P	Practice squad: 10 Shaun Bodiford WR; 16 Paul Hubbard WR; 62 Tim Mattran C; 8 Jeff Otis QB; 63 Brandon Rodd G/T; Reserve: 55 Jon Alston LB (IR); 57 Ricky Brown LB (IR); 76 Robert Gallery G (IR); 44 Luke Lawton FB (Susp.); 89 Nick Miller WR (IR); 58 Slade Norris LB (IR); 46 Oren O'Neal FB (IR); 71 John Wade C (IR); Rookies in italics 53 active, 8 reserve, 5 practice squad

== Schedule ==
=== Preseason ===
Week	Date	Opponent	Result	Record	Game site	NFL.com recap
1	August 13	Dallas Cowboys	**W** 31–10	1–0	Oakland–Alameda County Coliseum	Recap
2	August 22	San Francisco 49ers	**L** 20–21	1–1	Candlestick Park	Recap
3	August 29	New Orleans Saints	**L** 7–45	1–2	Oakland–Alameda County Coliseum	Recap
4	September 3	Seattle Seahawks	**L** 21–31	1–3	Qwest Field	Recap

=== Regular season ===
Week	Date	Opponent	Result	Record	Game site	NFL.com recap
1	September 14	**San Diego Chargers** †	**L** 20–24	0–1	Oakland–Alameda County Coliseum	Recap
2	September 20	at **Kansas City Chiefs**	**W** 13–10	1–1	Arrowhead Stadium	Recap
3	September 27	**Denver Broncos**	**L** 3–23	1–2	Oakland–Alameda County Coliseum	Recap
4	October 4	at Houston Texans	**L** 6–29	1–3	Reliant Stadium	Recap
5	October 11	at New York Giants	**L** 7–44	1–4	Giants Stadium	Recap
6	October 18	Philadelphia Eagles	**W** 13–9	2–4	Oakland–Alameda County Coliseum	Recap
7	October 25	New York Jets †	**L** 0–38	2–5	Oakland–Alameda County Coliseum	Recap
8	November 1	at **San Diego Chargers**	**L** 16–24	2–6	Qualcomm Stadium	Recap
9	Bye					
10	November 15	**Kansas City Chiefs** †	**L** 10–16	2–7	Oakland–Alameda County Coliseum	Recap
11	November 22	Cincinnati Bengals	**W** 20–17	3–7	Oakland–Alameda County Coliseum	Recap
12	November 26	at Dallas Cowboys †	**L** 7–24	3–8	Cowboys Stadium	Recap
13	December 6	at Pittsburgh Steelers	**W** 27–24	4–8	Heinz Field	Recap
14	December 13	Washington Redskins	**L** 13–34	4–9	Oakland–Alameda County Coliseum	Recap
15	December 20	at **Denver Broncos**	**W** 20–19	5–9	INVESCO Field at Mile High	Recap
16	December 27	at Cleveland Browns	**L** 9–23	5–10	Cleveland Browns Stadium	Recap
17	January 3	Baltimore Ravens	**L** 13–21	5–11	Oakland–Alameda County Coliseum	Recap

Notes: Division games are in bold text.

† These four games were among the 16 that the NFL designated as "AFL Legacy Games", in honor of the 50th anniversary of the AFL. The Raiders wore their throwback uniforms during those four games, as did the Chargers, Jets, Chiefs and Cowboys.

== Standings ==
AFC West
	W	L	T	PCT	DIV	CONF	PF	PA	STK
^{(2)} San Diego Chargers	13	3	0	.813	5–1	9–3	454	320	W11
Denver Broncos	8	8	0	.500	3–3	6–6	326	324	L4
Oakland Raiders	5	11	0	.313	2–4	4–8	197	379	L2
Kansas City Chiefs	4	12	0	.250	2–4	3–9	294	424	W1

== Regular season results ==
=== Week 1: vs. San Diego Chargers ===
Quarter	1	2	3	4	Total
Chargers	0	10	0	14	24
Raiders	7	3	0	10	20

at Oakland–Alameda County Coliseum, Oakland, California

- Game time: 10:15 pm EDT/7:15 pm PDT
- Game weather: 63 °F (17 °C) (Clear)
- Game attendance: 61,940
- Referee: Carl Cheffers
- TV announcers (ESPN): Mike Greenberg (play-by-play), Mike Golic, Steve Young (color commentators), & Michele Tafoya (sideline reporter)

The Raiders began their season with a Week 1 AFL Legacy duel against their AFC West rival, the San Diego Chargers, in the second game of an MNF doubleheader. In the first quarter, Oakland got off to a surprising good start. While the defense (led by newly acquired defensive lineman Richard Seymour) kept the Chargers offense in control, the Raiders offense struck first with running back Michael Bush getting a 4-yard touchdown run. San Diego would respond in the second quarter as running back LaDainian Tomlinson got a 1-yard touchdown run. Oakland would answer with what looked like a 19-yard touchdown pass to rookie wide receiver Louis Murphy, but was overturned as he was unable to get full control of the ball. The Raiders would have to settle with kicker Sebastian Janikowski making a 37-yard field goal, while the Chargers closed out the half with kicker Nate Kaeding getting a 47-yard field goal.

After a scoreless third quarter, Oakland regained the lead as Janikowski nailed a 35-yard field goal, but San Diego answered with quarterback Philip Rivers completing a 15-yard touchdown pass to wide receiver Vincent Jackson. Afterwards, the Raiders got the lead again as quarterback JaMarcus Russell completed a 57-yard touchdown pass to Murphy on 4th & long. However, the Chargers came right back as running back Darren Sproles got a 5-yard touchdown run. Oakland tried to rally, but an interception ended all hopes of a comeback.

With the tough loss, the Raiders began their season at 0–1.

=== Week 2: at Kansas City Chiefs ===
Quarter	1	2	3	4	Total
Raiders	0	3	3	7	13
Chiefs	3	0	0	7	10

at Arrowhead Stadium, Kansas City, Missouri

- Game time: 1:00 pm EDT/10:00 am PDT
- Game weather: 72 °F (22 °C) (Partly Cloudy)
- Game attendance: 69,169
- Referee: Walt Anderson
- TV announcers (CBS): Kevin Harlan & Solomon Wilcots

Hoping to rebound from their loss to the Chargers, the Raiders flew to Arrowhead Stadium for a Week 2 AFC West duel with the Kansas City Chiefs. Oakland would trail in the first quarter as Chiefs kicker Ryan Succop got a 23-yard field goal. The Raiders would tie the game in the second quarter as kicker Sebastian Janikowski got a 48-yard field goal. In the third quarter, Oakland took the lead as Janikowski nailed a 54-yard field goal. In the fourth quarter, Kansas City took the lead as quarterback Matt Cassel completed a 29-yard touchdown pass to wide receiver Dwayne Bowe. Afterwards, Oakland claimed victory as running back Darren McFadden got the game-winning 5-yard touchdown run.

With the win, the Raiders improved to 1–1.

=== Week 3: vs. Denver Broncos ===
Quarter	1	2	3	4	Total
Broncos	10	3	7	3	23
Raiders	0	3	0	0	3

at Oakland–Alameda County Coliseum, Oakland, California

- Game time: 4:15 pm EDT/1:15 pm PDT
- Game weather: 81 °F (27 °C) (Sunny)
- Game attendance: 45,602
- Referee: Ed Hochuli
- TV announcers (CBS): Ian Eagle & Rich Gannon (blacked out locally)

Coming off their divisional road win over the Chiefs, the Raiders went home for a Week 3 AFC West duel with the Denver Broncos. Oakland would trail in the first quarter as Broncos quarterback Kyle Orton completed a 2-yard touchdown pass to wide receiver Brandon Marshall, followed by kicker Matt Prater's 48-yard field goal. The Raiders would get on the board in the second quarter as kicker Sebastian Janikowski made a 48-yard field goal, yet Denver answered with Prater's 21-yard field goal. From here on out, the Broncos were in control as running back Knowshon Moreno got a 7-yard touchdown run in the third quarter and Prater nailed a 24-yard field goal in the fourth quarter.

With the loss, Oakland fell to 1–2.

=== Week 4: at Houston Texans ===
Quarter	1	2	3	4	Total
Raiders	3	3	0	0	6
Texans	3	17	9	0	29

at Reliant Stadium, Houston, Texas

- Game time: 1:00 pm EDT/10:00 am PDT
- Game weather: None (Dome Closed)
- Game attendance: 70,291
- Referee: Don Carey
- TV announcers (CBS): Gus Johnson & Steve Tasker

Hoping to rebound from their divisional home loss to the Broncos, the Raiders flew to Reliant Stadium for a Week 4 duel with the Houston Texans. Following a 26-yard field goal from Texans kicker Kris Brown, Oakland would answer with kicker Sebastian Janikowski's 46-yard field goal. However, Houston would take control in the second quarter. Following Brown's 34-yard field goal, running back Steve Slaton would get a 32-yard touchdown run and catch quarterback Matt Schaub's 18-yard touchdown pass. The Raiders would close out the half with Janikowski's 33-yard field goal. In the third quarter, the Texans would put Oakland out of their misery with linebacker Brian Cushing tackling running back Justin Fargas in his own end zone for a safety. Afterwards, Houston closed out the game's scoring with wide receiver Jacoby Jones returning the immediate kickoff 95 yards for a touchdown.

With the loss, Oakland fell to 1–3.

=== Week 5: at New York Giants ===
Quarter	1	2	3	4	Total
Raiders	0	7	0	0	7
Giants	14	17	10	3	44

at Giants Stadium, East Rutherford, New Jersey

- Game time: 1:00 pm EDT/10:00 am PDT
- Game weather: 61 °F (16 °C) (Sunny)
- Game attendance: 79,012
- Referee: John Parry
- TV announcers (CBS): Greg Gumbel & Dan Dierdorf

Hoping to end a two-game losing streak, the Raiders flew to Giants Stadium for a Week 5 interconference duel with the New York Giants. Oakland immediately trailed in the opening period as Giants running back Ahmad Bradshaw got a 1-yard and a 19-yard touchdown run. Things continued to get worse for the Raiders in the second quarter as quarterback Eli Manning completed a 30-yard touchdown pass to wide receiver Mario Manningham and hooked up with wide receiver Hakeem Nicks. Oakland would answer with a 5-yard touchdown run from running back Michael Bush, yet New York closed out the half with a 25-yard field goal by kicker Lawrence Tynes. For the second half, the Giants would stay in control as quarterback David Carr got a 12-yard touchdown run and Tynes would boot a 33-yard and a 37-yard field goal.

With the loss, the Raiders fell to 1–4.

=== Week 6: vs. Philadelphia Eagles ===
Quarter	1	2	3	4	Total
Eagles	3	3	0	3	9
Raiders	7	3	0	3	13

at Oakland–Alameda County Coliseum, Oakland, California

- Game time: 4:05 pm EDT/1:05 pm PDT
- Game weather: 62 °F (17 °C) (Partly Cloudy)
- Game attendance: 49,642
- Referee: Pete Morelli
- TV announcers (Fox): Sam Rosen & Tim Ryan (blacked out locally)

Trying to snap a three-game losing streak, the Raiders went home for a Week 6 interconference duel with the Philadelphia Eagles. In the first quarter, Philadelphia delivered the opening hit as kicker David Akers made a 45-yard field goal. The Raiders would answer with quarterback JaMarcus Russell's 86-yard touchdown pass to tight end Zach Miller. In the second quarter, both teams swapped field goals as Oakland's Sebastian Janikowski got a 29-yard field goal while Akers gave the Eagles a 43-yard field goal. After a scoreless third quarter, the Raiders turned to Janikowski again in the fourth quarter as he booted a 46-yard field goal. Philadelphia tried to make a comeback, but Oakland would only allow a 45-yard field goal from Akers.

With the win, the Raiders improved to 2–4.

=== Week 7: vs. New York Jets ===
Quarter	1	2	3	4	Total
Jets	14	10	7	7	38
Raiders	0	0	0	0	0

at Oakland–Alameda County Coliseum, Oakland, California

- Game time: 4:05 pm EDT/1:05 pm PDT
- Game weather: 70 °F (21 °C) (Sunny)
- Game attendance: 39,354
- Referee: Gene Steratore
- TV announcers (CBS): Greg Gumbel & Dan Dierdorf (Blacked out locally)

Coming off their upset win over the Eagles, the Raiders stayed at home, donned their throwbacks, and played a Week 7 AFL Legacy game with the New York Jets. Oakland would trail early in the first quarter as early turnovers led to a 1-yard touchdown run Thomas Jones, followed by a 3-yard touchdown run by quarterback Mark Sanchez. The Raiders' season-long woes continued in the second quarter as New York running back Shonn Greene got an 8-yard touchdown run, followed by kicker Jay Feely booting a 39-yard field goal. Afterwards, the Jets would pull away as Sanchez completed a 35-yard touchdown pass to wide receiver David Clowney in the third quarter, followed by Greene's 33-yard touchdown run in the fourth quarter.

With the shutout loss, Oakland fell to 2–5.

=== Week 8: at San Diego Chargers ===
Quarter	1	2	3	4	Total
Raiders	0	10	3	3	16
Chargers	7	14	0	3	24

at Qualcomm Stadium, San Diego, California

- Game time: 4:05 pm EST/1:05 pm PST
- Game weather: 78 °F (26 °C) (Sunny)
- Game attendance: 67,016
- Referee: Terry McAulay
- TV announcers (CBS): Dick Enberg & Dan Fouts

Hoping to rebound from their shutout home loss to the Jets, the Raiders flew to Qualcomm Stadium for a Week 8 AFC West rematch with the San Diego Chargers. Oakland would trail in the first quarter as Chargers running back LaDainian Tomlinson got a 6-yard touchdown run. The Raiders answered in the second quarter as running back Justin Fargas got a 5-yard touchdown run, but San Diego replied with quarterback Philip Rivers' 8-yard touchdown pass to wide receiver Vincent Jackson and Tomlinson's 10-yard touchdown run. Afterwards, Oakland would close out the half as kicker Sebastian Janikowski got a 48-yard field goal.

In the second quarter, the Raiders tried to rally as Janikowski nailed a 41-yard field goal in the third quarter and a 28-yard field goal in the fourth, but the Chargers pulled away with a 28-yard field goal from kicker Nate Kaeding.

With the loss, Oakland fell to 2–6 entering their bye week.

=== Week 10: vs. Kansas City Chiefs ===
Quarter	1	2	3	4	Total
Chiefs	3	10	0	3	16
Raiders	10	0	0	0	10

at Oakland–Alameda County Coliseum, Oakland, California

- Game time: 4:05 pm EST/1:05 pm PST
- Game weather: 60 °F (16 °C) (Sunny)
- Game attendance: 40,720
- Referee: Mike Carey
- TV announcers (CBS): Gus Johnson & Steve Tasker (blacked out locally)

Coming off their bye week, the Raiders went home, donned their throwbacks, and played a Week 10 AFL Legacy game with the Kansas City Chiefs. In the first quarter, Oakland struck first with a 1-yard touchdown run from running back Justin Fargas. The Chiefs would get on the boards via a 50-yard field goal from kicker Ryan Succop, yet the Raiders came right back with their own 50-yard field goal from kicker Sebastian Janikowski. However, Kansas City would take the lead in the second quarter with running back Jamaal Charles getting a 44-yard touchdown run and Succop booting a 25-yard field goal. After a scoreless third quarter, the Chiefs would pull away as Succop nailed a 31-yard field goal.

With the loss, Oakland fell to 2–7.

=== Week 11: vs. Cincinnati Bengals ===
Quarter	1	2	3	4	Total
Bengals	7	7	3	0	17
Raiders	0	7	3	10	20

at Oakland–Alameda County Coliseum, Oakland, California

- Game time: 4:15 pm EST/1:15 pm PST
- Game weather: 54 °F (12 °C) (Overcast)
- Game attendance: 34,112
- Referee: Don Carey
- TV announcers (CBS): Kevin Harlan & Solomon Wilcots (blacked out locally)

Trying to snap a three-game losing streak, the Raiders stayed at home for a Week 11 duel with the Cincinnati Bengals. Due to quarterback JaMarcus Russell's ineffectiveness, quarterback Bruce Gradkowski would get the start.

Oakland would trail in the first quarter as Bengals quarterback Carson Palmer got a 1-yard touchdown run. Cincinnati's lead would increase as Palmer got another 1-yard touchdown run, yet the Raiders would close out the half with Gradkowski completing a 10-yard touchdown pass to tight end Zach Miller.

In the third quarter, Oakland continued to rally as kicker Sebastian Janikowski got a 52-yard field goal. The Bengals would answer with kicker Shayne Graham nailing a 25-yard field goal. The Raiders would tie the game in the fourth quarter as Gradkowski found rookie wide receiver Louis Murphy on a 29-yard touchdown pass. Afterwards, after recovering a special team fumble from Cincinnati wide receiver Andre Caldwell, Oakland took advantage as Janikowski booted the game-winning 33-yard field goal.

With the win, the Raiders improved to 3–7.

=== Week 12: at Dallas Cowboys ===
Quarter	1	2	3	4	Total
Raiders	0	0	7	0	7
Cowboys	3	14	0	7	24

at Cowboys Stadium, Arlington, Texas

- Game time: 4:15 pm EST/1:15 pm PST
- Game weather: 62 °F (17 °C) (Dome Open)
- Game attendance: 83,489
- Referee: Carl Cheffers
- TV announcers (CBS): Jim Nantz & Phil Simms

With the loss, the Raiders dropped to 3–8.

=== Week 13: at Pittsburgh Steelers ===
Quarter	1	2	3	4	Total
Raiders	3	3	0	21	27
Steelers	3	7	0	14	24

at Heinz Field, Pittsburgh, Pennsylvania

- Game time: 1:00 pm EST/10:00 am PST
- Game weather: 29 °F (−2 °C) (Mostly Sunny)
- Game attendance: 61,820
- Referee: Jerome Boger
- TV announcers (CBS): Greg Gumbel & Dan Dierdorf

With the win, the Raiders improved to 4–8.

=== Week 14: vs. Washington Redskins ===
Quarter	1	2	3	4	Total
Redskins	7	10	0	17	34
Raiders	3	7	3	0	13

at Oakland–Alameda County Coliseum, Oakland, California

- Game time: 4:05 pm EST/1:05 pm PST
- Game weather: 52 °F (11 °C) (Rain)
- Game attendance: 44,506
- Referee: Walt Anderson
- TV announcers (Fox): Dick Stockton & Charles Davis (blacked out locally)

With the loss, the Raiders dropped to 4–9 securing them their 6th straight losing season and disqualification from playoff contention. Oakland would finish 1-3 against the NFC East.

=== Week 15: at Denver Broncos ===
Quarter	1	2	3	4	Total
Raiders	0	13	0	7	20
Broncos	6	0	10	3	19

at INVESCO Field at Mile High, Denver, Colorado

- Game time: 4:05 pm EST/2:05 pm MST
- Game weather: 57 °F (14 °C)(Sunny)
- Game attendance: 74,502
- Referee: Alberto Riverson
- TV announcers (CBS): Gus Johnson & Steve Tasker

With the win, the Raiders improved to 5–9.

=== Week 16: at Cleveland Browns ===
Quarter	1	2	3	4	Total
Raiders	3	6	0	0	9
Browns	10	7	3	3	23

at Cleveland Browns Stadium, Cleveland, Ohio

- Game time: 1:00 pm EST/10:00 am PST
- Game weather: 34 °F (1 °C) (Cloudy, Light snow)
- Game attendance: 67,964
- Referee: Jeff Triplette
- TV announcers (CBS): Don Criqui & Randy Cross

With the loss, the Raiders dropped to 5–10.

=== Week 17: vs. Baltimore Ravens ===
Quarter	1	2	3	4	Total
Ravens	7	7	0	7	21
Raiders	0	10	3	0	13

at Oakland–Alameda County Coliseum, Oakland, California

- Game time: 4:15 pm PST
- Game weather: 56 °F (13 °C)
- Game attendance: 38,400
- Referee: Tony Corrente
- TV announcers (CBS): Jim Nantz & Phil Simms (blacked out locally)

Statistically speaking, the Ravens' victory over the Raiders also allowed the dethroning of the defending world champion Pittsburgh Steelers, who would not see any playoff contention. Whatever the case, the Raiders ended their dismal season at 5–11.

== See also ==
- List of organizational conflicts in the NFL
