= Michael Huff =

American football player (born 1983)

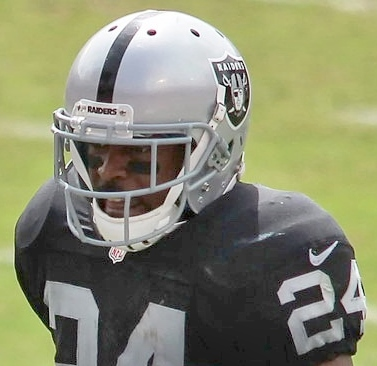
- Huff with the Oakland Raiders in 2012

No. 24, 29
- Position: Safety

Personal information
- Born: March 6, 1983 (age 43); Irving, Texas, U.S.
- Listed height: 6 ft 0 in (1.83 m)
- Listed weight: 211 lb (96 kg)

Career information
- High school: Nimitz (Irving, Texas)
- College: Texas (2001–2005)
- NFL draft: 2006: 1st round, 7th overall pick

Career history
- Oakland Raiders (2006–2012); Baltimore Ravens (2013); Denver Broncos (2013)

Awards and highlights
- Second-team All-Pro (2010); BCS national champion (2005); Unanimous All-American (2005); 2× First-team All-Big 12 (2004, 2005); Jim Thorpe Award (2005)

Career NFL statistics
- Total tackles: 446
- Interceptions: 11
- Pass deflections: 55
- Forced fumbles: 4
- Sacks: 5.5
- Stats at Pro Football Reference
- College Football Hall of Fame

Michael Wayne Huff II (born March 6, 1983) is an American former professional football player who was a safety in the National Football League (NFL). He played college football for the Texas Longhorns and then played eight years in the NFL, primarily with the Oakland Raiders, who had drafted him with the seventh overall pick in the 2006 NFL draft. At Texas, he won a national championship and was recognized as a unanimous All-American and the top college defensive back. In the NFL, he was second-team All-Pro in 2010. In his last NFL season, he played briefly for both the Baltimore Ravens and the Denver Broncos. With the Broncos, he was part of the team that suffered a loss at Super Bowl XLVIII, despite not playing in it. After retiring as a player, he returned to Texas as a coach. Huff was inducted into the College Football Hall of Fame in 2025.

== Early life ==
Huff was born in Irving, Texas. He attended Nimitz High School in Irving, and was a three-year letterman in football and a four-year letterman in track. In football, he played wide receiver, cornerback, and safety, contributed in the playoffs his freshmen and junior years. His football jersey No. 23 was retired by Nimitz High School. Huff was inducted into the Irving Independent School District Hall of Fame Class in 2013.

== College career ==
=== Football ===
Huff attended the University of Texas at Austin, where he played for coach Mack Brown's Texas Longhorns football team from 2001 to 2005. He was recognized as a unanimous All-American in 2005 and won the Jim Thorpe Award as the nation's best defensive back. In 2002, he earned a third-team Freshman All-American selection from the Sporting News. He had four career interceptions returned for touchdowns, a school record. In the Rose Bowl game against the USC Trojans, Huff recovered a fumbled lateral from Reggie Bush, a play that many credit with changing the momentum of the game and helping the 2005 Texas Longhorns football team win the NCAA National Championship. He also was the key defender who prevented USC running back LenDale White from gaining a first down on a crucial fourth-down-and-two with USC leading late in the 4th quarter.

=== Track and field ===
Huff also ran track and field at the University of Texas at Austin, where he recorded personal bests of 6.67 seconds in the 60 meters and 10.13 seconds in the 100 meters.

Personal bests

Event	Time (seconds)	Venue	Date
60 meters	6.67	Houston, Texas	January 29, 2005
100 meters	10.13	Irving, Texas	April 14, 2000
200 meters	20.96	Lockhart, Texas	April 20, 2000

== Professional career ==
Pre-draft measurables
Height	Weight	Arm length	Hand span	40-yard dash	10-yard split	20-yard split	Vertical jump	Broad jump	Bench press
6 ft 0 in (1.83 m)	204 lb (93 kg)	31 3/8 in (0.80 m)	8 3/4 in (0.22 m)	4.35 s	1.51 s	2.56 s	40.5 in (1.03 m)	10 ft 5 in (3.18 m)	21 reps
All values from NFL Combine

=== Oakland Raiders ===
==== 2006 season ====
Michael Huff was selected in the first round (seventh overall) by the Oakland Raiders in the 2006 NFL draft. After immediately being named the starter at strong safety in his rookie year, he recorded 78 tackles. On October 22, 2006, in a game against the Arizona Cardinals, Huff recorded 4 solo tackles and his first safety. He started all 16 games in his rookie season.

==== 2007 season ====
His first forced fumble came in his second year in a match-up against the Houston Texans on November 11, 2007. His first interception came in a game against a division rival, the Kansas City Chiefs, which set up kicker Sebastian Janikowski for the field goal, leading to a 20–17 victory. Huff ended the game with an impressive performance, adding in 9 total tackles (7 solo, 2 assists). The following week, against another division rival, the Denver Broncos, Huff sacked quarterback Jay Cutler. Huff finished the 2007 season with 85 tackles, 1 forced fumble and 1 interception.

Huff was moved to free safety after the acquisition of Gibril Wilson.

==== 2008 season ====
After recording just 12 tackles through the first 5 games of the 2008 season, Michael Huff was benched from his free safety position in favor of Hiram Eugene.

==== 2009 season ====
At the start of the 2009 season, Oakland had Hiram Eugene and Huff splitting snaps. Huff displayed excellent ball skills in the first two weeks, intercepting 3 passes. Huff finished the season with 59 tackles, half a sack and 3 interceptions, playing next to strong safety Tyvon Branch.

==== 2010 season ====
Huff opened the 2010 season as the Raiders' starting free safety, still playing next to Tyvon Branch. The 2010 season would be the Raiders' best season (at 8-8) since losing Super Bowl XXXVII to the Tampa Bay Buccaneers. For the second straight year, Huff finished with 3 interceptions, along with career highs in almost every defensive category. His efforts led to his only All-Pro section, where he was selected as a 2nd team All-Pro. He was also 1st Team All Pro according to Pro Football Focus. Huff finished the season with 94 tackles, 4 sacks, 3 forced fumbles, and 3 interceptions.

==== 2011 season ====
On opening day of the 2011 NFL season, he remained the starting free safety, playing next to Tyvon Branch, in a win over the Denver Broncos.

On October 9, 2011, against the Houston Texans, Huff intercepted his first pass of the year in the endzone with no time remaining to ensure victory for the Raiders. This was one day after the passing of Raiders' long-time owner Al Davis. On the play, the Raiders' defense only had 10 men on the field. Huff said that Davis “had his hand on that ball.”

==== 2012 season ====
Huff remained starter for the 2012 season at free safety for the Raiders. However, injuries to starting cornerbacks Ron Bartell and Shawntae Spencer forced the team to move Huff to cornerback before Oakland's Week 3 victory against the Pittsburgh Steelers.

Huff was cut by the Oakland Raiders on March 12, 2013.

=== Baltimore Ravens ===
On March 27, 2013, Huff agreed to terms with the Baltimore Ravens on a three-year deal worth $6 million. On October 30, Huff was released by the Baltimore Ravens.

=== Denver Broncos ===
On November 19, 2013, Huff was signed by the Denver Broncos. He started his first game on the roster, but then saw only limited action in 9 other regular season games and 2 playoff games. He went to the Super Bowl with the Broncos, but never saw any playing time in their 43–8 loss to the Seattle Seahawks. It was Huff's final game before retirement. He finished the season as a free agent, and was not signed in the off-season.

== NFL career statistics ==
Year	Team	GP	Tackles				Fumbles			Interceptions					
Year	Team	GP	Cmb	Solo	Ast	Sck	FF	FR	Yds	Int	Yds	Avg	Lng	TD	PD
2006	OAK	16	78	64	14	0.0	0	0	0	0	0	0	0	0	1
2007	OAK	16	85	74	11	1.0	1	0	0	1	4	4	4	0	11
2008	OAK	16	28	23	5	0.0	0	0	0	0	0	0	0	0	5
2009	OAK	16	59	54	5	0.5	0	1	0	3	15	5	10	0	14
2010	OAK	16	94	77	17	4.0	3	0	0	3	32	11	17	0	7
2011	OAK	12	38	32	6	0.0	0	0	0	2	24	12	24	0	4
2012	OAK	16	56	37	19	0.0	0	0	0	2	0	0	0	0	13
2013	BAL	7	6	5	1	0.0	0	0	0	0	0	0	0	0	0
2013	DEN	3	2	2	0	0.0	0	0	0	0	0	0	0	0	0
Career		118	446	368	78	5.5	4	1	0	11	75	7	24	0	55

== Coaching career ==
In 2016, Huff joined Tom Herman's staff at Texas and served as assistant defensive backs coach. He later moved to the position of assistant director of player development.

== See also ==
- List of Texas Longhorns football All-Americans
- List of Oakland Raiders first-round draft picks
