= Jacoby Ford =

American gridiron football player (born 1987)

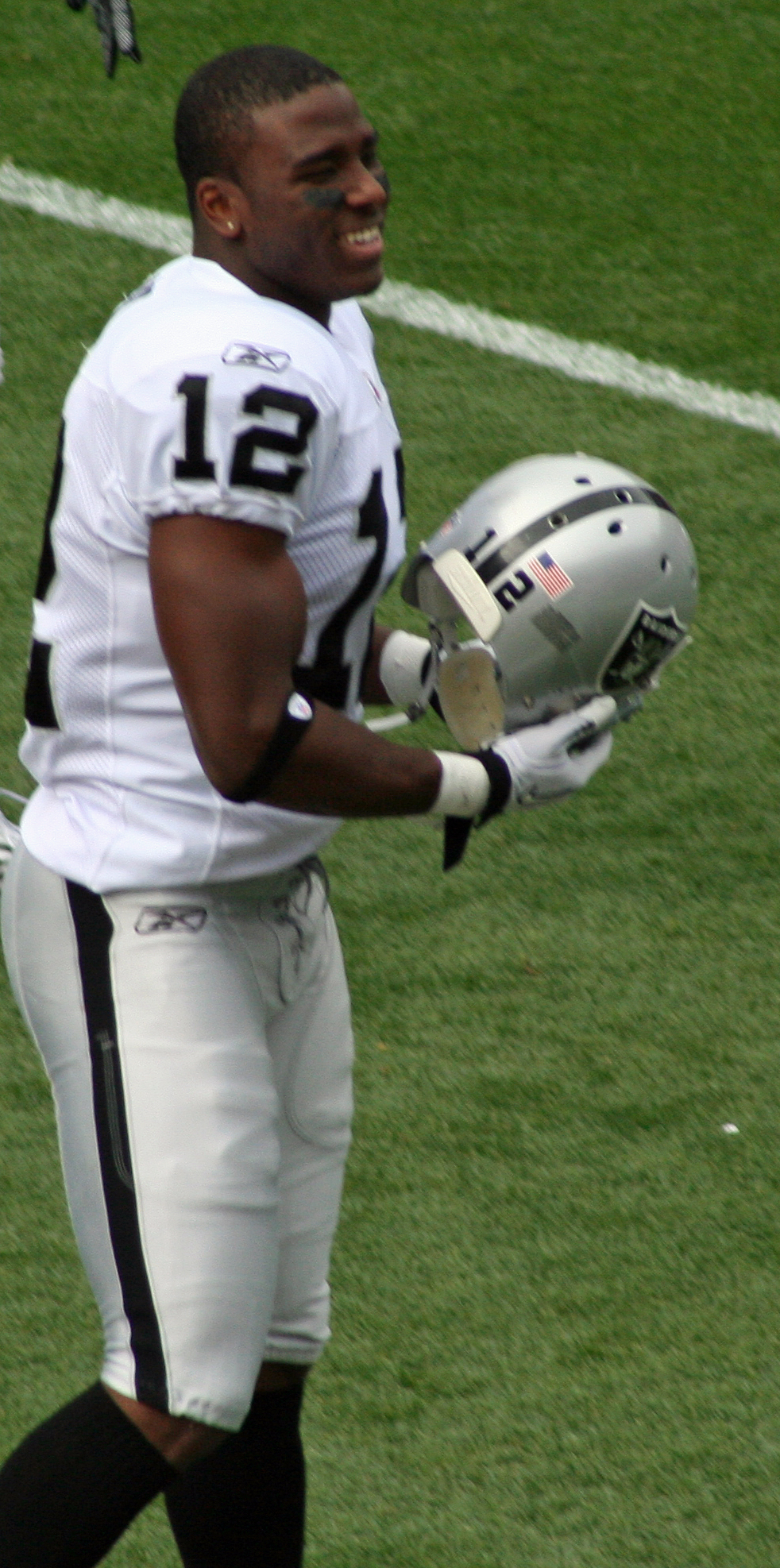
- Ford with the Oakland Raiders in 2010

No. 12
- Positions: Wide receiver, return specialist

Personal information
- Born: July 27, 1987 (age 39); West Palm Beach, Florida, U.S.
- Listed height: 5 ft 9 in (1.75 m)
- Listed weight: 185 lb (84 kg)

Career information
- High school: Cardinal Newman (West Palm Beach)
- College: Clemson (2006–2009)
- NFL draft: 2010: 4th round, 108th overall pick

Career history
- Oakland Raiders (2010–2013); New York Jets (2014)*; Tennessee Titans (2015)*; Edmonton Eskimos (2016)*; Montreal Alouettes (2016)*; Saskatchewan Roughriders (2017–2018)*
- * Offseason or practice squad member only

Career NFL statistics
- Receptions: 57
- Receiving yards: 848
- Rushing attempts: 19
- Rushing yards: 201
- Return yards: 1,951
- Total touchdowns: 9
- Stats at Pro Football Reference

Jacoby Ford (born July 27, 1987) is an American former professional football player who was a wide receiver and return specialist. He was selected by the Oakland Raiders in the fourth round of the 2010 NFL draft. He was also an accomplished track and field athlete. He played college football as a wide receiver and return specialist for the Clemson Tigers at Clemson University, where he competed in sprinting events. During his stint in the NFL, Ford was widely regarded as one of the fastest players in the league. He has one of the top 100 meter times by NFL players.

Ford has been the WR coach at West Boca Raton High School since 2023. Previously, he was a WR coach at Cardinal Newman, where he attended as a high schooler.

Ford received the 2022 Palm Beach County Legends Award and was inducted into the Palm Beach County Sports Hall of Fame in 2024.

== Early life ==
His brother, Davy Ford, played football at Florida State. Jacoby attended Cardinal Newman High School in West Palm Beach, Florida, where he earned two letters in football and one in track. As a senior, he recorded 22 receptions for 550 yards and ten touchdowns. He was named the Palm Beach County All-Star Game most valuable player and a second-team all-state player.

In 2005, he attended preparatory school at the Fork Union Military Academy in Fork Union, Virginia. There he recorded seven kick returns for touchdowns, 57 receptions for 1,254 yards and nine touchdowns, and 12 rushing attempts for 306 yards and three touchdowns. At the Fork Union Military Academy combine, he reportedly ran the 40-yard dash in 4.126 seconds. Rivals.com ranked him the number-17 prep school player in the nation and called him the "fastest player on the East Coast". The head coach John Schuman called him "the fastest player ever at Fork Union", a school which has produced 87 NFL draft picks and two Heisman Trophy winners.

Ford was recruited by Clemson, Florida, Michigan State, Virginia, Virginia Tech, and West Virginia.

== College career ==
Ford enrolled at Clemson University, where he majored in sociology. In 2006 as a true freshman, he saw action in 12 of 13 games. He recorded 15 receptions for 187 yards and two touchdowns, and eight rushing attempts for 104 yards, 23 punt returns for 166 yards and one touchdown, and 13 kick returns for 426 yards and one touchdown.

During the 2007 football season, he saw action in eight of 13 games. He recorded 17 receptions for 310 yards and four touchdowns, 14 rushing attempts for 172 yards, 18 punt returns for 108 yards, and eight kick returns for 211 yards. His season ended early when he suffered a broken ankle against Maryland.

In 2008, he saw action in all 13 games. He recorded 55 receptions for 710 yards and four touchdowns, 18 rushing attempts for 96 yards, 21 punt returns for 62 yards, and 17 kick returns for 313 yards.

Prior to the 2009 season, the NFL Draft Scout ranked Ford as the seventh out of 310 available wide receiver prospects for the 2010 NFL draft.

In the Tigers' 40–24 victory over the Florida State Seminoles on November 7, 2009, Ford and C. J. Spiller became the greatest all-purpose duo in NCAA history (a record previously held by Marshall Faulk and Darnay Scott of San Diego State).

=== Track and field ===
Ford was the 2005 Florida state 100-meter dash champion reportedly with a time of 10.32 seconds (he ran a wind assisted 10.21 on another occasion), and 200-meter dash champion with a time of 21.18 seconds.

During 2007, he was named the Atlantic Coast Conference (ACC) Indoor Freshman of the Year. In the 60-meter dash, he set an ACC record, and the national best for the year, at 6.52 seconds. Ford was also named the Southeast Region Indoor Track Athlete of the Year, and he was awarded National Collegiate Athletic Association (NCAA) All-American, All-East Region, and All-ACC honors.

In February 2009, at the Virginia Tech Elite Meet, Ford ran a 6.51-second 60-meter dash, which was one-hundredth of a second shy of the NCAA Championship meet record. In March, he won the 60-meter dash at the NCAA Indoor Track and Field Championships. During the track season, he was again named an NCAA All-American, All-East Region, and All-ACC athlete with a fastest time of 10.01.

Personal bests

Event	Time (seconds)	Venue	Date
60 meters	6.51	Blacksburg, Virginia	February 28, 2009
100 meters	10.01	Fayetteville, Arkansas	June 10, 2009
200 meters	20.88	Coral Gables, Florida	April 18, 2009

== Professional career ==
Pre-draft measurables
Height	Weight	Arm length	Hand span	40-yard dash	10-yard split	20-yard split	20-yard shuttle	Three-cone drill	Vertical jump	Broad jump	Bench press
5 ft 8 7/8 in (1.75 m)	186 lb (84 kg)	30 1/2 in (0.77 m)	9 1/4 in (0.23 m)	4.28 s	1.48 s	2.50 s	4.44 s	7.00 s	33.5 in (0.85 m)	9 ft 7 in (2.92 m)	15 reps
All values from NFL Combine

=== Oakland Raiders ===
On April 24, Ford was selected by the Oakland Raiders in the fourth round of the 2010 NFL draft with the 108th pick overall. He had 6 receptions for 148 yards and also returned a kickoff 94 yards for a touchdown against the Kansas City Chiefs on November 7, 2010. This was his career-best receiving total. Ford was a pivotal weapon against the Chiefs recording 148 receiving yards, 47 yards of which came on a pass from Jason Campbell to set up Sebastian Janikowski for the 33-yard field goal to beat the Kansas City Chiefs 23-20 in overtime. For his spectacular play in Week 9 against Kansas City, Ford was voted as the Pepsi NFL Rookie of the Week. Ford was named the AFC Special Teams Player of the Month for November 2010. He had a 94-yard touchdown on a kickoff return against the Kansas City Chiefs and a 101-yard return for a score against the Miami Dolphins, the latter the third longest in club history. On December 26, 2010, Ford returned the opening kickoff for 100 yards against the Indianapolis Colts, going end-to-end in 11 seconds. Ford also holds the Raiders record for the most kickoff returns for a touchdown in a season at 3. During the Week 6 game of the 2011 season, Ford set the Raiders franchise record for the most kickoffs returned for touchdowns in franchise history with 4, after his 101-yard kick off return for a touchdown against the Cleveland Browns. In the offseason of 2014 the Raiders decided to not offer Ford a new contract.

=== New York Jets ===
Ford was signed by the New York Jets on April 1, 2014. He was released on August 24.

=== Tennessee Titans ===
The Tennessee Titans signed Ford to a futures contract on January 14, 2015. He signed a one-year, $660,000 contract but was waived as a part of the final cuts on September 5, 2015.

=== Edmonton Eskimos ===
On February 19, 2016, he was signed by the Edmonton Eskimos of the CFL. On June 19, 2016, Ford was released as a part of Edmonton's final roster cuts.

=== Montreal Alouettes ===
After recovering from an injured hamstring, he was signed to the Alouettes' practice roster on July 8, 2016.

=== Saskatchewan Roughriders ===
Ford signed with the Saskatchewan Roughriders of the Canadian Football League for the 2017 season. He was released on April 25, 2018.

=== NFL statistics ===
Year	Team	Games	Receptions	Targets	Reception Yards	Yards per Reception	Longest Reception	Receiving Touchdowns	First Downs	Fumbles	Lost Fumbles
2010	OAK	16	25	53	470	18.8	52	2	19	0	0
2011	OAK	8	19	33	279	14.7	41	1	14	2	1
2013	OAK	14	13	24	99	7.6	22	0	5	1	1
Total	Total	38	57	110	848	14.9	52	3	38	3	2
