= Hiram Eugene =

American football player (born 1980)

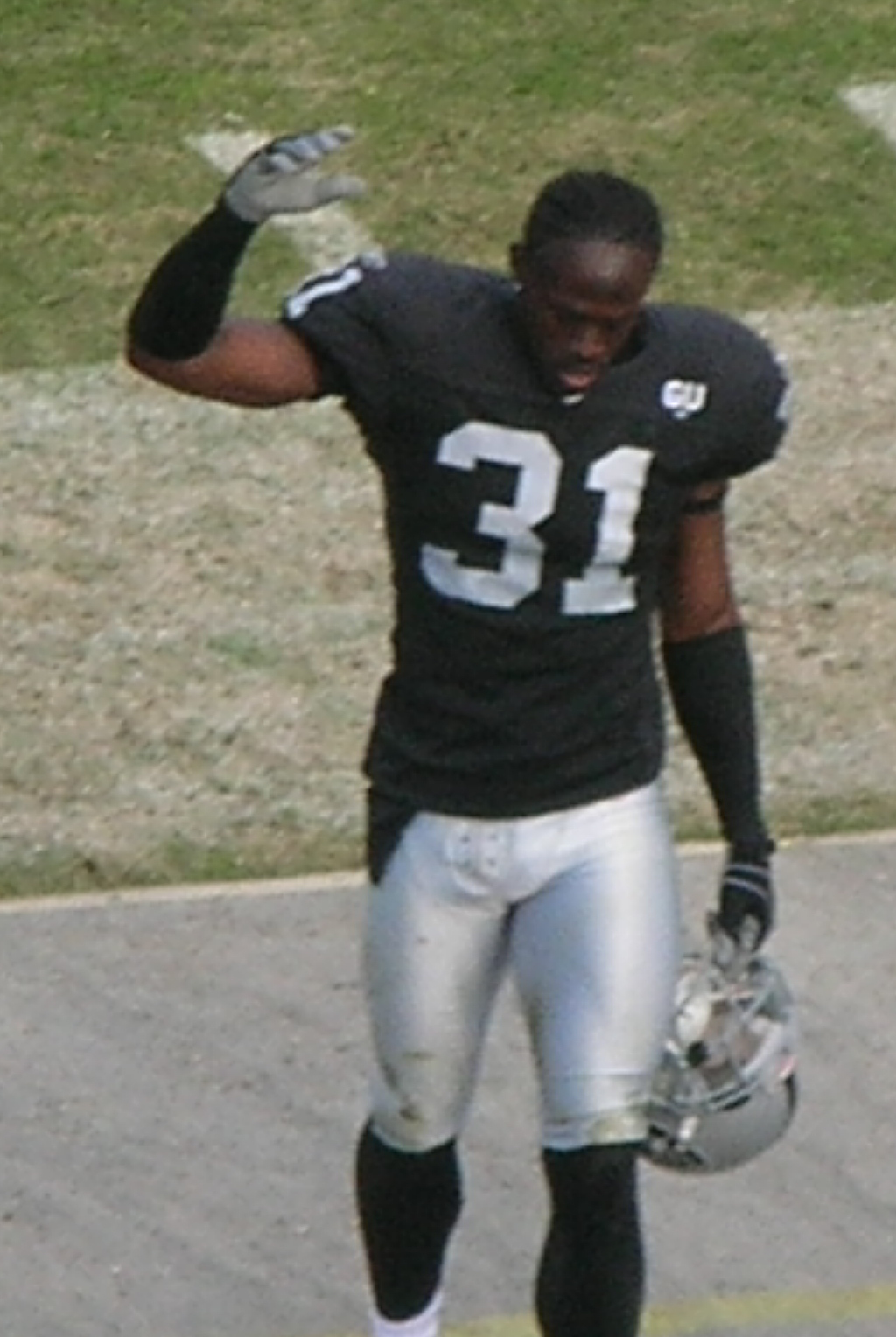
- Eugene with the Oakland Raiders in 2008

No. 31
- Position: Safety

Personal information
- Born: November 24, 1980 (age 45); Lafayette, Louisiana, U.S.
- Listed height: 6 ft 2 in (1.88 m)
- Listed weight: 200 lb (91 kg)

Career information
- High school: Jeanerette (LA)
- College: Louisiana Tech
- NFL draft: 2005: undrafted

Career history
- Oakland Raiders (2005–2011); → Berlin Thunder (2006)

Career NFL statistics
- Total tackles: 153
- Forced fumbles: 2
- Fumble recoveries: 4
- Pass deflections: 6
- Interceptions: 1
- Stats at Pro Football Reference

Hiram Eugene (born November 24, 1980) is an American former professional football player who was a safety in the National Football League (NFL). He was signed by the Oakland Raiders as an undrafted free agent in 2005 and played for the team for six seasons. He played college football for the Louisiana Tech Bulldogs.

== College career ==
Eugene attended Louisiana Tech University for two years and was a student and a letterman in football. In football, as a senior, he recorded 29 tackles and a sack.

== Professional career ==
Eugene went undrafted and signed with the Oakland Raiders practice squad in 2005. In 2007, Eugene was named the starter at safety after Stuart Schweigert played ahead.

In 2008, after Michael Huff was benched for poor tackling, Eugene was named the starter.

On March 9, 2011, Eugene signed a four-year contract keeping him with the Raiders. He dislocated his hip in a pre-season game against the Arizona Cardinals and was required to get surgery. As a result, he was then placed on injured reserve and missed the entire 2011 season

With another three years on his contract, the Raiders released Eugene on March 9, 2012.

== NFL career statistics ==
Legend
| **Bold** | Career high |

| Year | Team | Games | | Tackles | | | | | Interceptions | | | | | Fumbles | | | |
| Year | Team | GP | GS | Cmb | Solo | Ast | Sck | TFL | Int | Yds | TD | Lng | PD | FF | FR | Yds | TD |
|---|---|---|---|---|---|---|---|---|---|---|---|---|---|---|---|---|---|
| 2007 | OAK | **16** | 5 | 31 | 22 | 9 | 0.0 | 0 | 0 | 0 | 0 | 0 | 0 | 0 | 0 | 0 | 0 |
| 2008 | OAK | **16** | **10** | **57** | **46** | **11** | 0.0 | 0 | 0 | 0 | 0 | 0 | **3** | **1** | 0 | 0 | 0 |
| 2009 | OAK | 14 | 4 | 43 | 38 | 5 | 0.0 | 0 | **1** | 0 | 0 | 0 | **3** | 0 | 1 | 0 | 0 |
| 2010 | OAK | 14 | 0 | 22 | 21 | 1 | 0.0 | 0 | 0 | 0 | 0 | 0 | 0 | **1** | **3** | 0 | 0 |
| | | 60 | 19 | 153 | 127 | 26 | 0.0 | 0 | 1 | 0 | 0 | 0 | 6 | 2 | 4 | 0 | 0 |
