= Bruce Campbell (gridiron football) =

American football player (born 1988)

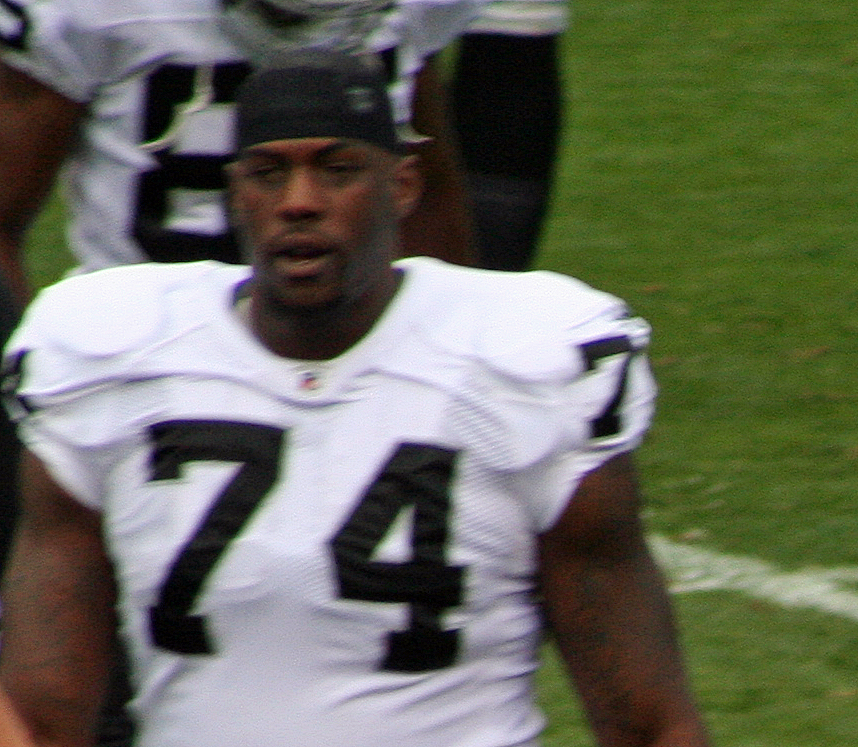
- Campbell with the Oakland Raiders in 2010

No. 69, 73, 74
- Position: Offensive tackle

Personal information
- Born: May 25, 1988 (age 38); Hamden, Connecticut, U.S.
- Listed height: 6 ft 6 in (1.98 m)
- Listed weight: 320 lb (145 kg)

Career information
- High school: Hyde Leadership (Hamden)
- College: Maryland
- NFL draft: 2010: 4th round, 106th overall pick

Career history
- Oakland Raiders (2010–2011); Carolina Panthers (2012–2013); New York Jets (2014)*; Toronto Argonauts (2015); Saskatchewan Roughriders (2016–2017)
- * Offseason or practice squad member only

Career NFL statistics
- Games played: 19
- Stats at Pro Football Reference

Bruce Campbell (born May 25, 1988) is an American former professional football player who was an offensive tackle in the National Football League (NFL) and Canadian Football League (CFL). He played college football for the Maryland Terrapins and was selected by the Oakland Raiders in the fourth round of the 2010 NFL draft.

He was also a member of the Carolina Panthers, New York Jets, Toronto Argonauts, and Saskatchewan Roughriders.

== Early life ==
Campbell is the son of the late former Providence College basketball great Bruce "Soup" Campbell. Bruce originally attended Hyde Leadership School in New Haven, Connecticut, where he was a four-year letterman and never missed a game during his career. He played defensive end all four years and started at that spot and offensive tackle his last two years. Campbell had 50 tackles, including 4.5 quarterback sacks, while blocking two PATs and one punt as a junior, and recorded 70 tackles, including six sacks, two forced fumbles and one fumble recovery his senior season in 2005. He subsequently earned PrepStar All-American honors.

Considered a four-star recruit by Rivals.com, Campbell was ranked as the No. 17 offensive tackle prospect in 2006. He chose Maryland over Michigan State, Nebraska, and Virginia. However, before enrolling at Maryland, Campbell spent a preparation year at Hargrave Military Academy.

== College career ==
In his true freshman season at Maryland in 2007, Campbell appeared in five games at left tackle, including one start against Clemson when injuries hit the Terrapins' offensive line.

Campbell played in all 13 games in 2008, and saw action as a reserve at left tackle in the first six contests before starting at that spot the last seven. He was part of an offensive line that enabled Da'Rel Scott (1,133) to become the seventh Terp back, and first since Chris Downs in 2002, to gain over 1,000 rushing yards. In week 7 of the season, Campbell earned ACC Lineman of the Week honors for his performance against Wake Forest.

== Professional career ==
On December 18, 2009, Campbell announced his decision to enter the 2010 NFL draft.

Pre-draft measurables
Height	Weight	Arm length	Hand span	40-yard dash	10-yard split	20-yard split	20-yard shuttle	Three-cone drill	Vertical jump	Broad jump	Bench press
6 ft 6 3/8 in (1.99 m)	314 lb (142 kg)	36 1/4 in (0.92 m)	10 1/2 in (0.27 m)	4.85 s	1.71 s	2.84 s	4.69 s	7.58 s	32.0 in (0.81 m)	8 ft 5 in (2.57 m)	34 reps
All values from NFL Combine

=== Oakland Raiders ===
Campbell was selected by the Oakland Raiders in the fourth round (106th overall) of the 2010 NFL draft, despite many draft analysts, such as Mel Kiper Jr. and Scott Wright, who thought he would be selected in the top 10. He was reunited with former Maryland teammate Darrius Heyward-Bey. Before training camp started former head coach Tom Cable moved Campbell inside to play right guard on the Raiders' offensive line. On July 21, 2011, Campbell confirmed that he would be moving back outside to play his native position offensive tackle on the Raiders' offensive line under former head coach Hue Jackson's power blocking scheme. He never started any of his 14 games with Oakland.

=== Carolina Panthers ===
Campbell was acquired by the Carolina Panthers on March 30, 2012 in a trade that sent RB Mike Goodson to the Oakland Raiders. On August 24, 2013, he was waived/injured by the Panthers.

=== Washington Redskins ===
On March 12, 2014, Campbell signed a one-year deal with the Washington Redskins. However, his deal was voided on March 13, 2014 after he failed his team physical.

=== New York Jets ===
The New York Jets signed Campbell on August 5, 2014. He was released on August 23, 2014.

=== Toronto Argonauts ===
On March 20, 2015, Campbell signed with the Toronto Argonauts of the Canadian Football League.

=== Saskatchewan Roughriders ===
Campbell was acquired by the Saskatchewan Roughriders of the Canadian Football League via a trade with the Toronto Argonauts on February 10, 2016, only to be soon followed by his retirement from the CFL on May 2, 2016. He was released on February 14, 2017. When Campbell regained the urge to play football, he re-signed with the Roughriders on June 23, 2017. On August 13, 2017, Campbell made his debut with Saskatchewan starting at left tackle. He was released on February 13, 2018.
