= Tyvon Branch =

American football player (born 1986)

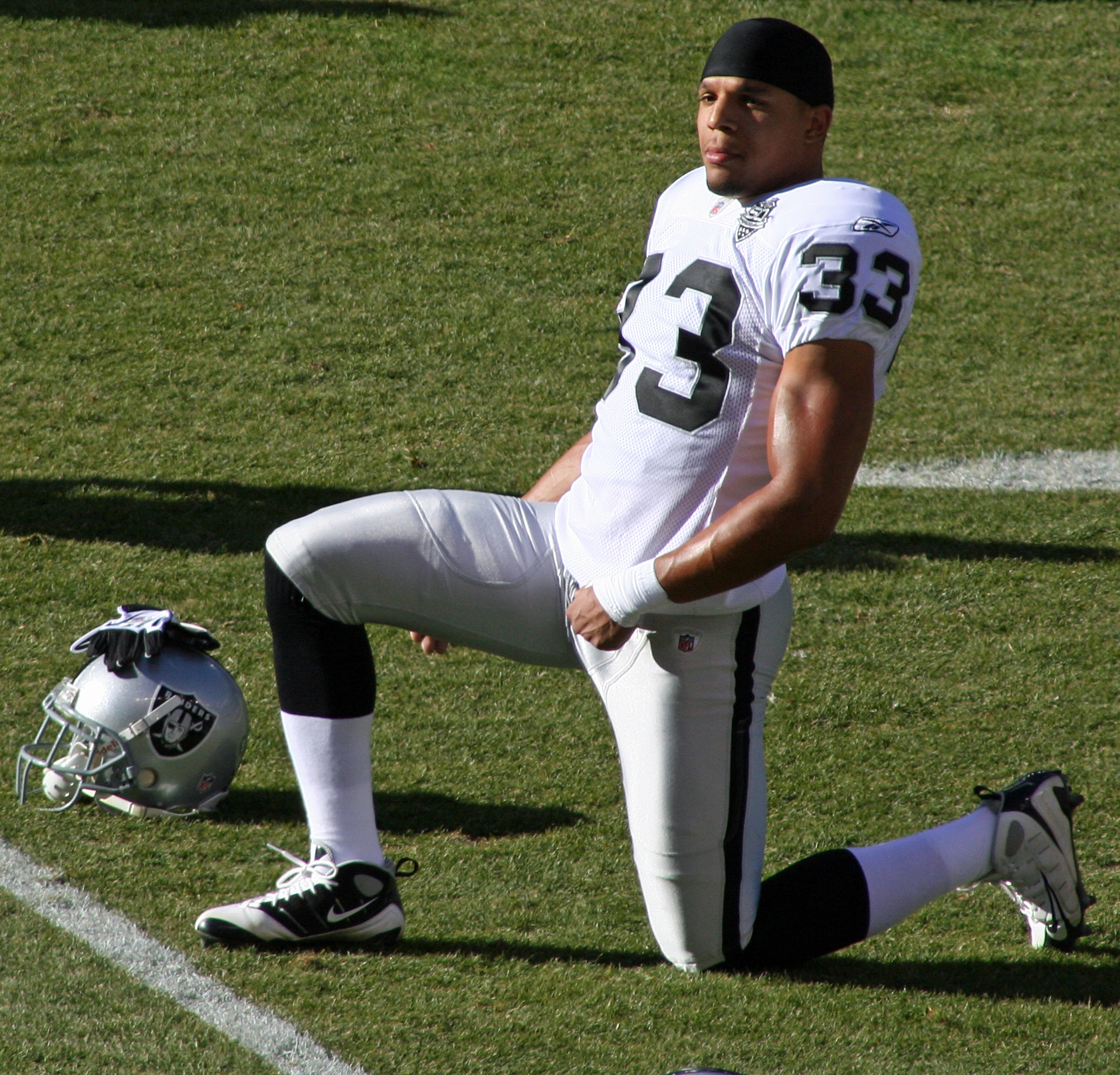
- Branch with the Oakland Raiders in 2009

No. 33, 27
- Position: Safety

Personal information
- Born: December 11, 1986 (age 39); Syracuse, New York, U.S.
- Listed height: 6 ft 0 in (1.83 m)
- Listed weight: 210 lb (95 kg)

Career information
- High school: Cicero – North Syracuse (Cicero, New York)
- College: Connecticut
- NFL draft: 2008: 4th round, 100th overall pick

Career history
- Oakland Raiders (2008–2014); Kansas City Chiefs (2015); Arizona Cardinals (2016–2017)

Awards and highlights
- Second-team All-Big East (2007)

Career NFL statistics
- Total tackles: 615
- Sacks: 9.0
- Forced fumbles: 4
- Fumble recoveries: 5
- Interceptions: 5
- Defensive touchdowns: 3
- Stats at Pro Football Reference

Tyvon A. Branch (born December 11, 1986) is an American former professional football player who was a safety in the National Football League (NFL). He was selected by the Oakland Raiders in the fourth round of the 2008 NFL draft, and also played for the Kansas City Chiefs and Arizona Cardinals. He played college football for the Connecticut Huskies.

== Early life ==
Branch was born in Syracuse, New York. He played youth football as a member of the Sherman Park Bulldogs, winning two Pop Warner NY State championships. He was a two-sport athlete in high school playing football and running track, first at Nottingham before transferring to Cicero-North Syracuse. In football, he played running back for the Cicero Northstars. In track, Branch won the 2004 All-State Championships and was named Gatorade Track Athlete of the Year as a senior.

== College career ==
After high school graduation, Branch committed to the University of Connecticut in 2004, where he played free safety as a member of the UConn Huskies during his freshman and sophomore seasons. In his junior season in 2006, he was assigned to play cornerback.

Branch played in all 48 games during his time at UConn, playing as a member of special teams during the early phase of his college career before he was assigned to secondary postings. Branch mostly distinguished himself in kick returns earning 2nd-team all-conference accolades in his senior season. Branch and the Huskies played in two championships including the Hula Bowl.

== Professional career ==
Pre-draft measurables
Height	Weight	Arm length	Hand span	40-yard dash	10-yard split	20-yard split	20-yard shuttle	Vertical jump	Broad jump	Bench press
5 ft 11 3/8 in (1.81 m)	204 lb (93 kg)	31 in (0.79 m)	8 3/8 in (0.21 m)	4.31 s	1.47 s	2.49 s	4.40 s	38.0 in (0.97 m)	10 ft 0 in (3.05 m)	19 reps
All values from NFL Combine/Pro Day

=== Oakland Raiders ===
The Oakland Raiders selected Branch in the fourth round (100th overall) of the 2008 NFL draft. The Raiders chose to draft Branch not only by his skills as a corner, but also his importance as a return specialist, due to the departure of all-time return leader Chris Carr. During his rookie season on September 14, 2008, Branch intercepted Kansas City Chiefs quarterback Damon Huard for his first career interception. Branch earned his first career start in the 2009 season opener on September 14 in a Monday night game against the San Diego Chargers, but was placed on season-ending injured reserve on November 5 with a shoulder injury.

He went on to have a breakout season for the Raiders in 2009 as the starting strong safety in all 16 games, finishing with 98 unassisted tackles and 26 assists, two forced fumbles, and a sack. He had his best game of the year in a win over the heavily favored Bengals with 12 tackles and a forced fumble. During the 2010 NFL season, he again started in all 16 games for an 8-8 team, recording 81 unassisted tackles and 23 assists.

In March 2012, the Raiders placed a franchise tag on Branch. On July 14, 2012, Branch signed a four-year, $26.6 million contract with the Raiders. On November 9, Branch was fined $15,750 for unnecessary roughness against the Tampa Bay Buccaneers.

=== Kansas City Chiefs ===
On March 10, 2015, Branch signed a one-year contract with the Kansas City Chiefs.

=== Arizona Cardinals ===
On March 9, 2016, Branch signed a two-year contract with the Arizona Cardinals worth $8 million with $5 million guaranteed until 2018. He was placed on injured reserve on October 4, 2016, with a groin injury. He was activated off injured reserve on December 2, 2016, prior to Week 13. He was placed back on injured reserve on December 13, 2016, after re-injuring his groin.

Branch entered the 2017 as the Cardinals' starting strong safety. During Thursday Night Football against the Seattle Seahawks on November 9, 2017, Branch suffered a torn ACL, ending his 2017 season.

== NFL career statistics ==
Year	Team	Games		Tackles				Interceptions				Fumbles			
Year	Team	GP	GS	Comb	Solo	Ast	Sack	PD	Int	Yards	TD	FF	FR	Yards	TD
2008	OAK	8	0	10	8	2	0.0	1	1	36	0	0	1	0	0
2009	OAK	16	16	124	98	26	1.0	8	0	0	0	2	0	0	0
2010	OAK	16	16	103	80	23	4.0	2	1	15	0	1	2	76	1
2011	OAK	16	16	109	80	29	1.0	4	1	0	0	0	1	0	0
2012	OAK	14	14	94	74	20	0.0	3	1	11	0	0	0	0	0
2013	OAK	2	2	5	4	1	1.0	3	0	0	0	0	0	0	0
2014	OAK	3	3	30	23	7	1.0	1	0	0	0	0	0	0	0
2015	KAN	16	1	43	35	8	1.0	4	1	38	1	0	1	73	1
2016	ARI	6	5	28	25	3	0.0	4	0	0	0	0	0	0	0
2017	ARI	9	9	69	54	15	0.0	6	0	0	0	1	0	0	0
Career		106	82	615	481	134	9.0	33	5	100	1	4	5	149	2

== Personal life ==
After undergoing season-ending surgery, Branch retired from football in 2017. He lives with his family in his hometown of Syracuse, New York. Upon retiring, Branch devoted time to charitable work including distributing food and clothing to families in need. He co-founded a free youth camp called Central New York (CNY) Football Academy. In 2021, Branch was inducted into the Greater Syracuse Sports Hall of Fame.
