= Louis Murphy =

American football player (born 1987)

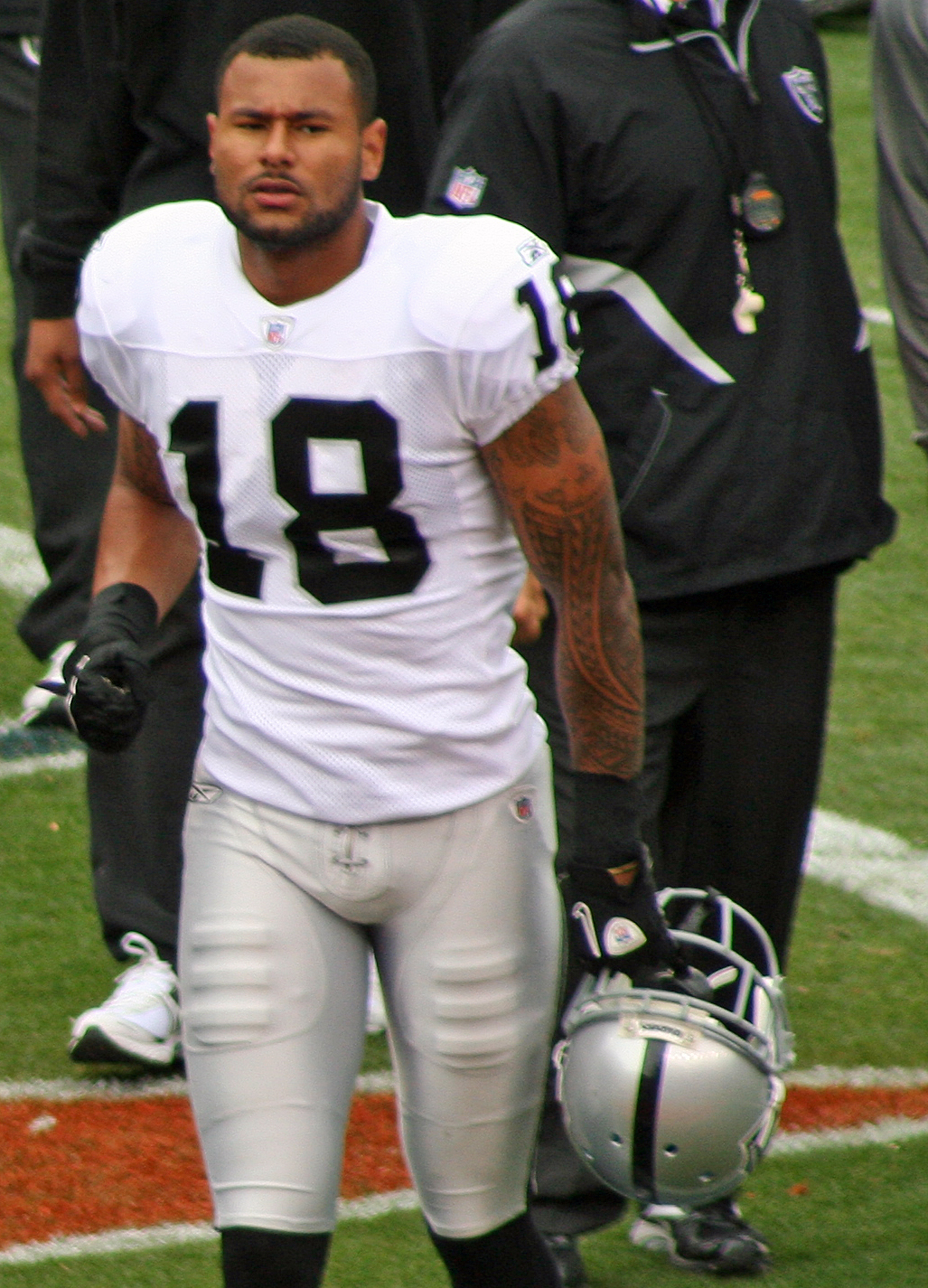
- Murphy with the Oakland Raiders in 2010

No. 18, 83
- Position: Wide receiver

Personal information
- Born: May 11, 1987 (age 39); St. Petersburg, Florida, U.S.
- Listed height: 6 ft 2 in (1.88 m)
- Listed weight: 200 lb (91 kg)

Career information
- High school: Lakewood (St. Petersburg)
- College: Florida (2005–2008)
- NFL draft: 2009: 4th round, 124th overall pick

Career history
- Oakland Raiders (2009–2011); Carolina Panthers (2012); New York Giants (2013); Tampa Bay Buccaneers (2014–2016); San Francisco 49ers (2017); Orlando Apollos (2019)

Awards and highlights
- 2× BCS national champion (2006, 2008)

Career NFL statistics
- Receptions: 170
- Receiving yards: 2,443
- Receiving touchdowns: 11
- Stats at Pro Football Reference

Louis Morris Murphy Jr. (born May 11, 1987) is an American former professional football player who was a wide receiver in the National Football League (NFL). He played college football for the Florida Gators and was a member of two BCS National Championship teams. The Oakland Raiders selected him in the fourth round of the 2009 NFL draft, and he also played for the Carolina Panthers, New York Giants, Tampa Bay Buccaneers, and San Francisco 49ers.

== Early life ==
Murphy was born in St. Petersburg, Florida in 1987, of mixed Samoan and African-American descent. As a teenager, he completed the requirements to be an Eagle Scout. Murphy attended Lakewood High School in St. Petersburg, where he played for the Lakewood Spartans high school football team. In addition to playing quarterback and wide receiver for the Spartans football team, he was also a power forward for the basketball team, and anchored the 4x100 and 4x400-meter relay events for the track team—winning the state championship as a sophomore, with times of 41.59 seconds and 3:24.07 minutes, respectively. Following his senior football season in 2005, he was ranked as the thirty-seventh best wide receiver in the country by Rivals.com.

== College career ==
Murphy accepted an athletic scholarship to attend the University of Florida in Gainesville, Florida, where he played wide receiver for coach Urban Meyer's Florida Gators football team from 2005 to 2008. As a freshman in 2005, he mostly played on special teams. During his sophomore season in 2006, he didn't play much, but he did score his first touchdown reception from freshman quarterback Tim Tebow against the LSU Tigers.

Murphy earned a spot on the 2007 starting roster during spring practice, and became one of the top receivers on the team. After the end of the regular season, he had 36 catches for 544 yards and five touchdowns.

As a senior team captain in 2008, Murphy led the team in receiving yards (655) and ranked second in receptions (38) and average receiving yards per game (46.8), averaging 17.2 yards per catch; he was also the recipient of the Gators' Fergie Ferguson Award. He surpassed the 1,000 career-receiving yards mark with 54 yards in the Gators' victory over South Carolina. Murphy extended his streak of consecutive games with a reception to twenty-seven, and scored his final college touchdown on a 20-yard pass in the first quarter of the Gators' 24–14 BCS National Championship Game victory over the Oklahoma Sooners. Murphy had knee surgery following the season.

Murphy also competed for the Florida Gators men's track and field team, posting a personal best of 6.36 seconds in the 55 meters.

He graduated from the University of Florida with a bachelor's degree in 2008.

== Professional career ==
Pre-draft measurables
| Height | Weight | 40-yard dash | 10-yard split | 20-yard split | 20-yard shuttle | Three-cone drill | Bench press |
|---|---|---|---|---|---|---|---|
| 6 ft 3 in (1.91 m) | 203 lb (92 kg) | 4.32 s | 1.48 s | 2.58 s | 4.45 s | 6.95 s | 12 reps |
All values from Florida Pro Day.

=== Oakland Raiders ===
Murphy was chosen in the fourth round of the 2009 NFL draft by the Oakland Raiders. He played for the Raiders from 2009 through 2011. He made his NFL debut on Monday Night Football against the San Diego Chargers on September 14, 2009, and caught a 56-yard touchdown pass from JaMarcus Russell. In 2009, Murphy caught a touchdown pass that helped the Raiders overcome the Cincinnati Bengals. Later in 2009, Murphy again led his team to a victory over the Pittsburgh Steelers by grabbing an 11-yard touchdown pass from Bruce Gradkowski with twenty-five, seconds left in the game that put the Raiders up 27–24.

Murphy's role in the offense decreased over time seeing time as a rotational player in the Raiders offense.

=== Carolina Panthers ===
On July 23, 2012, Murphy was traded to the Carolina Panthers. With the Panthers, he recorded 25 receptions for 336 yards and one touchdown. It was his second season in which he played all 16 games.

=== New York Giants ===
On March 16, 2013, Murphy signed a one-year contract with the New York Giants. Giants general manager Jerry Reese, said, "I think he's going to add another dimension to our offense. We have a scout named Jeremiah Davis and he talks about guys being a knife. This guy is a knife. This guy can take the top off your defense. He's an interesting guy. He gives us a different dimension in our offense. If we have the same guys, if we have Hakeem Nicks back healthy and we have Victor Cruz, back, this guy gives you a deep threat that we haven't had. We haven't had a guy who can run like this guy."

=== Tampa Bay Buccaneers ===
On March 26, 2014, Murphy signed with the Tampa Bay Buccaneers. They released him the day before the season opener on September 6, 2014, to make room for rookie Brandon Dixon. He was re-signed September 23 and played against the Steelers on September 28 (including a crucial 41-yard reception on the Bucs' final drive leading to a touchdown and a win). At the conclusion of the 2014 season, Murphy proved to be valuable as a third receiver, primarily in the slot. Despite some injuries and issues with the team's low-scoring offense, Murphy compiled 31 catches for 308 yards and two touchdowns.

On December 26, 2014, Murphy signed a three-year contract extension with Tampa Bay through the 2017 season. He was placed on the team's injured reserve on October 27, 2015 after suffering a torn ACL.

Murphy began the 2016 season on PUP to continue his recovery from his torn ACL. He sustained another injury while practicing in an attempt to return in 2016 and was released from PUP on November 29, 2016.

=== San Francisco 49ers ===
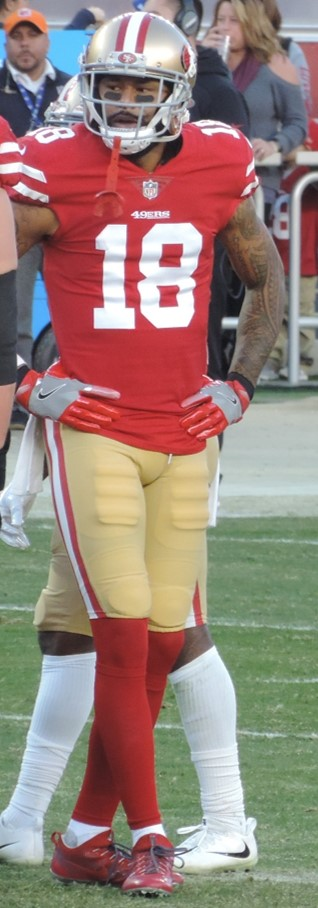
Murphy with the 49ers in 2017

On July 31, 2017, Murphy signed with the San Francisco 49ers. He was released on September 1, 2017. He was re-signed by the 49ers on November 6, 2017. On November 26, 2017, Murphy caught his first touchdown pass on the season from quarterback Jimmy Garoppolo, who also threw his first touchdown pass as a 49er since being traded from the New England Patriots.

=== Orlando Apollos ===
Murphy signed with the Orlando Apollos of the Alliance of American Football (AAF) for the 2019 season.

== Personal life ==
Murphy is cousins with former Florida and New England Patriots running back Mike Gillislee.

On April 12, 2017, Murphy was arrested for having possession of a loaded gun at the Tampa International Airport. A Glock 23 pistol was discovered in Murphy's backpack, loaded with 11 round of ammunition. Murphy did not have a concealed weapons permit, and was released from jail on a $2,000 bond.

== See also ==
- List of Florida Gators in the NFL draft
