= 2006 Notre Dame Fighting Irish football team =

American college football season

2006 Notre Dame Fighting Irish football

Sugar Bowl, L 14–41 vs. LSU
- Conference: Independent

Ranking
- Coaches: No. 19
- AP: No. 17
- Record: 10–3
- Head coach: Charlie Weis (2nd season)
- Offensive coordinator: Michael Haywood (2nd season)
- Offensive scheme: Pro-style
- Defensive coordinator: Rick Minter (4th season)
- Base defense: Multiple 4–3
- MVP: Brady Quinn
- Captains: Brady Quinn; Travis Thomas; Tom Zbikowski
- Home stadium: Notre Dame Stadium

2006 NCAA Division I FBS independents football records
	Conf.			Overall
Team	W		L	W		L
No. 17 Notre Dame %		–		10	–	3
Navy		–		9	–	4
Army		–		3	–	9
Temple		–		1	–	11
% – BCS at-large representative; Rankings from AP Poll

The 2006 Notre Dame Fighting Irish football team was an American football team that represented the University of Notre Dame as an independent during the 2006 NCAA Division I FBS football season. In their second year under head coach Charlie Weis, the Irish compiled a 10–3 record, outscored opponents by a total of 403 to 310, and were ranked No. 17 in the final AP poll and No. 19 in the final Coaches Poll. The Irish had been ranked No. 2 in the preseason AP poll, but they dropped in the poll after losing to No. 11 Michigan, No. 3 USC, and No. 4 LSU, the latter in the Sugar Bowl.

Quarterback Brady Quinn won the Maxwell Award and finished third in the Heisman Trophy voting. The team's statistical leaders included Quinn (3,426 passing yards, 37 passing touchdowns), running back Darius Walker (1,267 rushing yards), and wide receivers Jeff Samardzija (78 receptions for 1,017 yards) and Rhema McKnight (90 points scored).

The team played its home games at Notre Dame Stadium in South Bend, Indiana.

== Schedule ==
Date	Time	Opponent	Rank	Site	TV	Result	Attendance
September 2	8:00 p.m.	at Georgia Tech	No. 2	Bobby Dodd Stadium; Atlanta, GA (rivalry)	ABC	W 14–10	56,680
September 9	3:30 p.m.	No. 19 Penn State	No. 4	Notre Dame Stadium; Notre Dame, IN (rivalry)	NBC	W 41–17	80,795
September 16	3:30 p.m.	No. 11 Michigan	No. 2	Notre Dame Stadium; Notre Dame, IN (rivalry)	NBC	L 21–47	80,795
September 23	8:00 p.m.	at Michigan State	No. 12	Spartan Stadium; East Lansing, MI (rivalry)	ABC	W 40–37	80,193
September 30	2:30 p.m.	Purdue	No. 12	Notre Dame Stadium; Notre Dame, IN (rivalry)	NBC	W 35–21	80,795
October 7	2:30 p.m.	Stanford	No. 12	Notre Dame Stadium; Notre Dame, IN (rivalry)	NBC	W 31–10	80,795
October 21	2:30 p.m.	UCLA	No. 10	Notre Dame Stadium; Notre Dame, IN	NBC	W 20–17	80,795
October 28	12:00 p.m.	at Navy	No. 11	M&T Bank Stadium; Baltimore, MD (rivalry)	CBS	W 38–14	71,851
November 4	2:30 p.m.	North Carolina	No. 11	Notre Dame Stadium; Notre Dame, IN (rivalry)	NBC	W 45–26	80,795
November 11	4:00 p.m.	at Air Force	No. 9	Falcon Stadium; Colorado Springs, CO (rivalry)	CSTV	W 39–17	49,367
November 18	2:30 p.m.	Army	No. 6	Notre Dame Stadium; Notre Dame, IN (rivalry)	NBC	W 41–9	80,795
November 25	8:00 p.m.	at No. 3 USC	No. 6	Los Angeles Memorial Coliseum; Los Angeles, CA (rivalry)	ABC	L 24–44	91,800
January 3, 2007	8:00 p.m.	vs. No. 4 LSU	No. 11	Louisiana Superdome; New Orleans, LA (Sugar Bowl)	FOX	L 14–41	77,781
Rankings from AP Poll released prior to the game; All times are in Eastern time

== Rankings ==
Ranking movements Legend: ██ Increase in ranking ██ Decrease in ranking т = Tied with team above or below ( ) = First-place votes
	Week															
Poll	Pre	1	2	3	4	5	6	7	8	9	10	11	12	13	14	Final
AP	2 (10)	4 (8)	2 (3)	12	12	12	9	10	11	11	9	6	6	12	11	17
Coaches	3T (9)	5T (2)	3 (1)	13	14	12	8	8	10	10	8	5	6	12	11	19
Harris	Not released				12	12	9	10	10	10	8	5	5	10	11T	Not released
BCS	Not released							8	9	9	9	5	5	10	11	Not released

== Preseason ==
After finishing 9–3 in 2005, Notre Dame began the 2006 season ranked No. 3 in the USA Today Coaches Poll and No. 2 in the Associated Press Poll. These were Notre Dame's highest preseason rankings since 1994, when they occupied the same positions in both polls.

=== Roster changes ===
The Irish lost nine former starters to graduation and the NFL after the 2005 season, including five offensive starters, three defensive, and placekicker D.J. Fitzpatrick. However, the Irish returned many key players such as quarterback Brady Quinn, wide receiver Jeff Samardzija, running back Darius Walker, and safety Tom Zbikowski from the previous year's squad, Notre Dame received much pre-season hype as a possible national championship contender.

=== Award candidates ===
Quinn also entered the season as one of the favorites to win the Heisman Trophy. Along with Quinn, the following Fighting Irish football players were named to national award watchlists for the 2006 season:

- Brady Quinn – Maxwell Award, Walter Camp Award
- Jeff Samardzija – Maxwell Award, Walter Camp Award
- Darius Walker – Maxwell Award
- Tom Zbikowski – Nagurski Award, Bednarik Award
- Ryan Harris – Outland Trophy
- Victor Abiamiri – Ted Hendricks Award
- John Sullivan – Dave Rimington Trophy

Notre Dame's three players on the Maxwell Award watchlist tied Miami, Michigan, Ohio State, and USC for most nominees.

== Game summaries ==
=== Georgia Tech ===
#2 Notre Dame at Georgia Tech

Team	1	2	3	4	Total
• Notre Dame	0	7	7	0	14
Georgia Tech	7	3	0	0	10

- Date: September 2
- Location: Bobby Dodd Stadium, Atlanta, GA

On September 2, Notre Dame defeated Georgia Tech, 14–10, in Atlanta. Georgia Tech scored first on a four-yard touchdown pass from quarterback Reggie Ball to Calvin Johnson at the end of the first quarter. Georgia Tech's defense continued to menace third-ranked Notre Dame's offense, while a Travis Bell field goal increased Tech's lead to 10–0. It was the last time Georgia Tech would score, however. Notre Dame orchestrated a 14-play, 80-yard drive right before the half, punctuated by a five-yard rushing touchdown from Brady Quinn, to close the score to 10–7 at halftime. Coach Charlie Weis adjusted at halftime and began the second half determined to establish the Irish running game. The move paid off when running back Darius Walker scored on a 13-yard run on Notre Dame's first drive of the second half. Both defenses tightened, as the teams traded punts. With Notre Dame facing a fourth-and-one at the Georgia Tech 47-yard line with 1:10 left to play in the game, Georgia Tech appeared to be on the verge of getting the ball back with a chance to win the game. However, Weis gambled and elected to go for the first down rather than punt. Weis' gamble was rewarded when Quinn picked up the yard on a quarterback sneak, giving Notre Dame the first down and enabling them to run the clock out for the 14–10 victory.

Quinn completed 23 of 38 passes for 246 yards. Quinn also rushed for a touchdown, but was held without a passing touchdown. Walker rushed 22 times for 99 yards and one touchdown, while Rhema McKnight was Notre Dame's leading receiver with eight receptions for 108 yards.

Both teams had a player who became better known in a different sport. Notre Dame wide receiver Jeff Samardzija played professional baseball for the Chicago Cubs, and Georgia Tech defensive lineman Joe Anoa'i signed with WWE and became a multi-time world champion as Roman Reigns.

=== Penn State ===
#19 Penn State at #5 Notre Dame

Team	1	2	3	4	Total
Penn St	0	0	3	14	17
• Notre Dame	3	17	14	7	41

- Date: September 9
- Location: Notre Dame Stadium, South Bend, IN

On September 9, Penn State came to Notre Dame for the first time since the 1992 Snow Bowl game. The game began as a defensive battle with Notre Dame scoring the only points of the first quarter on a field goal. However, the Irish offense picked up in the second quarter as quarterback Brady Quinn threw two touchdown passes (his first of the season) to Jeff Samardzija and Rhema McKnight. With another field goal, Notre Dame led, 20–0, at the half. In the third quarter, Penn State quarterback, Anthony Morelli fumbled the ball during a lateral pass as he ran an option play; Tom Zbikowski picked up the fumble and ran it for a touchdown. Penn State score its first points later in the quarter on a 28-yard field goal by Kevin Kelly, but the Irish scored again on a one-yard touchdown run by Travis Thomas. In the fourth quarter, Quinn threw a third touchdown pass to Darius Walker, Morelli threw his only touchdown of the day to Deon Butler, and Penn State running back Daryll Clark ran a five-yard touchdown with time running out. The game ended with Notre Dame winning, 41–17.

=== Michigan ===
#11 Michigan at #2 Notre Dame

Team	1	2	3	4	Total
• Michigan	20	14	6	7	47
Notre Dame	7	7	0	7	21

- Date: September 16
- Location: Notre Dame Stadium, South Bend, IN

The Michigan Wolverines came to Notre Dame having lost three of the last four games to the Irish and having not won at Notre Dame since 1994, the year before Lloyd Carr became head coach. The game began with Notre Dame receiving the ball on the opening kickoff. On the second play, Brady Quinn's pass was intercepted by Prescott Burgess who ran it back for a 21-yard touchdown to put Michigan ahead, 7–0. After a punt on Notre Dame's next drive Michigan quarterback Chad Henne threw an interception to Chinedum Ndukwe which was returned to the four-yard line to set up a Brady Quinn touchdown pass to Ashley McConnell. Michigan scored the next 27 points with three touchdown passes by Henne to Mario Manningham and a run by Mike Hart. The Irish would score with a touchdown pass to Jeff Samardzija before halftime to leave the score 34–14. In the third quarter, Michigan kicked two more field goals, one after Quinn's second interception in the game. Quinn threw a touchdown in the fourth quarter to Rhema McKnight to end the Irish scoring. The Wolverines ended any chance of a comeback when, while being sacked, Quinn's fumble was returned for a 54-yard touchdown by LaMarr Woodley. The game ended as a Wolverine blowout of 47–21, giving Lloyd Carr his first win in Notre Dame.

=== Michigan State ===
#12 Notre Dame at Michigan State

Team	1	2	3	4	Total
• Notre Dame	0	14	7	19	40
Michigan St	17	14	6	0	37

- Date: September 23
- Location: Spartan Stadium, East Lansing, MI

The September 23 game between Notre Dame and Michigan State in East Lansing, Michigan, was preceded by pregame hype. After Michigan State's victory the prior year, Spartan players planted a flag in Notre Dame's field. Michigan State officials said the incident occurred because Notre Dame did not present the Megaphone Trophy after the game, and players needed to celebrate. Notre Dame officials stated that they never presented rivalry trophies after games, but sent them later in the week. More controversy was sparked when it was reported that Irish head coach Charlie Weis told a group of Notre Dame alumni during the summer of 2006 that he would never again lose to Michigan State as head coach. Weis denied it, but the Spartans used it as motivation. Added to these controversies was that 2006 marks the 40th anniversary of the Game of the Century between the teams. Before the game, Michigan State brought back players from that team and retired Bubba Smith's jersey. The controversies continued into the game when a late hit on Michigan State's quarterback by the Notre Dame bench lead to a scuffle between the teams. Charlie Weis claimed a Michigan State player slapped him in the face. This claim brought a penalty from the officials, and after the game John L. Smith implied that Weis had lied about a slap that could not be seen on any replay footage.

The game was played in windy and rainy conditions for most of the night. Notre Dame won the coin toss and took the ball as Charlie Weis normally does. Michigan State chose to play with the wind at their backs for the first quarter. The commentators for the game, especially Bob Davie, questioned Weis' decision, believing that the windy conditions would affect play significantly. It seemed to as Notre Dame was held without a score for the entire first quarter, while the Spartans threw two quick touchdowns, one after a fumble on a punt return by Tom Zbikowski, and added a field goal before having to change sides. In the second quarter Notre Dame switched to a no-huddle offense with worked to confuse the Spartan defense for a drive allowing Brady Quinn to throw a 32-yard touchdown to Rhema McKnight. On their next drive, however, Quinn threw an interception to Ervin Baldwin which was returned for a 19-yard touchdown to give the Spartans a 24–7 lead. Quinn would throw another touchdown to Jeff Samardzija and Spartan quarterback Drew Stanton added another touchdown pass to Kerry Reed to end the half with the Spartans leading 31–14.

The second half began with a defensive stop by the Irish which allowed Quinn to throw a third touchdown of 62 yards to John Carlson to cut the Spartan lead to 10. However, later in the quarter Michigan State's Jehuu Caulcrick ran 30 yards for a touchdown. The Spartans failed in a two-point conversion attempt leaving the score 37–21 at the end of the third quarter. In the fourth quarter, Michigan State had the ball at the Notre Dame 42-yard line and looked to score again. However a series of miscues and holding penalties halted the Spartan drive and forced them to punt. Quinn took advantage and threw for a fourth touchdown to Jeff Samardzija. The Irish attempted a two-point conversion, but failed, leaving the score at 37–27 with eight minutes left in the game. On the ensuing drive, a Stanton fumble was recovered by the Irish on the Spartan 24-yard line. Aided by a pass interference call on third down and 25-yards to go, Quinn threw his fifth touchdown pass of the evening to Rhema McKnight. The extra point was missed leaving the Spartans ahead 37–33. On the next drive, Stanton threw an interception to Terrail Lambert which was returned 23-yards for the go-ahead touchdown. The Irish led, 40–37, with almost three minutes left. Stanton led the Spartans to the Notre Dame 44-yard line before throwing a pass which was tipped twice and which Terrail Lambert would catch off of the back of a Spartan wide receiver to end the game, with the Irish winning 40–37.

=== Purdue ===
Purdue at #12 Notre Dame

Team	1	2	3	4	Total
Purdue	7	7	0	7	21
• Notre Dame	14	14	7	0	35

- Date: September 30
- Location: Notre Dame Stadium, South Bend, IN

On September 30, the Purdue Boilermakers came to Notre Dame undefeated, but still underdogs to the Irish. Notre Dame started the scoring with a 70-yard opening drive capped by an 11-yard touchdown run by George West, Notre Dame's first opening-drive touchdown of the year. Purdue tied the game later in the quarter with a seven-yard run by Kory Sheets. The Irish completed another long drive with a 14-yard touchdown run by Darius Walker to put them in the lead, 14–7, at the end of the first quarter. Brady Quinn threw his first touchdown of the game to Rhema McKnight for six yards halfway through the second quarter. With a little over a minute remaining before halftime, the Irish faked a field goal and Jeff Samardzija, the holder, ran for a five-yard touchdown. However, 30 seconds later, Purdue quarterback Curtis Painter threw an 88-yard touchdown pass to Selwyn Lymon to put the halftime score at 28–14, in favor of Notre Dame.

The only score in the third quarter was a 12-yard touchdown pass from Quinn to McKnight to give the Irish a 21-point lead. In the fourth quarter, Curtis Painter threw a nine-yard touchdown to Selwyn Lymon for a final score of 35–21. At the end of the game, Lymon had 238 receiving yards, the second most yards ever for a Purdue receiver and the most receiving yards ever against the Irish. The teams combined for 955 total yards, and only 242 yards were from rushing. Darius Walker ran for 146 of those yards himself.

=== Stanford ===
Stanford at #12 Notre Dame

Team	1	2	3	4	Total
Stanford	3	0	0	7	10
• Notre Dame	7	7	10	7	31

- Date: October 7
- Location: Notre Dame Stadium, South Bend, IN

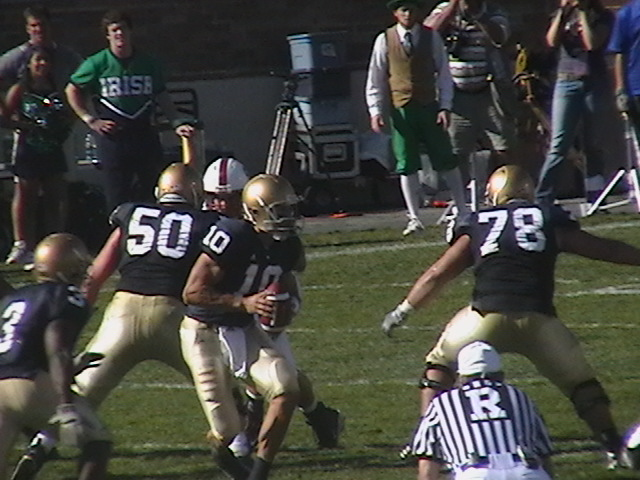
Brady Quinn taking a snap against Stanford

On October 7, the Stanford Cardinal came to Notre Dame winless and big underdogs. However, in the first half the Cardinal kept the game closer than expected. The Irish started the game with a seven-minute, 91-yard drive, ending with an eight-yard touchdown pass from Brady Quinn to Jeff Samardzija. The Cardinal's opening possession took advantage of a porous Irish defense which was without linebacker Travis Thomas and safety Tom Zbikowski, both out with injuries. Stanford drove to the Irish three-yard line before being forced to kick a field goal after a sure touchdown was dropped. The Cardinal took six minutes off the clock on the drive, and the first quarter ended with Notre Dame winning 7–3. The second quarter was uneventful until the Notre Dame's final drive, which began with just over two minutes left in the half. Quinn led a 72-yard drive which ended with a 16-yard touchdown pass to Rhema McKnight to put the Irish up 14–3 at halftime.

In the third quarter, the Irish began to pull away. Darius Walker ran for a 32-yard touchdown, his longest run of the season, to give the Irish an 18-point lead. Later in the quarter, Carl Gioia added a 32-yard field goal to put the Irish up, 24–3, at the end of the third quarter. In the fourth quarter, the Cardinal used a trick play to get on the scoreboard again. On a toss to running back Anthony Kimble, Kimble threw a 57-yard touchdown to a wide-open Kelton Lynn. The score brought the Cardinal within 14. Later in the quarter, Quinn threw his third touchdown of the game to tight end John Carlson for a final score of 31–10 in favor of the Irish.

=== UCLA ===
UCLA at #10 Notre Dame

Team	1	2	3	4	Total
UCLA	0	14	0	3	17
• Notre Dame	7	3	3	7	20

- Date: October 21
- Location: Notre Dame Stadium, South Bend, IN

After trailing UCLA for most of the game, Brady Quinn was able to help Notre Dame to a last minute comeback that may have saved Notre Dame's BCS hopes, as well as Quinn's Heisman candidacy.

Notre Dame got on the board first when Quinn capped a 7-play, 44-yard drive with a two-yard touchdown pass to Jeff Samardzija. UCLA would roar back, however, scoring fourteen unanswered second quarter points before Notre Dame would add a field goal as the quarter expired. Down 14–10 heading into the locker room at halftime, the situation looked grim for the Irish, who were unable to deal with the relentless UCLA defense.

Notre Dame would cut the Bruins' lead to one when Carl Gioia capped a long, 14-play, 60-yard drive with a 33-yard field goal near the end of the third quarter. UCLA would answer with a field goal of its own midway through the fourth quarter to push its lead to 17–13.

The UCLA defense continued to frustrate the Notre Dame offense, and it appeared the Bruins had the game won after stopping Notre Dame on a fourth-and-1 attempt from the UCLA 35 with 2:25 remaining in the game. UCLA, though, was unable to run the clock out. UCLA was forced to punt after running three straight running plays that netted 6 yards. UCLA was only able to take 1:19 off the clock with its three running plays.

After Aaron Perez's 59-yard punt resulted in a touchback, Notre Dame took over on its own 20-yard line with :55 remaining in the game, needing a touchdown to avoid its second loss of the season. Rather than blitz Quinn, UCLA head coach Karl Dorrell opted to rush only his four down linemen. UCLA was unable to generate any kind of a pass rush against the Notre Dame offensive line, allowing the masterful Quinn to pick apart the Bruin defense with surgical precision. On the first play of the drive, Quinn dropped back deep, but was initially unable to find an open man. Quinn started to roll out to his right before he spotted Samardzija along the right sideline and fired a 21-yard strike that moved the Irish to the Notre Dame 41-yard line. Quinn picked up 14 yards on the next play with a completion to wide receiver David Grimes, bringing Notre Dame to the UCLA 45.

Before the Bruins knew what hit them, Notre Dame had taken the lead. After taking a five step drop, Quinn pump-faked and began to roll to his right in search of an open receiver. Quinn spotted Samardzija open on the right side of the field and delivered a bullet to the Irish receiver. Samardzija caught the ball at the 30-yard line and then jutted towards the middle of the field, weaving in and out of Bruin defenders before momentarily losing his balance after taking a hit from UCLA safety Dennis Keyes near the 15-yard line. Samardzija was quickly able to regain his footing, jumping the final yard into the end zone and scoring the winning touchdown with the ball raised aloft.

The touchdown, which came with just :27 left in the game, was only the third game-winning touchdown in Notre Dame history come with less than :30 remaining in the game, the other two occurring in the 1979 Cotton Bowl Classic and a 1992 game against Penn State.

Quinn finished the game 27 of 45 for 304 yards and 2 touchdowns, thrusting himself back into the forefront of the Heisman race with his late game heroics. With the victory, Notre Dame improved its record to 6–1 on the season.

=== Navy ===
Navy vs. #11 Notre Dame

Team	1	2	3	4	Total
• Notre Dame	10	14	7	7	38
Navy	0	14	0	0	14

- Date: October 28
- Location: M&T Bank Stadium, Baltimore, MD
- Game start: 12:00 p.m. EST

Brady Quinn has put himself back in Heisman contention after making 18 of 25 passes and throwing for 296 yards making 3 TD passes in a game against Navy. He also showed his footwork by taking a TD in from 19 yards out.

The Irish started out their scoring quickly with Carl Gioia hitting a 40-yard FG, 3:15 into the game putting them up 3–0 and ended the 1st quarter with a 36-yard pass from Quinn to WR David Grimes to make it a 10–0 game with 1:32 left.

Navy got back in the game quickly with a 1-yd run by Kaipo-Noa Kaheaku-Enhada to make 10–7 with 11:39 left in the half, but the Irish came back quickly with Travis Thomas running in a ball 16 yards to make it a 17–7 game with 8 min. left in the half. But Kaheaku-Enhada once again got Navy back in the game with another 1-yard run to make 17–14 with 2:43 left in the half giving Navy only a 3 pt deficit. Quinn turned right around and hit hitting Rhema McKnight with a 33-yard pass and his 2nd TD pass with a 1:19 left to give Notre Dame a 24–14 lead heading into halftime.

Quinn continued his dominance in the second half leading 3 strong drives two of them scoring TDs. With 8:10 left in the 3rd, Quinn ran in a TD from 19 yards out to give the Irish a 31–14 lead the drive was helped out by a late hit call on 3rd and 19 that allowed Quinn to make the play. The second drive stalled at the 1 when the Midshipmen's defense held. The third drive however ended with Quinn hitting McKnight with a 6-yard pass and his 2nd TD catch and Quinn's 3rd TD pass with 9:36 left in the game, to give the Irish a 38–14 final.

=== North Carolina ===
North Carolina at #11 Notre Dame

Team	1	2	3	4	Total
North Carolina	7	6	13	0	26
• Notre Dame	14	17	7	7	45

- Date: November 4
- Location: Notre Dame Stadium, South Bend, IN

Notre Dame gets another win and Brady Quinn makes another case for the Heisman Trophy going 23 of 35 for 346 yards and 4 TDs. The game started with Brady Quinn hitting Rhema McKnight for a 7-yd TD pass and giving Notre Dame a 7–0 lead. But UNC came back with Joe Dailey throwing a 12-yd TD pass to Jesse Holley to knot up the score 7–7. But Notre Dame came back with Quinn throwing an 11-yd strike to John Carlson to close out the 1st quarter 14–7. The 2nd quarter started like the 1st with Quinn hitting McKnight for a 14-yd TD pass putting the Irish up 21–7 and Carl Gioia hit a 27-yd kick to make it 24–7 but UNC's Brandon Tate would return the kickoff 90-yds for a TD, the only saving grace being that the XP was blocked making the score 24–13. The half closed out with Tom Zbikowski returning a punt 52 yds for a TD and increasing the lead to 31–13 going into the half.

Joe Dailey would start off the scoring in the second half with a 13-yd pass to Hakeem Nicks but the Irish defense would block another XP attempt making the score 31–19. The Irish would strike back with Quinn hitting Jeff Samardzija with a 42-yd pass to make the score 38–19. UNC would repeat their earlier tandem with Dailey throwing a 72-yd pass to Nicks to cut the deficit to 38–26. But that would be UNC's last hurrah in this game as the Irish defense would prevent anymore scoring and the lone score of the 4th quarter was Darius Walker's 1-yd run to give 45–26 final.

=== Air Force ===
#9 Notre Dame at Air Force

Team	1	2	3	4	Total
• Notre Dame	20	7	6	6	39
Air Force	3	0	7	7	17

- Date: November 11
- Location: Falcon Stadium, Colorado Springs, CO

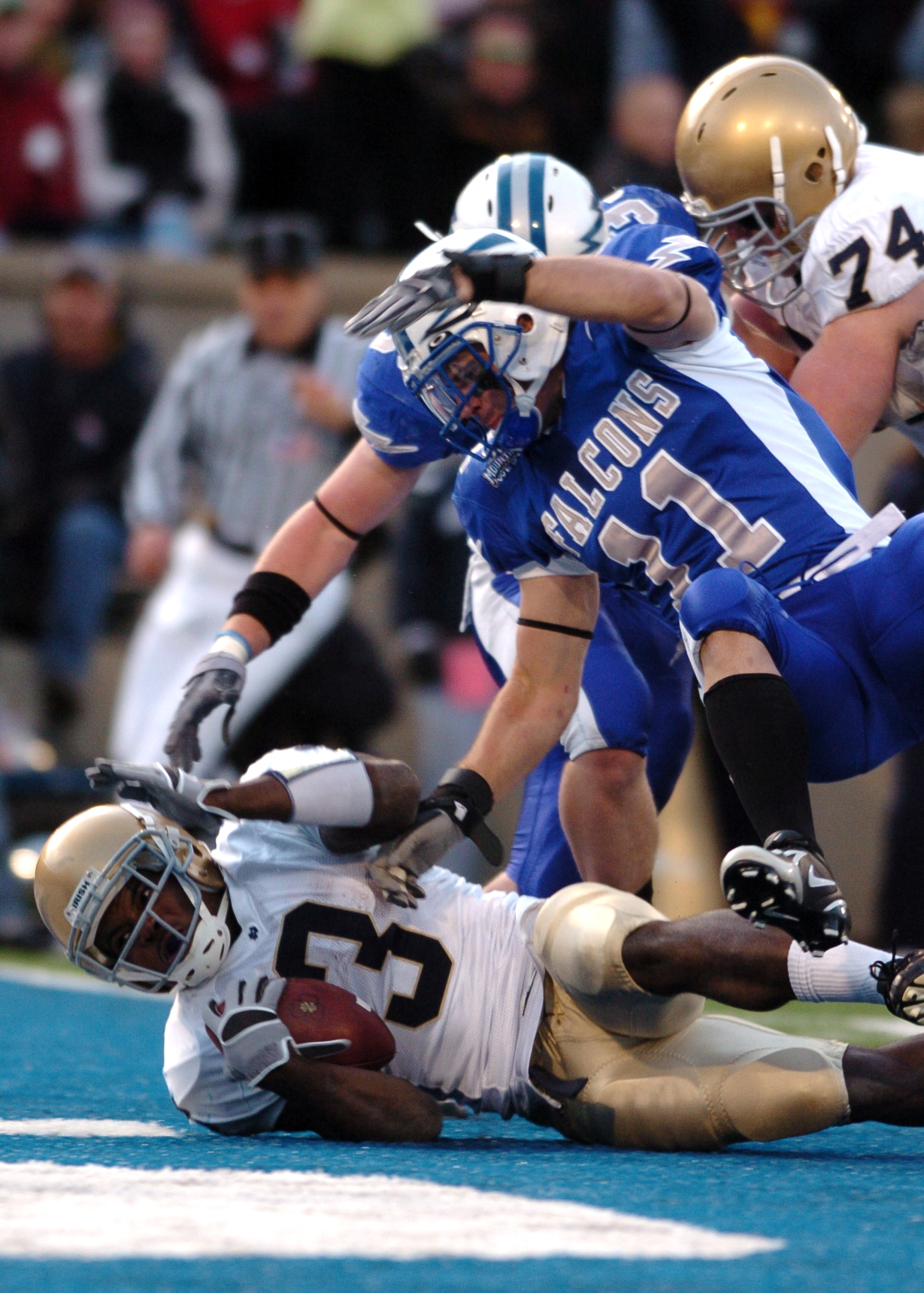
Darius Walker scoring a touchdown against Air Force in the 4th quarter

On November 11, Notre Dame defeated Air Force, 39–17, at Colorado Springs, Colorado. Notre Dame quarterback Brady Quinn threw the first of his four touchdown passes less than a minute into the game, connecting with Jeff Samardzija for 51 yards. Less than five minutes later, Quinn threw a one-yard touchdown pass to John Carlson to put Notre Dame up 14–0. At 8:40 into the game, Air Force got on the board when Zach Sasser kicked a 32-yard field goal. Quinn responded with a 24-yard touchdown pass to Rhema McKnight. Air Force blocked the extra point attempt, and Notre Dame led, 20–3, at the end of the first quarter. In the second quarter, Notre Dame blocked a field goal attempt, and Terrail Lambert returned the blocked kick 76 yards for a touchdown to put Notre Dame ahead, 27–3, at halftime.

With 8:33 left in the third quarter, Quinn threw a 23-yard touchdown pass to Marcus Freeman, but Air Force again blocked Carl Gioia's extra point attempt, putting Notre Dame up 33–3. With 17 seconds left in the third quarter, Air Force quarterback Shaun Carney threw a 12-yard touchdown pass to Beau Suder to make it 33–10. In the fourth quarter, Darius Walker scored on a four-yard run with Gioia missing the extra point attempt, giving Notre Dame a 39–10 lead. Carney then hit Jacobe Kendrick for a seven-yard touchdown to complete the scoring at 39–17.

=== Army ===
Army at #6 Notre Dame

Team	1	2	3	4	Total
Army	3	0	0	6	9
• Notre Dame	0	20	14	7	41

- Date: November 18
- Location: Notre Dame Stadium, South Bend, IN
- Game start: 2:30 p.m. EST

Scoring summary
1	1:46	ARMY	Justin Miller 27-yard field goal	ARMY 3–0
2	14:10	ND	Darius Walker 10-yard run (Carl Gioia kick)	ND 7–3
2	8:15	ND	Jeff Samardzija 16-yard pass from Brady Quinn (kick failed)	ND 13–3
2	1:01	ND	Rhema McKnight 8-yard pass from Brady Quinn (Carl Gioia kick)	ND 20–3
3	13:09	ND	David Grimes recovered fumble in end zone (Carl Gioia kick)	ND 27–3
3	9:46	ND	Rhema McKnight 24-yard pass from Brady Quinn (Carl Gioia kick)	ND 34–3
4	11:00	ND	Darius Walker 7-yard run (Carl Gioia kick)	ND 41–3
4	0:00	ARMY	Tim Dunn 12-yard pass from David Pevoto (no kick)	ND 41–9

In the final home game for the team's senior class, the Irish took the field donning their special green jerseys. The first quarter of the game featured good defense by both teams including a stop on 4th down by the Irish and a pick that led to 3 by Army to give the Black Knights an early 3–0 lead. But in the second quarter the Irish came out firing and less than a minute into the 2nd Brady Quinn handed the ball to Darius Walker and he ran it in 10-yds for the Touchdown making it 7–3 Notre Dame. After a Defensive stop by the Irish they got the ball back and on 9 plays drove down field topping it off with Quinn throwing a 13-yd pass to Jeff Samardzija for the Irish's 2nd TD, but Gioia missed the PAT making the score 13–3 Notre Dame. With just over a minute left in the 1st half Brady Quinn hooked up with Rhema McKnight for an 8-yd touchdown reception and this time Carl Gioia hit the PAT giving Notre Dame a 20–3 lead going into halftime.

The Irish kept up the offensive onslaught to start off the 2nd half, scoring a touchdown when receiver David Grimes recovered teammate Darius Walker's fumble in the endzone to give Notre Dame a 27–3 lead. The next Black Knights drive saw an interception by the Irish which led to a 24-yd pass from Quinn to McKnight for a TD extending their lead to 34–3. 4 minutes into the 4th quarter Notre Dame struck again with Darius Walker taking it in from 8-yds out to make it a 41–3 lead for Notre Dame. The drive started out with great field position due to Michael Richardson's 2nd pick of the day. On the last play of the game with no time left on the clock Army was finally able to make it into the endzone on a 12-yd pass from David Pevoto to Tim Dunn to make it a 41–9 final.

=== USC ===
#6 Notre Dame at #3 USC

Team	1	2	3	4	Total
Notre Dame	3	7	7	7	24
• USC	14	7	7	16	44

- Date: November 25
- Location: Los Angeles Memorial Coliseum, Los Angeles, CA

On November 25, Notre Dame, ranked No. 6, lost to No. 3 USC at the Los Angeles Memorial Coliseum. On the opening drive, Brady Quinn threw a quick 38-yard pass to Rhema McKnight, but the drive stalled, and Notre Dame turned the ball over after Quinn's fourth-down pass fell incomplete in the endzone. USC quarterback John David Booty led the Trojans on a 61-yard drive that ended with a nine-yard touchdown pass to Dwayne Jarrett. After the next Irish drive ended with a punt and a return by the Trojans to the Irish 26-yard line, Booty completed another touchdown pass to Jarrett to put the Trojans ahead, 14–0. On the ensuing Irish drive, Quinn and Darius Walker brought the Irish downfield, allowing Carl Gioia to kick a field goal. The first quarter ended with the Trojans leading, 14–3. In the first drive of the second quarter, Booty led the Trojans to the Irish onr-yard line where he sneaked the ball in for USC's third touchdown. On the ensuing drive for the Irish, on a third down, Quinn scrambled for 59 yards, Notre Dame's longest run of the season, to bring the Irish to the USC 17-yard line. Four plays later, a Darius Walker fumble was recovered by the Trojans. The Irish defense, however, held the Trojans, forcing a punt for the first time. The punt was partially blocked giving the Irish the ball on the USC seven-yard line. On the next play, Quinn threw a touchdown to Marcus Freeman. The next two drives by the Trojans both ended when Booty threw interceptions, but the Irish could not capitalize on either, turning the ball over on downs two more times. The half ended with the Trojans leading 21–10.

The second half began with a USC drive of 65 yards capped with a Chauncey Washington two-yard touchdown run. The only other score of the third quarter came on Notre Dame's second drive of 58 yards, when Quinn hit Rhema McKnight for a two-yard touchdown pass on fourth down. The fourth quarter began with the Trojans driving to a 32-yard field goal by Mario Danelo. After the Irish were held, Booty threw a 43-yard touchdown pass to Jarrett to give the Trojans a 37–17 lead (Danelo missed the extra point). Quinn drove the Irish 78 yards and threw a two-yard touchdown pass to Jeff Samardzija to narrow the Irish deficit to 13 points. Notre Dame's onside kick attempt was recovered by Brian Cushing who ran it back for a touchdown, restoring the Trojans' 20-point lead. Notre Dame's final drive ended on another failed fourth-down attempt, giving the Trojans the 44–24 win.

=== Sugar Bowl ===
#4 LSU vs. #11 Notre Dame
Sugar Bowl

Team	1	2	3	4	Total
Notre Dame	7	7	0	0	14
• LSU	14	7	13	7	41

- Date: January 3
- Location: Louisiana Superdome, New Orleans, LA
- Game weather: indoors (dome)

== Personnel ==
2006 Notre Dame Fighting Irish football team roster
Players
Coaches
Offense

Pos.	#	Name	Class
WR	1	D.J. Hord	So
RB	3	Darius Walker	Jr
QB	4	Demetrius Jones	Fr
WR	5	Rhema McKnight	Sr
WR	7	Craig Cardillo	Sr
QB	10	Brady Quinn	Sr
WR	11	David Grimes	So
QB	12	Zach Frazer	Fr
QB	13	Evan Sharpley	So
QB	17	Dan Gorski	So
WR	19	George West	Fr
WR	21	Barry Gallup Jr.	Fr
WR	23	Chase Anastasio	Sr
WR	24	Brandon Erickson	Jr
RB	25	Munir Prince	Fr
RB	27	John Lyons	Sr
WR	29	Jake Richardville	So
RB	32	Luke Schmidt	Fr
RB	34	James Aldridge	Fr
RB	35	Ashley McConnell	Sr
RB	36	Dex Cure	Fr
RB	37	Junior Jabbie	Jr
WR	38	Nick Possley	Jr
TE	39	Kevin Brooks	Fr
WR	42	David Costanzo	So
RB	44	Asaph Schwapp	So
WR	45	Kris Patterson	So
TE	46	Michael Planalp	So
RB	49	Matt Augustyn	Sr
OL	50	Dan Santucci	Sr
OL	51	Dan Wenger	Fr
OL	55	Eric Olsen	Fr
OL	59	Chris Stewart	Fr
OL	63	Jeff Tisak	So
OL	64	Dan Chervanick	Sr
OL	68	Ryan Harris	Sr
OL	71	Bartley Webb	Fr
OL	72	Paul Duncan	So
OL	73	Matt Carufel	Fr
OL	74	Sam Young	Fr
OL	76	Bob Morton	Sr
OL	77	Michael Turkovich	So
OL	78	John Sullivan	Sr
OL	79	Brian Mattes	Sr
WR	80	Richard Jackson	Fr
WR	81	Darrin Bragg	Jr
WR	82	Robby Parris	Fr
WR	83	Jeff Samardzija	Sr
TE	84	Will Yeatman	Fr
TE	86	Mike Talerico	Jr
TE	87	Marcus Freeman	Sr
TE	88	Konrad Reuland	Fr
TE	89	John Carlson	Sr

Defense

Pos.	#	Name	Class
DB	2	Darrin Walls	Fr
DB	6	Ray Herring	So
DB	8	Raeshon McNeil	Fr
DB	9	Tom Zbikowski	Sr
DB	15	Leo Ferrine	Jr
DB	18	Chinedum Ndukwe	Sr
DB	20	Terrail Lambert	Jr
DB	22	Ambrose Wooden	Sr
DB	23	William David Williams	Jr
DB	24	Leonard Gordon	Fr
DB	26	Wade Iams	Jr
LB	26	Travis Thomas	Sr
DB	27	David Bruton	So
DB	28	Kyle McCarthy	So
DB	29	Jashaad Gaines	Fr
DB	30	Mike Richardson	Sr
DB	31	Sergio Brown	Fr
DB	35	Tim Kenney	Sr
LB	40	Maurice Crum Jr.	Jr
LB	41	Scott Smith	So
LB	42	Kevin Washington	So
DB	43	Mike Anello	So
LB	46	Kyle Charters	Jr
LB	47	Mitchell Thomas	Sr
LB	48	Steve Quinn	So
LB	49	Toryan Smith	Fr
LB	52	Joe Brockington	Sr
LB	53	Morrice Richardson	Fr
LB	54	Anthony Vernaglia	Jr
LB	56	Nick Borseti	Sr
DL	57	Dwight Stephenson Jr.	Sr
DL	60	Casey Cullen	Sr
DL	66	Derek Landri	Sr
DL	69	Neil Kennedy	Jr
DL	75	Chris Frome	Sr
DL	90	John Ryan	Fr
DL	91	Travis Leitko	Sr
DL	92	Derrell Hand	So
DL	93	Paddy Mullen	Fr
DL	94	Justin Brown	Jr
DL	95	Victor Abiamiri	Sr
DL	96	Pat Kuntz	So
DL	97	Kallen Wade	Fr
DL	98	Trevor Laws	Sr
DL	99	Ronald Talley	Jr

Special teams

Pos.	#	Name	Class
P	17	Geoffrey Price	Sr
K	33	Nate Whitaker	Fr
K	39	Ryan Burkhart	Fr
P	43	Eric Maust	Fr
K	45	Carl Gioia	Sr
LS	61	J.J. Jansen	Jr
K	96	Bobby Renkes	Sr

Head coach

- Charlie Weis

Coordinators/assistant coaches

- Michael Haywood – Offensive Coordinator & Running Backs
- Rob Ianello – Receivers Coach & Recruiting Coordinator
- John Latina – Assistant Head Coach (Offense)/Off. Line
- Bill Lewis – Asst. Head Coach (Defense)/Def. Backs
- Rick Minter – Defensive Coordinator & Linebackers
- Jappy Oliver – Defensive Line Coach
- Bernie Parmalee – Tight Ends Coach/Asst. Special Teams
- Brian Polian – Head Special Teams Coach/Ast. Def. Backs
- Peter Vaas – Quarterbacks
- Jeff Burrow – Defensive Graduate Assistant
- Shane Waldron – Offensive Graduate Assistant

Legend

- (C) Team captain
- (S) Suspended
- (I) Ineligible
- Injured
- Redshirt

Roster

=== Recruits ===
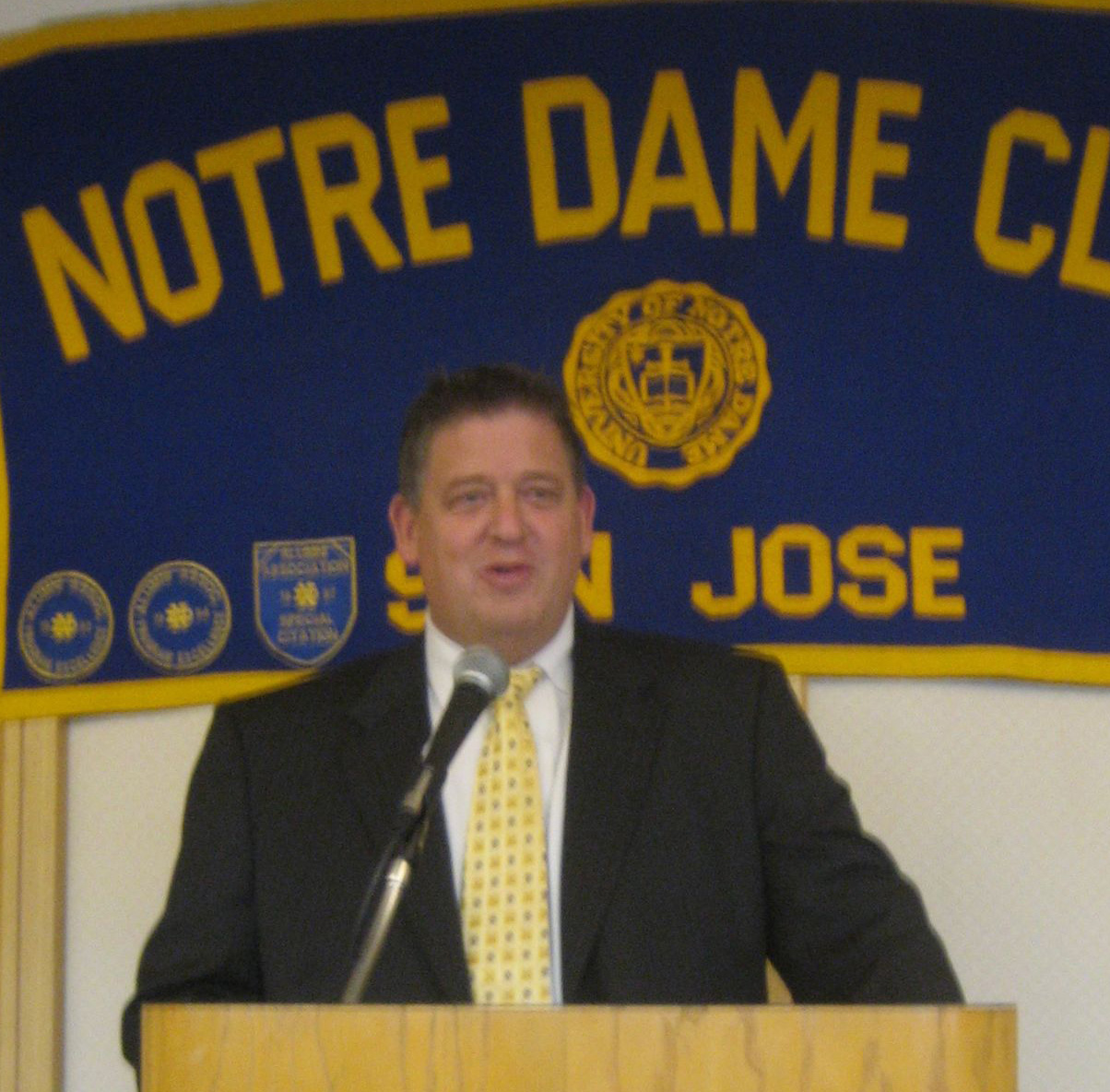
Charlie Weis, Head Coach

In Weis' first full year of recruiting, the Irish signed 28 recruits. The top ten ranked recruiting class, included three five star recruits on offense and 14 four star recruits with eight on offense and six on defense.

College recruiting (2006)
Name	Hometown	School	Height	Weight	40^{‡}	Commit date
James Aldridge; RB	Merrillville, Indiana	Merrillville HS	6 ft 1 in (1.85 m)	215 lb (98 kg)	4.5	May 2, 2005
James Aldridge; RB	Recruit ratings: Scout: Rivals: (84)					
Sergio Brown; DB	Maywood, Illinois	Proviso East HS	6 ft 1 in (1.85 m)	184 lb (83 kg)	4.5	Nov 8, 2005
Sergio Brown; DB	Recruit ratings: Scout: Rivals: (77)					
Ryan Burkhart; K	Nappanee, Indiana	Northwood HS	5 ft 11 in (1.80 m)	185 lb (84 kg)	NA	Sep 6, 2005
Ryan Burkhart; K	Recruit ratings: Scout: Rivals: (80)					
Matt Carufel; OL	Saint Paul, Minnesota	Cretin Derham Hall	6 ft 5 in (1.96 m)	280 lb (130 kg)	5.3	Jan 7, 2006
Matt Carufel; OL	Recruit ratings: Scout: Rivals: (78)					
Zach Frazer; QB	Mechanicsburg, Pennsylvania	Mechanicsburg Area HS	6 ft 4 in (1.93 m)	212 lb (96 kg)	4.81	Apr 14, 2005
Zach Frazer; QB	Recruit ratings: Scout: Rivals: (83)					
Jashaad Gaines; DB	Las Vegas, Nevada	Las Vegas HS	6 ft 0 in (1.83 m)	202 lb (92 kg)	4.67	Sep 20, 2005
Jashaad Gaines; DB	Recruit ratings: Scout: Rivals: (77)					
Barry Gallup; WR	Wellesley, Massachusetts	Wellesley Senior HS	5 ft 11 in (1.80 m)	175 lb (79 kg)	4.4	Apr 11, 2005
Barry Gallup; WR	Recruit ratings: Scout: Rivals: (74)					
Leonard Gordon; DB	Fort Campbell, Kentucky	Fort Campbell HS	5 ft 10 in (1.78 m)	195 lb (88 kg)	4.7	Sep 17, 2005
Leonard Gordon; DB	Recruit ratings: Scout: Rivals: (77)					
Richard Jackson; WR	Clermont, Florida	East Ridge HS	6 ft 2 in (1.88 m)	195 lb (88 kg)	4.4	Nov 17, 2005
Richard Jackson; WR	Recruit ratings: Scout: Rivals: (81)					
Demetrius Jones; QB	Chicago	Morgan Park HS	6 ft 3 in (1.91 m)	192 lb (87 kg)	4.6	Aug 14, 2005
Demetrius Jones; QB	Recruit ratings: Scout: Rivals: (82)					
Raeshon McNeil; DB	Mocksville, North Carolina	Davie County HS	6 ft 0 in (1.83 m)	175 lb (79 kg)	4.4	Aug 15, 2005
Raeshon McNeil; DB	Recruit ratings: Scout: Rivals: (84)					
Paddy Mullen; TE	St. Louis, Missouri	De Smet Jesuit HS	6 ft 5 in (1.96 m)	265 lb (120 kg)	4.8	Apr 23, 2005
Paddy Mullen; TE	Recruit ratings: Scout: Rivals: (40)					
Eric Olsen; OL	Brooklyn, New York	Poly Prep CDS	6 ft 5 in (1.96 m)	300 lb (140 kg)	5.1	Sep 25, 2005
Eric Olsen; OL	Recruit ratings: Scout: Rivals: (76)					
Robby Parris; WR	Cleveland, Ohio	St. Ignatius HS	6 ft 4 in (1.93 m)	185 lb (84 kg)	4.52	Jul 11, 2005
Robby Parris; WR	Recruit ratings: Scout: Rivals: (73)					
Munir Prince; RB	St. Louis, Missouri	De Smet Jesuit HS	5 ft 10 in (1.78 m)	170 lb (77 kg)	4.5	Apr 2, 2005
Munir Prince; RB	Recruit ratings: Scout: Rivals: (76)					
Konrad Reuland; TE	Mission Viejo, California	Mission Viejo HS	6 ft 6 in (1.98 m)	239 lb (108 kg)	4.75	Dec 15, 2005
Konrad Reuland; TE	Recruit ratings: Scout: Rivals: (84)					
Morrice Richardson; LB	Atlanta	Westlake HS	6 ft 2 in (1.88 m)	232 lb (105 kg)	4.6	Nov 15, 2005
Morrice Richardson; LB	Recruit ratings: Scout: Rivals: (76)					
John Ryan; DE	Cleveland, Ohio	St. Ignatius HS	6 ft 5 in (1.96 m)	240 lb (110 kg)	4.7	Jun 14, 2005
John Ryan; DE	Recruit ratings: Scout: Rivals: (80)					
Luke Schmidt; RB	Jasper, Indiana	Jasper HS	6 ft 3 in (1.91 m)	230 lb (100 kg)	4.6	May 27, 2005
Luke Schmidt; RB	Recruit ratings: Scout: Rivals: (82)					
Toryan Smith; LB	Rome, Georgia	Rome HS	6 ft 0 in (1.83 m)	230 lb (100 kg)	4.65	Dec 7, 2005
Toryan Smith; LB	Recruit ratings: Scout: Rivals: (80)					
Chris Stewart; OL	Klein, Texas	Klein HS	6 ft 5 in (1.96 m)	350 lb (160 kg)	5.55	Nov 17, 2005
Chris Stewart; OL	Recruit ratings: Scout: Rivals: (78)					
Kallen Wade; DE	Cincinnati	Withrow HS	6 ft 5 in (1.96 m)	220 lb (100 kg)	4.55	Apr 23, 2005
Kallen Wade; DE	Recruit ratings: Scout: Rivals: (77)					
Darrin Walls; DB	Pittsburgh	Woodland Hills SHS	6 ft 0 in (1.83 m)	176 lb (80 kg)	4.4	Oct 3, 2005
Darrin Walls; DB	Recruit ratings: Scout: Rivals: (82)					
Bartley Webb; OL	Springdale, Arkansas	Springdale HS	6 ft 7 in (2.01 m)	285 lb (129 kg)	5.4	Aug 6, 2005
Bartley Webb; OL	Recruit ratings: Scout: Rivals: (77)					
Daniel Wenger; OL	Fort Lauderdale, Florida	St. Thomas Aquinas HS	6 ft 4 in (1.93 m)	280 lb (130 kg)	5.2	Dec 7, 2005
Daniel Wenger; OL	Recruit ratings: Scout: Rivals: (79)					
George West; WR	Oklahoma City	Northeast HS	5 ft 8 in (1.73 m)	168 lb (76 kg)	4.57	Sep 22, 2005
George West; WR	Recruit ratings: Scout: Rivals: (74)					
Will Yeatman; TE	San Diego	Rancho Bernardo HS	6 ft 6 in (1.98 m)	255 lb (116 kg)	4.85	Dec 14, 2005
Will Yeatman; TE	Recruit ratings: Scout: Rivals: (NA)					
Sam Young; OL	Fort Lauderdale, Florida	St. Thomas Aquinas	6 ft 8 in (2.03 m)	300 lb (140 kg)	5.05	Jan 19, 2006
Sam Young; OL	Recruit ratings: Scout: Rivals: (89)					
Overall recruit ranking: Scout: #5 Rivals: #8
‡ Refers to 40-yard dash; Note: In many cases, Scout, Rivals, 247Sports, On3, and ESPN may conflict in their listings of height, weight and 40 time.; In these cases, the average was taken. ESPN grades are on a 100-point scale.; Sources: "Notre Dame Commit List 2006". Rivals.; "Scout.com Football Recruiting: Notre Dame". Scout.; "2006 Player Commitments – Notre Dame". ESPN.; "Scout.com Team Recruiting Rankings". Scout.; "2006 Team Ranking". Rivals.com.

== Statistics ==
Passing

1. Brady Quinn - 289 of 467 (61.9%) for 3,426 yards, 37 touchdowns, 7 interceptions

Rushing

1. Darius Walker - 1,267 yards on 255 carries, 5.0-yard average, 7 touchdowns
2. James Aldridge - 142 yards on 37 carries, 3.8-yard average, 0 touchdowns

Receiving

1. Jeff Samardzija - 78 receptions for 1,017 yards, 13.0-yard average, 12 touchdowns
2. Rhema McKnight - 67 receptions for 907 yards, 13.5-yard average, 15 touchdowns
3. John Carlson - 47 receptions for 634 yards, 13.5-yard average, 4 touchdowns
4. Darius Walker - 56 receptions for 391 yards, 7.0-yard average, 1 touchdown
5. David Grimes - 26 for 336 yards, 12.9-yard average, 2 touchdowns

Scoring

1. Rhema McKnight - 90 points, 15 touchdowns
2. Jeff Samardzija - 78 points, 13 touchdowns
3. Carl Gioia - 73 points, 49 of 54 PAT, 8 of 13 field goals
4. Darius Walker - 48 points, 8 touchdowns

Tackles

1. Maurice Crum Jr. - 100 total tackles, 47 solo tackles
2. Chinedum Ndukwe - 98 total tackles, 58 solo tackles
3. Tom Zbikowski - 79 total tackles, 44 solo tackles
4. Derek Landri - 65 total tackles, 34 solo tackles
5. Trevor Laws - 62 total tackles, 22 solo tackles
6. Joe Brockington - 59 total tackles, 23 solo tackles
7. Mike Richardson - 55 total tackles, 34 solo tackles

Punting

1. Geoff Price - 50 punts, 45.4-yard average

Punt returns

1. Tom Zbikowski - 16 returns for 144 yards, 9.0-yard average, 1 touchdown

== Awards and honors ==
Quarterback Brady Quinn received numerous awards honors, including the following:

- Quinn won the Maxwell Award as the best all-around player in college football.
- Quinn won the Johnny Unitas Golden Arm Award as the top upperclassman quarterback in college football.
- Quinn finished third in voting for the Heisman Trophy.
- Quinn was selected as the most valuable player on the 2006 Notre Dame football team.
- Quinn was named a finalist for the Davey O'Brien Award.
- Quinn was selected as the Cingular All-American Player of the Year.

Three other Irish players were nominated for postseason awards. Tight end John Carlson was named as a John Mackey Award finalist. Punter Geoff Price was named as a Ray Guy Award semi-finalist, and safety Tom Zbikowski was named as a Jim Thorpe Award semi-finalist.

Sports Illustrated awarded second-team All-America honors to Brady Quinn and gave honorable mention to Jeff Samardzija, Rhema McKnight, John Carlson, and Geoff Price. The AP named Quinn and Samardzija on their second team and Tom Zbikowski on its third team. The Walter Camp Football Foundation named Samardzija and Zbikowski on its second team. Finally, Samardzija was named by the Football Writers Association of America on their first team. Samardzija was also named, for the second time, as a consensus All-American by the NCAA.

Sam Young was named by The Sporting News as a first team freshman All-American.

== 2007 NFL draft ==
In the 2007 NFL draft seven players were taken, including offensive starters Quinn, Ryan Harris and Dan Santucci and defensive starters Victor Abiamiri, Derek Landri, Mike Richardson and Chinedum Ndukwe. Five others also signed contracts with NFL teams, while Samardzija signed a deal with the Chicago Cubs as a baseball pitcher.
