= 2007 Sugar Bowl =

2007 Allstate Sugar Bowl
- BCS Bowl Game; 73rd Sugar Bowl
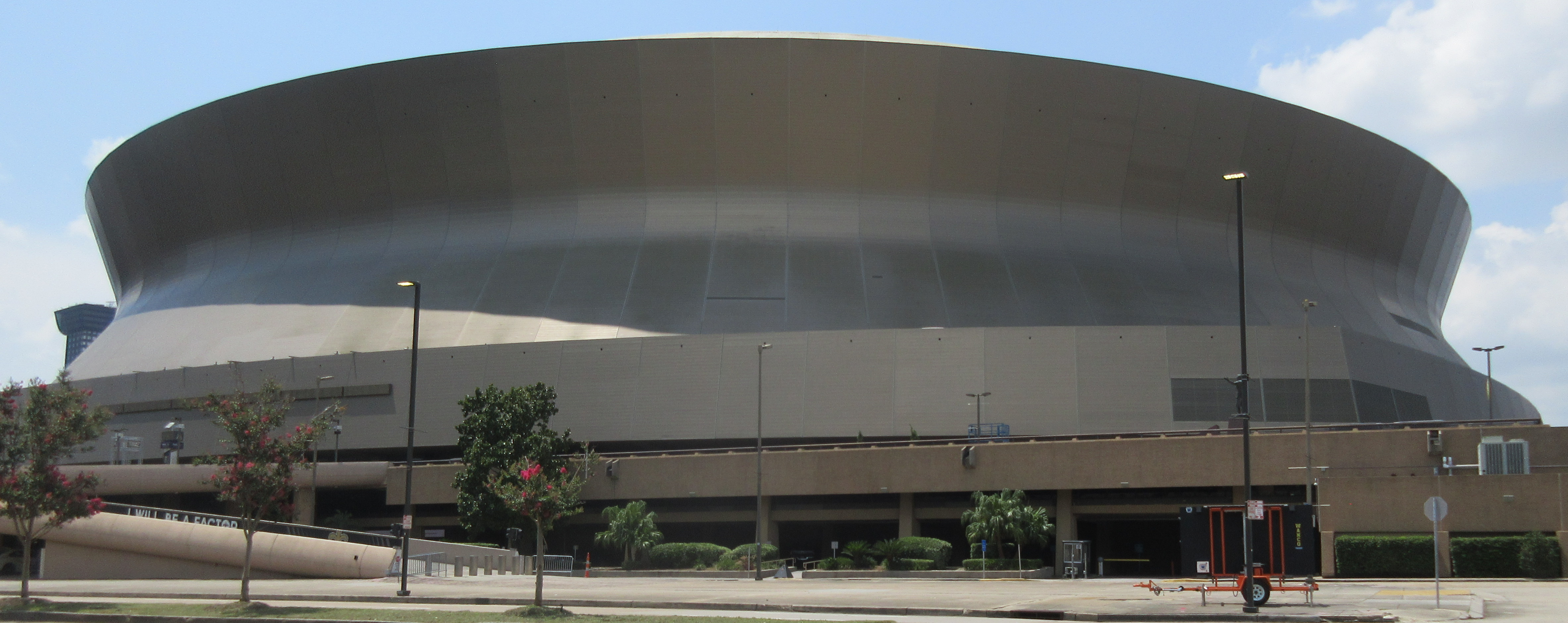
- The Louisiana Superdome in New Orleans, Louisiana, hosted the Sugar Bowl.
Notre Dame Fighting Irish	LSU Tigers
(10–2)	(10–2)
Independent	SEC
14	41
Head coach: Charlie Weis	Head coach: Les Miles
AP / Coaches / BCS; 11 / 11 / 11	AP / Coaches / BCS; 4 / 4 / 4
	1	2	3	4	Total
Notre Dame	7	7	0	0	14
LSU	14	7	13	7	41
- Date: January 3, 2007
- Season: 2006
- Stadium: Louisiana Superdome
- Location: New Orleans, Louisiana
- MVP: LSU QB JaMarcus Russell
- Favorite: LSU by 8½
- National anthem: Irvin Mayfield
- Referee: Tom Walker (Big XII)
- Halftime show: LSU and Notre Dame Marching Bands
- Attendance: 77,781

United States TV coverage
- Network: FOX
- Announcers: Kenny Albert, Terry Bradshaw, Howie Long
- Nielsen ratings: 9.3

The 2007 Allstate Sugar Bowl was a college football bowl game, which formed part of the 2006–2007 Bowl Championship Series (BCS) of the 2006 NCAA Division I FBS football season. Played on January 3, 2007, in the Louisiana Superdome in New Orleans, it was the 73rd Sugar Bowl. The game matched the Notre Dame Fighting Irish against the LSU Tigers and was televised on Fox.

This game received extra attention because it was the return of the Sugar Bowl to New Orleans. In 2006, the game was played at the Georgia Dome in Atlanta, Georgia due to the damage caused by Hurricane Katrina to the Superdome (that game also featured a virtual "home" team, the Georgia Bulldogs). LSU won the 2007 contest 41–14, tying the Notre Dame-LSU series at 5–5 (with LSU taking a 2–0 lead in bowl game meetings).

With the loss, Notre Dame lost a record-setting nine bowl games in a row, including losing their three BCS bowl games by wide point margins.

== Teams ==
=== Notre Dame ===
Notre Dame, a Division I FBS independent, finished the regular season at 10–2. The Fighting Irish entered the season ranked at no. 2 in the AP Poll before losing 21–47 to no. 11 Michigan in week three. The team won its next eight games, reaching no. 6 in the AP Poll, but lost the regular season finale 24–44 to no. 3 USC. The Fighting Irish entered the Sugar Bowl ranked no. 11 in all three polls.

=== LSU ===
LSU, from the Southeastern Conference (SEC), finished the regular season at 10–2. The Tigers entered the season ranked at no. 8 in the AP Poll before losing 3–7 to no. 3 Auburn in week three. The team won its next two games before losing to no. 5 Florida 10–23. The Tigers won their next six games, including victories over no. 8 Tennessee and no. 5 Arkansas. LSU entered the Sugar Bowl ranked no. 4 in all three polls.

== Game summary ==
2007 Allstate Sugar Bowl

Quarter	1	2	3	4	Total
No. 11 Notre Dame	7	7	0	0	14
No. 4 LSU	14	7	13	7	41

at Louisiana Superdome • New Orleans, Louisiana

- Game time: 8:00 p.m. EST (7:00 p.m. CST)
- Game weather: None (indoor stadium)
- Game attendance: 77,781
- Referee: Tom Walker
- TV announcers (Fox): Kenny Albert (play-by-play), Terry Bradshaw (analyst) and Howie Long (sideline)

Game information

First quarter

- LSU – Keiland Williams 3-yard run (Colt David kick), 11:16. Tigers 7–0. Drive: 2 plays, 34 yards, 0:49.
- LSU – Dwayne Bowe 11-yard pass from JaMarcus Russell (Colt David kick), 6:03. Tigers 14–0. Drive: 8 plays, 80 yards, 3:40.
- ND – David Grimes 24-yard pass from Brady Quinn (Carl Gioia kick), 1:26. Tigers 14–7. Drive: 8 plays, 80 yards, 4:37.

Second quarter

- ND – Jeff Samardzija 10-yard pass from Brady Quinn (Carl Gioia kick), 2:25. Tied 14–14. Drive: 8 plays, 80 yards, 2:39.
- LSU – JaMarcus Russell 5-yard run (Colt David kick), 1:15. Tigers 21–14. Drive: 5 plays, 82 yards, 1:10.

Third quarter

- LSU – Colt David 26-yard field goal, 9:34. Tigers 24–14. Drive: 13 plays, 73 yards, 5:26.
- LSU – Colt David 37-yard field goal, 3:49. Tigers 27–14. Drive: 9 plays, 59 yards, 4:06.
- LSU – Brandon LaFell 58-yard pass from JaMarcus Russell (Colt David kick), 1:26. Tigers 34–14. Drive: 5 plays, 73 yards, 1:38.

Fourth quarter

- LSU – Keiland Williams 20-yard run (Colt David kick), 7:27. Tigers 41–14. Drive: 9 plays, 76 yards, 4:11.

=== Statistics ===
Statistics	ND	LSU
First downs	17	31
Plays–yards	66–291	71–577
Rushes–yards	31–143	37–245
Passing yards	158	345
Passing: comp–att–int	15–35–2	21–34–1
Time of possession	28:14	31:46

Team	Category	Player	Statistics
Notre Dame	Passing	Brady Quinn	15/35, 148 yards, 2 TD, 2 INT
Notre Dame	Rushing	Darius Walker	22 rushes, 128 yards
Notre Dame	Receiving	Jeff Samardzija	8 receptions, 59 yards, TD
LSU	Passing	JaMarcus Russell	21/34, 332 yards, 2 TD, INT
LSU	Rushing	Keiland Williams	14 rushes, 107 yards, 2 TD
LSU	Receiving	Early Doucet	8 receptions, 115 yards

== Aftermath ==
LSU has played three national championship games in the Superdome since, defeating Ohio State for the 2007 BCS title, losing to Alabama for the 2011 BCS crown, and defeating Clemson in the College Football Playoff title game following the 2019 season. LSU also defeated Tulane in a 2007 regular season game in the Superdome.

LSU and Notre Dame met in the 2014 Music City Bowl and 2018 Citrus Bowl, with the Fighting Irish winning both. Brian Kelly, who led Notre Dame to those wins, became the Tigers' coach in 2022 after 12 seasons in South Bend.
