= 2006 LSU Tigers football team =

American college football season

2006 LSU Tigers football

Sugar Bowl champion

Sugar Bowl, W 41–14 vs. Notre Dame
- Conference: Southeastern Conference
- Western Division

Ranking
- Coaches: No. 3
- AP: No. 3
- Record: 11–2 (6–2 SEC)
- Head coach: Les Miles (2nd season)
- Offensive coordinator: Jimbo Fisher (7th season)
- Offensive scheme: Pro-style
- Defensive coordinator: Bo Pelini (2nd season)
- Base defense: 4–3
- Home stadium: Tiger Stadium

2006 Southeastern Conference football standings
	Conf.			Overall
Team	W		L	W		L
Eastern Division
No. 1 Florida x$#	7	–	1	13	–	1
No. 25 Tennessee	5	–	3	9	–	4
No. 23 Georgia	4	–	4	9	–	4
Kentucky	4	–	4	8	–	5
South Carolina	3	–	5	8	–	5
Vanderbilt	1	–	7	4	–	8
Western Division
No. 15 Arkansas x	7	–	1	10	–	4
No. 9 Auburn	6	–	2	11	–	2
No. 3 LSU %	6	–	2	11	–	2
Alabama	2	–	6	6	–	7
Ole Miss	2	–	6	4	–	8
Mississippi State	1	–	7	3	–	9
Championship: Florida 38, Arkansas 28
# – BCS National Champion; $ – BCS representative as conference champion; % – BCS at-large representative; x – Division champion/co-champions; Alabama had all victories vacated by the NCAA in 2010. As such, the official record for Alabama is 0–7 (0–6).; Rankings from AP Poll

The 2006 LSU Tigers football team represented Louisiana State University in the college football season of 2006–2007. The team was coached by Les Miles. It played its home games at Tiger Stadium in Baton Rouge, Louisiana. The team won a bid to play in the Bowl Championship Series Allstate Sugar Bowl at the Louisiana Superdome in New Orleans, playing No. 11 Notre Dame on January 3, 2007.

== Pre-season ==
The 2006 LSU Tigers football team was ranked in the top 10 in the country by multiple publications and were expected to compete for the SEC championship.

== Schedule ==
Date	Time	Opponent	Rank	Site	TV	Result	Attendance
September 2	7:00 p.m.	Louisiana–Lafayette*	No. 8	Tiger Stadium; Baton Rouge, LA	PPV	W 45–3	92,362
September 9	5:30 p.m.	Arizona*	No. 8	Tiger Stadium; Baton Rouge, LA	ESPN2	W 45–3	92,221
September 16	2:30 p.m.	at No. 3 Auburn	No. 6	Jordan–Hare Stadium; Auburn, AL (Tiger Bowl)	CBS	L 3–7	87,451
September 23	7:00 p.m.	Tulane*^{†}	No. 10	Tiger Stadium; Baton Rouge, LA (Battle for the Rag)	PPV	W 49–7	92,135
September 30	11:30 a.m.	Mississippi State	No. 9	Tiger Stadium; Baton Rouge, LA (rivalry)	LFS	W 48–17	91,960
October 7	2:30 p.m.	at No. 5 Florida	No. 9	Ben Hill Griffin Stadium; Gainesville, FL (rivalry) (College GameDay)	CBS	L 10–23	90,714
October 14	7:00 p.m.	Kentucky	No. 14	Tiger Stadium; Baton Rouge, LA	PPV	W 49–0	92,148
October 21	8:00 p.m.	Fresno State*	No. 14	Tiger Stadium; Baton Rouge, LA	ESPN2	W 38–6	91,833
November 4	2:30 p.m.	at No. 8 Tennessee	No. 13	Neyland Stadium; Knoxville, TN	CBS	W 28–24	106,333
November 11	6:45 p.m.	Alabama	No. 12	Tiger Stadium; Baton Rouge, LA (rivalry)	ESPN	W 28–14	92,588
November 18	7:00 p.m.	Ole Miss	No. 9	Tiger Stadium; Baton Rouge, LA (Magnolia Bowl)	PPV	W 23–20 ^{OT}	92,449
November 24	1:30 p.m.	at No. 5 Arkansas	No. 9	War Memorial Stadium; Little Rock, AR (Battle for the Boot)	CBS	W 31–26	55,833
January 3, 2007	7:00 p.m.	vs. No. 11 Notre Dame*	No. 4	Louisiana Superdome; New Orleans, LA (Sugar Bowl)	FOX	W 41–14	77,781
*Non-conference game; ^{†}Homecoming; Rankings from AP Poll released prior to the game; All times are in Central time

== Honors ==
Player	Honors
Will Arnold	Second-Team All-SEC (AP)
Ciron Black	First-Team Freshman All-America (College Football News); Third-Team Freshman All-America (Sporting News); Freshman All-SEC (SEC Coaches)
Dwayne Bowe	Third-Team All-America (Rivals.com); First-Team All-SEC (SEC Coaches); Second-Team All-SEC (AP); SEC Offensive Player of the Week (Oct. 21 vs. Fresno State)
Jacob Cutrera	Third-Team Freshman All-America (Sporting News)
Craig Davis	Second-Team All-SEC (SEC Coaches)
Richard Dickson	Second-Team All-SEC (SEC Coaches); Honorable Mention Freshman All-America (Sporting News)
Glenn Dorsey	First-Team All-America (AP, AFCA, CBS Sportsline.com, SI.com, Rivals.com); First-Team All-SEC (SEC Coaches, AP, ESPN.com); SEC Defensive Lineman of the Week (Sept. 9 vs. Arizona); SEC Defensive Lineman of the Week (Sept. 16 vs. Auburn)
Ali Highsmith	Second-Team All-SEC (SEC Coaches)
Trindon Holliday	SEC Special Teams Player of the Week (Nov. 24 vs. Arkansas)
Tyson Jackson	Second-Team All-SEC (SEC Coaches); SEC Defensive Lineman of the Week (Nov. 11 vs. Alabama)
Ricky Jean-Francois	First-Team Freshman All-America (Sporting News); Second-Team Freshman All-America (College Football News); Freshman All-SEC (SEC Coaches)
Brian Johnson	Second-Team All-SEC (AP)
Brandon LaFell	Freshman All-SEC (SEC Coaches)
LaRon Landry	First-Team All-America (AP, AFCA); Second-Team All-America (Walter Camp, SI.com, Rivals.com); First-Team All-SEC (SEC Coaches, AP)
Chase Pittman	SEC Defensive Lineman of the Week (Sept. 23 vs. Tulane)
JaMarcus Russell	First-Team All-SEC (SEC Coaches, AP, ESPN.com); SEC Offensive Player of the Week (Sept. 30 vs. Mississippi State); SEC Offensive Player of the Week (Oct. 14 vs. Kentucky); SEC Offensive Player of the Week (Nov. 4 vs. Tennessee); Sugar Bowl MVP; Manning Award

== Game summaries ==
=== UL-Lafayette ===
	1	2	3	4	Total
Ragin' Cajuns	0	3	0	0	3
Tigers	14	14	7	10	45

This game was the Season opener for Tigers. The game was being played in front of the home crowd in Death Valley. Last years season opener was a 35 to 31 win for the tigers. LSU V UL-Lafayette, Already five minutes into the game LSU had a 14–0 lead off an offensive drive down field and a defensive turnover. From this point on, LSU rolled on to win the game 45 to 3.

=== Arizona ===
	1	2	3	4	Total
Arizona	0	0	0	3	3
Tigers	17	7	14	7	45

This game was broadcast around the nation on ESPN2. This game was played at home. The game was over when JaMarcus Russell threw his first TD of the night late in the first quarter to make it 17–0 LSU.

The LSU defense limited Arizona to 156 total yards and recovered four Wildcats turnovers. Arizona's third-down efficiency was only one of the Wildcats problems in Baton Rouge.

=== Auburn ===
	1	2	3	4	Total
Tigers	0	3	0	0	3
Auburn Tigers	0	0	7	0	7

Last year LSU pulled it out against Auburn, beating them 20 to 17 in overtime. This was a game between No. 3 Auburn and No. 6 LSU. This was the first away game for the Tigers, and it would be controversial one. LSU came into the game with a string of 14 quarters without allowing a touchdown, they also came in with the best defense in the country. It would go down to the last play of the game. This game would have two elements: two punishing defenses, a pivotal officials' call that left both sides a bit perplexed and some follies in the kicking game.

With LSU facing fourth-and-8 from Auburn's 31 and 2:43 left, JaMarcus Russell fired the ball to Early Doucet near the goal line. A diving Eric Brock deflected the pass, but Zach Gilbert was called for pass interference that would have kept the drive alive.

The officials overturned the call, although replays showed the contact came before the ball was tipped by Brock. On the whole, there were anywhere between 5 and 8 questionable calls against LSU, and LSU fans felt cheated by the outcome, giving this game the nickname Grand Theft Auburn.

The Tigers drove to Auburn's 24 with 2.5 seconds left as Russell hooked up with Craig Davis for gains of 20 and 21 yards and Dwayne Bowe for 21. On the final play, Russell went to Davis again. The receiver caught the pass inside the 10, but Brock stopped him cold with a jarring hit at the 4.

"It was a low throw on the final play, but it was not JaMarcus' fault", Davis said. "I was expecting it to be a jump ball in the end zone."

Underscoring the physical nature of the game, the two teams combined for less than 2 yards a rush on 61 combined carries.

=== Tulane ===
	1	2	3	4	Total
Green Wave	0	0	0	7	7
Tigers	14	14	14	7	49

LSU brought Tulane's 14-game span away from New Orleans to an end.

Early Doucet caught two touchdown passes and ran for a third score as the No. 9 Tigers jumped out to a large early lead in a 49–7 victory over Tulane on Saturday night.

=== Mississippi State ===
	1	2	3	4	Total
Bulldogs	0	3	7	7	17
Tigers	21	14	14	13	62

1. 9 LSU would take on Mississippi State in Baton Rouge. The game would take place at 11:30 am CST.

JaMarcus Russell, who orchestrated the Tigers' 48–17 throttling of the Bulldogs, finished with three TDs on 18-for-20 passing and 327 yards.

Mississippi State put the ball on the ground, but they didn't move it forward. On 20 rushing attempts, the Bulldogs gained just 24 total yards.

=== Florida ===
	1	2	3	4	Total
Tigers	7	0	0	3	10
Florida	7	7	9	3	26

It was over when JaMarcus Russell pass was intercepted by Tony Joiner of Florida with 3:00 left in the game.

=== Kentucky ===
	1	2	3	4	Total
Wildcats	0	0	0	0	0
Tigers	14	14	14	7	49

=== Fresno St. ===
There was a lot of excitement when this game was scheduled because Fresno State had been a top 25 team the previous season. In fact, they took No. 1 USC down to the wire and almost beat them. For this reason, ESPN decided to telecast this game nationally. Unfortunately, Fresno State underperformed this season and LSU took advantage of this early and often, winning 38–6.

	1	2	3	4	Total
Bulldogs	0	3	3	0	6
Tigers	14	3	7	14	38

=== Tennessee ===
	1	2	3	4	Total
Tigers	0	7	14	7	28
Volunteers	0	10	7	7	24

LSU QB JaMarcus Russell threw a touchdown pass with 9 seconds remaining to give the LSU Tigers a 28–24 victory over Tennessee. The Vols looked good at times during the game, but could not make a stop on LSU's final drive of the game, which consumed 7:14 from the clock. QB Erik Ainge, starting with a sore ankle, was replaced in the 1st quarter by redshirt freshman Jonathan Crompton. Crompton performed well for his first significant action, connecting on two long touchdown passes to Robert Meachem. On Defense, Tennessee intercepted Russell 3 times and recovered 1 fumble.

=== Alabama ===
	1	2	3	4	Total
Crimson Tide	7	7	0	0	14
Tigers	14	7	7	0	28

=== Ole Miss ===
	1	2	3	4	OT	Total
Rebels	0	14	6	0	0	20
Tigers	0	7	0	13	3	23

=== Arkansas ===
	1	2	3	4	Total
Tigers	7	7	3	14	31
Razorbacks	6	6	0	14	26

The No. 9 ranked LSU Tigers final regular season game was in Little Rock, Arkansas against the No. 5 ranked Arkansas Razorbacks. The Razorbacks only loss to this point of the season was a 50–14 defeat at the hands of the No. 3 ranked USC Trojans. LSU lead most of the game holding a 14–12 half time lead, but in the fourth quarter Arkansas made their push. With 10:31 remaining in the fourth quarter Darren McFadden scored on an 80-yard touchdown run to cut the LSU lead to 24–19. LSU responded with a 92-yard kickoff return by Trindon Holliday. Holliday's kick return proved to be the difference in a 31–26 LSU win.

=== Sugar Bowl ===
Sugar Bowl
Notre Dame vs. LSU

Team	1	2	3	4	Total
Notre Dame	7	7	0	0	14
• LSU	14	7	13	7	41

- Date: January 3
- Location: Louisiana Superdome, New Orleans, Louisiana
- Game start: 8:00 p.m. EST
- Game weather: Indoors (dome)

Scoring summary
Q1	11:16	LSU	Keiland Williams 6 yard run (Colt David kick)	LSU 7–0
Q1	6:03	LSU	Dwayne Bowe 11 yard pass from JaMarcus Russell (Colt David kick)	LSU 14–0
Q1	1:26	ND	David Grimes 24 yard pass from Brady Quinn (Carl Gioia kick)	LSU 14–7
Q2	2:25	ND	Jeff Samardzija 10 yard pass from Brady Quinn (Carl Gioia kick)	Tie 14–14
Q2	1:15	LSU	JaMarcus Russell 5 yard run (Colt David kick)	LSU 21–14
Q3	9:34	LSU	Colt David 25 yard field goal	LSU 24–14
Q3	3:48	LSU	Colt David 37 yard field goal	LSU 27–14
Q3	:18	LSU	Brandon LaFell 58 yard pass from JaMarcus Russell (Colt David kick)	LSU 34–14
Q4	7:27	LSU	Keiland Williams 20 yard run (Ryan Gaudet kick)	LSU 41–14

In a game that was advertised as a battle between the nations top-2 quarterbacks (LSU QB JaMarcus Russell vs. ND QB Brady Quinn), Russell and the LSU Tigers made sure the praise was one-sided. Russell set career high marks for yardage and TD's (3) before sealing a 41–14 victory. Russell would use this to springboard himself to the top of the 2007 draft boards as he was selected number 1 over by the Oakland Raiders, while Quinn, a hopeful number 1 overall pick himself, fell all the way to the Cleveland Browns at pick 22.

== LSU Tigers in the 2007 National Football League Draft ==
Player	Position	Round	Pick	Overall	NFL team
Jamarcus Russell	Quarterback	1	1	1	Oakland Raiders
LaRon Landry	Safety	1	6	6	Washington Redskins
Dwayne Bowe	Wide Receiver	1	23	23	Kansas City Chiefs
Craig Davis	Wide Receiver	1	30	30	San Diego Chargers
Chase Pittman	Defensive End	7	3	213	Cleveland Browns

https://www.pro-football-reference.com/draft/2007.htm
