= Darius Walker =

American football player (born 1985)

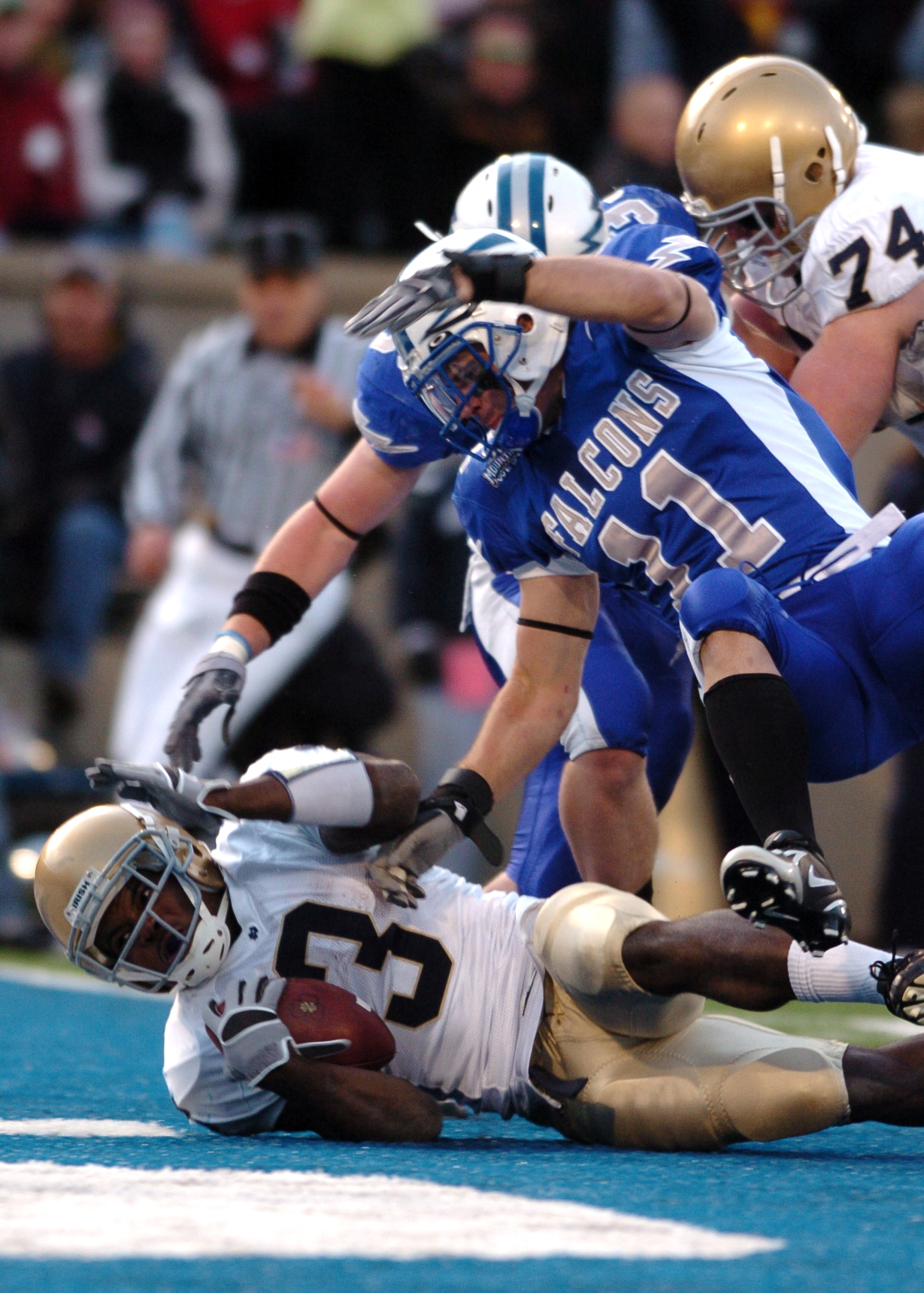
- Walker (#3) with the Notre Dame Fighting Irish

No. 37
- Position: Running back

Personal information
- Born: October 21, 1985 (age 41); Atlanta, Georgia, U.S.
- Listed height: 5 ft 10 in (1.78 m)
- Listed weight: 206 lb (93 kg)

Career information
- High school: Buford (Buford, Georgia)
- College: Notre Dame
- NFL draft: 2007: undrafted

Career history
- Houston Texans (2007–2008); St. Louis Rams (2008)*; Houston Texans (2008)*; Denver Broncos (2009)*
- * Offseason or practice squad member only

Career NFL statistics
- Rushing attempts: 58
- Rushing yards: 264
- Rushing touchdowns: 1
- Receptions: 13
- Receiving yards: 81
- Stats at Pro Football Reference

Darius A'Dunte Walker (born October 21, 1985) is an American former professional football player who was a running back in the National Football League (NFL). He played college football for the Notre Dame Fighting Irish. He was signed by the Houston Texans in 2007. After his playing career, Walker became a college football analyst. He worked as an analyst and sideline reporter for MountainWest Sports Network in 2011 and later joined TruTV.

== Early life ==
Walker attended Buford High School where he rushed for 5,676 rushing yards and 91 touchdowns and helped his team compile a four-year record of 58–2 and four straight state title game appearances, including three title game victories as part of a 45-game winning streak. In 2003, his senior year, he scored 46 touchdowns, breaking Herschel Walker's Georgia single-season record of 42. He was named the Gatorade Player of the Year in Georgia and selected as the Georgia prep player of the year for 2003 by the Atlanta Journal-Constitution.

== College career ==
At Notre Dame, Walker owns the school record for most receptions in a season by a running back (56 in 2006) and most career receptions by a running back (109). He ranks fourth all-time at Notre Dame in rushing yards (3,249), third in all-time carries (693) and third in average yards per game over a career (90.3). He rushed for 100 yards in a game 15 times in his career and scored 26 touchdowns—23 rushing and three receiving. He led the Irish in rushing in all three seasons, becoming just the sixth player in school history to do so the first since Autry Denson (1995–1998). He recorded the sixth-best single-season rushing total in Notre Dame history as a junior when he gained a career-high 1,267 yards on 255 carries (5.0-yard average), scoring seven touchdowns. He became just the fourth Notre Dame running back in school history to eclipse 1,000 rushing yards in consecutive seasons, joining Vagas Ferguson, Allen Pinkett and Denson. He ran for 1,196 yards on 253 carries (4.7 avg) and nine touchdowns as a sophomore, opening the season with four rushing performances of 100 yards or more, the first player in Notre Dame history to do so. During his first season for the Irish, he set the freshman rushing record, gaining 786 yards on 185 carries (4.2 average), breaking a 30-year-old school record.

Walker's last game with the Irish came on January 3, 2007, in New Orleans, Louisiana at the Sugar Bowl. The Fighting Irish lost to the LSU Tigers 41–14, with Walker contributing 128 rushing and 30 receiving yards.

He announced he would leave Notre Dame for the NFL in a press conference a week after the Sugar Bowl. In 2009, Walker returned to the University of Notre Dame to finish his degree.

=== Statistics ===
| College Career Off. Statistics | | | Rushing | | | | | Fumbles | |
| Year | Team | G | Att | Yards | AVG | LNG | TD | FUM | LOST |
| 2004 | Notre Dame Fighting Irish | 11 | 185 | 786 | 4.2 | 40 | 7 | -- | -- |
| 2005 | Notre Dame Fighting Irish | 12 | 253 | 1,196 | 4.6 | 38 | 3 | -- | -- |
| 2006 | Notre Dame Fighting Irish | 13 | 255 | 1,267 | 5.0 | 39 | 7 | -- | -- |
| Total | | 36 | 693 | 3,249 | 4.6 | 40 | 17 | -- | -- |

| College Career Off. Statistics | | | Receiving | | | | |
| Year | Team | G | Rec | Yards | Y/R | TD | LNG |
| 2004 | Notre Dame Fighting Irish | 11 | 10 | 74 | 7.4 | 0 | 22 |
| 2005 | Notre Dame Fighting Irish | 12 | 43 | 351 | 8.7 | 2 | 51 |
| 2006 | Notre Dame Fighting Irish | 13 | 56 | 391 | 7.0 | 1 | 21 |
| Total | | 36 | 109 | 816 | 7.4 | 3 | 51 |

== Professional career ==
=== Houston Texans ===
Walker signed a contract with the Houston Texans after not being taken in the 2007 NFL draft. In Week 14, Walker led the team with 16 carries for 46 yards and finishing second with six receptions for 35 yards against Tampa Bay. Walker re-signed with the Houston Texans on November 25, 2008, when the team placed Ahman Green on the reserve/injured list. Walker rushed for 246 yards and one touchdown on 58 carries (4.6 avg.) in his one NFL season. He also caught 13 passes for 81 yards.

=== Denver Broncos ===
On May 7, 2009, Walker signed a two-year contract with the Denver Broncos.

=== Dallas Cowboys ===
He signed with the Dallas Cowboys on December 15, 2009, for $250,000 on a one-year deal.

== Career after football ==
Walker attended classes at the University of Houston while he played in the NFL for the Houston Texans in 2008, before eventually returning to Notre Dame and completing his degree in 2009.

== Personal life ==
Darius Walker is the son of Jimmy Walker, a former All-American defensive tackle at the University of Arkansas who played in the NFL with the Minnesota Vikings. His grandfather, William "Sonny" Walker played football at the University of Arkansas-Pine Bluff and was the first African American to serve in the Arkansas state cabinet. He also served in the Nixon administration, working at the Office of Economic Opportunity. Walker's uncle Hugh Jernigan played at the University of Arkansas as a defensive back and was a ninth round draft pick of the Detroit Lions in 1981. His older brother Delvin played running back for Jacksonville State University.
