= JaMarcus Russell =

American football player (born 1985)

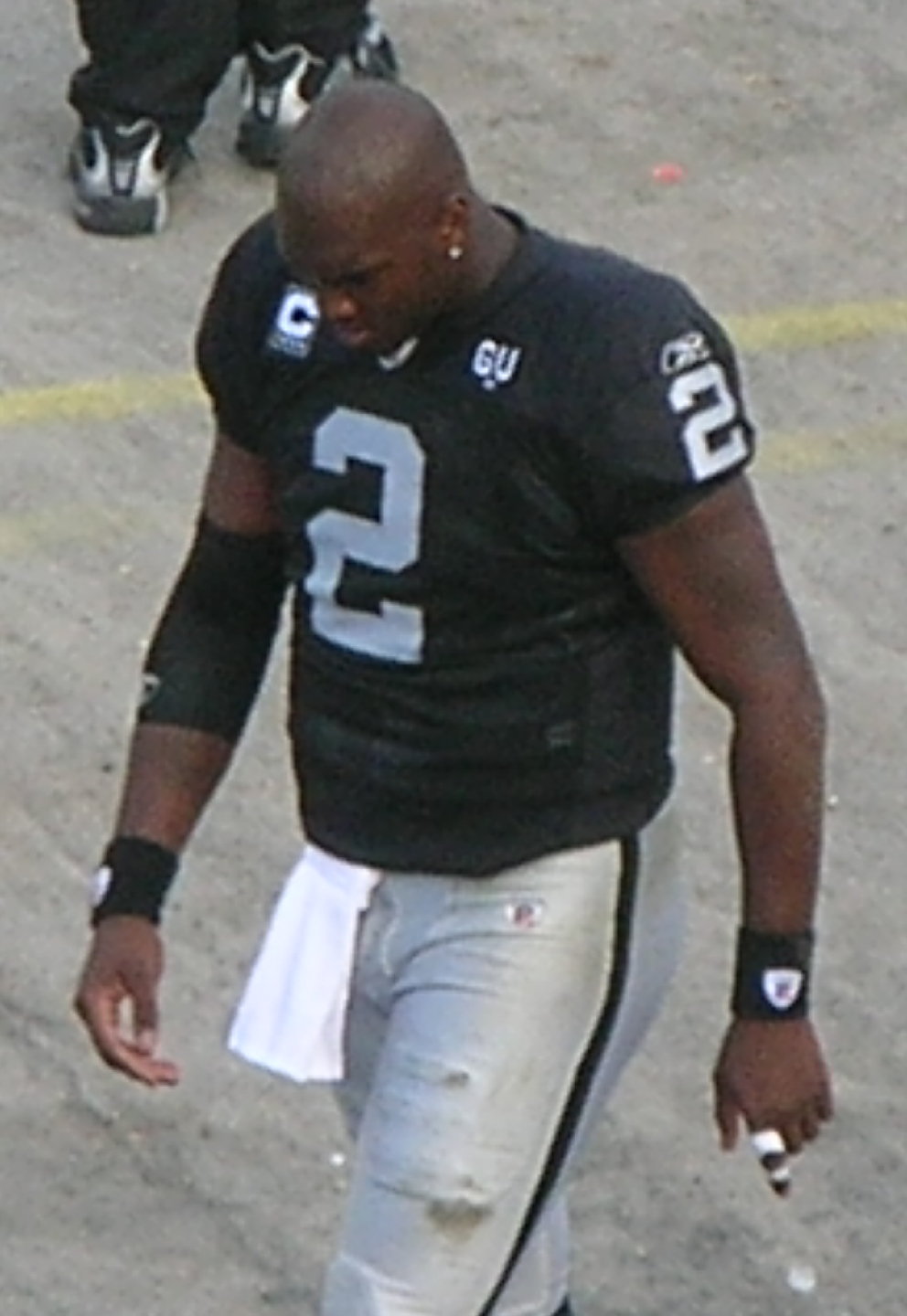
- Russell with the Oakland Raiders in 2008

No. 2
- Position: Quarterback

Personal information
- Born: August 9, 1985 (age 41); Mobile, Alabama, U.S.
- Listed height: 6 ft 6 in (1.98 m)
- Listed weight: 265 lb (120 kg)

Career information
- High school: Williamson (Mobile)
- College: LSU (2003–2006)
- NFL draft: 2007: 1st round, 1st overall pick

Career history
- Oakland Raiders (2007–2009)

Awards and highlights
- BCS national champion (2003); Manning Award (2006); First-team All-SEC (2006)

Career NFL statistics
- Passing attempts: 680
- Passing completions: 354
- Completion percentage: 52.1%
- TD–INT: 18–23
- Passing yards: 4,083
- Passer rating: 65.2
- Stats at Pro Football Reference

JaMarcus Trenell Russell (born August 9, 1985) is an American former professional football quarterback who played in the National Football League (NFL) for three seasons with the Oakland Raiders. He played college football for the LSU Tigers, winning the Manning Award in 2006 en route to becoming the most valuable player of the 2007 Sugar Bowl.

Russell was selected first overall by the Raiders in the 2007 NFL draft, but his tenure was marked by inconsistent play and questions over his work ethic. He was released from Oakland in 2010 and, despite attempts at an NFL return, was unable to sign with another team. Due to not meeting the expectations of being the first pick and the short length of his career, he is considered one of the NFL's biggest draft busts.

== Early life ==
Russell was born in Mobile, Alabama, and attended Lillie B. Williamson High School. For all four years under head coach Bobby Parrish, he started and never missed a football game. In his freshman year, Russell completed 180 of 324 passes for 2,683 yards and 20 touchdowns as Williamson reached the state championship game. By the next season, Russell had grown to six-foot-three and 185 pounds, had received his first recruiting letters, and was becoming more adept with the playbook. Russell passed for 2,616 yards and 20 touchdowns during his sophomore year and led the team to the semifinals.

Russell's best season was his senior year; he completed 219 of 372 passes for 3,332 yards and 22 touchdowns and rushed for another 400 yards and five touchdowns. This earned Russell Parade magazine All-American honorable mention honors. His 10,774 career passing yards broke the Alabama High School Athletic Association record and still stands today.

Russell was at the center of an ESPN Outside the Lines story on high school sports in Mobile. He also played basketball and threw the javelin in track and field.

College recruiting
Name	Hometown	School	Height	Weight	40^{‡}	Commit date
JaMarcus Russell; QB	Mobile, Alabama	Williamson HS	6 ft 5 in (1.96 m)	223 lb (101 kg)	4.76	Jul 8, 2003
JaMarcus Russell; QB	Recruit ratings: Scout: Rivals:					
Overall recruit ranking: Scout: 4 (QB); 2 (school) Rivals: 6 (QB); 79 (national); 3 (LA); 1 (school)
‡ Refers to 40-yard dash; Note: In many cases, Scout, Rivals, 247Sports, On3, and ESPN may conflict in their listings of height, weight and 40 time.; In these cases, the average was taken. ESPN grades are on a 100-point scale.; Sources: "2003 LSU Football Commitment List". Rivals.; "2003 Louisiana State College Football Team Recruiting Prospects". Scout.; "Scout.com Team Recruiting Rankings". Scout.; "2003 Team Ranking". Rivals.com.

== College career ==
=== Freshman and sophomore seasons ===
In February 2003 on National Signing Day, Russell committed to Louisiana State University (LSU) over Florida State University, becoming the LSU Tigers' 28th and final recruit of the 2003 season. He redshirted his freshman year and by the fall of the 2005 season, Russell was the starting quarterback. He led the Tigers to a 10–1 regular season record, the Southeastern Conference (SEC) Western Division title, and a top five ranking going into the SEC Championship Game. He also improved statistically, completing 60 percent of his passes for 2,443 yards and 15 touchdowns. Russell received an honorable mention on the AP's All-SEC Team.

Russell led the Tigers to two come-from-behind wins in the regular season. The first came on a 39-yard pass to Early Doucet on 4th down in the final minute of the game, as the Tigers defeated Arizona State 35–31. Later in the season, LSU defeated a then-undefeated Alabama team 16–13 when he completed a 14-yard touchdown to Dwayne Bowe in overtime.

Russell injured his shoulder in a loss to Georgia in the SEC Championship Game, and missed the team's bowl game. Backup quarterback Matt Flynn replaced him for the Peach Bowl against Miami, and the Tigers won the game 40–3.

=== Junior season ===
Russell was the starting quarterback again at LSU in 2006, beating out Matt Flynn and highly touted redshirt freshman Ryan Perrilloux. Before the season began, he changed his jersey number from 4 to 2. He had a productive 2006 regular season, leading the Tigers to a 10–2 record and a BCS Sugar Bowl berth. He threw for 3,129 yards, 28 touchdowns and eight interceptions. He was second in the SEC with 2,923 yards from scrimmage. Russell also won the SEC Offensive Player of the Week award three times during the regular season.

During one game against Tennessee, Russell started the game poorly, throwing three interceptions (including one that was returned for a touchdown), but subsequently led LSU on a 15-play, 80-yard comeback drive at the end of the game. At the end of the drive, Russel threw a touchdown pass to Early Doucet while there was less than 10 seconds left. As a result, LSU won 28–24. In the Allstate Sugar Bowl, he accumulated over 350 yards of passing and rushing combined and scored three touchdowns, leading LSU to a 41–14 win over Notre Dame. For his performance, he was named Sugar Bowl MVP.

At the end of the 2006 season, Russell was named to the all-SEC first-team, ahead of Kentucky's Andre Woodson and Florida's Chris Leak.

On January 10, 2007, Russell stated that he had decided to skip his final season of NCAA eligibility to enter the 2007 NFL draft.

== Professional career ==
Pre-draft measurables
Height	Weight	Arm length	Hand span	40-yard dash	10-yard split	20-yard split	Vertical jump	Wonderlic
6 ft 5 1/2 in (1.97 m)	265 lb (120 kg)	32 3/4 in (0.83 m)	9 7/8 in (0.25 m)	4.72 s	1.67 s	2.78 s	31 in (0.79 m)	24
Values were taken at LSU Pro Day.

John Clayton of ESPN stated that Russell's arm strength and size impressed several teams during his workouts at the 2007 NFL Scouting Combine and predicted that it would "be hard to pass up on Russell at #1." At the combine, Russell stated about his size, "I started playing football at the age of 6, I've been playing quarterback ever since. I was always bigger and taller than the other kids, and I was always able to throw it a pretty good length of the field." Cleveland Browns General Manager Phil Savage said of Russell's abilities, "His talent is substantial. He's a rare combination of size and arm strength."

Russell was selected by the Oakland Raiders as the first overall pick. He was one of four LSU players taken in the first round, along with safety LaRon Landry, and wide receivers Dwayne Bowe and Craig Davis.

Former Detroit Lions general manager and Raiders linebacker Matt Millen said in 2015 he warned Raiders owner Al Davis not to draft Russell after Millen removed Russell from a pre-draft interview for being overly distracted. Raiders head coach Lane Kiffin also stated in 2016 he did not want to draft Russell, preferring future Pro Football Hall of Fame wide receiver Calvin Johnson. After firing him in 2008, Davis acknowledged Kiffin opposed drafting Russell, but was indecisive towards his preferred pick.

=== 2007 season ===
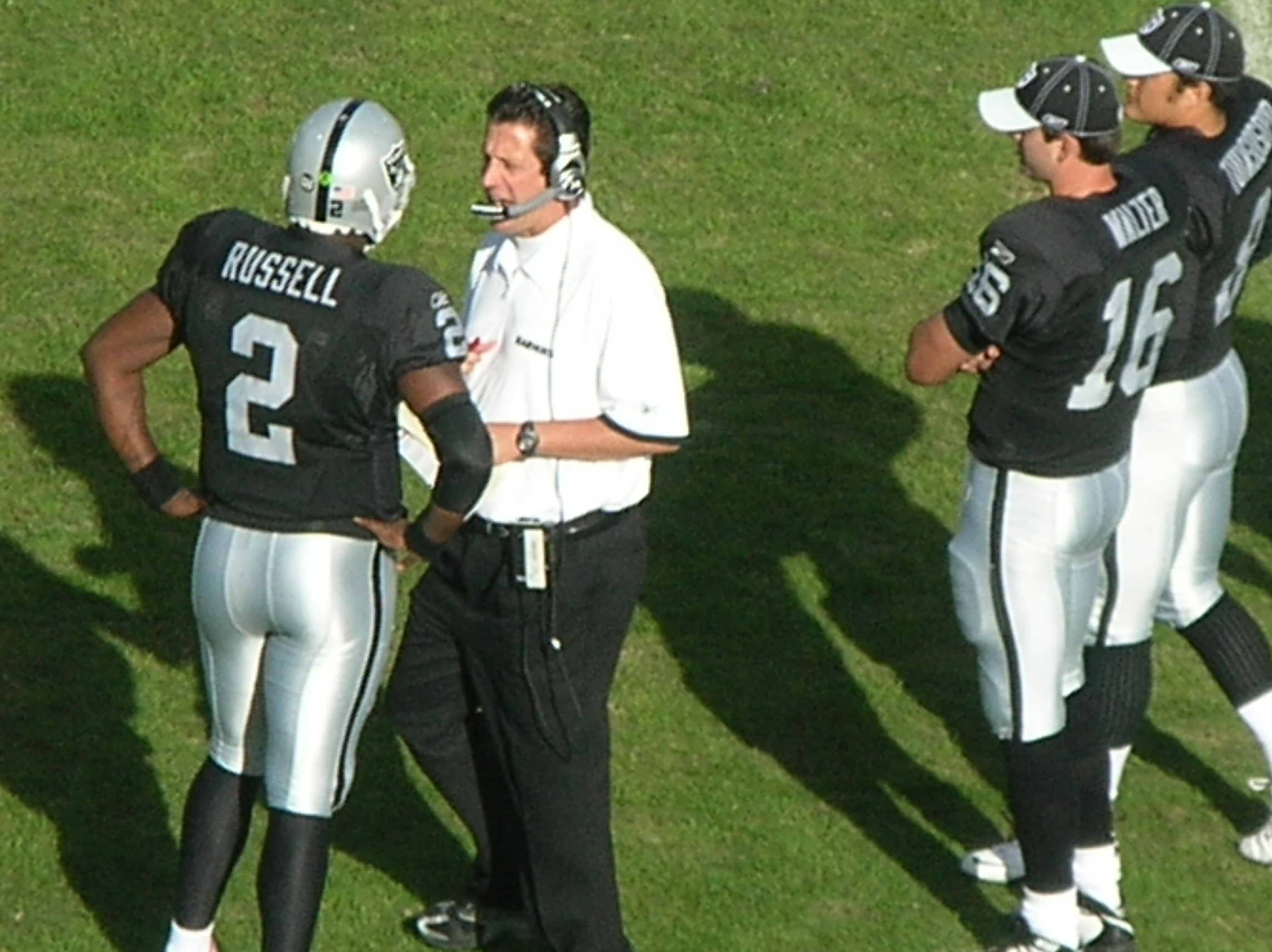
Russell talking with offensive coordinator Greg Knapp

After failing to reach a contract agreement with the Raiders, Russell held out through training camp and into the first week of the 2007 NFL season, until September 12, when he signed a six-year contract worth up to $68 million, with $31.5 million guaranteed. Raiders head coach Lane Kiffin did not immediately name Russell the starting quarterback, saying, "That way we can really control what he is doing, play for this set amount of time for this many plays. He doesn't have to have everything mastered," noting that Russell had missed all of training camp and other quarterbacks, like David Carr, should have been brought along more slowly.

Russell made his first professional appearance on December 2, 2007, against the Denver Broncos. Coming into the game in the second quarter in relief of starter Josh McCown, Russell played two series, and completed 4 of 7 pass attempts for 56 yards. On December 23, 2007, against the Jacksonville Jaguars, Russell threw his first career touchdown pass, a two-yard pass to Zach Miller. He finished the game with seven completions on 23 pass attempts for 83 yards, with one touchdown pass, three interceptions and a lost fumble.

Russell made his first career start in the final game of the season against the San Diego Chargers. He was intercepted twice and lost a fumble, which led to 17 points off turnovers for the Chargers. After throwing his second interception, he did not initially get up off the field due to an injury, and he was taken to the locker room on a cart later in the game, after which he was replaced by Andrew Walter. In that first start, Russell completed 23 of 31 passes for 224 yards, one touchdown, two interceptions, and a lost fumble. Russell finished his rookie season with 36 completed passes on 66 attempts, 373 yards, two touchdowns and four interceptions. After the San Diego game, Kiffin named him the starting quarterback for the upcoming 2008 season.

=== 2008 season ===
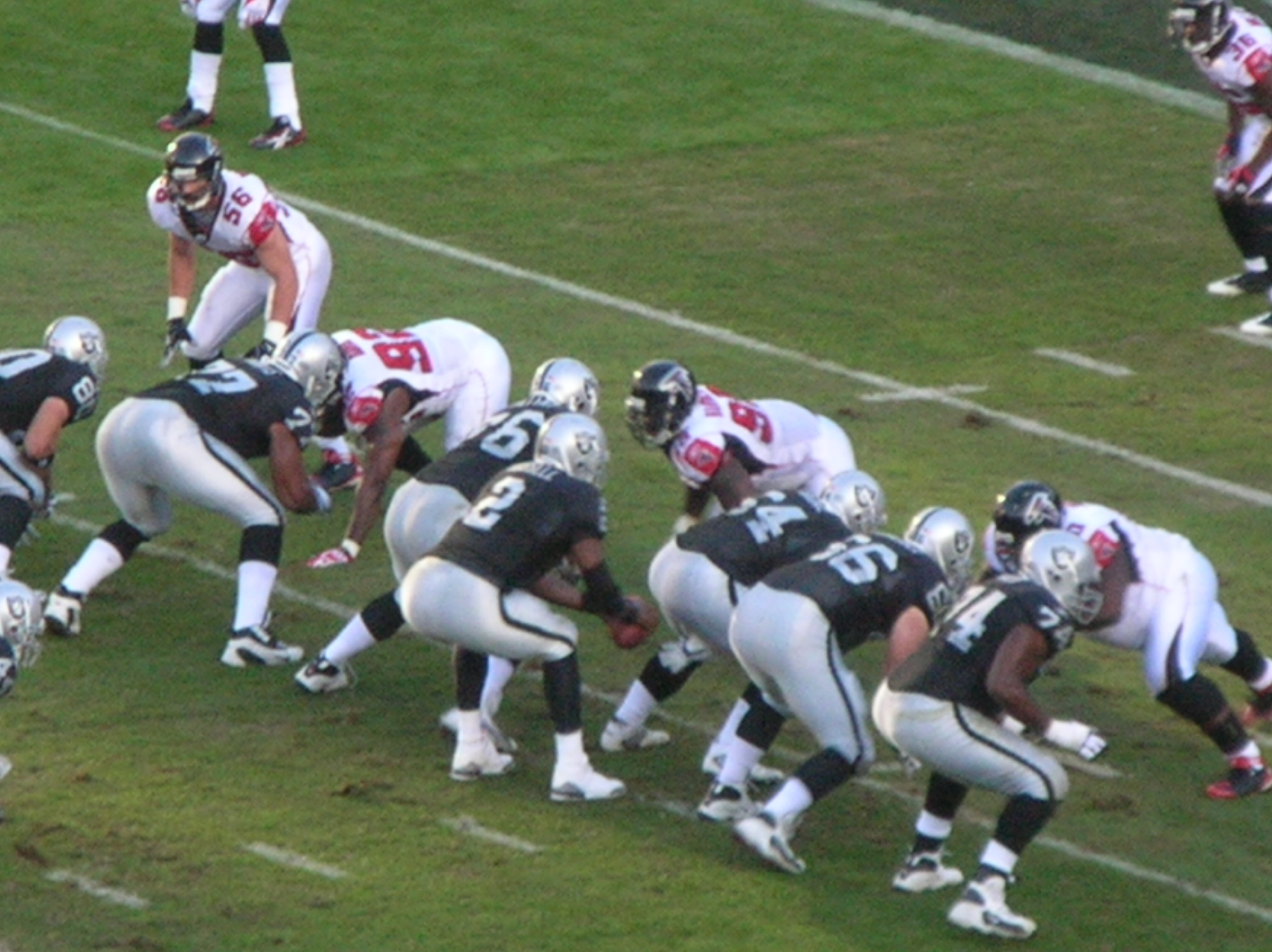
Russell (#2) taking the snap versus the Atlanta Falcons.

Russell was named the starter for the opening game of the 2008 season, which was against division rival Denver Broncos. The Raiders were beaten by the Broncos 41–14. Russell completed 17 of 26 pass attempts for 180 yards and also threw for two touchdowns, finishing with a passer rating of 111.1. He fumbled once early in the redzone while looking to complete a throw to Darren McFadden in the flat. In the next week against the Kansas City Chiefs, the Raiders won 23–8. Russell passed for 55 yards and completed 6 of 17 passes with no touchdowns or interceptions.

In Week 7, the Raiders beat the New York Jets 16–13 in overtime. The win ended their four-game home losing streak. Russell completed 17 of 30 passes for 203 yards and one touchdown. It was head coach Tom Cable's first win as Raiders head coach. Russell led the team on a 43-yard drive to set up Sebastian Janikowski's game-winning field goal. The next four games were losses to the Baltimore Ravens, Atlanta Falcons, Carolina Panthers, and Miami Dolphins. A week after the Miami game, he led the Raiders to a 31–10 victory against Denver where he completed 10 of 11 passes for 152 yards and threw one touchdown.

Russell finished the 2008 season winning back to back games against the Houston Texans and Tampa Bay Buccaneers. In those last three games, Russell threw for six touchdowns and two interceptions.

=== 2009 season ===
In August 2009, Russell was named starting quarterback of the Raiders for the season. In a Week 5 loss to the New York Giants, Russell lost three fumbles and passed for 100 yards. Following a loss to the Kansas City Chiefs on November 15, Russell was benched indefinitely by coach Tom Cable in favor of Bruce Gradkowski. Gradkowski led two fourth-quarter comebacks and upset the Cincinnati Bengals and Pittsburgh Steelers in the following two weeks, throwing five touchdown passes. After Gradkowski was injured against the Washington Redskins, Russell finished the game for the Raiders, which resulted in a loss. After the game, Cable decided to start backup Charlie Frye rather than Russell, which moved Russell to third on the depth chart. When Frye was injured against the Denver Broncos, Russell played near the end of the game. The game resulted in a win. He finished the 2009 season with the lowest quarterback rating, lowest completion percentage, fewest passing touchdowns, and fewest passing yards among qualifying quarterbacks in the NFL.

The coaches sent Russell a DVD with game plans to study. They suspected that Russell wasn't watching his homework so they provided him with a blank DVD. Russell came back from home and told the coaches that the game plan looked good to him. Russell's work ethic was poor in Oakland and he fell asleep in meetings and failed to show up for organized team activities.

In March of the 2010 offseason, NBC Sports described Russell as "annually and incredibly overweight", saying Russell, often criticized for a perceived lack of conditioning, arrived at mini-camp weighing 290 pounds, up from his initially reported weight of 271. By April, National Football Post reported him at 300 pounds. However, Cam Inman of the Oakland Tribune said that Russell had "a good first minicamp" and "is in great shape" in the team's first training camp in late April. In an interview during camp, Russell said "Today I'm going to keep coming out, compete for the job, work my tail off."

That same month, the Raiders traded for Washington Redskins quarterback Jason Campbell, which left the team with five quarterbacks on the roster: Campbell, Russell, Frye, Gradkowski, and Kyle Boller. At the time, Cable said Russell could compete for the starting job. On May 6, 2010, the Raiders released Russell.

The Raiders filed a grievance on May 28, 2010, seeking $9.55 million back from Russell for what was paid as salary advances for the 2010 to 2012 NFL seasons. His agent said "The money in question was fully guaranteed. That is why Russell was forced to hold out and miss all of training camp as a rookie. The Raiders know that and this is our only comment." Russell subsequently filed a grievance against the Raiders, asserting he was owed an additional $9 million from the team, and the parties settled the complaints in 2013 with the Raiders paying Russell an extra $3 million.

=== Post-football ===
New Orleans Saints head coach Sean Payton said in May 2010 that the time was not right for the Saints to consider signing Russell, but added in that it was "newsworthy" when a high draft pick is released so soon, and said players like Russell often get second chances in the NFL. However, due in part to concerns about his work ethic, Russell has never played another down in an NFL game. On September 26, 2010, ESPN.com reported that Russell had moved to Houston, Texas, and was working out with former NBA standout and head coach John Lucas, who was also consulting him as a life coach. Russell had a workout with the Washington Redskins on November 2, 2010, but was not signed. On November 15, 2010, Russell, who at the time was at 292 pounds, worked out for the Miami Dolphins with four other quarterbacks to replace an injured Chad Pennington on the Dolphins' roster. Patrick Ramsey was eventually signed. In January 2011, Lucas attempted to arrange a meeting for Russell with Baltimore Ravens president Ozzie Newsome when the Ravens executive was in Mobile, Alabama, for the Senior Bowl; however, Newsome refused to meet with Russell. In April 2011, Lucas, who had become frustrated with Russell's work ethic, reportedly severed all ties with Russell and asked him to leave the Houston area.

In 2013, Russell stated that he was interested in returning to the NFL, and would train at the Test Football Academy in Martinsville, New Jersey with various NFL players, including Marshall Faulk and Jeff Garcia, along with Olympian Ato Boldon. Russell's comeback attempt was documented by Bleacher Report in a series titled JaMarcus Russell's Road Back to the NFL. In May 2013, NFL Network's Ian Rapoport reported Russell had returned to his rookie weight of 265 pounds. Interest from the Chicago Bears and Baltimore Ravens had also been reported. Russell tried out for the Bears on June 7, 2013, and, according to a report from ESPN, presented a "solid" performance while working out alongside fellow free-agent quarterbacks Trent Edwards and Jordan Palmer. The Bears did not sign him, stating they were not interested in adding a fourth quarterback to the roster. However, the Bears did sign both Edwards and Palmer two months later. In April 2016, Russell told Sports Illustrated that he had written letters to all 32 NFL teams asking for a tryout and pledging to be a water boy or run the scout team for free if it meant getting another shot in the NFL, although no team responded to the letters.

=== Impact ===
NFL.com's Steve Wyche claimed that Russell is the biggest draft bust in NFL history. The Huffington Post named him one of the 13 biggest draft busts of the 2000s. ESPN's Bill Williamson called Russell a "talented but extremely disappointing" quarterback. In addition, Russell's 2009 passer rating of 50.0 was the lowest rating by a starting quarterback in the NFL since 1998. His final stats during his tenure as a Raider were 52.1% pass completion, 18–23 TD–INT ratio, a passer rating of 65.2, and fumbled 25 times, 15 of those were lost fumbles.

No Oakland player wore Russell's #2 jersey number during the regular season for several years after his release; punter Marquette King wore it during Oakland's 2012 preseason before being placed on season-ending injured reserve. In 2011, newly drafted quarterback Terrelle Pryor's request to wear #2 was turned down by then-coach Hue Jackson, and Ann Killion from Sports Illustrated said it was to avoid comparisons to Russell. However, in 2013, Raiders coach Dennis Allen allowed Pryor to trade numbers with King beginning in training camp.

In June 2022, after spending many years out of public eye, Russell wrote a personal essay for The Players Tribune, titled "Y'all Don't Know a Damn Thing About Jamarcus Russell". In the piece, he addressed his lean consumption during his LSU career, his family, and his "bust" designation.

== Career statistics ==
Legend
**Bold**	Career high

=== NFL ===
Year	Team	Games			Passing									Rushing					Sacks		Fumbles	
Year	Team	GP	GS	Record	Cmp	Att	Pct	Yds	Y/A	TD	Int	Rtg	Lng	Att	Yds	Avg	TD	Lng	Sck	Yds	Fum	Lost
2007	OAK	4	1	0–1	36	66	**54.5**	373	5.7	2	4	55.9	32T	5	4	0.8	0	7	6	40	4	2
2008	OAK	15	15	**5–10**	**198**	**368**	53.8	**2,423**	**6.6**	**13**	8	**77.1**	84T	17	**127**	**7.5**	**1**	**24**	31	**210**	**12**	**7**
2009	OAK	12	9	2–7	120	246	48.8	1,287	5.2	3	**11**	50.0	**86T**	**18**	44	2.4	0	15	**33**	207	9	6
Career		31	25	7–18	354	680	52.1	4,083	6.0	18	23	65.2	86T	40	175	4.4	1	24	70	457	25	15

=== College ===
Season	Team	GP	Passing					
Season	Team	GP	Cmp	Att	Pct	Yds	TD	Int
2003	LSU	Redshirt						
2004	LSU	11	73	144	50.7	1,053	9	4
2005	LSU	12	188	311	60.5	2,443	15	**9**
2006	LSU	13	**232**	**342**	**67.8**	**3,129**	**28**	8
College		36	493	797	61.9	6,625	52	21

== Awards and honors ==
- Columbus Touchdown Club SEC Player of the Year (2005)
- 4× SEC Offensive Player of the Week (1 in 2005, 3 in 2006)
- First-team All-SEC by the Associated Press and SEC coaches (2006)
- Manning Award (2006)
- Davey O'Brien Award semifinalist (2006)

== Personal life ==
Russell's uncle Ray Ray Russell was a long-time DJ and radio host for the Mobile, Alabama-based station WBLX until his death in 2009. In 2011, his cousin DeAngelo Parker started Ray Ray's Chicken and Waffles franchise in honor of him in Mobile, Alabama. In an ESPN feature produced in 2013, Russell later recalled not having the time to properly grieve the deaths of Ray Ray and his other uncle, which occurred within months of each other, and he never told the Raiders of his mental anguish during his disastrous 2009 season.

In the aftermath of Hurricane Katrina, Russell housed around a dozen evacuees who had fled the flooding in New Orleans, including New Orleans singer Fats Domino, in his off-campus apartment.

=== Codeine syrup possession arrest ===
On July 5, 2010, Russell was arrested at his Mobile, Alabama home for being in possession of codeine syrup without a valid prescription. His arrest was the culmination of a two-month investigation that did not initially target Russell, but his name and address surfaced repeatedly during the investigation. Russell was bailed out, and a bond hearing was scheduled for July 7, 2010. At his July 20, 2010, arraignment, Russell pleaded 'not guilty' to a state felony charge of possession of a controlled substance. On October 29, 2010, a Mobile County grand jury declined to indict Russell on the charge of possession of codeine syrup without a prescription. By at least one account, the arrest severely diminished his prospects of catching on with another NFL team.

Rumors of "purple drank" use by Russell had been noted by local journalists for some time during his tenure with the Raiders, but not reported due to the lack of evidence or corroboration. In an interview with ESPN's Colleen Dominguez, Russell stated that he tested positive for codeine after he was selected by the Raiders in the 2007 NFL draft.

=== Donation theft lawsuit ===
On June 29, 2024, it was reported that Russell was facing a lawsuit in which he was accused of taking a $74,000 check that was meant for the Williamson High School football program, his alma mater. Russell, who had been a volunteer assistant coach at Williamson since 2018, was fired from this position in the fall of 2023. Russell allegedly approached the donor in the summer of 2022 about a donation to purchase weight room equipment for the Williamson football team. Russell received a check for $74,000 from the donor in July 2022, deposited it at a credit union, and immediately withdrew $55,000. The donor eventually stopped payment on the check when Russell wouldn't provide a receipt of the donation and stopped returning his phone calls. The case went to trial in October 2024. Russell lost the lawsuit and was ordered to pay back over $72,000.
