= Rhema McKnight =

American football player (born 1984)

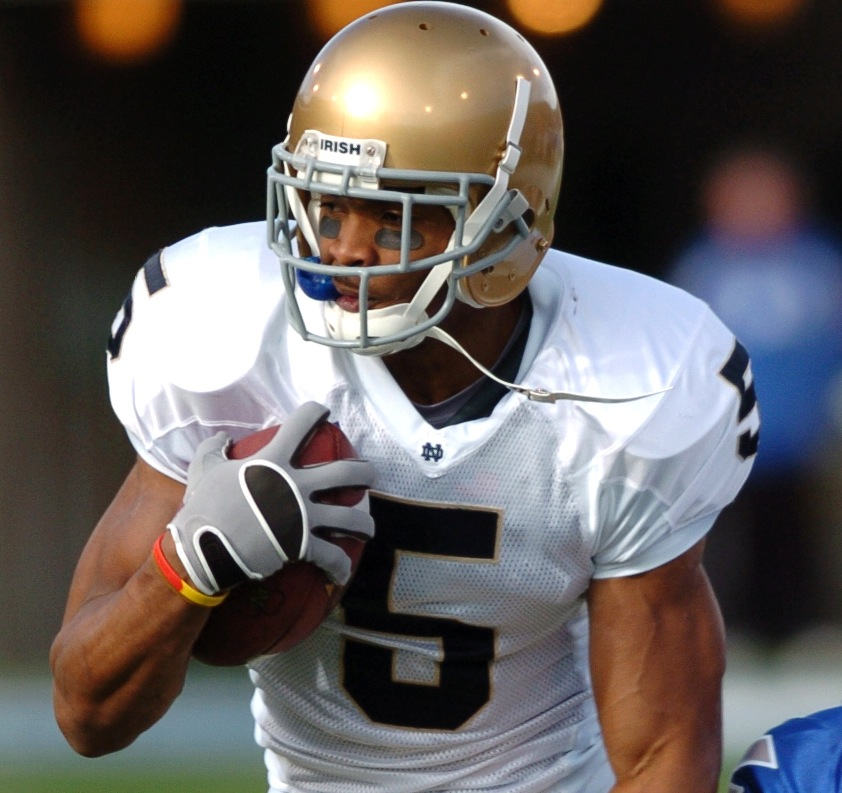
- McKnight while playing for Notre Dame

No. 5
- Position: Wide receiver

Personal information
- Born: March 6, 1984 (age 42); Inglewood, California
- Listed height: 6 ft 2 in (1.88 m)
- Listed weight: 212 lb (96 kg)

Career information
- High school: John F. Kennedy (La Palma, California)
- College: Notre Dame
- NFL draft: 2007: undrafted

Career history
- New Orleans Saints (2007)*; San Diego Chargers (2007)*
- * Offseason or practice squad member only

Rhema Lee McKnight (born March 6, 1984) is a former wide receiver for the University of Notre Dame's American football team and signed with the New Orleans Saints as an undrafted free agent on April 29, 2007. He was subsequently waived on August 2, 2007, and picked up by the San Diego Chargers off waivers and later released on August 28, 2007.

== High school ==
McKnight went to John F. Kennedy High School, in La Palma, California. He first started playing football during his sophomore year but basketball was his favorite sport. He originally played WR but was forced to play QB by his senior year because he was double and triple teamed at the WR position. According to rivals.com McKnight was rated the 5th most talented individual at wide receiver in the country, and rated the 42 overall player nationally. He was one of several Notre Dame Fighting Irish recruits to play in the 2002 U.S. Army All-American Bowl along with Anthony Fasano, Maurice Stovall, Chris Frome, and Marcus Freeman.

== College ==
Among the top wide receiver recruits according to numerous recruiting resources, McKnight had 103 receptions for 1370 yards over his first four years at Notre Dame. After suffering a devastating knee injury early in 2005, McKnight was granted a fifth-year of eligibility by the NCAA and finished the year with 67 receptions for 907 yards and 15 TDs.
