= Jeff Samardzija =

American baseball player (born 1985)

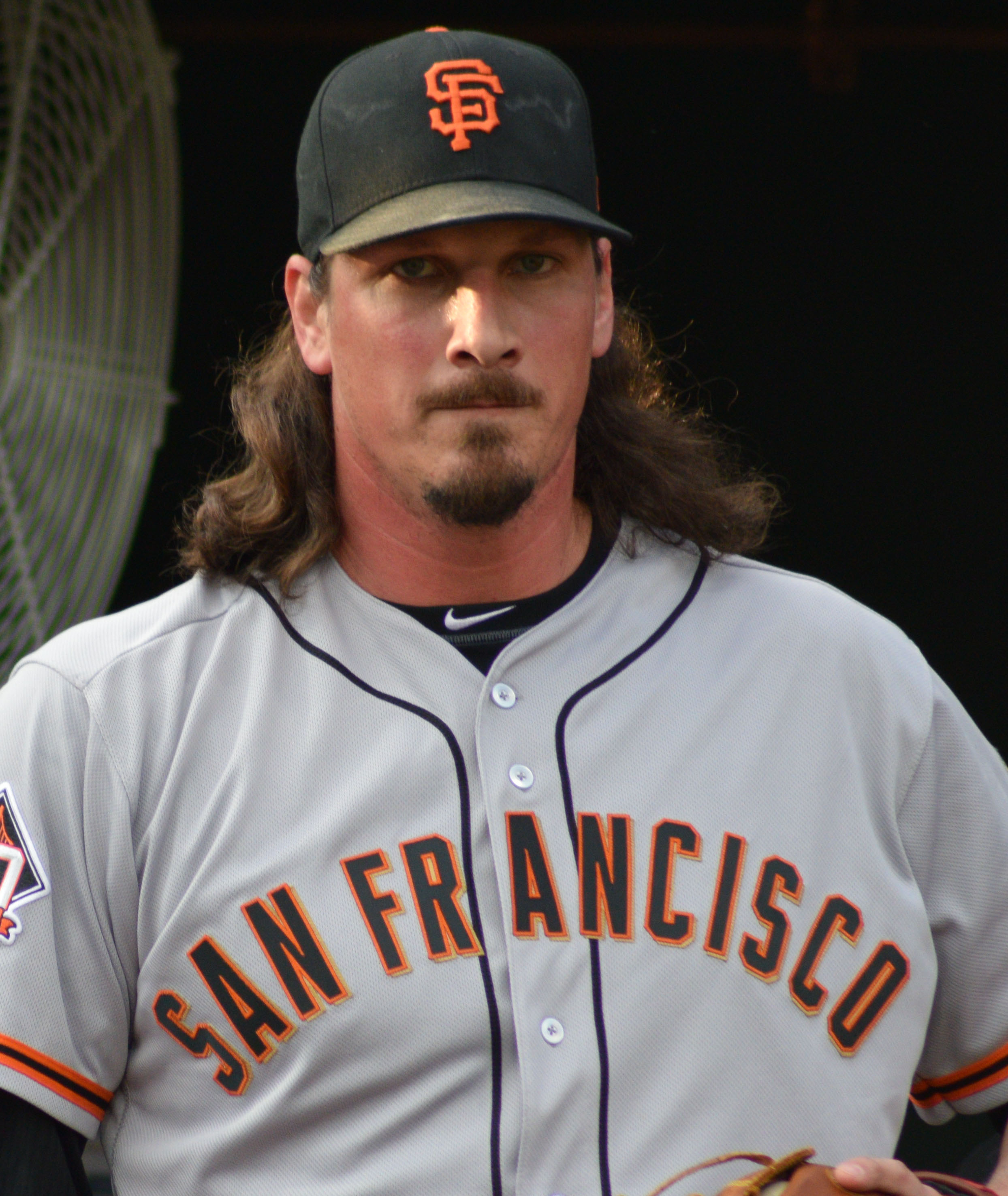
- Samardzija with the San Francisco Giants in 2018
- Pitcher
- Born: January 23, 1985 (age 41); Merrillville, Indiana, U.S.
- Batted: Right Threw: Right

MLB debut
- July 25, 2008, for the Chicago Cubs

Last MLB appearance
- September 25, 2020, for the San Francisco Giants

MLB statistics
- Win–loss record: 80–106
- Earned run average: 4.15
- Strikeouts: 1,449
- Stats at Baseball Reference

Teams
- Chicago Cubs (2008–2014); Oakland Athletics (2014); Chicago White Sox (2015); San Francisco Giants (2016–2020)

Career highlights and awards
- All-Star (2014)
Football career
Profile
Position	Wide receiver
Career information
High school	Valparaiso
College	Notre Dame (2003–2006)
Awards and highlights
2× All-American (2005, 2006)

Jeffrey Alan Samardzija (/səˈmərdʒijə/; born January 23, 1985), nicknamed "Shark", is an American former professional baseball pitcher. He played college baseball and football for the University of Notre Dame, and was recognized as a two-time football All-American playing wide receiver and a two-time Baseball All-American as a pitcher. He was selected by the Chicago Cubs in the fifth round of the 2006 Major League Baseball draft, and made his major-league (MLB) debut in 2008. He played in MLB for the Chicago Cubs from 2008 to 2014, the Oakland Athletics in 2014, the Chicago White Sox in 2015, and the San Francisco Giants from 2016 to 2020. He was an All-Star in 2014.

== Early life ==
Jeffrey Alan Samardzija was born on January 23, 1985, in Merrillville, Indiana. Samardzija's father, Sam Samardzija, was a professional hockey player, and his older brother, Sam Samardzija Jr., Samardzija's current agent, was an All State football and baseball player who graduated from Indiana University and is now the Senior Vice President at Wasserman Baseball. His paternal grandparents emigrated from Serbia. When Samardzija was in high school his mother, Debora Samardzija, died from a rare respiratory disease.

Samardzija grew up in Valparaiso, Indiana, where he attended Valparaiso High School, and was a letterman in football, basketball, and baseball. In football, he was a three-time first team All-State honoree, and was twice named the team's Most Valuable Player. After his junior year, he was invited to participate in the Indiana football All-Star game. In baseball, he was a first team All-State honoree. He graduated from Valparaiso High School in 2003.

== College career ==
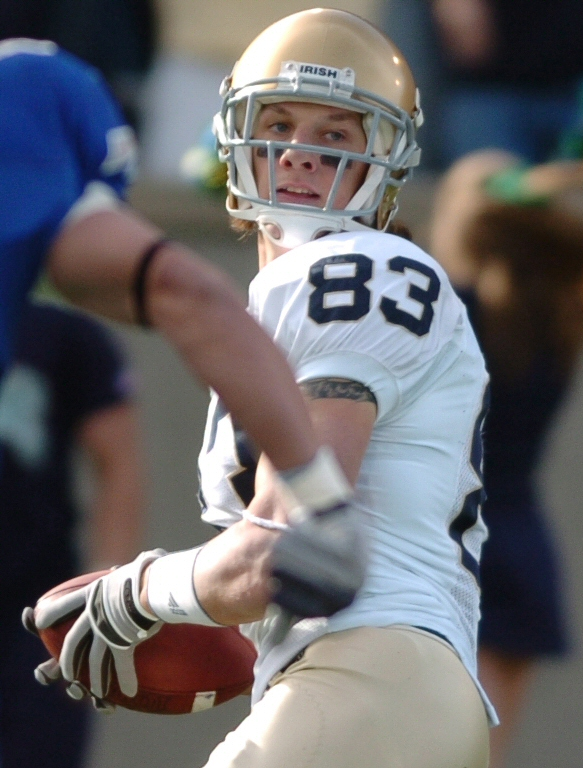
Samardzija playing for the Notre Dame Fighting Irish football team in 2006

Samardzija accepted an athletic scholarship to attend the University of Notre Dame, where he played for the Fighting Irish football team from 2003 to 2006, and baseball team from 2004 to 2006.

He made his first impact at Notre Dame as a right-handed pitcher for the baseball team, finishing second in the Big East Conference in both earned run average (ERA) (2.95) and opponents' batting average (.209), and being named a Freshman All-American by Collegiate Baseball Magazine. He continued to play baseball at Notre Dame until he was selected by the Chicago Cubs in the fifth round (149th overall) of the 2006 Major League Baseball draft.

In football, he was a reserve for his first two seasons, catching a total of 24 passes. He first started at the 2004 Insight Bowl at the end of his sophomore season. He emerged as a star in the 2005 season, ending the regular season with 77 catches – 15 of them for touchdowns – for 1,215 yards and making numerous All-America Teams.

Samardzija set single-season school records in both receiving yardage and touchdown receptions. He caught a touchdown pass in each of Notre Dame's first eight games in 2006, giving him the school record for consecutive games with a touchdown reception. He made 78 catches for 1,017 yards and 12 touchdowns in 13 games in the 2006 season to finish as the all-time Fighting Irish leader in reception yards with 2,593. He made the Football Writers Association of America All-America Team following the 2006 season.

Samardzija was twice selected as one of the three finalists for the Fred Biletnikoff Award, for the season's outstanding college football receiver in both 2005 and 2006. Although initially planning to play both in the NFL and MLB, Samardzija announced after being selected in the Major League Draft that he would take his name out of the NFL draft and play baseball.

== Professional career ==
=== Draft and minor leagues ===
On January 19, 2007, Samardzija announced he would forgo the NFL Draft and commit to a baseball career. Samardzija signed a five-year deal to play baseball with the Chicago Cubs after he was drafted in the fifth round of the 2006 MLB draft. The deal had both a no-trade clause and a club option for a sixth and seventh year. If the club option was exercised, the total value of the deal would have been $16.5 million. The deal included a $1 million signing bonus.

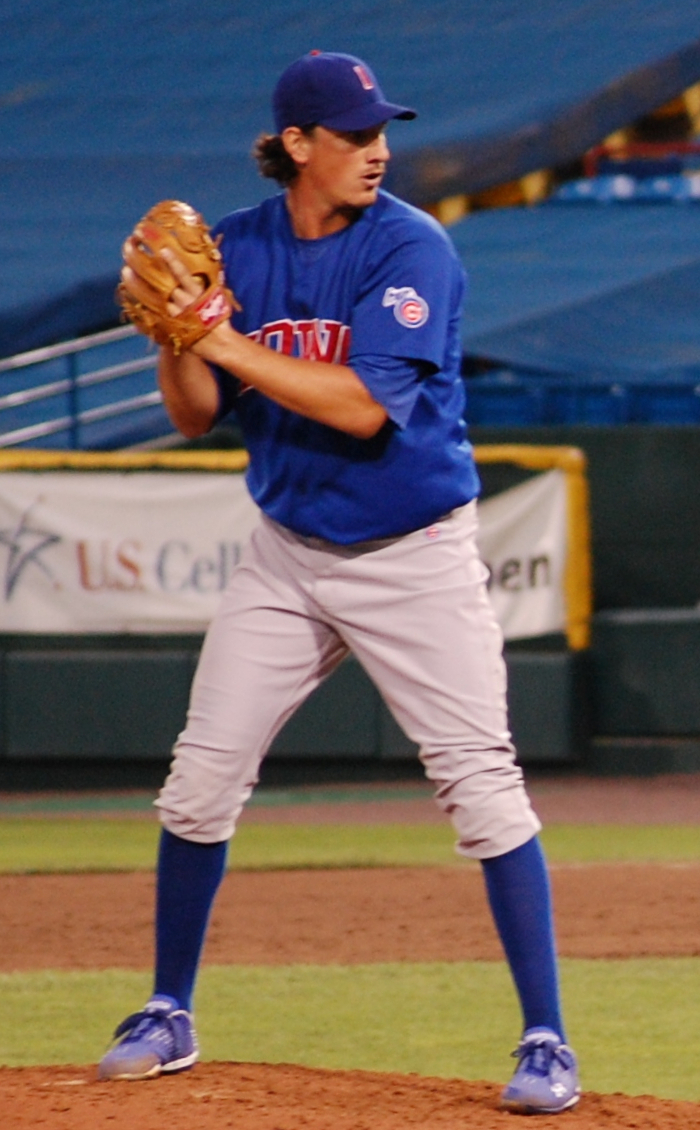
Samardzija pitching for the Iowa Cubs in 2010

On June 23, 2008, Samardzija was promoted to Triple-A Iowa after posting a 3–5 record in Tennessee with a 4.86 ERA. In his career in Triple-A Iowa, he posted a 4–1 record and a 3.13 ERA with 40 strikeouts and 16 walks.

=== Chicago Cubs (2008–2014) ===
On July 25, 2008, Samardzija was called up to join the bullpen of the Chicago Cubs to replace Kerry Wood, who was placed on the DL.

He made his MLB debut the same day against the Florida Marlins, striking out the first batter he faced in the 7th inning. Chicago Cubs Manager Lou Piniella was impressed with Samardzija's major league debut, saying he may never see the minors again. On July 27, 2008, Samardzija recorded his first career major league save against the Florida Marlins.

In 2009, Samardzija was optioned to the Triple-A Iowa Cubs after failing to make the team out of spring training. However, he was quickly called back up only a few games into the season. He quickly returned to Des Moines to pitch for the Iowa Cubs, after posting an 8.10 ERA in 5 appearances. He made his first major league start on August 12 against Pedro Martínez of the Philadelphia Phillies, a 12–5 loss.

In March 2010, Samardzija returned to the Cubs and pitched his first game in exhibition on March 13, 2010. He pitched in four regular season games in April and compiled an 18.90 ERA before being sent back down to the Triple-A Iowa Cubs in order to make space for Ted Lilly on the Cubs roster.

In 2011, Samardzija made the opening day roster as a reliever. During the 2011 season Samardzija, statistically had one of his best seasons posting an 8–4 record with an ERA of 2.97

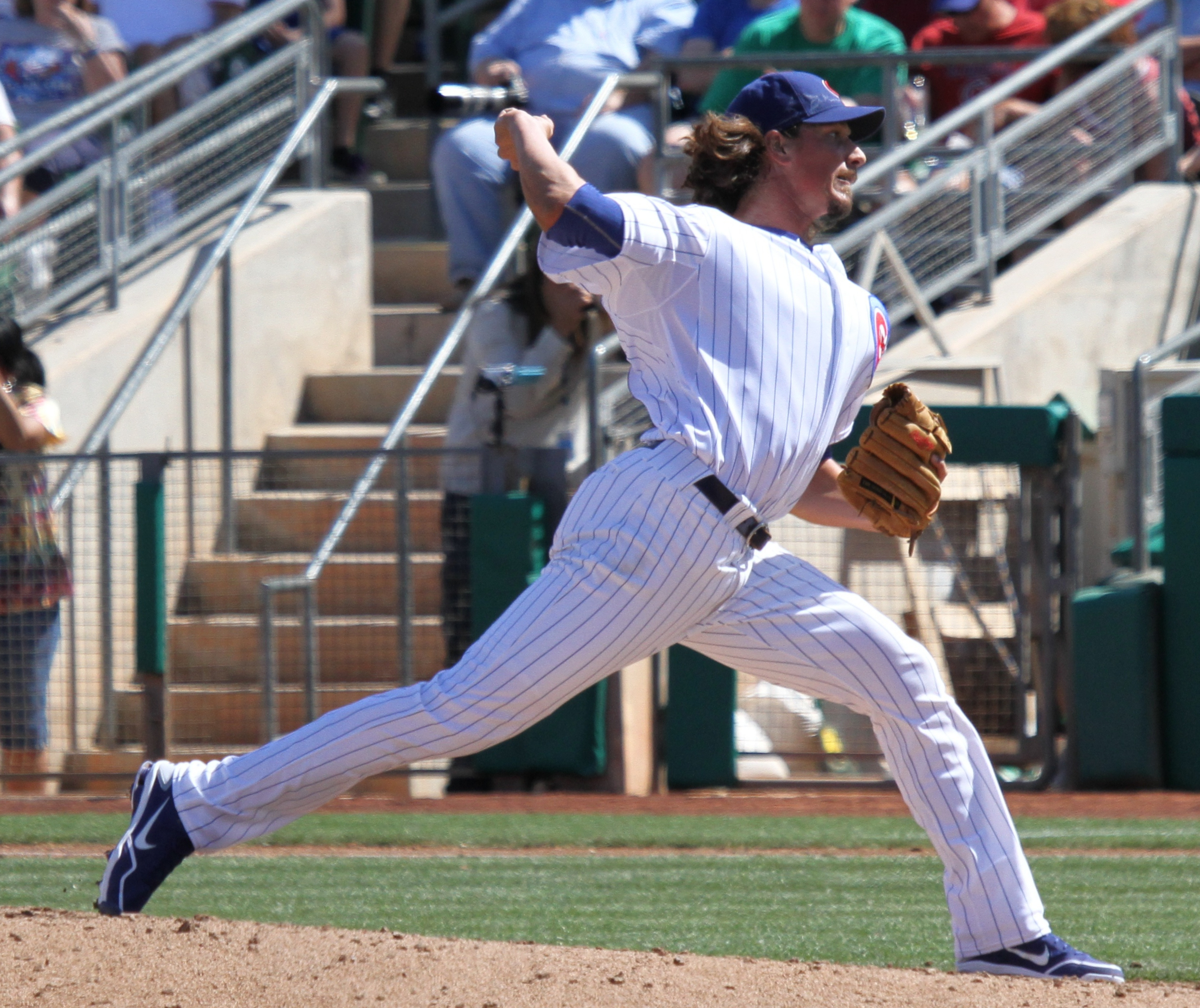
Samardzija pitching for the Chicago Cubs in 2012 spring training

In 2012, Samardzija was named a starter in the Cubs rotation and was solid going 9–13 with a 3.81 ERA and 180 strikeouts.

On March 3, 2013, Samardzija was named the opening day starter. He threw his first major league shutout on May 27, 2013, against the Chicago White Sox, allowing two hits and two walks. He was named National League Co-Player of the Week for August 19–25, 2013, after recording a 2–0 record and 1.59 ERA in 17 innings pitched.

He began 2014 as a hardluck pitcher. He set a major league record for lowest ERA (1.46) by a winless pitcher through his first 10 starts. The 1.46 ERA was the latest league-leading ERA by a winless pitcher since Bruce Sutter's 0.89 ERA on June 7, 1977. Samardzija won his eleventh start of the season by striking out a season-high 10 San Francisco Giants. On June 18, 2014, the Cubs offered Samardzija a five-year, club friendly deal that included multiple option years, which he rejected.

On July 6, 2014, he was selected as a National League All-Star but was not eligible to play because he was traded to an American League team.

=== Oakland Athletics (2014) ===
On July 5, 2014, Samardzija, along with Jason Hammel, was traded to the Oakland Athletics in exchange for top shortstop prospect Addison Russell, pitcher Dan Straily, outfielder Billy McKinney, and cash. In his debut on July 6, he went seven innings with five strikeouts, allowing one run and four hits.

=== Chicago White Sox (2015) ===
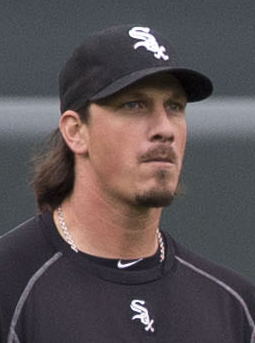
Samardzija with the Chicago White Sox in 2015

On December 9, 2014, the Athletics traded Samardzija along with Michael Ynoa to the Chicago White Sox in exchange for Marcus Semien, Chris Bassitt, Rangel Ravelo and Josh Phegley. Samardzija and the White Sox avoided arbitration by agreeing to a one-year deal for $9.8 million on January 16, 2015.

Samardzija made his first start for the White Sox on April 6, 2015, during opening day against the Kansas City Royals. He allowed 5 runs including a home run by Alex Ríos in 6 innings as the White Sox lost to the Royals, 10–1. During another game against the Royals on April 23, Samardzija was one of five players to be ejected for his role in a bench-clearing brawl. On April 25, Samardzija was suspended 5 games. On July 9, he pitched a complete-game shutout and allowed only four hits in a 2–0 victory over the Toronto Blue Jays at US Cellular Field. This was his first complete-game shutout victory for the White Sox and the second of his major league career. On September 21, Samardzija pitched a complete-game one-hit shutout against the Detroit Tigers on only 88 pitches; the only baserunner was Victor Martinez, who singled to lead off the fifth inning, and no batter's count went to three balls. Despite the strong finish, Samardzija tied for the American League lead in home runs allowed (29) and led the league in earned runs allowed (118). Overall, Samardzija finished 11–13 with a 4.96 ERA. After the season, Samardzija revealed that he had been inadvertently tipping his pitches, leading to his poor performance.

=== San Francisco Giants (2016–2020) ===
On December 9, 2015, Samardzija signed a five-year, $90 million contract with the San Francisco Giants. He was selected as an alternate for 2017 World Baseball Classic, although he would not be included on the final rosters. He earned his first win as a Giant on April 13, 2016, yielding only two earned runs and six hits in 8 innings pitched at Coors Field. Samardzija earned his first home win as a Giant on April 22, pitching 7 2/3 innings while giving up only one earned run against the Miami Marlins. Samardzija also matched his career-high for a season of 3 RBIs in the game. In his first season as a Giant, Samardzija was fifth in the National League with 203.1 innings pitched and finished 2016 with a 12–11 record and a 3.81 ERA. The 12 wins were a career high and it was his first winning season since he became a full-time starter in 2012.

Samardzija pitched his first shutout as a Giant and third of his career on August 28, 2017, blanking the San Diego Padres 3–0. He was named National League Player of the Week for August 28 – September 3, 2017, after recording a 1–0 record, including the shutout, and 0.56 ERA in 16 innings pitched. Samardzija finished the 2017 season with a National League leading 207.2 innings pitched, finished sixth in the National League in strikeouts with 205 and led the major leagues with the lowest bases on balls per 9 innings pitched (1.387). However, he finished with a 9–15 record and a 4.43 ERA. The 15 losses tied for the National League lead.

At the start of the 2018 season, he was placed on the disabled list with a strained pectoral muscle. He was placed on the disabled list for a third time on July 15 with shoulder inflammation. He finished the season 1–5 in 10 starts.

In 2019 he was 11–12 with 3.52 ERA, as he started 32 games (8th in the NL) and pitched 181.2 innings. He was 10th in the National League in WHIP (1.108) and in hits per 9 innings pitched (7.544).

On September 26, 2020, Samardzija was designated for assignment by the Giants and placed on release waivers. In 2020 for the Giants, Samardzija pitched to an 0–2 record with a 9.72 ERA, allowing 18 earned runs over 16.2 innings pitched.

== Pitching style ==
Samardzija has thrown as many as seven types of pitches in his career, but as of 2016, he used six. They are as follows: a four-seam fastball (93–97 mph), two-seam fastball (94–99), cutter (91–93), slider (84–86), splitter (85–87) and a curveball (79–82). He is comfortable throwing all of his pitches for strikes. Against right-handed and left-handed hitters, the splitter is by a wide margin his most commonly thrown pitch in 2-strike counts. As of August 2016, Samardzija re-inserted the curveball into his repertoire, a pitch he had not used in almost 4 years.

== Personal life ==
Samardzija is of Serbian descent; his grandparents emigrated to the United States in the 1940s. He was nicknamed "Shark" by teammates during his career at Notre Dame.
