= Marcus Freeman (tight end) =

American football player (born 1983)

No. 82
- Position: Tight end

Personal information
- Born: October 24, 1983 (age 43); Saint Paul, Minnesota, U.S.
- Listed height: 6 ft 2 in (1.88 m)
- Listed weight: 246 lb (112 kg)

Career information
- High school: Saint Paul (MN) Cretin-Derham Hall
- College: Notre Dame (2002–2006)
- NFL draft: 2007: undrafted

Career history
- Baltimore Ravens (2007)*; Carolina Panthers (2007); New York Giants (2007)*
- * Offseason or practice squad member only

Marcus Leon Freeman (born October 24, 1983) is an American former football tight end. He was originally signed by the Carolina Panthers as an undrafted free agent in 2007, he went to the Giants later that year. He played college football at Notre Dame. Although his football career was cut short, in the year he played for the Giants, the team won the Super Bowl against the undefeated Patriots, thus he has a Super Bowl ring in addition to his various licenses and degrees.

== Educator ==
Freeman retired from football after the 2007 season and became an educator in the St. Paul, MN school district where he has served for 12 years as an educational assistant, long-term substitute teacher, a dean of students, activities director, as assistant principal for Ramsey Middle School, head principal at Galtier Community school, and he is currently the principal at Capitol Hill Gifted and Talented Magnet School.

== Education ==
Freeman earned a Bachelor of Science degree in marketing from the University of Notre Dame, a Master of Educational Leadership from St. Mary's University of Minnesota and an Educational Administration K-12 Principal Licensure from St. Mary's University of Minnesota.
