= Carl Gioia =

American football player (born 1985)

Profile
- Position: Placekicker

Personal information
- Born: January 24, 1985 (age 41)

Career information
- High school: Valparaiso
- College: Notre Dame (2003–2007)

Carl Daniel Gioia, born January 24, 1985, is a former football placekicker. He played college football for the University of Notre Dame.

== Early life ==
Gioia attended Valparaiso High School in Valparaiso, Indiana and was a good student and a letterman in football. In football, he was a four-year letterman, was named as an All-State selection by the Indiana Football Coaches Association for three years, and as a senior, he was also named as an IFCA Academic All-State selection, named as a National Football Foundation Scholar-Athlete, and was selected as the Indiana Mister Football Kicker Position Award. Carl Daniel Gioia graduated from Valparaiso High School in 2003.

== College career ==
Gioia played college football for Notre Dame from 2003 to 2007. He finished his last season as the third-leading scorer on the team with 73 points.

== Post-college ==
Following his college career at Notre Dame, Gioia attended dental school at the University of Louisville. After graduating at the top of his class, he entered into Louisville's Orthodontics Residency Program. He later practiced orthodontics in Louisville, KY.
