= 2008 Oakland Raiders season =

NFL team season

- Owner: Al Davis
- General manager: Al Davis
- Head coach: Lane Kiffin (fired September 30, 1-3 record); Tom Cable (interim, 4-8 record)
- Home stadium: Oakland–Alameda County Coliseum

Results
- Record: 5–11
- Division place: 3rd AFC West
- Playoffs: Did not qualify
- Pro Bowlers: Nnamdi Asomugha, CB; Shane Lechler, P

The 2008 Oakland Raiders season was the 49th overall season of the Oakland Raiders franchise, the franchise's 39th season in the National Football League (NFL), their 14th season since their return to Oakland and the second and final season under head coach Lane Kiffin, who was fired on September 30 after a 1–3 start. Offensive line coach Tom Cable served as interim head coach for the rest of the season. The Raiders improved upon their 4–12 record from 2007. This was also the first time in four seasons that the Raiders did not play both contestants from the previous Super Bowl, playing the New England Patriots, but not the New York Giants. This was also the first time in five seasons the team did not finish last in their division but stood alone at third instead. (Note: The Raiders had shared the spot with the Kansas City Chiefs during the previous season.)

== Offseason ==
=== Notable roster losses ===
- QB Josh McCown – Signed with Dolphins During Free Agency
- QB Daunte Culpepper – Signed with Lions During Free Agency
- RB LaMont Jordan – Signed with Patriots During Free Agency
- RB Dominic Rhodes – Signed with Colts During Free Agency
- RB ReShard Lee – Released
- WR Jerry Porter – Signed with Jaguars During Free Agency
- WR Tim Dwight – Did not Signed
- OT Barry Sims – Signed with 49ers During Free Agency
- C Jeremy Newberry – Signed with Chargers During Free Agency
- DE Chris Clemons – Signed with Eagles During Free Agency
- DE Tyler Brayton – Signed with Panthers During Free Agency
- DT Warren Sapp – Retired on March 4, 2008
- OLB Grant Irons
- ILB Edgerton Hartwell – released
- CB Fabian Washington – Traded to Ravens for a fourth round pick
- CB Chris Carr – Signed with Titans During Free Agency
- S Stuart Schweigert – Signed with Giants During Free Agency
- S Greg Wesley – released
- S Jarrod Cooper – released

=== Notable roster gains ===
- WR Javon Walker – Signed as a free agent (previously with Denver Broncos)
- OT Kwame Harris – Signed as a free agent (previously with San Francisco 49ers)
- C John Wade – Signed as a free agent (previously with Tampa Bay Buccaneers)
- CB DeAngelo Hall – Acquired from Atlanta Falcons in a trade (released on November 5, 2008, after 8 games)
- S Gibril Wilson – Signed as a free agent (previously with New York Giants)

=== 2008 Draft Board ===
Round	Selection	Player	Position	College
1	4	Darren McFadden	RB	Arkansas
4	100	Tyvon Branch	CB	Connecticut
4	125	Arman Shields	WR	Richmond
6	169	Trevor Scott	DE	Buffalo
7	226	Chaz Schilens	WR	San Diego State

== Staff ==
Oakland Raiders 2008 coaching staff
Front office: President/Managing General Partner – Al Davis; Head coaches: Head coach – Lane Kiffin; Offensive coaches: Offensive coordinator – Greg Knapp; Quarterbacks – John DeFilippo; Running backs – Tom Rathman; Wide receivers – James Lofton; Tight ends – Kelly Skipper; Interim head coach/Offensive line – Tom Cable; Assistant offensive line – James Cregg; Offensive quality control – Adam Henry; Offensive quality control – Sanjay Lal	Defensive coaches: Defensive coordinator – Rob Ryan; Defensive line – Keith Millard; Assistant defensive line – Don Johnson; Linebackers – Don Martindale; Defensive backs – Darren Perry; Defensive backs/squad development – Willie Brown; Assistant defensive backs – Randy Hanson; Defensive quality control – George Martinez; Special teams coaches: Special teams coordinator – Brian Schneider; Special teams quality control – John Fassel; Strength and conditioning: Strength and conditioning – Brad Roll

== Roster ==
2008 Oakland Raiders roster
Quarterbacks (QB): 2 JaMarcus Russell; 8 Marques Tuiasosopo; 16 Andrew Walter; Running backs (RB): 29 Michael Bush; 25 Justin Fargas; 44 Luke Lawton FB; 20 Darren McFadden; 41 Louis Rankin; 45 Marcel Reece FB; Wide receivers (WR): 89 Ronald Curry; 15 Johnnie Lee Higgins; 10 Jonathan Holland; 81 Chaz Schilens; 19 Todd Watkins; Tight ends (TE): 80 Zach Miller; 86 Tony Stewart; 82 Darrell Strong	Offensive linemen (OL): 66 Cooper Carlisle G; 76 Robert Gallery G; 74 Cornell Green T; 64 Jake Grove C; 77 Kwame Harris T; 75 Mario Henderson T; 69 James Marten T; 51 Chris Morris C/G; 71 John Wade C; Defensive linemen (DL): 56 Derrick Burgess DE; 58 Kalimba Edwards DE; 97 Greyson Gunheim DE; 96 William Joseph DT; 93 Tommy Kelly DT; 98 Jay Richardson DE; 90 Terdell Sands DT; 91 Trevor Scott DE; 61 Gerard Warren DT	Linebackers (LB): 55 Jon Alston OLB; 95 Marquis Cooper OLB; 50 Isaiah Ekejiuba MLB; 53 Thomas Howard OLB; 52 Kirk Morrison MLB; 54 Sam Williams OLB; Defensive backs (DB): 21 Nnamdi Asomugha CB; 27 Rashad Baker FS; 39 Darrick Brown CB; 31 Hiram Eugene FS; 24 Michael Huff FS/SS; 37 Chris Johnson CB; 22 Justin Miller CB/KR; 26 Stanford Routt CB; 28 Gibril Wilson SS; Special teams (ST): 59 Jon Condo LS; 11 Sebastian Janikowski K; 9 Shane Lechler P	Practice squad: 62 Robert Felton G; 92 Derrick Gray DE; 17 D. J. Hall WR; 7 Jeff Otis QB; 4 Ricky Schmitt P; 70 Brandon Torrey T; Reserve: 35 John Bowie CB (IR); 33 Tyvon Branch S (IR); 57 Ricky Brown LB (IR); 18 Drew Carter WR (IR); 36 Justin Griffith FB (IR); 87 Ashley Lelie WR (IR); 79 Paul McQuistan T (IR); 46 Oren O'Neal FB (IR); -- Arman Shields WR (IR); 84 Javon Walker WR (IR); 63 Mark Wilson T (IR); Rookies in italics 53 active, 11 reserve, 6 practice squad

== Preseason ==
=== Schedule ===
Week	Date	Opponent	Result	Record	Venue	Recap
1	August 8	San Francisco 49ers	W 18–6	1–0	McAfee Coliseum	Recap
2	August 15	Tennessee Titans	L 17–16	1–1	LP Field	Recap
3	August 23	Arizona Cardinals	L 24–0	1–2	McAfee Coliseum	Recap
4	August 29	Seattle Seahawks	L 16–23	1–3	Qwest Field	Recap

== Regular season ==
=== Schedule ===
Week	Date	Opponent	Result	Record	Venue	Recap
1	September 8	Denver Broncos	L 14–41	0–1	McAfee Coliseum	Recap
2	September 14	at Kansas City Chiefs	W 23–8	1–1	Arrowhead Stadium	Recap
3	September 21	at Buffalo Bills	L 23–24	1–2	Ralph Wilson Stadium	Recap
4	September 28	San Diego Chargers	L 18–28	1–3	Oakland–Alameda County Coliseum	Recap
5	Bye					
6	October 12	at New Orleans Saints	L 3–34	1–4	Louisiana Superdome	Recap
7	October 19	New York Jets	W 16–13	2–4	Oakland–Alameda County Coliseum	Recap
8	October 26	at Baltimore Ravens	L 10–29	2–5	M&T Bank Stadium	Recap
9	November 2	Atlanta Falcons	L 0–24	2–6	Oakland–Alameda County Coliseum	Recap
10	November 9	Carolina Panthers	L 6–17	2–7	Oakland–Alameda County Coliseum	Recap
11	November 16	at Miami Dolphins	L 15–17	2–8	Dolphin Stadium	Recap
12	November 23	at Denver Broncos	W 31–10	3–8	Invesco Field at Mile High	Recap
13	November 30	Kansas City Chiefs	L 13–20	3–9	Oakland–Alameda County Coliseum	Recap
14	December 4	at San Diego Chargers	L 7–34	3–10	Qualcomm Stadium	Recap
15	December 14	New England Patriots	L 26–49	3–11	Oakland–Alameda County Coliseum	Recap
16	December 21	Houston Texans	W 27–16	4–11	Oakland–Alameda County Coliseum	Recap
17	December 28	at Tampa Bay Buccaneers	W 31–24	5–11	Raymond James Stadium	Recap

=== Standings ===
AFC West
	W	L	T	PCT	DIV	CONF	PF	PA	STK
^{(4)} San Diego Chargers	8	8	0	.500	5–1	7–5	439	347	W4
Denver Broncos	8	8	0	.500	3–3	5–7	370	448	L3
Oakland Raiders	5	11	0	.313	2–4	4–8	263	388	W2
Kansas City Chiefs	2	14	0	.125	2–4	2–10	291	440	L4

=== Conference standings ===
AFC
#	Team	Division	W	L	T	PCT	DIV	CONF	SOS	SOV	STK
Division leaders
1	Tennessee Titans	South	13	3	0	.813	4–2	9–3	.459	.425	L1
2	Pittsburgh Steelers	North	12	4	0	.750	6–0	10–2	.525	.458	W1
3 (Note: Miami finished ahead of New England in the AFC East based on better conference record.)	Miami Dolphins	East	11	5	0	.688	4–2	8–4	.461	.398	W5
4 (Note: San Diego finished ahead of Denver in the AFC West based on better division record.)	San Diego Chargers	West	8	8	0	.500	5–1	7–5	.516	.398	W4
Wild Cards
5	Indianapolis Colts	South	12	4	0	.750	4–2	10–2	.498	.492	W9
6 (Note: Baltimore clinched the AFC #6 seed over New England based on better conference record.)	Baltimore Ravens	North	11	5	0	.688	4–2	8–4	.521	.412	W2
Did not qualify for the postseason
7	New England Patriots	East	11	5	0	.688	4–2	7–5	.480	.403	W4
8	New York Jets	East	9	7	0	.563	4–2	7–5	.471	.462	L2
9 (Note: Houston finished ahead of Denver based on better winning percentage vs. common opponents (3–2 against 2–3 vs. Miami, Oakland, Jacksonville and Cleveland).)	Houston Texans	South	8	8	0	.500	2–4	5–7	.518	.410	W1
10	Denver Broncos	West	8	8	0	.500	3–3	5–7	.457	.438	L3
11	Buffalo Bills	East	7	9	0	.438	0–6	5–7	.453	.304	L1
12 (Note: Oakland finished ahead of Jacksonville based on better conference record.)	Oakland Raiders	West	5	11	0	.313	2–4	4–8	.520	.450	W2
13	Jacksonville Jaguars	South	5	11	0	.313	2–4	3–9	.537	.425	L2
14	Cincinnati Bengals	North	4	11	1	.281	1–5	3–9	.553	.297	W3
15	Cleveland Browns	North	4	12	0	.250	1–5	3–9	.572	.445	L6
16	Kansas City Chiefs	West	2	14	0	.125	2–4	2–10	.537	.406	L4
Tiebreakers (Note: When breaking ties for three or more teams under the NFL's rules, they are first broken within divisions, then comparing only the highest ranked remaining team from each division.)

== Regular season results ==
=== Week 1: vs. Denver Broncos ===
Quarter	1	2	3	4	Total
Broncos	7	10	10	14	41
Raiders	0	0	0	14	14

at McAfee Coliseum, Oakland, California

- Game time: 10:15 pm EDT/7:15 pm PDT
- Game weather: 60 °F or 15.6 °C (Partly Cloudy)
- Game attendance: 62,762
- Referee: Bill Leavy
- TV announcers (ESPN): Mike Greenberg, Mike Golic, Mike Ditka, & Suzy Kolber

The Raiders began their 2008 campaign at home against their AFC West rival, the Denver Broncos, in the second game of Monday Night Football's doubleheader. In the first quarter, Oakland trailed early as Broncos QB Jay Cutler completed a 26-yard TD pass to WR Eddie Royal. In the second quarter, the Raiders continued to trail as kicker Matt Prater got a 26-yard field goal, while FB Michael Pittman got a 3-yard TD run. In the third quarter, Oakland got even more black and blue as Cutler completed a 48-yard TD pass to WR Darrell Jackson, while Prater nailed a 43-yard field goal. In the fourth quarter, the Raiders finally got on the board as QB JaMarcus Russell completed an 8-yard TD pass to WR Ashley Lelie. Denver ended its rout with RB Selvin Young's 5-yard TD run and Pittman's 1-yard TD run. Oakland would close the game with Russell's 4-yard TD pass to WR Ronald Curry.

With the dismal loss, the Raiders began their season at 0–1 for the sixth straight year.

=== Week 2: at Kansas City Chiefs ===
Quarter	1	2	3	4	Total
Raiders	6	0	7	10	23
Chiefs	0	0	0	8	8

at Arrowhead Stadium, Kansas City, Missouri

- Game time: 1:00 pm EDT/10:00 am PDT
- Game weather: 61 °F or 16.1 °C (Cloudy)
- Game attendance: 74,480
- Referee: Walt Anderson
- TV announcers (CBS): Kevin Harlan & Rich Gannon

Hoping to rebound from their horrendous home loss to the Broncos, the Raiders flew to Arrowhead Stadium for a Week 2 AFC West showdown with the Kansas City Chiefs. In the first quarter, Oakland came out punching as kicker Sebastian Janikowski nailed a 56-yard and a 25-yard field goal. After a scoreless second quarter, rookie RB Darren McFadden picked up his first-ever career touchdown in the third quarter on a 19-yard TD run. In the fourth quarter, the Raiders increased its lead with Janikowski getting a 40-yard field goal. The Chiefs would respond with their only score of the game as QB Tyler Thigpen completed a 2-yard TD pass to TE Tony Gonzalez (along with a two-point conversion pass to fullback Mike Cox). Oakland would close out the game with rookie RB Michael Bush getting a 32-yard TD run.

With the win, the Raiders improved to 1–1.

Darren McFadden (21 carries for 164 yards and a touchdown) would become the first rookie Raider to run for 100 yards since Bo Jackson in 1987. Also, the Raiders' combined rushing attack would reach 300 yards for the first time since November 1987.

The defense's improvement from Week 1 showed, as they limited Kansas City to 8 points, which is the fewest that Oakland had allowed since December 28, 2002 (0 points allowed, also against Kansas City).

=== Week 3: at Buffalo Bills ===
Quarter	1	2	3	4	Total
Raiders	6	3	7	7	23
Bills	0	7	0	17	24

at Ralph Wilson Stadium, Orchard Park, New York

- Game time: 1:00 pm EDT
- Game weather: 66 °F or 18.9 °C (Partly Cloudy)
- Game attendance: 71,297
- Referee: Carl Cheffers
- TV announcers (CBS): Don Criqui & Dan Fouts

Hoping to build off their divisional road win over the Chiefs, the Raiders flew to Ralph Wilson Stadium for a Week 3 duel with the Buffalo Bills. In the first quarter, Oakland got the early lead with kicker Sebastian Janikowski getting a 23-yard and a 35-yard field goal. In the second quarter, the Bills responded with RB Marshawn Lynch getting a 14-yard TD run. The Raiders would end the half with Janikowski kicking a 32-yard field goal.

In the third quarter, the Raiders increased its lead with QB JaMarcus Russell getting a 1-yard TD run. However, in the fourth quarter, Buffalo started to rally as Lynch got a 3-yard TD run. Oakland would respond as Russell completed an 84-yard TD pass to WR Johnnie Lee Higgins, yet the Bills got near as QB Trent Edwards completed a 14-yard TD pass to WR Roscoe Parrish. Later, Buffalo completed its rally as kicker Rian Lindell nailed the game-winning 38-yard field goal.

With the heart-breaking loss, the Raiders fell to 1–2.

After the game, Chris Mortensen of ESPN and Jay Glazer of Fox Sports both erroneously reported that Lane Kiffin would be fired the following Monday; this turned out not to be the case, as Kiffin was coaching the team during Week 4.

=== Week 4: vs. San Diego Chargers ===
Quarter	1	2	3	4	Total
Chargers	0	0	3	25	28
Raiders	5	10	0	3	18

at Oakland–Alameda County Coliseum, Oakland, California

- Game time: 4:05 pm EDT
- Game weather: 78 °F or 25.6 °C (Sunny)
- Game attendance: 61,808
- Referee: Alberto Riveron
- TV announcers (CBS): Jim Nantz & Phil Simms

Hoping to rebound from their road loss to the Bills, the Raiders went home for a Week 4 AFC West duel with the San Diego Chargers. In the first quarter, Oakland struck first as kicker Sebastian Janikowski got a 22-yard goal, with Safety Gibril Wilson sacking Chargers QB Philip Rivers in his endzone for a safety. In the second quarter, the Raiders increased their lead with QB JaMarcus Russell completing a 63-yard TD pass to TE Zach Miller, along with Janikowski kicking a 28-yard field goal.

Just prior to halftime, Janikowski attempted to kick a 76-yard field goal, a full 13 yards longer than the NFL record and seven yards longer than the record at any level of gridiron football. Predictably, the kick fell well short, not even reaching the end zone (much less the goal posts), and the ball was picked up by Chargers cornerback Antonio Cromartie.

In the third quarter, the Chargers got on the board with kicker Nate Kaeding's 28-yard field goal. In the fourth quarter, San Diego took the lead with Rivers' 9-yard TD pass to TE Antonio Gates and RB LaDainian Tomlinson's 13-yard TD run (along with a successful 2-point conversion pass from Rivers to RB Darren Sproles). Oakland tried to prevent another collapse as Janikowski got a 32-yard field goal. However, the Chargers sealed the win with Kaeding nailing a 47-yard field goal and Tomlinson getting a 41-yard TD run.

With the loss, the Raiders went into their bye week at 1–3.

The following Tuesday, Lane Kiffin was officially fired as head coach and was replaced by offensive line coach Tom Cable.

=== Week 6: at New Orleans Saints ===
Quarter	1	2	3	4	Total
Raiders	3	0	0	0	3
Saints	0	10	14	10	34

at Louisiana Superdome, New Orleans, Louisiana

- Game time: 1:00 pm EDT/10:00 am PDT
- Game weather: None (Domed Stadium)
- Game attendance: 70,068
- Referee: Terry McAulay
- TV announcers (CBS): Kevin Harlan & Rich Gannon

Coming off their bye week, the Raiders flew to the Louisiana Superdome for a Week 6 interconference duel with the New Orleans Saints. In the first quarter, Oakland struck first as kicker Sebastian Janikowski got a 24-yard field goal. In the second quarter, the Saints took the lead as RB Reggie Bush got a 3-yard TD run, along with kicker Taylor Mehlhaff getting a 44-yard field goal. In the third quarter, the Saints increased their lead as QB Drew Brees completed an 8-yard TD pass to RB Aaron Stecker and a 15-yard TD pass to Bush. In the fourth quarter, New Orleans closed the game out with Mehlhaff nailing a 33-yard field goal, along with Brees completing a 2-yard TD pass to TE Mark Campbell.

With the loss, the Raiders fell to 1–4.

=== Week 7: vs. New York Jets ===
Quarter	1	2	3	4	OT	Total
Jets	3	0	0	10	0	13
Raiders	3	0	7	3	3	16

at Oakland–Alameda County Coliseum, Oakland, California

- Game time: 4:15 pm EDT
- Game weather: 59 °F or 15 °C (Partly Cloudy)
- Game attendance: 61,901
- Referee: Jerome Boger
- TV announcers (CBS): Dick Enberg, Randy Cross, & Dan Fouts

Hoping to rebound from their road loss to the Saints, the Raiders went home for a Week 7 duel with the New York Jets. In the first quarter, Oakland trailed early as Jets kicker Jay Feely got a 40-yard field goal. The Raiders responded with kicker Sebastian Janikowski getting a 29-yard field goal. After a scoreless second quarter, Oakland took the lead as QB JaMarcus Russell completed an 8-yard TD pass to WR Javon Walker. In the fourth quarter, New York tied the game as RB Leon Washington got an 11-yard TD run. The Raiders answered with Janikowski making a 37-yard field goal. The Jets would send the game into overtime as Feely got a 52-yard field goal. In overtime, the Silver and Black prevailed as Janikowski nailed the game-winning 57-yard field goal (a franchise record).

With the win, the Raiders improved to 2–4.

=== Week 8: at Baltimore Ravens ===
Quarter	1	2	3	4	Total
Raiders	0	0	10	0	10
Ravens	2	17	3	7	29

at M&T Bank Stadium, Baltimore, Maryland

- Game time: 1:00 pm EDT/10:00 am PDT
- Game weather: 65 °F or 18.3 °C (Sunny)
- Game attendance: 71,254
- Referee: Jeff Triplette
- TV announcers (CBS): Ian Eagle & Solomon Wilcots

Coming off their overtime win over the Jets, the Raiders flew to M&T Bank Stadium for a Week 8 duel with the Baltimore Ravens. In the first quarter, Oakland trailed early as QB JaMarcus Russell was sacked by LB Jameel McClain in his own endzone for a safety. In the second quarter, the Raiders continued to struggle as Ravens RB Willis McGahee got a 1-yard TD run, while QB Joe Flacco completed a 70-yard TD pass to WR Demetrius Williams. The Ravens closed out the half with kicker Matt Stover getting a 38-yard field goal.

In the third quarter, Oakland got on the board as kicker Sebastian Janikowski got a 22-yard field goal. Baltimore would respond with Stover nailing a 30-yard field goal, yet the Raiders answered with Russell completing a 2-yard TD pass to FB Justin Griffith. In the fourth quarter, the Ravens pulled away as Flacco got a 12-yard TD run.

With the loss, Oakland fell to 2–5.

=== Week 9: vs. Atlanta Falcons ===
Quarter	1	2	3	4	Total
Falcons	14	10	0	0	24
Raiders	0	0	0	0	0

at Oakland–Alameda County Coliseum, Oakland, California

- Game time: 4:15 pm EDT
- Game weather: 63 °F or 17.2 °C (Sunny)
- Game attendance: 61,196
- Referee: Walt Anderson
- TV announcers (Fox): Matt Vasgersian, J.C. Pearson, & Nischelle Turner

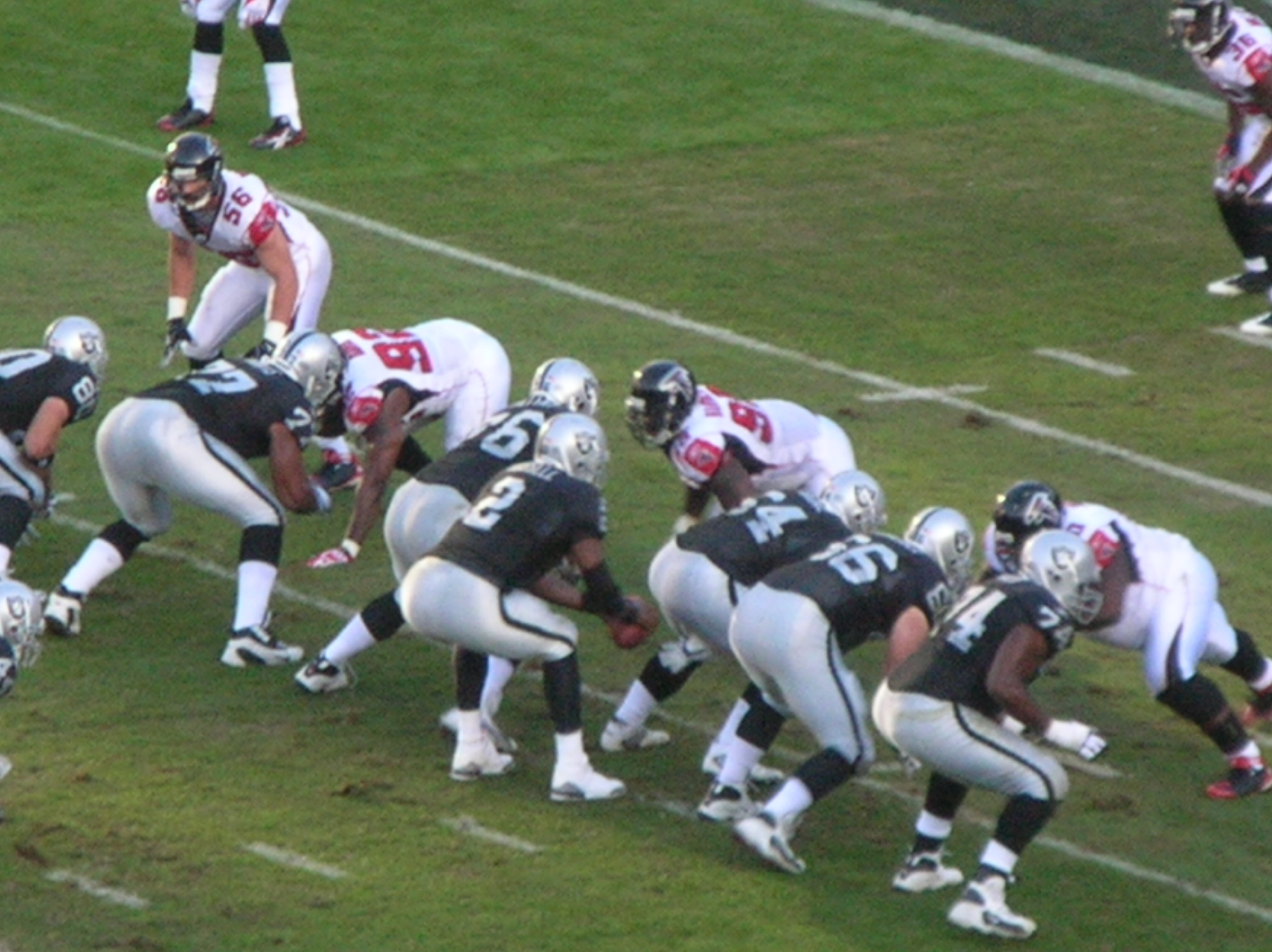
Russell would throw an interception on this play in the end zone against Atlanta

Hoping to rebound from their road loss to the Ravens, the Raiders went home for a Week 9 interconference duel with the Atlanta Falcons. In the first quarter, Oakland trailed early as Falcons QB Matt Ryan completed a 37-yard TD pass to WR Michael Jenkins, while RB Jerious Norwood got a 12-yard TD run. In the second quarter, the Raiders' struggles continued as Ryan hooked up with Jenkins again on a 27-yard TD pass, while kicker Jason Elam nailed a 48-yard field goal. From then on out, Atlanta would prevent Oakland from getting any kind of positive drive going and the Raiders fell to 2–6 with the shutout loss.

In the loss, Oakland was held to 77 total yards of offense (fewest since 1961), three first downs (tied for the NFL’s third fewest since 1970), and 14:45 time of possession (second lowest since 1991).

=== Week 10: vs. Carolina Panthers ===
Quarter	1	2	3	4	Total
Panthers	7	7	0	3	17
Raiders	0	0	6	0	6

at Oakland–Alameda County Coliseum, Oakland, California

- Game time: 4:05 pm EDT
- Game weather: 62 °F or 16.7 °C (Sunny)
- Game attendance: 47,888
- Referee: Mike Carey
- TV announcers (Fox): Dick Stockton, Brian Baldinger, Brian Billick, & Laura Okmin (blacked out locally)

Hoping to rebound from their shutout loss to the Falcons, the Raiders stayed at home for a Week 10 interconference duel with the Carolina Panthers. With QB JaMarcus Russell recovering from an injury, back-up QB Andrew Walter was given the start.

In the first quarter, Oakland trailed early as Panthers QB Jake Delhomme completed a 3-yard TD pass to WR Muhsin Muhammad. In the second quarter, the Raiders continued to trail as RB DeAngelo Williams got a 69-yard TD run. In the third quarter, Oakland got on the board with kicker Sebastian Janikowski getting a 38-yard and a 45-yard field goal. In the fourth quarter, Carolina sealed the win with kicker John Kasay nailing a 32-yard field goal.

With the loss, the Raiders fell to 2–7. This was also the Raiders’ 300th franchise loss.

On a positive note, Janikowski's two field goals helped him surpass George Blanda and become the franchise's all-time career points leader with 865 points.

=== Week 11: at Miami Dolphins ===
Quarter	1	2	3	4	Total
Raiders	0	3	2	10	15
Dolphins	7	0	7	3	17

at Dolphin Stadium, Miami Gardens, Florida

- Game time: 1:00 pm EDT/10:00 am PST
- Game weather: 67 °F or 19.4 °C (Sunny)
- Game attendance: 65,113
- Referee: Ed Hochuli
- TV announcers (CBS): Ian Eagle & Solomon Wilcots

Hoping to rebound from their three-game losing streak, the Raiders flew to Dolphin Stadium for a Week 11 duel with the Miami Dolphins. In the first quarter, Oakland trailed early as Dolphins WR Ted Ginn Jr. got a 40-yard TD run. In the second quarter, the Raiders responded with kicker Sebastian Janikowski getting a 21-yard field goal. In the third quarter, Oakland started to catch up as DE Jay Richardson sacked QB Chad Pennington in his own endzone for a safety. Miami would answer with RB Patrick Cobbs getting a 10-yard TD run. In the fourth quarter, the Raiders took the lead as Janikowski got a 37-yard field goal, along with WR Johnnie Lee Higgins returning a punt 93 yards for a touchdown. However, the Dolphins sealed Oakland's fate as kicker Dan Carpenter nailed a 38-yard field goal.

With the loss, the Raiders fell to 2–8.

=== Week 12: at Denver Broncos ===
Quarter	1	2	3	4	Total
Raiders	0	10	7	14	31
Broncos	0	3	7	0	10

at Invesco Field at Mile High, Denver, Colorado

- Game time: 4:05 pm EDT/1:05 pm PST
- Game weather: 47 °F or 8.3 °C (Partly Cloudy)
- Game attendance: 76,067
- Referee: Jeff Triplette
- TV announcers (CBS): Dick Enberg & Randy Cross

Trying to snap a four-game losing streak, the Raiders flew to Invesco Field at Mile High for a Week 12 AFC West rematch with the Denver Broncos. After a scoreless first quarter, Oakland drew first blood with kicker Sebastian Janikowski getting a 26-yard field goal. The Broncos would respond with kicker Matt Prater getting a 44-yard field goal. The Raiders would close out the half as WR Johnnie Lee Higgins returned a punt 89 yards for a touchdown.

In the third quarter, Denver tied the game with FB Peyton Hillis getting a 6-yard TD run. Oakland would reply with rookie RB Darren McFadden getting a 1-yard TD run. In the fourth quarter, the Raiders pulled away as QB JaMarcus Russell completed a 4-yard TD pass to former Broncos WR Ashley Lelie, while McFadden got another 1-yard TD run.

With the upset win, Oakland improved to 3–8.

=== Week 13: vs. Kansas City Chiefs ===
Quarter	1	2	3	4	Total
Chiefs	3	7	0	10	20
Raiders	3	0	7	3	13

at Oakland–Alameda County Coliseum, Oakland, California

- Game time: 4:15 pm EDT/1:15 pm PDT
- Game weather: 59 °F or 15 °C (Partly Cloudy)
- Game attendance: 61,379
- Referee: Peter Morelli
- TV announcers (CBS): Bill Macatee & Steve Beuerlein

Coming off their upset road win over the Broncos, the Raiders went home for a Week 13 AFC West rematch with the Kansas City Chiefs. In the first quarter, Oakland struck first as kicker Sebastian Janikowski got a 25-yard field goal. The Chiefs would respond with kicker Connor Barth getting a 38-yard field goal. In the second quarter, Kansas City took the lead as CB Maurice Leggett returned a fumble from a trick play on a field goal attempt 67 yards for a touchdown. In the third quarter, Oakland responded with RB Justin Fargas getting a 1-yard TD run. In the fourth quarter, the Chiefs replied with RB Larry Johnson getting a 2-yard TD run, along with Barth making a 27-yard field goal. The Raiders tried to come back as Janikowski nailed a 51-yard field goal, but Kansas City's defense was too much to overcome.

With the loss, Oakland fell to 3–9.

=== Week 14: vs. San Diego Chargers ===
Quarter	1	2	3	4	Total
Raiders	0	7	0	0	7
Chargers	10	17	0	7	34

at Qualcomm Stadium, San Diego, California

- Game time: 8:15 pm EDT/5:15 pm PDT
- Game weather: 62 °F or 16.7 °C (Clear)
- Game attendance: 68,097
- Referee: Tony Corrente
- TV announcers (NFLN): Bob Papa & Cris Collinsworth

Hoping to rebound from their home loss to the Chiefs, the Raiders flew to Qualcomm Stadium for a Week 14 AFC West rematch with the San Diego Chargers. In the first quarter, Oakland trailed early as Chargers kicker Nate Kaeding getting a 20-yard field goal, along with RB LaDainian Tomlinson getting a 3-yard TD run. The Raiders continued to trail as QB Philip Rivers completed an 8-yard TD pass to RB Darren Sproles and a 59-yard TD pass to WR Vincent Jackson, while Kaeding got a 39-yard field goal. Oakland responded with CB Justin Miller returning a kickoff 98 yards for a touchdown. After a scoreless third quarter, San Diego pulled away in the fourth quarter as Rivers hooked up with Sproles again on an 18-yard TD pass.

With the loss, not only did the Raiders fall to 3–10, but they also suffered their sixth-straight 10-loss season.

=== Week 15: vs. New England Patriots ===
Quarter	1	2	3	4	Total
Patriots	21	14	7	7	49
Raiders	7	7	6	6	26

at Oakland–Alameda County Coliseum, Oakland, California

- Game time: 4:15 pm. EST/1:15 pm. PST
- Game weather: 44 °F or 6.7 °C (Rain)
- Game attendance: 62,179
- Referee: John Parry
- TV announcers (CBS): Kevin Harlan (play-by-play) and Rich Gannon (color commentator)

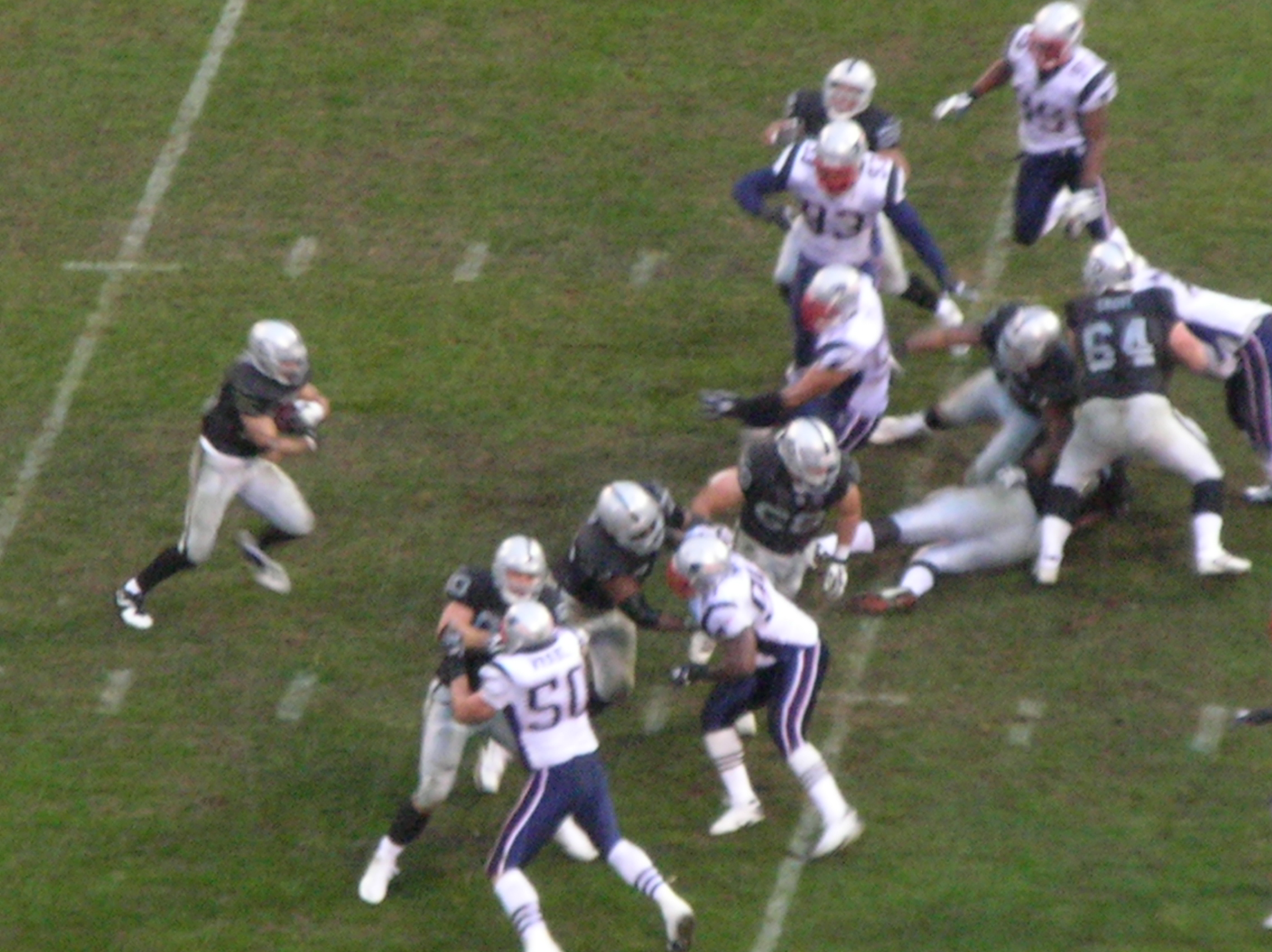
The Raiders run the ball against the Patriots in the rain

=== Week 16: vs. Houston Texans ===
Quarter	1	2	3	4	Total
Texans	7	6	0	3	16
Raiders	13	0	14	0	27

at Oakland–Alameda County Coliseum, Oakland, California

- Game time: 4:00 pm. EST/1:00 pm. PST
- Game weather: 48 °F or 8.9 °C (Cloudy)
- Game attendance: 43,687
- Referee: Bill Carollo
- TV announcers (CBS): Bill Macatee & Steve Beuerlein

Hoping to rebound from their loss to the Patriots, the Raiders stayed at home for a Week 16 duel with the Houston Texans. Oakland would get the early lead in the first quarter as quarterback JaMarcus Russell completed a 20-yard touchdown pass to rookie wide receiver Chaz Schilens. The Texans would respond with fullback Vonta Leach getting a 1-yard touchdown run, yet the Raiders would answer with kicker Sebastian Janikowski getting a 33-yard and a 30-yard field goal. Houston would tie the game in the second quarter with kicker Kris Brown getting a 53-yard and a 24-yard field goal.

Oakland would take the lead in the third quarter with wide receiver Johnnie Lee Higgins catching a 29-yard touchdown pass from Russell, followed up by an 80-yard punt return for a touchdown. The Texans tried to rally in the fourth quarter as Brown nailed a 40-yard field goal, yet the Raiders' defense would shut down any possible attempt.

With the win, Oakland improved to 4–11.

=== Week 17: at Tampa Bay Buccaneers ===
Quarter	1	2	3	4	Total
Raiders	0	14	0	17	31
Buccaneers	0	7	7	10	24

at Raymond James Stadium, Tampa, Florida

- Game time: 1:00 p.m. EST
- Game weather: 77 °F or 25 °C (Sunny)
- Game attendance: 64,847
- Referee: Ron Winter
- TV announcers (CBS): Kevin Harlan & Rich Gannon

After a scoreless first quarter Oakland scored on a 3-yd TD run by second year running back Michael Bush who finished the game with 27 rushes for 177 yards. After a touchdown by both teams the Bucs scored 17 unanswered points to take a 24–14 lead in the fourth quarter but a 12-yd touchdown pass from quarterback JaMarcus Russell to wide receiver Johnnie Lee Higgins and a 67-yard run by running back Michael Bush gave the Raiders a 28–24 lead. on the Bucs’ next drive Jeff Garcia threw an interception to safety Rashad Baker. After a goal line stand by the Bucs defense the Raiders scored a 25-yd field goal via kicker Sebastian Janikowski to gain a 7-point lead. On the next drive the first career sack by rookie defensive end Greyson Gunheims ended the game. The Raiders this ended their season on a 2-game winning streak and finish their season with a 5–11 record; the best since they also went 5–11 in 2004. The Raiders also knocked the Buccaneers out of Playoff contention. Interim head coach Tom Cable was named permanent head coach February 4, 2009.

Following the conclusion of the 2008 season the Oakland Raiders were identified as the “Coach Killers” of the NFL. Following losses to the Raiders during the season, Jon Gruden of the Tampa Bay Buccaneers, Herm Edwards of the Kansas City Chiefs, Eric Mangini of the New York Jets and Mike Shanahan of the Denver Broncos were all let go from their respective franchises. Gary Kubiak of the Texans was the only head coach to lose to the Oakland Raiders in the 2008 season and keep his job.

== Notes ==
Preceded by 2007 Oakland Raiders season	2008 Oakland Raiders season	Succeeded by 2009 Oakland Raiders season
