= 2008 Denver Broncos season =

American football team season

- Owner: Pat Bowlen
- General manager: Mike Shanahan
- President: Pat Bowlen
- Head coach: Mike Shanahan
- Offensive coordinator: Rick Dennison
- Defensive coordinator: Bob Slowik
- Home stadium: Invesco Field at Mile High

Results
- Record: 8–8
- Division place: 2nd AFC West
- Playoffs: Did not qualify
- Pro Bowlers: 3

The 2008 season was the Denver Broncos' 39th in the National Football League (NFL), their 49th overall and their 25th under the ownership of Pat Bowlen. The Broncos improved from their 7–9 record from 2007 but failed to make the playoffs with an 8–8 record.

Entering Week 15, the Broncos had an 8–5 record, three games ahead of the San Diego Chargers for the AFC West division title. The Chargers ended the season on a four-game winning streak, while the Broncos ended the season on a three-game losing streak, losing 52–21 to the San Diego Chargers in the regular season finale. The Broncos and Chargers both finished 8–8, however, the Broncos lost the tiebreaker due to the Chargers' owning a better division record (5–1 to 3–3). On December 30, 2008, two days after the regular season ended, Mike Shanahan was fired as the Broncos' head coach after 14 seasons.

== NFL draft ==
2008 Denver Broncos draft
Round	Pick	Player	Position	College	Notes
1	12	Ryan Clady *	Offensive tackle	Boise State	
2	42	Eddie Royal	Wide receiver	Virginia Tech	
4	108	Kory Lichtensteiger	Center	Bowling Green	
4	119	Jack Williams	Cornerback	Kent State	from Washington (Note: #119: Washington → Denver (PD). The Washington Redskins traded their fourth-round selection in 2008, and their third-round selection in 2007 (used to select Ryan Harris) to Denver as part of a three-team trade in which Washington received T. J. Duckett and Atlanta received Ashley Lelie. (This was the result of a formula which could have had Denver and Washington swapping 2007 first-round selections.))
5	139	Ryan Torain	Running back	Arizona State	from Oakland (Note: #139: Oakland → Denver (PD). Oakland (conditionally) traded their fifth-round selection to Denver in exchange for Gerard Warren.)
5	148	Carlton Powell	Defensive tackle	Virginia Tech	
6	183	Spencer Larsen	Linebacker	Arizona	from Houston (Note: #183: Houston → Denver (PD). Houston traded their sixth-round selection to Denver for Chris Myers. (Note: "The Sports Network – National Football League". Sportsnetwork.com.))
7	220	Josh Barrett	Safety	Arizona State	
7	227	Peyton Hillis	Fullback	Arkansas	from Tampa Bay (Note: #227: Tampa Bay → Denver (PD). Tampa Bay traded a conditional 2008 draft pick to Denver for the rights to quarterback Jake Plummer. If Plummer, who is currently retired, had reported to the Buccaneers before the first pick of the 2008 draft was made, Tampa Bay would have sent the Broncos their fourth-round selection. Since Plummer did not report, Denver will receive Tampa's seventh-round selection.)
Made roster * Made at least one Pro Bowl during career

== Personnel ==
=== Staff / Coaches ===
2008 Denver Broncos staff
Front office: Majority Owner / President and chief executive officer – Pat Bowlen; Head coaches: Executive vice president of football operations/head coach – Mike Shanahan; Associate head coach – Steve Watson; Offensive coaches: Offensive coordinator/offensive line – Rick Dennison; Quarterbacks – Jeremy Bates; Running backs – Bobby Turner; Wide receivers – Jedd Fisch; Tight ends – Pat McPherson; Offensive assistant – Joe Baker	Defensive coaches: Defensive coordinator – Bob Slowik; Defensive line – Jacob Burney; Defensive line – Bill Johnson; Linebackers – Jim Ryan; Defensive backs – Ronnie Bradford; Assistant defensive backs – Ryan Slowik; Defensive assistant – Charlie Jackson; Special teams coaches: Special teams coordinator – Scott O'Brien; Special teams assistant – Keith Burns; Strength and conditioning: Strength and conditioning – Rich Tuten; Assistant strength and conditioning – Dwayne Chandler; Assistant strength and conditioning – Greg Saporta

=== Roster ===
2008 Denver Broncos roster
Quarterbacks (QB): 6 Jay Cutler; 4 Darrell Hackney; Running backs (RB): 21 Tatum Bell; 30 Cory Boyd; 37 Alex Haynes; 38 Andrew Pinnock FB; Wide receivers (WR): 16 Chad Jackson KR; 82 Darrell Jackson; 15 Brandon Marshall; 19 Eddie Royal; 14 Brandon Stokley; Tight ends (TE): 89 Daniel Graham; 85 Chad Mustard; 87 Jeb Putzier; 88 Tony Scheffler	Offensive linemen (OL): 78 Ryan Clady T; 50 Ben Hamilton G; 74 Ryan Harris T; 73 Chris Kuper G; 67 Kory Lichtensteiger G; 72 Pat Murray G; 76 Tyler Polumbus T; 62 Casey Wiegmann C; Defensive linemen (DL): 93 Nic Clemons DE/DT; 96 Tim Crowder DE; 92 Elvis Dumervil DE; 91 Ebenezer Ekuban DE; 60 John Engelberger DE; 94 Jarvis Moss DE; 90 Kenny Peterson DE/DT; 63 Dewayne Robertson DT; 79 Marcus Thomas DT	Linebackers (LB): 53 Louis Green OLB; 57 Mario Haggan OLB; 53 Niko Koutouvides MLB; 46 Spencer Larsen; 58 Nate Webster MLB; 55 D. J. Williams OLB; 51 Jamie Winborn OLB; 59 Wesley Woodyard OLB; Defensive backs (DB): 24 Champ Bailey CB; 36 Josh Barrett SS; 34 Josh Bell CB; 32 Dré Bly CB; 39 Vernon Fox FS; 43 Herana-Daze Jones SS; 33 Marquand Manuel SS; 20 Marlon McCree FS; 41 Karl Paymah CB; 26 Jack Williams CB; Special teams (ST): 1 Brett Kern P; 83 Mike Leach; 5 Matt Prater K	Practice squad: 99 Matthias Askew DT; -- Steve Baylark RB; 61 Mitch Erickson G; -- Greg Eslinger C; 17 Jayson Foster WR; 98 Ryan McBean DE; 40 Rashod Moulton CB; 56 Manuel Padilla LB; 12 Matt Willis WR; Reserve: -- Anthony Alridge RB (IR); 97 Boss Bailey LB (IR); 23 Andre Hall (IR); 22 Peyton Hillis RB (IR); 81 Nate Jackson TE (IR); 66 Tom Nalen C (IR); 64 Erik Pears T; 28 Michael Pittman Sr. RB (IR); 31 P. J. Pope RB (IR); 71 Carlton Powell DT; 11 Patrick Ramsey QB (IR); 10 Cliff Russell (IR); 95 Josh Shaw; 86 Edell Shepherd WR (IR); 42 Ryan Torain RB (IR); 35 Selvin Young RB (IR); Rookies in italics 53 active, 16 reserve, 9 practice squad

== Roster changes ==
On February 29, 2008, linebacker Ian Gold and wide receiver Javon Walker were released by the Broncos in preparation for the NFL Draft and free agency. Walker was signed by the Oakland Raiders. Long-time Broncos kicker Jason Elam was not re-signed by the Broncos, and was then signed by the Atlanta Falcons.

On June 2, 2008, running back Travis Henry was cut by the team. Seventh Round pick Josh Barrett signed on June 12, the first draft pick to sign with the team. Wide receiver Rod Smith, a veteran of both of the Broncos Super Bowl victories, retired on the first day of training camp.

== Schedule ==
=== Training camp ===
The Broncos opened training camp on July 24, 2008. On July 31, 2008, the Broncos granted safety John Lynch his release. The following day, head coach Mike Shanahan, asked about the upcoming season on talk radio, said "We’re not going to miss the playoffs." Later in the day, Shanahan backed off a bit, saying "I didn't make a guarantee . . . . you've got to be lucky and don't have the injuries we’ve had. If we don't have the injuries, I'd be very disappointed if we didn't make the playoffs."

=== Preseason ===
Week	Date	Opponent	Result	Record	Game site	NFL.com recap
1	August 9	at Houston Texans	**L** 16–19	0–1	Reliant Stadium	Recap
2	August 16	Dallas Cowboys	**W** 23–13	1–1	Invesco Field at Mile High	Recap
3	August 22	Green Bay Packers	**L** 24–27	1–2	Invesco Field at Mile High	Recap
4	August 29	at Arizona Cardinals	**W** 28–14	2–2	University of Phoenix Stadium	Recap

=== Regular season ===
Week	Date	Opponent	Result	Record	Game site	NFL.com recap
1	September 8	at **Oakland Raiders**	**W** 41–14	1–0	McAfee Coliseum	Recap
2	September 14	**San Diego Chargers**	**W** 39–38	2–0	Invesco Field at Mile High	Recap
3	September 21	New Orleans Saints	**W** 34–32	3–0	Invesco Field at Mile High	Recap
4	September 28	at **Kansas City Chiefs**	**L** 19–33	3–1	Arrowhead Stadium	Recap
5	October 5	Tampa Bay Buccaneers	**W** 16–13	4–1	Invesco Field at Mile High	Recap
6	October 12	Jacksonville Jaguars	**L** 17–24	4–2	Invesco Field at Mile High	Recap
7	October 20	at New England Patriots	**L** 7–41	4–3	Gillette Stadium	Recap
8	Bye					
9	November 2	Miami Dolphins	**L** 17–26	4–4	Invesco Field at Mile High	Recap
10	November 6	at Cleveland Browns	**W** 34–30	5–4	Cleveland Browns Stadium	Recap
11	November 16	at Atlanta Falcons	**W** 24–20	6–4	Georgia Dome	Recap
12	November 23	**Oakland Raiders**	**L** 10–31	6–5	Invesco Field at Mile High	Recap
13	November 30	at New York Jets	**W** 34–17	7–5	Giants Stadium	Recap
14	December 7	**Kansas City Chiefs**	**W** 24–17	8–5	Invesco Field at Mile High	Recap
15	December 14	at Carolina Panthers	**L** 10–30	8–6	Bank of America Stadium	Recap
16	December 21	Buffalo Bills	**L** 23–30	8–7	Invesco Field at Mile High	Recap
17	December 28	at **San Diego Chargers**	**L** 21–52	8–8	Qualcomm Stadium	Recap
Note: Intra-division opponents are in **bold** text.

=== Game summaries ===
==== Week 1: at Oakland Raiders ====
Quarter	1	2	3	4	Total
**Broncos**	7	10	10	14	**41**
Raiders	0	0	0	14	**14**

at McAfee Coliseum, Oakland, California

- Game time: 10:15 PM EST/7:15 PM PST
- Game weather: 60 °F (16 °C), partly cloudy
- Game attendance: 62,762
- Referee: Bill Leavy
- TV announcers (ESPN): Mike Greenberg, Mike Golic, Mike Ditka, & Suzy Kolber

The Broncos began their 2008 campaign on the road against their AFC West rival, the Oakland Raiders, in the second game of ESPN's Monday Night Football doubleheader. In the first quarter, Denver ran out of the gates early as quarterback Jay Cutler completed a 26-yard touchdown pass to rookie wide receiver Eddie Royal (who was filling in for wide receiver Brandon Marshall, due to his 1-game suspension). In the second quarter, the Broncos continued their domination as kicker Matt Prater got a 26-yard field goal, while fullback Michael Pittman got a 3-yard touchdown run. In the third quarter, Denver ran away with the game as Cutler completed a 48-yard touchdown pass to wide receiver Darrell Jackson, while Prater nailed a 43-yard field goal. In the fourth quarter, the Raiders spoiled the Broncos' bid for a shutout as quarterback JaMarcus Russell completed an 8-yard touchdown pass to wide receiver Ashley Lelie. Denver ended its domination with running back Selvin Young's 5-yard touchdown run and Pittman's 1-yard touchdown run. Oakland ended the scoring with Russell completing a 4-yard touchdown pass to wide receiver Ronald Curry.

With the dominating win, the Broncos began their season at 1–0; with the rest of the division suffering losses, Denver, in Week 1, was in sole possession of 1st place.

Eddie Royal, in his NFL debut, had the best Week 1 stats of any wide receiver, getting 9 receptions for 146 yards and a touchdown.

==== Week 2: vs San Diego Chargers ====
Quarter	1	2	3	4	Total
Chargers	3	14	10	11	**38**
**Broncos**	7	24	0	8	**39**

at Invesco Field at Mile High, Denver

- Game time: 4:15 PM EST/2:15 PM MST
- Game weather: 59 °F (15 °C), partly cloudy
- Game attendance: 75,915
- Referee: Ed Hochuli
- TV announcers (CBS): Dick Enberg & Randy Cross

Coming off their dominating divisional road win over the Raiders, the Broncos played their Week 2 home opener against the AFC West foe, the San Diego Chargers. In the first quarter, Denver was first out of the gate as fullback Michael Pittman got a 1-yard touchdown run. The Chargers responded with kicker Nate Kaeding getting a 34-yard field goal. In the second quarter, Denver replied with quarterback Jay Cutler completing a 3-yard and a 14-yard touchdown pass to tight end Tony Scheffler. San Diego immediately responded with running back Darren Sproles returning the kickoff 103 yards for a touchdown, yet the Broncos replied with rookie kicker Matt Prater getting a 52-yard field goal. The Chargers struck as their lead as quarterback Philip Rivers completed a 48-yard touchdown pass to wide receiver Chris Chambers, yet Denver retaliated with Cutler completing a 6-yard touchdown pass to wide receiver Brandon Marshall.

In the third quarter, San Diego started to rally as Rivers completed a 15-yard touchdown pass to Chambers, and Kaeding kicked a 21-yard field goal. In the fourth quarter, the Chargers took the lead with Kaeding's 28-yard field goal and Rivers' 66-yard touchdown pass to Sproles. The Broncos responded with a 12-play, 80-yard drive (which included a controversial officiating call that turned a Cutler fumble into an incomplete pass) that was capped off with Cutler's 4-yard touchdown pass to rookie wide receiver Eddie Royal, followed by Cutler's successful 2-point conversion pass to Royal.

With an exciting win, Denver improved to 2–0.

Brandon Marshall's 18 receptions was a single-game franchise record and tied for second most in league history.

==== Week 3: vs. New Orleans Saints ====
Quarter	1	2	3	4	Total
Saints	3	16	7	6	**32**
**Broncos**	14	10	10	0	**34**

at Invesco Field at Mile High, Denver

- Game time: 4:06 PM EDT
- Game weather: 76 °F (24 °C), partly cloudy
- Game attendance: 75,713
- Referee: Ron Winter
- TV announcers (Fox): Joe Buck, Troy Aikman, & Pam Oliver

Coming off their last-second win over the Chargers, the Broncos stayed at home, donned their alternate uniforms, and played a Week 3 interconference duel with the New Orleans Saints. In the first quarter, Denver drew first blood as quarterback Jay Cutler completed a 1-yard touchdown pass to tight end Nate Jackson. The Saints answered with kicker Martín Gramática getting a 43-yard field goal, yet Denver replied with Cutler completing a 35-yard touchdown pass to wide receiver Brandon Marshall. In the second quarter, the Broncos increased its lead as linebacker Nate Webster returned a fumble 34 yards for a touchdown. The Saints started to rally as running back Pierre Thomas got a 5-yard touchdown run, while tunning back Reggie Bush got a 23-yard touchdown run, yet Denver answered with kicker Matt Prater getting a 27-yard field goal. New Orleans closed out the half with defensive end Charles Grant tackling running back Andre Hall in his endzone for a safety.

In the third quarter, the Broncos replied with running back Michael Pittman getting a 2-yard touchdown run. The Saints answered with quarterback Drew Brees completing a 6-yard touchdown pass to Bush, yet Denver responded with Prater nailing a 34-yard field goal. In the fourth quarter, New Orleans tried to rally as Thomas got a 10-yard touchdown run (with a failed 2-point conversion). The Saints recovered a fumble, but Gramática's go-ahead 43-yard field goal went wide right, preserving the victory for Denver.

With the win, the Broncos improved to 3–0.

==== Week 4: at Kansas City Chiefs ====
Quarter	1	2	3	4	Total
Broncos	0	10	3	6	**19**
**Chiefs**	6	7	3	17	**33**

at Arrowhead Stadium, Kansas City, Missouri

- Game time: 1:00 PM EDT
- Game weather: 74 °F (23 °C), mostly sunny
- Game attendance: 74,623
- Referee: Mike Carey
- TV announcers (CBS): Greg Gumbel & Dan Dierdorf

The Kansas City Chiefs got off to a good start after they forced the Broncos to punt. This was followed with a 65-yard run by Larry Johnson to set up a 23-yard field goal kick by Nick Novak, putting the Chiefs on top 3–0. After recovering an Eddie Royal fumble early on Denver's next drive, Kansas City again failed to make it to the end zone and a 21-yard field goal by Novak put the Chiefs up 6–0.

The Broncos responded with an 8-play, 9-minute drive in the second quarter that ended in a touchdown pass from Jay Cutler to Brandon Marshall, putting the Broncos briefly in the lead, 7–6. Later in the quarter, a fumble by Marshall was returned to the Broncos' 2-yard line by the Chiefs, followed 2 plays later by a Johnson touchdown run, putting the Chiefs up 13–7. The Broncos got the ball back, but a 28-yard field goal by Matt Prater went wide right. After forcing the Chiefs to punt, the Broncos got the ball back and Prater hit a 56-yarder near the end of the half, drawing the Broncos within 13–10.

The second half began with a Denver drive that resulted in a 51-yard Prater field goal, tying the game at 13–13. The Chiefs answered with a 43-yard Novak field goal, putting them back on top 16–13. On the next drive, Cutler threw an interception. However, Kansas City's very next play was a Larry Johnson fumble recovered by Denver, although 2 plays later Cutler threw another interception. Despite this exchange of turnovers (3 turnovers in 4 plays), there was no scoring for the rest of the 3rd quarter.

Early in the fourth quarter, the Chiefs extended their lead to 23–13 with a 10-yard touchdown pass from Damon Huard to Tony Gonzalez. The Broncos, however, failed to capitalize on a sustained 16-play, 75-yard drive and settled with a Prater field goal, cutting the lead to 23–16. The Chiefs and Broncos then each got field goals on their next drives, bringing the score to 26–16. The Chiefs got a good return after the Prater field goal and put the game away with a 16-yard touchdown run from Johnson. With the 33–19 victory, the Chiefs snapped a league-leading 12-game losing streak dating back to week 7 of the 2007 season.

Larry Johnson carried the Chiefs with 198 rushing yards and 2 touchdowns. Huard managed the game well for the Chiefs, throwing 21/28 for 160 yards and 1 touchdown. Denver was hurt by 4 turnovers compared to just 1 for the Chiefs, but despite 2 interceptions, Cutler still was able to throw for 361 yards on 29/49 passing.

==== Week 5: vs. Tampa Bay Buccaneers ====
Quarter	1	2	3	4	Total
Buccaneers	3	3	0	7	**13**
**Broncos**	0	6	7	3	**16**

at Invesco Field at Mile High, Denver

- Game time: 4:05 p.m. EDT/2:05 PM MST
- Game weather: 70 °F (21 °C), partly cloudy
- Game attendance: 75,480
- Referee: Walt Anderson
- TV announcers (Fox): Chris Myers, Tim Ryan, & Tom Helmer

Hoping to rebound from their divisional road loss to the Chiefs, the Broncos went home for a Week 5 interconference duel with the Tampa Bay Buccaneers. In the first quarter, Denver trailed early as Buccaneers kicker Matt Bryant got a 33-yard field goal. In the second quarter, the Broncos took the lead as kicker Matt Prater got a 55-yard and a 40-yard field goal. Tampa Bay tied the game at halftime as Bryant kicked a 31-yard field goal. In the third quarter, Denver took a big lead as quarterback Jay Cutler completed a 10-yard touchdown pass to wide receiver Brandon Stokley. In the fourth quarter, the Broncos increased its lead as Prater nailed a 27-yard field goal. The Buccaneers rallied with a 7-yard touchdown pass from quarterback Jeff Garcia to wide receiver Ike Hilliard. However, Denver recovered the onside kick and drained the clock.

With the win, the Broncos improved to 4–1.

==== Week 6: vs. Jacksonville Jaguars ====
Quarter	1	2	3	4	Total
**Jaguars**	3	7	14	0	**24**
Broncos	7	0	3	7	**17**

at Invesco Field at Mile High, Denver

- Game time: 4:05 PM EST/2:05 PM MST
- Game weather: 43 °F (6 °C), cloudy
- Game attendance: 75,674
- Referee: Bill Carollo
- TV announcers (CBS): Greg Gumbel & Dan Dierdorf

Coming off their win over the Buccaneers, the Broncos stayed at home for a Week 6 duel with the Jacksonville Jaguars. In the first quarter, Denver struck first as quarterback Jay Cutler completed an 11-yard touchdown pass to wide receiver Brandon Stokley. The Jaguars responded as kicker Josh Scobee got a 48-yard field goal. In the second quarter, Jacksonville took the lead as running back Maurice Jones-Drew got a 1-yard touchdown run.

In the third quarter, Jacksonville increased their lead as Jones-Drew got a 46-yard touchdown run. The Broncos tried to catch up as kicker Matt Prater got a 39-yard field goal, yet the Jaguars answered with quarterback David Garrard completing a 30-yard touchdown pass to tight end Marcedes Lewis. In the fourth quarter, Denver tried to come back as Cutler completed an 11-yard touchdown pass to tight end Daniel Graham, but Jacksonville's defense stiffened, preventing any further scoring opportunities.

With the loss, the Broncos fell to 4–2.

==== Week 7: at New England Patriots ====
Quarter	1	2	3	4	Total
Broncos	0	0	0	7	**7**
**Patriots**	6	14	14	7	**41**

at Gillette Stadium, Foxborough, Massachusetts

- Game time: 8:30 PM EDT/6:30 PM MST
- Game weather: 40 °F (4 °C), clear
- Game attendance: 74,623
- Referee: Alberto Riveron
- TV announcers (ESPN): Mike Tirico, Ron Jaworski, Tony Kornheiser, Michele Tafoya, & Suzy Kolber

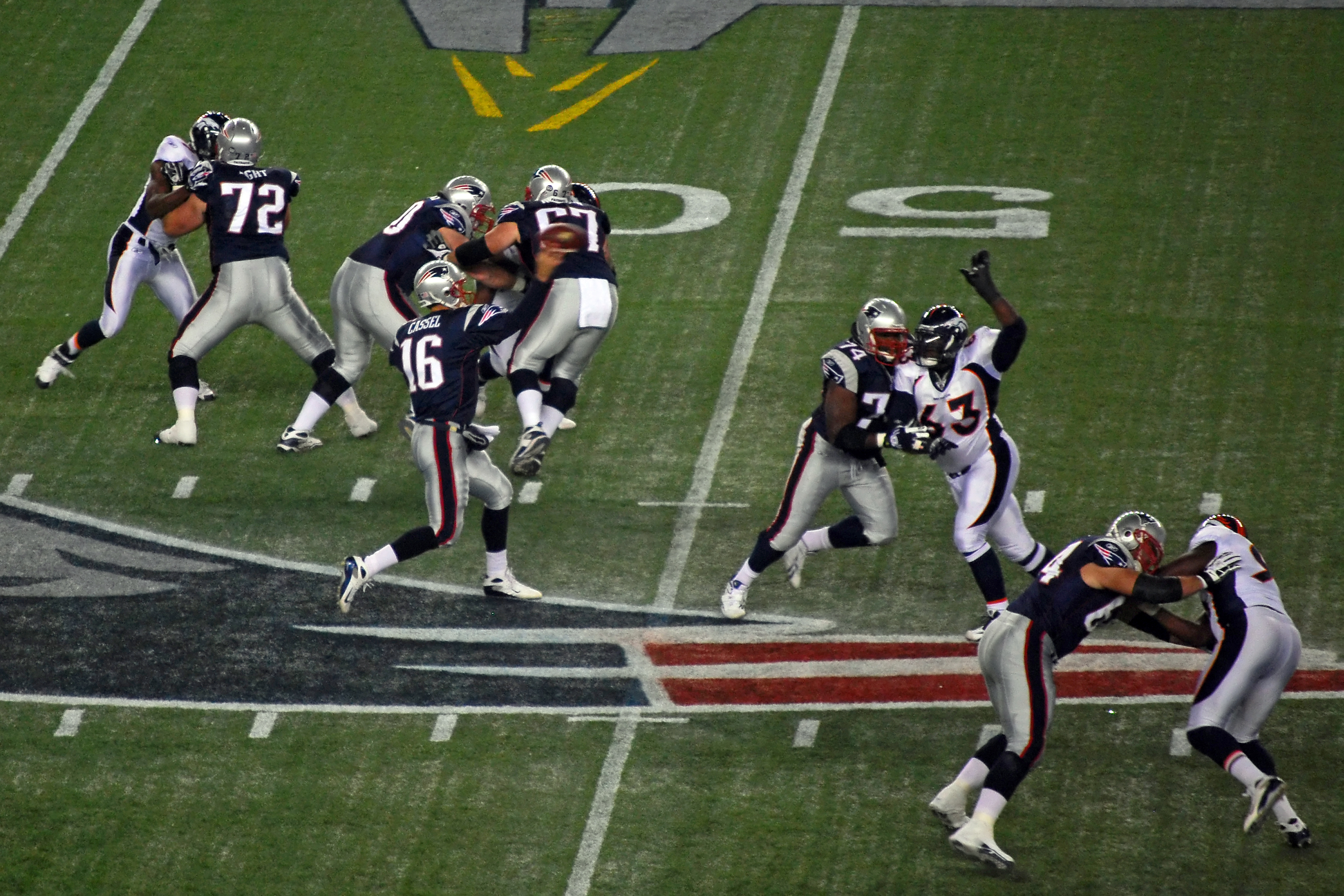
Broncos on defense at New England

Hoping to rebound from their home loss to the Jaguars, the Broncos flew to Gillette Stadium for a Week 7 Monday Night duel with the New England Patriots. In the first quarter, Denver trailed early as Patriots kicker Stephen Gostkowski nailed a 31-yard and a 40-yard field goal. In the second quarter, New England increased its lead with running back Sammy Morris getting a 4-yard touchdown run, along with quarterback Matt Cassel completing a 13-yard touchdown pass to wide receiver Randy Moss. In the third quarter, the Broncos continued to struggle as Cassel hooked up with Moss again on a 27-yard touchdown pass, along with completing a 6-yard touchdown pass to wide receiver Wes Welker. In the fourth quarter, Denver avoided a shutout loss as quarterback Jay Cutler completing a 10-yard touchdown pass to former Patriots tight end Daniel Graham. The Patriots sealed the win with running back BenJarvus Green-Ellis getting a 1-yard touchdown run.

With the loss, the Broncos went into their bye week at 4–3.

==== Week 9: vs. Miami Dolphins ====
Quarter	1	2	3	4	Total
**Dolphins**	13	3	0	10	**26**
Broncos	7	0	3	7	**17**

at Invesco Field at Mile High, Denver

- Game time: 4:05 PM EST
- Game weather: 77 °F (25 °C), partly cloudy
- Game attendance: 75,499
- Referee: Tony Corrente
- TV announcers (CBS): Greg Gumbel & Dan Dierdorf

Coming off their bye week, the Broncos went home for a Week 9 duel with the Miami Dolphins. In the first quarter, Denver trailed early as Dolphins kicker Dan Carpenter got a 45-yard and a 47-yard field goal, along with cornerback Will Allen returning an interception 32 yards for a touchdown. The Broncos answered with quarterback Jay Cutler completing a 2-yard touchdown pass to rookie wide receiver Eddie Royal. In the second quarter, Miami answered with Carpenter getting a 23-yard field goal.

In the third quarter, Denver tried to rally as kicker Matt Prater got a 50-yard field goal. In the fourth quarter, the Dolphins replied with Carpenter nailing a 41-yard field goal. The Broncos tried to come back as Cutler completed a 1-yard touchdown pass to rookie fullback Peyton Hillis. However, Miami pulled away as running back Ronnie Brown got a 2-yard touchdown run.

With their third-straight loss, Denver fell to 4–4.

==== Week 10: at Cleveland Browns ====
Quarter	1	2	3	4	Total
**Broncos**	7	3	3	21	**34**
Browns	7	13	3	7	**30**

at Cleveland Browns Stadium, Cleveland, Ohio

- Game time: 8:15 PM EST/6:15 PM MST
- Game weather: 56 °F (13 °C), clear
- Game attendance: 73,141
- Referee: Bill Leavy
- TV announcers (NFL Network): Bob Papa & Cris Collinsworth

Hoping to rebound from their home loss to the Dolphins, the Broncos flew to Cleveland Browns Stadium for a Week 10 Thursday night duel with the Cleveland Browns. In the first quarter, Denver struck first as rookie running back Ryan Torain got a 1-yard touchdown run. The Browns responded with quarterback Brady Quinn completing a 5-yard touchdown pass to tight end Kellen Winslow II. In the second quarter, Cleveland took the lead as kicker Phil Dawson got a 24-yard field goal and Quinn hooking up with Winslow again on a 16-yard touchdown pass. The Broncos answered with kicker Matt Prater getting a 35-yard field goal. The Browns closed out the half with Dawson making a 52-yard field goal.

In the third quarter, Denver continued to struggle as Dawson gave Cleveland a 33-yard field goal. Denver replied with Prater making a 30-yard field goal. In the fourth quarter, the Broncos regained the lead as quarterback Jay Cutler completed a 93-yard touchdown pass to rookie wide receiver Eddie Royal and a 27-yard touchdown pass to tight end Daniel Graham. The Browns answered with running back Jamal Lewis getting a 1-yard touchdown run. Afterwards, Denver sealed the win as Cutler completed an 11-yard touchdown pass to wide receiver Brandon Marshall.

With the win, the Broncos improved to 5–4.

This also marked Denver's eighth-straight victory over Cleveland.

Cutler had a career game, completing 24 of 42 passes for a career-best 447 yards, along with 3 touchdowns and 1 interception.

==== Week 11: at Atlanta Falcons ====
Quarter	1	2	3	4	Total
**Broncos**	7	0	7	10	**24**
Falcons	3	10	0	7	**20**

at Georgia Dome, Atlanta

- Game time: 1:00 PM EST/11:00 AM MST
- Game weather: Played indoors (dome stadium)
- Game attendance: 54,644
- Referee: Peter Morelli
- TV announcers (CBS): Kevin Harlan & Rich Gannon

Coming off their Thursday night road win over the Browns, the Broncos flew to the Georgia Dome for a Week 11 interconference duel with the Atlanta Falcons. In the first quarter, Denver drew first blood as rookie fullback Peyton Hillis got a 7-yard touchdown run. The Falcons answered with former Broncos kicker Jason Elam getting a 46-yard field goal. In the second quarter, Atlanta took the lead as Elam made a 36-yard field goal, while running back Michael Turner got a 9-yard touchdown run. This was Matt Ryan's first loss at the Georgia Dome.

In the third quarter, Denver regained the lead as Hillis got a 2-yard touchdown run. In the fourth quarter, the Broncos increased their lead as kicker Matt Prater nailed a 20-yard field goal. The Falcons tried to rally as Turner got a 28-yard touchdown run, yet Denver replied as quarterback Jay Cutler completed a 9-yard touchdown pass to tight end Daniel Graham.

With the win, the Broncos improved to 6–4.

On a side note, rookie fullback Spencer Larsen became the first player in franchise history to start on offense and defense. In addition to his fullback duties, he also started as middle linebacker, along with his special teams responsibilities.

==== Week 12: vs. Oakland Raiders ====
Quarter	1	2	3	4	Total
**Raiders**	0	10	7	14	**31**
Broncos	0	3	7	0	**10**

at Invesco Field at Mile High, Denver

- Game time: 4:05 PM EDT/2:05 PM MST
- Game weather: 47 °F (8 °C), partly cloudy
- Game attendance: 76,067
- Referee: Jeff Triplette
- TV announcers (CBS): Dick Enberg & Randy Cross

Coming off their road win over the Falcons, the Broncos went home for a Week 12 AFC West rematch with the Oakland Raiders. After a scoreless first quarter, Denver trailed in the second quarter as Raiders kicker Sebastian Janikowski got a 26-yard field goal. The Broncos responded with kicker Matt Prater getting a 44-yard field goal, yet the Raiders got the halftime lead as wide receiver Johnnie Lee Higgins returned a punt 89 yards for a touchdown.

In the third quarter, Denver tied the game again as rookie fullback Peyton Hillis got a 6-yard touchdown run. However, Oakland replied with running back Darren McFadden getting a 1-yard touchdown run. In the fourth quarter, the Raiders pulled away as quarterback JaMarcus Russell completed a 4-yard touchdown pass to wide receiver Ashley Lelie (a former Bronco), while McFadden got another 1-yard touchdown run.

With the surprising loss, Denver fell to 6–5.

==== Week 13: at New York Jets ====
Quarter	1	2	3	4	Total
**Broncos**	17	10	0	7	**34**
Jets	7	7	3	0	**17**

at The Meadowlands, East Rutherford, New Jersey

- Game time: 4:15 PM EST/2:15 PM MST
- Game weather: 36 °F (2 °C), rainy
- Game attendance: 78,809
- Referee: Walt Coleman
- TV announcers (CBS): Kevin Harlan and Rich Gannon

Hoping to rebound from their home loss to the Raiders, the Broncos flew to The Meadowlands for a Week 13 duel with the New York Jets, considered one of the best teams in the league, fresh off their victory over the undefeated Tennessee Titans. In the first quarter, Denver drew first blood as safety Vernon Fox returned a fumble 23 yards for a touchdown. The Jets responded with running back Thomas Jones getting a 59-yard touchdown run. The Broncos answered with quarterback Jay Cutler completing a 59-yard touchdown pass to rookie wide receiver Eddie Royal, along with kicker Matt Prater getting a 25-yard field goal. In the second quarter, New York drew close as Jones got a 29-yard touchdown run. The Broncos replied with rookie running back Peyton Hillis getting a 1-yard touchdown run, while Prater got a 35-yard field goal.

In the third quarter, the Jets tried to rally as kicker Jay Feely nailed a 30-yard field goal. In the fourth quarter, Denver pulled away as Cutler completed a 36-yard touchdown pass to wide receiver Brandon Stokley.

With the win, the Broncos improved to 7–5.

==== Week 14: vs. Kansas City Chiefs ====
Quarter	1	2	3	4	Total
Chiefs	10	7	0	0	**17**
**Broncos**	7	7	3	7	**24**

at Invesco Field at Mile High, Denver, Colorado

- Game time: 4:05 PM EST
- Game weather: 64 °F (18 °C), partly cloudy
- Game attendance: 75,187
- Referee: Scott Green
- TV announcers (CBS): Bill Macatee and Steve Beuerlein

Fresh off their road win over the Jets, the Broncos went home, donned their alternate uniforms again, and played a Week 14 AFC West rematch with the Kansas City Chiefs. Denver trailed early in the first quarter as Chiefs kicker Connor Barth made a 26-yard field goal, along with cornerback Maurice Leggett returning an interception 27 yards for a touchdown. The Broncos closed out the period's scoring with rookie running back Peyton Hillis getting an 18-yard touchdown run. Kansas City answered in the second quarter as quarterback Tyler Thigpen completed a 13-yard touchdown pass to tight end Tony Gonzalez, but Denver did close out the half with quarterback Jay Cutler completing a 12-yard touchdown pass to wide receiver Brandon Marshall.

The Broncos tied the game in the third quarter as kicker Matt Prater nailed a 33-yard field goal. Afterwards, in the fourth quarter, Denver took the lead as Cutler hooked up with Marshall again on a 6-yard touchdown pass. From there, the defense prevented any possible rally from the Chiefs.

With the win, the Broncos improved to 8–5.

==== Week 15: at Carolina Panthers ====
Quarter	1	2	3	4	Total
Broncos	10	0	0	0	**10**
**Panthers**	10	10	7	3	**30**

at Bank of America Stadium, Charlotte, North Carolina

- Game time: 4:15 p.m. EST
- Game weather: 46 °F (8 °C), cloudy
- Game attendance: 73,690
- Referee: Alberto Riveron
- TV announcers (CBS): Dick Enberg, Randy Cross, & Dan Fouts

Coming off from their divisional home win over the Chiefs, the Broncos flew to Charlotte for a Week 15 interconference duel with the Carolina Panthers. In the first quarter, Denver drew first blood as quarterback Jay Cutler completed a 7-yard touchdown pass to running back P.J. Pope. Carolina soon responded with quarterback Jake Delhomme completing a 15-yard touchdown pass to wide receiver Steve Smith, yet Denver answered with kicker Matt Prater nailing a 43-yard field goal. Carolina kicker John Kasay tied the game with a 39-yard field goal. In the second quarter, Carolina took the lead with rookie running back Jonathan Stewart getting a 2-yard touchdown run, while Kasay closed out the half with a 44-yard field goal.

In the third quarter, Carolina increased its lead with running back DeAngelo Williams's 56-yard TD run for the only score of the period. In the fourth quarter, Carolina sealed the win with Kasay's 42-yard field goal.

With the loss, Denver fell to 8–6.

==== Week 16: vs. Buffalo Bills ====
Quarter	1	2	3	4	Total
**Bills**	0	10	6	14	**30**
Broncos	10	3	7	3	**23**

at Invesco Field at Mile High, Denver, Colorado

- Game time: 4:05 PM EST
- Game weather: 17 °F (−8 °C), sunny
- Game attendance: 74,539
- Referee: Terry McAulay
- TV announcers (CBS): Ian Eagle and Solomon Wilcots

Hoping to rebound from their road loss to the Panthers, the Broncos went home for a Week 16 duel with the Buffalo Bills. Denver stormed out to an early first-quarter lead as quarterback Jay Cutler got a 2-yard touchdown run, while kicker Matt Prater got a 23-yard field goal. In the second quarter, the Broncos extended their lead as Prater made a 30-yard field goal. The Bills got on the board with a 37-yard field goal from kicker Rian Lindell, followed by a 2-yard touchdown run from running back Marshawn Lynch.

Buffalo took the lead in the third quarter as Lindell got a 49-yard and a 28-yard field goal, yet Denver regained the lead with Cutler getting a 6-yard touchdown run. In the fourth quarter, the Bills answered with quarterback Trent Edwards completing a 3-yard touchdown pass to wide receiver Stevie Johnson. The Broncos tied the game with Prater nailing a 43-yard field goal, but Buffalo got the lead again as running back Fred Jackson made an 8-yard touchdown run. Denver put together a late-game drive, but it ended up fizzling down the stretch.

With the loss, the Broncos fell to 8–7.

==== Week 17: at San Diego Chargers ====
Quarter	1	2	3	4	Total
Broncos	6	0	7	8	**21**
**Chargers**	10	14	14	14	**52**

at Qualcomm Stadium, San Diego

- Game time: 8:15 p.m. EST
- Game weather: 58 °F (14 °C), clear
- Game attendance: 69,131
- Referee: John Parry
- TV announcers (NBC): Al Michaels, John Madden, & Andrea Kremer

Hoping to hold on to their divisional lead, the Broncos closed out the regular season at Qualcomm Stadium in a crucial Week 17 AFC West rematch with the San Diego Chargers.

Denver trailed early in the first quarter as Chargers kicker Nate Kaeding got a 28-yard field goal. The Broncos responded with running back Tatum Bell's 26-yard touchdown run (with a failed PAT), but San Diego took the lead again as running back LaDainian Tomlinson got a 1-yard touchdown run. Denver's deficit increased in the second quarter as quarterback Philip Rivers completed a 12-yard touchdown pass to tight end Brandon Manumaleuna, along with Tomlinson's 4-yard touchdown run.

In the third quarter, the Broncos tried to rally as Bell got a 37-yard touchdown run, yet the Chargers replied again as Rivers completed a 13-yard touchdown pass to running back Darren Sproles, followed by Tomlinson's 14-yard touchdown run. Denver tried to come back in the fourth quarter as quarterback Jay Cutler completed a 25-yard touchdown pass to tight end Tony Scheffler and ran into the endzone for the 2-point conversion. However, San Diego ran away with the division crown with Sproles' 2-yard touchdown run and fullback Jacob Hester's 4-yard touchdown.

With the loss, the Broncos' season ended at 8–8. In the process, they became the first team in NFL history to enter the final three weeks of a regular season with a three-game lead and lose all three games.

== Standings ==
AFC West
	W	L	T	PCT	DIV	CONF	PF	PA	STK
^{(4)} San Diego Chargers	8	8	0	.500	5–1	7–5	439	347	W4
Denver Broncos	8	8	0	.500	3–3	5–7	370	448	L3
Oakland Raiders	5	11	0	.313	2–4	4–8	263	388	W2
Kansas City Chiefs	2	14	0	.125	2–4	2–10	291	440	L4
