= List of McNeese Cowboys in the NFL draft =

This is a list of McNeese Cowboys football players in the NFL draft. Note that McNeese State University branded its athletic program as "McNeese State" until dropping the word "State" effective with the 2015–16 school year.

== Key ==
B	Back	K	Kicker	NT	Nose tackle
C	Center	LB	Linebacker	FB	Fullback
DB	Defensive back	P	Punter	HB	Halfback
DE	Defensive end	QB	Quarterback	WR	Wide receiver
DT	Defensive tackle	RB	Running back	G	Guard
E	End	T	Offensive tackle	TE	Tight end

== Selections ==
Year	Round	Pick	Overall	Player	Team	Position
1956	19	11	228	Charlie Dees	Los Angeles Rams	T
1956	24	10	287	Jesse Castete	Chicago Bears	B
1957	11	11	132	Roger Hampton	Chicago Bears	B
1958	18	6	211	Coy Scott	Los Angeles Rams	T
1961	13	9	177	Julius Fincke	San Francisco 49ers	T
1962	16	10	220	Tom Sestak	Detroit Lions	E
1963	16	1	211	Walter Burden	Los Angeles Rams	RB
1964	9	6	118	Darrell Lester	Minnesota Vikings	RB
1965	11	9	149	Merlin Walet	Los Angeles Rams	RB
1965	20	14	280	George Haffner	Baltimore Colts	QB
1967	15	20	387	David Poche	Philadelphia Eagles	T
1971	10	17	251	Ron Miller	St. Louis Cardinals	T
1972	14	26	364	Mike O'Quinn	Washington Redskins	G
1976	2	28	56	James Files	Pittsburgh Steelers	C
1979	4	23	105	Charles Jefferson	Denver Broncos	DB
1979	9	23	243	Rich Ellender	Houston Oilers	WR
1980	5	3	113	Bryan Hicks	Cincinnati Bengals	DB
1980	12	26	331	Harry Price	San Diego Chargers	WR
1982	3	18	73	Rusty Guilbeau	St. Louis Cardinals	DE
1983	1	17	17	Leonard Smith	St. Louis Cardinals	DB
1983	3	18	74	Stephen Starring	New England Patriots	WR
1983	8	20	216	Carlton Briscoe	Green Bay Packers	DB
1984	8	25	221	Ronnie Landry	Miami Dolphins	RB
1994	4	12	115	Terry Irving	St. Louis Cardinals	LB
1995	5	29	163	Ronald Cherry	Detroit Lions	T
1996	2	7	37	Kavika Pittman	Dallas Cowboys	DE
1999	5	1	134	Cecil Collins	Miami Dolphins	RB
1999	5	8	141	Reggie Nelson	San Diego Chargers	G
2004	3	10	73	Keith Smith	Detroit Lions	DB
2008	3	17	80	Bryan Smith	Philadelphia Eagles	LB
2009	6	2	175	Quinten Lawrence	Kansas City Chiefs	WR

== Notable undrafted players ==
Note: No drafts held before 1920

Debut year	Player name	Position	Debut NFL/AFL team	Notes
1949	Wayne Kingery	HB	Baltimore Colts	
1963	Don Breaux	QB	Denver Broncos	
1985	Keith Ortego	WR	Chicago Bears	
1988	Flip Johnson	WR	Buffalo Bills	
1994	Adam Henry	WR	New Orleans Saints	
1996	Kerry Joseph	QB	Cincinnati Bengals	
1997	Zack Bronson	S	San Francisco 49ers	
1998	Chris Fontenot	TE	Miami Dolphins	
1999	Delphfrine Lee	DB	New York Jets	
2001	Jimmy Redmond	WR/ST	Tennessee Titans	
2004	Vick King	RB	Tennessee Titans	
2004	Luke Lawton	FB	Buffalo Bills	
2004	B. J. Sams	RB	Baltimore Ravens	
2008	Darrick Brown	CB	Oakland Raiders	
2008	Marcus Brown	CB	Arizona Cardinals	
2011	Devin Holland	S	Tampa Bay Buccaneers	
2012	Janzen Jackson	FS/PR	New York Giants	
2014	Nic Jacobs	TE	New Orleans Saints	
2014	Diontae Spencer	WR/RS	St. Louis Rams	
