= List of Richmond Spiders in the NFL draft =

This is a List of Richmond Spiders football players in the NFL draft.

== Key ==
B	Back	K	Kicker	NT	Nose tackle
C	Center	LB	Linebacker	FB	Fullback
DB	Defensive back	P	Punter	HB	Halfback
DE	Defensive end	QB	Quarterback	WR	Wide receiver
DT	Defensive tackle	RB	Running back	G	Guard
E	End	T	Offensive tackle	TE	Tight end

== Selections ==
Year	Round	Pick	Overall	Player	Team	Position
1941	2	1	11	Art Jones	Philadelphia Eagles	B
1944	24	11	252	Courtney Lawlor	Boston Yanks	B
1947	12	4	99	U. S. Savage	Washington Redskins	E
1947	18	4	159	Tom Nichols	Washington Redskins	B
1950	29	13	378	Wes Curtier	Philadelphia Eagles	T
1954	15	9	178	Ed Elliot	Los Angeles Rams	B
1955	7	3	76	Erik Christensen	Washington Redskins	E
1956	4	3	40	Frank Pajaczkowski	San Francisco 49ers	B
1956	11	1	122	Lew Wacker	Detroit Lions	B
1958	17	4	197	Dick Eaton	Chicago Bears	C
1958	17	5	198	Fred Wilt	Washington Redskins	T
1959	13	2	146	Pat Lamberti	Chicago Cardinals	E
1959	21	5	245	Buddy Davis	Detroit Lions	B
1959	27	11	323	Joe Biscaha	New York Giants	E
1960	16	6	186	Dave Ames	Pittsburgh Steelers	B
1961	12	3	157	Bob Coolbaugh	Washington Redskins	E
1962	18	9	247	Mel Rideout	Baltimore Colts	QB
1963	5	5	61	Bill Ventura	Baltimore Colts	T
1964	6	6	76	John Hilton	Detroit Lions	E
1964	10	5	131	Ron C. Smith	Los Angeles Rams	QB
1968	5	6	117	Mike Bragg	Washington Redskins	K
1969	17	9	425	Buster O'Brien	Denver Broncos	QB
1970	1	15	15	Walker Gillette	San Diego Chargers	WR
1970	7	5	161	Wayne Fowler	Buffalo Bills	T
1971	3	9	61	James Livesay	St. Louis Cardinals	WR
1971	11	20	280	Charlie Richards	Los Angeles Rams	QB
1972	9	15	223	Ray Easterling	Atlanta Falcons	DB
1974	1	12	12	Barty Smith	Green Bay Packers	RB
1974	15	5	369	Pat Kelly	Baltimore Colts	LB
1975	9	2	210	Mike Mahoney	New York Giants	WR
1975	9	24	232	Harry Knight	Oakland Raiders	QB
1978	12	23	329	Bruce Allen	Baltimore Colts	P
1979	4	5	87	Jeff Nixon	Buffalo Bills	DB
1982	1	14	14	Barry Redden	Los Angeles Rams	RB
1982	12	17	323	Mark Seale	New York Giants	DT
1986	11	9	286	John Armstron	Minnesota Vikings	WR
1986	11	13	290	Leland D. Melvin	Detroit Lions	WR
1987	10	27	278	Rafe Wilkinson	Denver Broncos	LB
1989	7	6	173	Brian Jordan	Buffalo Bills	DB
1991	11	16	294	James Smith	Houston Oilers	DB
1998	4	21	113	Shawn Barber	Washington Redskins	LB
1999	6	14	183	Marc Megna	New York Jets	LB
1999	7	14	220	Eric King	Kansas City Chiefs	G
2000	5	25	154	Muneer Moore	Denver Broncos	WR
2008	4	26	125	Arman Shields	Oakland Raiders	WR
2008	5	14	149	Tim Hightower	Arizona Cardinals	RB
2009	4	25	125	Lawrence Sidbury	Atlanta Falcons	DE
2011	7	3	206	Justin Rogers	Buffalo Bills	DB
2013	5	19	152	Cooper Taylor	New York Giants	DB
2018	4	8	108	Kyle Lauletta	New York Giants	QB

== Notable undrafted players ==
Note: No drafts held before 1936

Debut year	Player name	Position	Debut NFL/AFL team	Notes
1960	Carmen Cavalli	DE	Oakland Raiders	—
1964	Bruce Gossett	K	Los Angeles Rams	—
1965	Pete Emelianchik	TE	Philadelphia Eagles	—
1967	Larry Zunich	RB	St. Louis Cardinals	—
1982	Steve Krainock	QB	Seattle Seahawks	—
1983	Reggie Evans	RB	Washington Redskins	—
1987	Bob Bleier	QB	New England Patriots	—
1987	Brendan Toibin	K	Washington Redskins	—
1994	Matt Joyce	G	Dallas Cowboys	—
1999	Matt Snider	FB	Carolina Panthers	—
2000	Paris Lenon	LB	Carolina Panthers	—
2012	Aaron Corp	QB	Buffalo Bills	—
2017	Winston Craig	DT	Philadelphia Eagles	—
2017	Thomas Evans	G	Green Bay Packers	—
2017	David Jones	S	New England Patriots	—
2018	Alex Light	T	Green Bay Packers	—
2024	Ryan Coll	C	Atlanta Falcons	—
