= Rashad Baker =

American football player (born 1982)

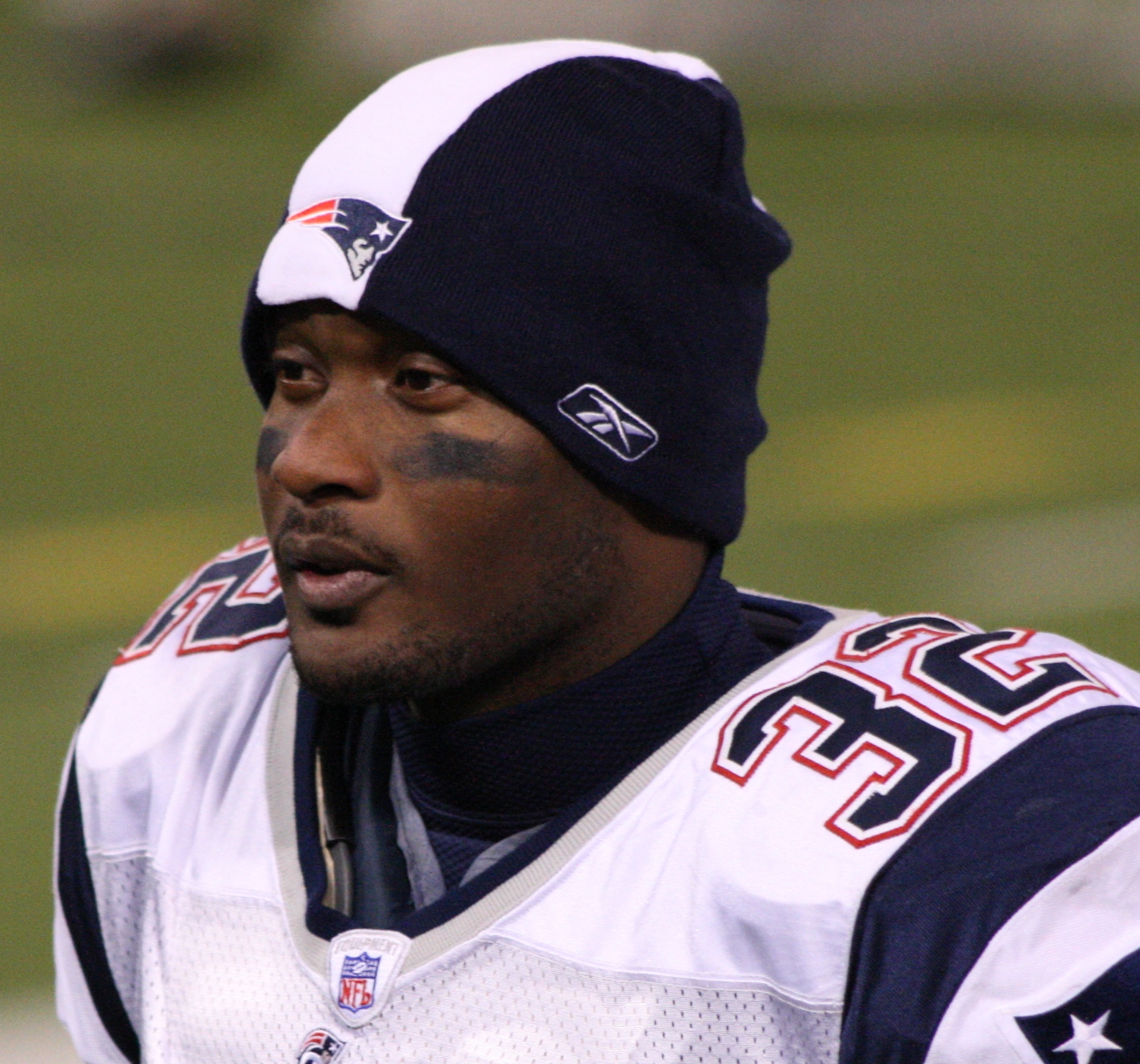
- Baker in December 2007

No. 26, 28, 32, 27
- Position: Safety

Personal information
- Born: February 22, 1982 (age 44); Camden, New Jersey, U.S.
- Listed height: 5 ft 10 in (1.78 m)
- Listed weight: 200 lb (91 kg)

Career information
- College: Tennessee
- NFL draft: 2004: undrafted

Career history
- Buffalo Bills (2004–2005); Minnesota Vikings (2006); New England Patriots (2006–2007); Oakland Raiders (2007–2008); Philadelphia Eagles (2009)*; Oakland Raiders (2009)
- * Offseason or practice squad member only

Awards and highlights
- First-team All-SEC (2002); Second-team All-SEC (2003); Third-team Freshman All-American (2000)

Career NFL statistics
- Total tackles: 78
- Sacks: 1
- Forced fumbles: 1
- Pass deflections: 8
- Interceptions: 5
- Stats at Pro Football Reference

Rashad Steward Baker (born February 22, 1982) is an American former professional football player who was a safety in the National Football League (NFL). He played college football for the Tennessee Volunteers and was signed by the Buffalo Bills as an undrafted free agent in 2004.

Baker was also a member of the Minnesota Vikings, New England Patriots, Philadelphia Eagles and Oakland Raiders.

== Early life and college career ==
Born in Camden, New Jersey, Baker attended Woodrow Wilson High School in Camden. Baker then attended the University of Tennessee. Although Tennessee recruited Baker as a wide receiver, Baker switched to free safety in the fourth game his freshman year; Baker never played as free safety while in high school. Baker started four seasons for the Tennessee Volunteers football team from 2000 to 2003 and also ran 110-meter hurdles on the Tennessee track team. With Tennessee, Baker started 41 of 45 games played and had 233 tackles, 11 interceptions, and 24 passes deflected. Baker made second-team All-SEC honors in 2001 as a sophomore and first-team All-SEC honors as a junior in 2002.

== Professional career ==
Pre-draft measurables
Height	Weight	Arm length	Hand span	40-yard dash	10-yard split	20-yard split	20-yard shuttle	Three-cone drill	Vertical jump	Broad jump	Bench press
5 ft 10 in (1.78 m)	204 lb (93 kg)	30 5/8 in (0.78 m)	9 5/8 in (0.24 m)	4.45 s	1.57 s	2.65 s	4.15 s	7.21 s	36 in (0.91 m)	9 ft 9 in (2.97 m)	21 reps
All values from NFL Scouting Combine; see also scouting report

=== Buffalo Bills ===
A projected sixth-round pick for the 2004 NFL draft, Baker was signed by the Buffalo Bills as an undrafted free agent in 2004 and played for the team through the 2006 season. Baker started 3 games of 14 played in his rookie season 2004 and never started any of 14 games played in 2005. As a rookie, Baker had 22 tackles, 1 pass deflected, 1 interception with a 26-yard return, and 1 forced fumble in 2004. In 2005, Baker had 18 tackles, 1 pass deflected, and 1 interception returned for 18 yards.

=== Minnesota Vikings ===
On September 2, 2006, the Bills waived Baker. The Minnesota Vikings signed Baker the next day. Baker played one game as a reserve for the Vikings on October 1 and was released on November 4.

=== New England Patriots ===
Baker was claimed off waivers by the New England Patriots on November 7, 2006. He played 5 games with the Patriots in 2006 with 5 tackles. In 2007, Baker played 8 games and had 12 tackles. He was released on December 19, 2007.

=== Oakland Raiders ===
Baker was picked up by the Oakland Raiders off waivers on the same day he was waived by New England. In the 2008 offseason, Baker's jersey number was changed from 28 to 22 to accommodate free agent acquisition Gibril Wilson. He later changed his number to 27. In 2008, Baker played 10 games with 1 start for the Raiders and made 24 tackles, 4 passes deflected, and 3 interceptions.

=== Philadelphia Eagles ===
Baker signed a one-year contract with the Philadelphia Eagles on March 11, 2009. He was released on August 18.

=== Oakland Raiders (second stint) ===
Baker re-signed with the Raiders on August 19, 2009. His number 27 was taken by Jason Horton, so Baker chose number 32. He was released from the Raiders on September 5, 2009.

== NFL statistics ==
Year	Team	Games		Tackles				Fumbles			Interceptions					
Year	Team	G	GS	Comb	Total	Ast	Sack	FF	FR	Yds	Int	Yds	Avg	Lng	TD	PD
2004	BUF	14	03	22	13	9	0.0	1	0	0	1	26	26	26	0	2
2005	BUF	10	00	5	1	4	1.0	0	0	0	1	18	18	18	0	2
2006	MIN/NE	06	00	2	1	1	0.0	0	0	0	0	0	0	0	0	0
2007	NE	08	00	12	9	3	0.0	0	0	0	0	0	0	0	0	0
2008	BAL	10	01	24	21	3	0.0	0	0	0	3	8	2.7	8	0	4
Career		52	4	78	57	21	1.5	1	0	0	5	52	10.4	26	0	8
