= Derrick Gray =

American gridiron football player (born 1985)

No. 76, 95
- Position: Defensive end

Personal information
- Born: November 11, 1985 (age 40); Silver Spring, Maryland, U.S.
- Listed height: 6 ft 4 in (1.93 m)
- Listed weight: 265 lb (120 kg)

Career information
- College: Texas Southern
- NFL draft: 2008: undrafted

Career history
- Oakland Raiders (2008–2009)*; California Redwoods (2009); Calgary Stampeders (2010)
- * Offseason or practice squad member only

Awards and highlights
- Second-team All-SWAC (2007)

Derrick Gray (born November 11, 1985) is an American former football defensive end. He was signed by the Oakland Raiders as an undrafted free agent in 2008. He played college football at Texas Southern.

He was also a member of the California Redwoods and Calgary Stampeders.
