= Carlton Powell =

American football player (born 1985)

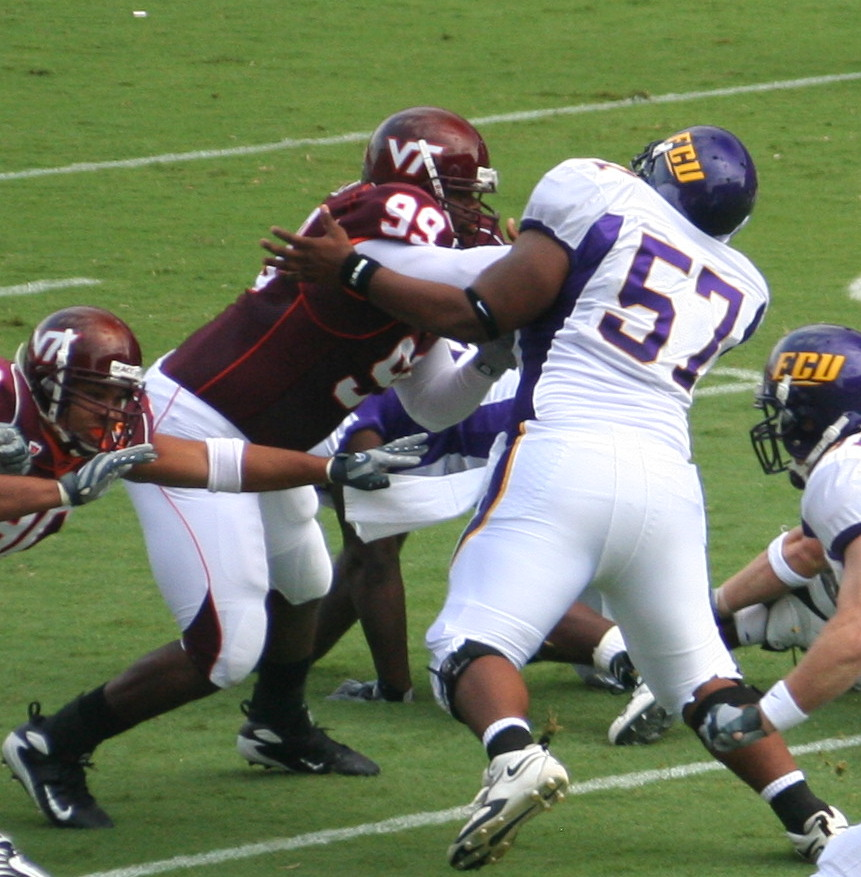
- Powers (99) with the Virginia Tech Hokies in 2007

No. 97
- Position: Defensive tackle

Personal information
- Born: August 14, 1985 (age 41); Norfolk, Virginia, U.S.
- Listed height: 6 ft 2 in (1.88 m)
- Listed weight: 301 lb (137 kg)

Career information
- High school: Great Bridge (Chesapeake, Virginia)
- College: Virginia Tech
- NFL draft: 2008: 5th round, 148th overall pick

Career history
- Denver Broncos (2008); Cleveland Browns (2009)*; Denver Broncos (2009)*; Tampa Bay Buccaneers (2010)*; New York Jets (2011)*; Atlanta Falcons (2011); New York Giants (2012)*
- * Offseason or practice squad member only

Career NFL statistics
- Total tackles: 1
- Stats at Pro Football Reference

Carlton Eugene Powell, Jr. (born August 14, 1985) is an American former professional football player who was a defensive tackle in the National Football League (NFL). He played college football for the Virginia Tech Hokies and was selected by the Denver Broncos in the fifth round of the 2008 NFL draft.

Powell was also a member of the Cleveland Browns, Tampa Bay Buccaneers, New York Jets, Atlanta Falcons, and New York Giants.

== Professional career ==
Pre-draft measurables
Height	Weight	40-yard dash	10-yard split	20-yard split	20-yard shuttle	Three-cone drill	Vertical jump	Broad jump	Bench press	Wonderlic
6 ft 2 in (1.88 m)	292 lb (132 kg)	5.10 s	1.65 s	2.93 s	4.87 s	7.78 s	22.5 in (0.57 m)	9 ft 0 in (2.74 m)	23 reps	-
Results taken from NFL Combine workout.

=== Denver Broncos (first stint) ===
Powell was selected by the Denver Broncos in the fifth round with the 148th overall pick of the 2008 NFL draft. He was placed on the PUP list on July 25, 2008, with a ruptured Achilles tendon. He was waived on September 4, 2009.

=== Cleveland Browns ===
Powell was signed to the Cleveland Browns practice squad on October 6, 2009, and released on October 20.

=== Denver Broncos (second stint) ===
Powell was re-signed by the Broncos on November 3, 2009, and placed on the practice squad.

=== Tampa Bay Buccaneers ===
Powell was signed by the Tampa Bay Buccaneers on May 18, 2010. He was released on September 4.

=== New York Jets ===
Powell was signed to a reserve/future contract by the New York Jets on January 5, 2011. He was waived on August 11.

=== Atlanta Falcons ===
On August 14, 2011, Powell signed with the Atlanta Falcons. He was released on December 2, 2011. He was signed to the practice squad on December 6, 2011.

=== New York Giants ===
Powell was signed by the New York Giants on August 14, 2012.
