= Greyson Gunheim =

American football player (born 1986)

No. 97
- Position: Defensive end

Personal information
- Born: April 8, 1986 (age 40); Sebastopol, California, U.S.
- Listed height: 6 ft 5 in (1.96 m)
- Listed weight: 265 lb (120 kg)

Career information
- College: Washington
- NFL draft: 2008: undrafted

Career history
- Oakland Raiders (2008–2009)

Awards and highlights
- Sporting News Freshman All-Pac-10 (2004)

Career NFL statistics
- Total tackles: 2
- Sacks: 1
- Stats at Pro Football Reference

Greyson Gregory Gunheim (born April 4, 1986) is an American former professional football player who was a defensive end for the Oakland Raiders of the National Football League (NFL). He was signed by the Raiders as an undrafted free agent in 2008. He played college football for the Washington Huskies.

== Early life ==
Prior to attending Washington Gunheim was a stand-out player at Analy High School in Sebastopol, California where he was one of the most heavily recruited players in Redwood Empire history. He was named his area's defensive player of the year by the Petaluma (Calif.) Argus Courier. He was also named to California's First-team All-state defensive team for mid-sized schools. As a senior, he rushed for 1,700 yards and 25 touchdowns, but stood out even more as a defensive lineman, he had 55 tackles and 11 sacks and helped team to a 9-3 record as a senior. He was also a member of the Analy basketball team. Gunheim is considered the greatest Tiger athlete since Chip "The Skip" Castleberry.

On June 25, 2010, he married Katie Zagroba in his hometown of Sebastopol, California.

== College career ==
Gunheim played in all 11 games and started the final seven in 2004 and finished the year with 16 tackles, 3.5 tackles for loss and 1.5 sacks and was named to The Sporting News 2004 Pac-10 All-Freshman team.

In 2005, he started all 11 games at defensive end led the team with 11 tackles-for-loss and tied for the team lead with five sacks to go along with his 38 total tackles and three passes defensed.

In 2006, he was honorable mention All-Pac-10 honors after playing in all 12 games and starting 10. He totaled 44 tackles, six sacks and 12 tackles for a loss.

Gunheim started all 13 games at defensive end as a senior a team captain in 2007. He ended the season with 41 tackles, 11 for a loss, 6.5 sacks and four passes defensed and an interception.

Gunheim ended his college career with 139 tackles, 37.5 for a loss, 18 sacks and 10 passes defensed.

== Professional career ==
Gunheim began the 2008 season as part of the Raiders' practice squad. He was called up to the active roster in November 2008. He played his first game November 9, 2008 against the Carolina Panthers. In his NFL debut Gunheim played on the punt return and kick-off return teams as well as three possessions at defensive-end.

Gunheim was promoted to the active roster again on December 30, 2009. He was released by the Raiders on September 4, 2010.
