= Arman Shields =

American football player (born 1985)

Profile
- Position: Wide receiver

Personal information
- Born: July 10, 1985 (age 41)
- Listed height: 6 ft 0 in (1.83 m)
- Listed weight: 194 lb (88 kg)

Career information
- High school: Gonzaga College High School (Washington, D.C.)
- College: Richmond
- NFL draft: 2008: 4th round, 125th overall pick

Career history
- Oakland Raiders (2008)

Awards and highlights
- Second-team All-Atlantic 10 (2006)
- Stats at Pro Football Reference

Arman T. Shields (born July 10, 1985) is an American former football wide receiver. He played college football for the Richmond Spiders, and was selected by the Oakland Raiders in the fourth round of the 2008 NFL draft.

== Early life ==
Arman T. Shields was born on July 10, 1985. He attended Gonzaga College High School in Washington, D.C.

== College career ==
Shield played college football for the Richmond Spiders of the University of Richmond from 2004 to 2007. He was redshirted in 2003. He earned second-team All-Atlantic 10 Conference honors in 2006 after catching five touchdowns. As a senior in 2007, he recorded 12 receptions for 107 yards in the season opener. However, he suffered a torn PCL the next week. He briefly returned for one series in an October game before missing the rest of the season due to the injury. Shields finished his college career with 160 catches for 1,930 yards and 13 touchdowns. His receptions total was the second most in school history.

== Professional career ==
Shields was the first Richmond player invited to the NFL Combine since Shawn Barber in 1998. Shields was one of the fastest players at the Combine, posting a 4.37 second 40-yard dash. He had the best 20-yard shuttle (3.96 s) and the best 60-yard shuttle (10.87 s). He was selected by the Oakland Raiders in the fourth round, with the 125th overall pick, of the 2008 NFL draft. The Daytona Beach News-Journal noted that Shields was a "surprising choice after fewer than 2,000 career yards and a serious injury." The Oakland Tribune said that Shields was a "typical boom-or-bust, 'measurables' pick by owner Al Davis", who was known for drafting fast players.

Shields missed most of spring practices in 2008 with a lower body injury. He signed with the Raiders on July 23, 2008. Davis gave Shields a $425K signing bonus. On August 30, 2008, Shields was placed on injured reserve due to a knee injury. He ended up missing the entire 2008 NFL season. On May 9, 2009, it was reported that Shields had not yet fully recovered from the injury. He was released by the Raiders on July 29, 2009, after failing a physical. In May 2010, he participated in rookie minicamp on a tryout basis with the Atlanta Falcons.

== Personal life ==
Shields' father, Bertie Shields, was a Guyanan immigrant who served in the United States Army. While stationed in South Korea in 1975, he was tasked with walking one mile through the Korean Demilitarized Zone to spy through the fence. Arman Shields became a real estate agent after his football career.
