= Darrick Brown =

American football player (born 1984)

No. 6
- Position: Cornerback

Personal information
- Born: February 18, 1984 (age 42); Tangipahoa, Louisiana, U.S.
- Listed height: 6 ft 4 in (1.93 m)
- Listed weight: 200 lb (91 kg)

Career information
- High school: Kentwood (LA)
- College: McNeese State
- NFL draft: 2008: undrafted

Career history
- Oakland Raiders (2008); New Orleans Saints (2009)*; Indianapolis Colts (2009)*; New Orleans VooDoo (2011); Allen Wranglers (2012)*
- * Offseason or practice squad member only

Career AFL statistics
- Tackles: 6
- Sacks: 0
- Forced fumbles: 1
- Stats at ArenaFan.com

Darrick Brown (born February 18, 1984) is an American former football cornerback. He played college football at McNeese State, and signed with the Oakland Raiders as an undrafted free agent in 2008. He was on the Raiders' active roster for part of the 2008 season but did not play in any games.

Brown was also a member of the New Orleans Saints, Indianapolis Colts, New Orleans VooDoo, and Allen Wranglers.
