= 2012 Jacksonville Jaguars season =

18th season in franchise history

- Owner: Shahid Khan
- General manager: Gene Smith
- Head coach: Mike Mularkey
- Offensive coordinator: Bob Bratkowski
- Defensive coordinator: Mel Tucker
- Home stadium: EverBank Field

Results
- Record: 2–14
- Division place: 4th AFC South
- Playoffs: Did not qualify
- Pro Bowlers: None

Uniform

The 2012 season was the Jacksonville Jaguars' 18th in the National Football League (NFL), their first under the ownership of Shahid Khan, and the only season for head coach Mike Mularkey. The Jaguars entered the season hoping to improve on their 5–11 record from 2011 and return to the playoffs for the first time since 2007, but did not and were eliminated from postseason contention. This season marked the third time in the last five seasons in which the Jaguars finished fourth in the AFC South. The Jaguars finished with a 2–14 record, not only tying the Kansas City Chiefs for the league's worst record of 2012, but it would also be the worst in franchise history until the team went 1–15 in 2020. Their 1–7 record at home was also their worst home record in team history.

== Offseason ==
=== Notable transactions ===
==== Acquisitions ====
- WR Laurent Robinson, free agent signed on March 14, 2012.
- QB Chad Henne, free agent signed on March 15, 2012.
- CB Aaron Ross, free agent signed on March 20, 2012.
- WR Lee Evans, free agent signed on April 16 and later released on August 12, 2012.
- RB Jalen Parmele, free agent signed on May 1, 2012.
- DE Jason Babin, claimed off waivers on November 28, 2012.

==== Departures ====
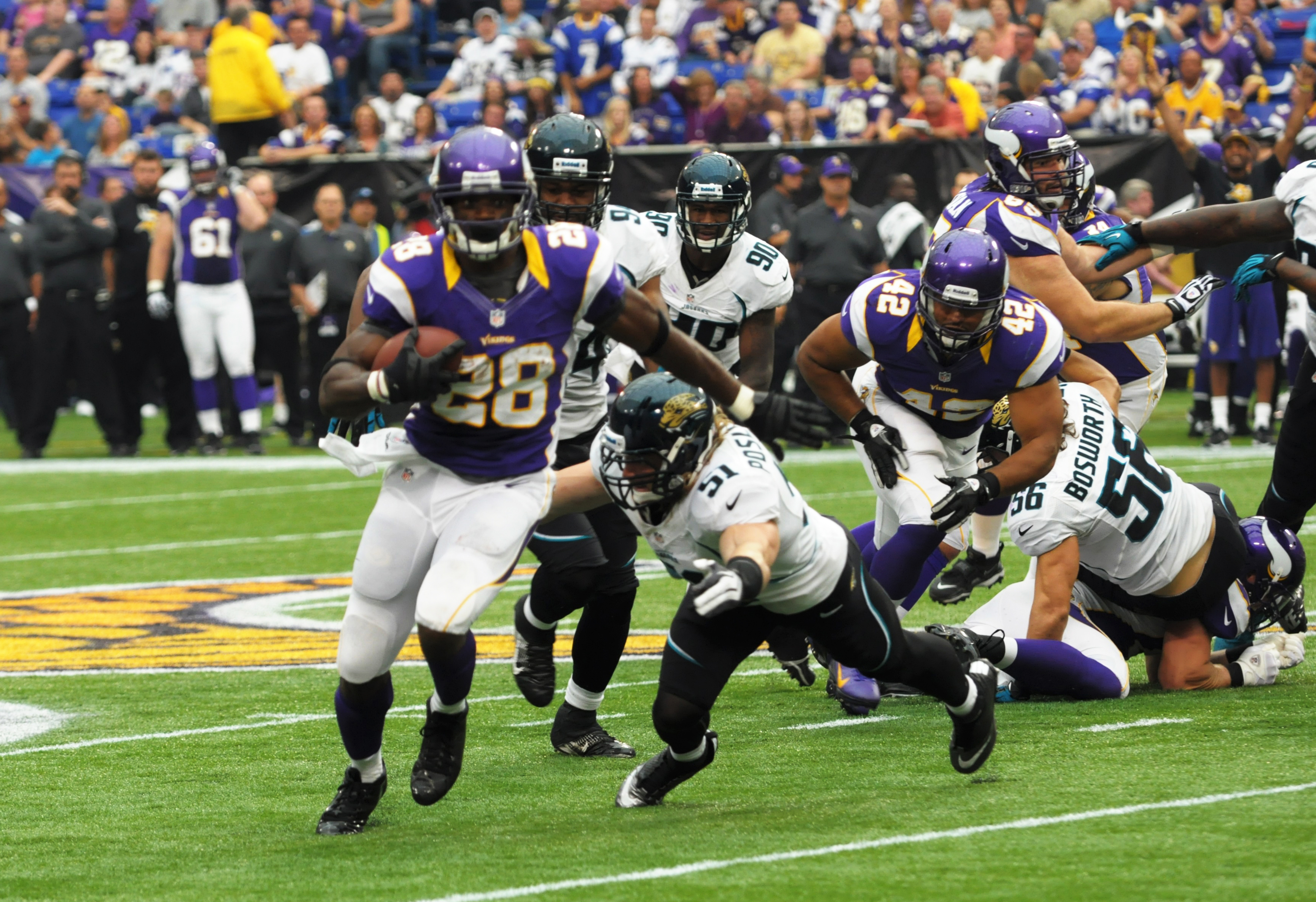
Jacksonville on the road at the Minnesota Vikings in week 1 of the season

- QB Luke McCown, declared free agent on March 13, 2012.
- DT Leger Douzable, declared free agent on March 13, 2012.
- WR Kassim Osgood, released on March 13, 2012.
- DE Matt Roth, declared free agent on March 13, 2012.
- RB Deji Karim, released on April 27, 2012.
- P Nick Harris, released on April 28, 2012.
- CB Drew Coleman, released on May 3, 2012.
- DE Aaron Kampman, released on June 7, 2012.
- CB Ashton Youboty, released on August 25, 2012.
- WR Chastin West, released on August 25, 2012.
- RB DuJuan Harris, released on August 25, 2012.
- S Courtney Greene, released on August 31, 2012.
- DB Rod Issac, released on August 31, 2012.

==== Trades ====
- Traded WR Mike Thomas to the Detroit Lions on October 30, 2012 for a 2014 fifth round draft pick.

=== NFL draft ===
2012 Jacksonville Jaguars draft
Round	Pick	Player	Position	College	Notes
1	5	Justin Blackmon	Wide receiver	Oklahoma State	
2	38	Andre Branch	Defensive end	Clemson	
3	70	Bryan Anger *	Punter	California	
5	142	Brandon Marshall	Linebacker	Nevada	
6	176	Mike Harris	Cornerback	Florida State	
7	228	Jeris Pendleton	Defensive tackle	Ashland	
Made roster † Pro Football Hall of Fame * Made at least one Pro Bowl during career

Notes
^{^[a]}The team traded a 1st round (7th overall) and 4th round draft selection (102nd overall) in exchange for the 1st round draft selection (5th overall) of the Buccaneers.
^{^[b]}The team traded a 7th round draft selection (214th overall) to the New York Jets in exchange for free safety Dwight Lowery.
^{^[c]}The team obtained a 7th round draft selection (228th overall) in a trade with Cincinnati Bengals.

==== Undrafted rookie free agents ====
The following is a list of notable rookie free agents signed after the 2012 NFL draft:

Player	Position	College	Status
Antwon Blake	Cornerback	UTEP	Made 53-man roster
Mike Brewster	Center	Ohio State	Made 53-man roster
Kevin Elliott	Wide receiver	Florida A&M	Made 53-man roster
Julian Stanford	Linebacker	Wagner	Made 53-man roster
Ryan Davis	Defensive end	Bethune-Cookman	Made practice squad^{[a]}
Drew Nowak	Guard	Western Michigan	Injured reserve
Matt Veldman	Tight end	North Dakota State	Injured reserve

Notes:

^{^[a]}Promoted to active roster on Oct. 5, 2012.

== Staff ==
2012 Jacksonville Jaguars staff
Front office: Owner – Shahid Khan; President – Mark Lamping; General manager – Gene Smith; Director of football administration – Tim Walsh; Director of player personnel – Terry McDonough; Director of pro personnel – Louis Clark; Director of college personnel – Andy Dengler; Assistant director of college personnel – Tim Mingey; Head coaches: Head coach – Mike Mularkey; Assistant head coach/quarterbacks – Greg Olson; Offensive coaches: Offensive coordinator – Bob Bratkowski; Running backs – Sylvester Croom; Wide receivers – Jerry Sullivan; Tight ends – Bobby Johnson; Offensive line – Andy Heck; Assistant offensive line – Ron Prince; Offensive assistant – Marlon McCree; Offensive assistant – Jake Peetz; Assistant to the head coach/offensive assistant – Charlie Skalaski	Defensive coaches: Assistant head coach/defensive coordinator – Mel Tucker; Defensive line – Joe Cullen; Assistant defensive line – Paul Spicer; Linebackers – Mark Duffner; Secondary – Tony Oden; Defensive assistant – Brandon Blaney; Special teams coaches: Special teams coordinator – John Bonamego; Assistant special teams – Craig Aukerman; Strength and conditioning: Strength and conditioning coordinator – Tom Myslinski; Assistant strength and conditioning – Josh Hingst; Assistant strength and conditioning – Cedric Scott; Strength assistant – Patrick Mularkey

== Final roster ==
2012 Jacksonville Jaguars roster
Quarterbacks (QB): 7 Chad Henne; 5 Jordan Palmer; Running backs (RB): 43 Jonathan Grimes; 33 Greg Jones FB; 39 Richard Murphy; 24 Montell Owens; 35 Keith Toston; Wide receivers (WR): 14 Justin Blackmon; 12 Mike Brown; 17 Toney Clemons; 18 Jerrell Jackson; 16 Jordan Shipley PR; 86 Isaiah Stanback; Tight ends (TE): 89 Marcedes Lewis; 88 Zach Potter; 87 Allen Reisner	Offensive linemen (OL): 72 Mark Asper G; 78 Cameron Bradfield T; 73 Eben Britton G/T; 63 Brad Meester C; 75 Eugene Monroe T; 77 Uche Nwaneri G; 67 Austin Pasztor G; 66 Steve Vallos C/G; 68 Guy Whimper T; Defensive linemen (DL): 93 Tyson Alualu DT; 58 Jason Babin DE; 97 John Chick DE; 96 Terrance Knighton DT; 92 Austen Lane DE; 70 Jerome Long DT; 94 Jeremy Mincey DE; 99 C. J. Mosley DT; 98 Jeris Pendleton DT; 91 George Selvie DE	Linebackers (LB): 50 Russell Allen OLB; 56 Kyle Bosworth OLB; 53 Brandon Marshall OLB; 51 Paul Posluszny MLB; 52 Daryl Smith OLB; 57 Julian Stanford OLB; Defensive backs (DB): 38 Antwon Blake SS; 21 Derek Cox CB; 20 Mike Harris CB; 26 Dawan Landry SS; 27 Rashean Mathis CB; 36 Antwaun Molden SS; 42 Chris Prosinski FS; 31 Aaron Ross CB; 22 Kevin Rutland CB; Special teams (ST): 19 Bryan Anger P; 48 Jeremy Cain LS; 10 Josh Scobee K	Practice squad: 59 Ryan Davis DE; 37 Antonio Dennard CB (IR); 61 Tommie Draheim C; 83 Brittan Golden WR; 40 Curtis Holcomb CB; 41 Brandon King CB; 79 Andrew Mitchell T; 45 Will Taʻufoʻou FB; 4 John Parker Wilson QB; Reserve: 44 Brock Bolen FB (IR); 47 Brett Brackett TE (IR); 90 Andre Branch DE (IR); 60 Mike Brewster G/C (IR); 62 John Estes G/C (IR); 11 Blaine Gabbert QB (IR); 23 Rashad Jennings RB (IR); 54 Greg Jones MLB (IR); 32 Maurice Jones-Drew RB (IR); 25 Dwight Lowery FS (IR); 29 William Middleton CB (IR); 64 Drew Nowak G (IR); 34 Jalen Parmele RB (IR); 15 Taylor Price WR (IR); 65 Will Rackley G (IR); 81 Laurent Robinson WR (IR); 84 Cecil Shorts WR (IR); 95 D'Anthony Smith DT (IR); 67 Jason Spitz G/C (IR); 30 Jordan Todman RB (IR); 85 Matt Veldman TE (IR); Rookies in italics 53 active, 22 reserve, 8 practice squad

== Preseason ==
Week	Date	Opponent	Result	Record	Venue	Recap
1	August 10	New York Giants	W 32–31	1–0	EverBank Field	Recap
2	August 17	at New Orleans Saints	W 27–24	2–0	Mercedes-Benz Superdome	Recap
3	August 23	at Baltimore Ravens	L 17–48	2–1	M&T Bank Stadium	Recap
4	August 30	Atlanta Falcons	W 24–14	3–1	EverBank Field	Recap

== Regular season ==
=== Schedule ===
Week	Date	Opponent	Result	Record	Venue	Recap
1	September 9	at Minnesota Vikings	**L** 23–26 (OT)	0–1	Mall of America Field	Recap
2	September 16	**Houston Texans**	**L** 7–27	0–2	EverBank Field	Recap
3	September 23	at **Indianapolis Colts**	**W** 22–17	1–2	Lucas Oil Stadium	Recap
4	September 30	Cincinnati Bengals	**L** 10–27	1–3	EverBank Field	Recap
5	October 7	Chicago Bears	**L** 3–41	1–4	EverBank Field	Recap
6	Bye					
7	October 21	at Oakland Raiders	**L** 23–26 (OT)	1–5	O.co Coliseum	Recap
8	October 28	at Green Bay Packers	**L** 15–24	1–6	Lambeau Field	Recap
9	November 4	Detroit Lions	**L** 14–31	1–7	EverBank Field	Recap
10	November 8	**Indianapolis Colts**	**L** 10–27	1–8	EverBank Field	Recap
11	November 18	at **Houston Texans**	**L** 37–43 (OT)	1–9	Reliant Stadium	Recap
12	November 25	**Tennessee Titans**	**W** 24–19	2–9	EverBank Field	Recap
13	December 2	at Buffalo Bills	**L** 18–34	2–10	Ralph Wilson Stadium	Recap
14	December 9	New York Jets	**L** 10–17	2–11	EverBank Field	Recap
15	December 16	at Miami Dolphins	**L** 3–24	2–12	Sun Life Stadium	Recap
16	December 23	New England Patriots	**L** 16–23	2–13	EverBank Field	Recap
17	December 30	at **Tennessee Titans**	**L** 20–38	2–14	LP Field	Recap

Note: Intra-division opponents are in bold text.

=== Game summaries ===
==== Week 1: at Minnesota Vikings ====
Week One: Jacksonville Jaguars at Minnesota Vikings – Game summary

Quarter	1	2	3	4	OT	Total
Jaguars	3	6	3	11	0	**23**
**Vikings**	0	7	7	9	3	**26**

at Mall of America Field at the Hubert H. Humphrey Metrodome, Minneapolis, Minnesota

- Date: September 9, 2012
- Game time: 12:00 p.m. CDT
- Game weather: None (indoor stadium)
- Game attendance: 56,607
- Referee: Robert Dalton
- TV announcers (CBS): Kevin Harlan and Solomon Wilcots
- Recap, Game Book

Game information

**First quarter**

- JAC – Josh Scobee 19-yard field goal, 2:52. Jaguars 3–0. **Drive: 17 plays, 77 yards, 9:22.**

**Second quarter**

- JAC – Marcedes Lewis 1-yard pass from Blaine Gabbert (kick blocked), 5:21. Jaguars 9–0. **Drive: 11 plays, 78 yards, 7:09.**
- MIN – Adrian Peterson 3-yard run (Blair Walsh kick), 0:41. Jaguars 9–7. **Drive: 7 plays, 59 yards, 1:47.**

**Third quarter**

- MIN – Adrian Peterson 2-yard run (Blair Walsh kick), 9:42. Vikings 14–9. **Drive: 4 plays, 44 yards, 1:54.**
- JAC – Josh Scobee 26-yard field goal, 4:40. Vikings 14–12. **Drive: 4 plays, 8 yards, 1:25.**

**Fourth quarter**

- MIN – Blair Walsh 20-yard field goal, 14:09. Vikings 17–12. **Drive: 11 plays, 75 yards, 5:31.**
- JAC – Josh Scobee 47-yard field goal, 9:35. Vikings 17–15. **Drive: 10 plays, 51 yards, 4:34.**
- MIN – Blair Walsh 42-yard field goal, 5:33. Vikings 20–15. **Drive: 9 plays, 57 yards, 4:02.**
- JAC – Cecil Shorts 39-yard pass from Blaine Gabbert (pass succeeded), 0:20. Jaguars 23–20. **Drive: 6 plays, 76 yards, 0:58.**
- MIN – Blair Walsh 55-yard field goal, 0:00. Tied 23–23. **Drive: 3 plays, 32 yards, 0:20.**

**Overtime**

- MIN – Blair Walsh 38-yard field goal, 11:06. Vikings 26–23. **Drive: 8 plays, 55 yards, 3:54.**

**Top passers**

- JAC – Blaine Gabbert – 23/39, 260 yards, 2 TD
- MIN – Christian Ponder – 20/27, 270 yards

**Top rushers**

- JAC – Maurice Jones-Drew – 19 rushes, 77 yards
- MIN – Adrian Peterson – 17 rushes, 84 yards, 2 TD

**Top receivers**

- JAC – Laurent Robinson – 5 receptions, 66 yards
- MIN – Percy Harvin – 6 receptions, 84 yards

**Top tacklers**

- JAC – Dawan Landry – 6 tackles, 2 assists
- MIN – Chad Greenway – 9 tackles, 4 assists, 2 passes defended

==== Week 2: vs. Houston Texans ====
Week Two: Houston Texans at Jacksonville Jaguars – Game summary

Quarter	1	2	3	4	Total
**Texans**	10	7	7	3	**27**
Jaguars	0	0	7	0	**7**

at EverBank Field, Jacksonville, Florida

- Date: September 16, 2012
- Game time: 1:00 p.m. EDT
- Game weather: 83 °F (28 °C)
- Game attendance: 62,907
- Referee: David White
- TV announcers (CBS): Marv Albert and Rich Gannon
- Recap, Game Book

Game information

**First quarter**

- HOU – Shayne Graham 31-yard field goal, 9:25. Texans 3–0. **Drive: 13 plays, 66 yards, 5:35.**
- HOU – Arian Foster 1-yard run (Shayne Graham kick), 0:15. Texans 10–0. **Drive: 6 plays, 41 yards, 2:37.**

**Second quarter**

- HOU – Ben Tate 8-yard run (Shayne Graham kick), 6:49. Texans 17–0. **Drive: 7 plays, 58 yards, 3:34.**

**Third quarter**

- JAC – Maurice Jones-Drew 5-yard pass from Blaine Gabbert (Josh Scobee kick), 11:44. Texans 17–7. **Drive: 2 plays, 37 yards, 0:51.**
- HOU – Ben Tate 2-yard run (Shayne Graham kick), 2:30. Texans 24–7. **Drive: 17 plays, 80 yards, 9:14.**

**Fourth quarter**

- HOU – Shayne Graham 37-yard field goal, 7:20. Texans 27–7. **Drive: 10 plays, 73 yards, 6:15.**

**Top passers**

- HOU – Matt Schaub – 26/35, 195 yards
- JAC – Blaine Gabbert – 7/19, 53 yards, TD

**Top rushers**

- HOU – Arian Foster – 28 rushes, 110 yards, TD
- JAC – Maurice Jones-Drew – 12 rushes, 60 yards

**Top receivers**

- HOU – Owen Daniels – 6 receptions, 47 yards
- JAC – Laurent Robinson – 3 receptions, 49 yards

**Top tacklers**

- HOU – J. J. Watt – 4 tackles, 1 assists, 1.5 sacks, 2 passes defended
- JAC – Russell Allen – 12 tackles, 1 assists

==== Week 3: at Indianapolis Colts ====
Week Three: Jacksonville Jaguars at Indianapolis Colts – Game summary

Quarter	1	2	3	4	Total
**Jaguars**	3	0	10	9	**22**
Colts	7	7	0	3	**17**

at Lucas Oil Stadium, Indianapolis, Indiana

- Date: September 23, 2012
- Game time: 1:00 p.m. EDT
- Game weather: Partly cloudy, 59 °F (15 °C)
- Game attendance: 63,536
- Referee: Donovan Briggans
- TV announcers (CBS): Bill Macatee and Steve Tasker
- Recap, Game Book

Game information

**First quarter**

- JAC – Josh Scobee 44-yard field goal, 7:13. Jaguars 3–0. **Drive: 14 plays, 54 yards, 7:47.**
- IND – T. Y. Hilton 40-yard pass from Andrew Luck (Adam Vinatieri kick), 3:42. Colts 7–3. **Drive: 6 plays, 74 yards, 3:31.**

**Second quarter**

- IND – Mewelde Moore 4-yard pass from Andrew Luck (Adam Vinatieri kick), 0:37. Colts 14–3. **Drive: 14 plays, 80 yards, 4:53.**

**Third quarter**

- JAC – Maurice Jones-Drew 59-yard run (Josh Scobee kick), 12:05. Colts 14–10. **Drive: 1 plays, 59 yards, 0:11.**
- JAC – Josh Scobee 47-yard field goal, 2:55. Colts 14–13. **Drive: 7 plays, 16 yards, 3:23.**

**Fourth quarter**

- JAC – Josh Scobee 26-yard field goal, 11:02. Jaguars 16–14. **Drive: 11 plays, 77 yards, 5:25.**
- IND – Adam Vinatieri 37-yard field goal, 0:56. Colts 17–16. **Drive: 5 plays, 48 yards, 0:37.**
- JAC – Cecil Shorts 80-yard pass from Blaine Gabbert (run failed), 0:45. Jaguars 22–17. **Drive: 1 play, 80 yards, 0:11.**

**Top passers**

- JAC – Blaine Gabbert – 10/21, 155 yards, TD
- IND – Andrew Luck – 22/46, 313 yards, 2 TD, INT

**Top rushers**

- JAC – Maurice Jones-Drew – 28 rushes, 177 yards, TD
- IND – Donald Brown – 18 rushes, 62 yards

**Top receivers**

- JAC – Cecil Shorts – 1 reception, 80 yards, TD
- IND – T. Y. Hilton – 4 receptions, 113 yards, TD

**Top tacklers**

- JAC – Russell Allen – 9 tackles, 2 assists, 1 pass defended
- IND – Jerrell Freeman – 7 tackles, 2 assists

==== Week 4: vs. Cincinnati Bengals ====
Week Four: Cincinnati Bengals at Jacksonville Jaguars – Game summary

Quarter	1	2	3	4	Total
**Bengals**	3	14	0	10	**27**
Jaguars	0	7	3	0	**10**

at EverBank Field, Jacksonville, Florida

- Date: September 30, 2012
- Game time: 4:05 p.m. EDT
- Game weather: 86 °F (30 °C)
- Game attendance: 63,030
- Referee: Ed Hochuli
- TV announcers (CBS): Marv Albert and Rich Gannon
- Recap, Game Book

Game information

**First quarter**

- CIN – Mike Nugent 35-yard field goal, 6:10. Bengals 3–0. **Drive: 14 plays, 74 yards, 6:11.**

**Second quarter**

- JAC – Marcedes Lewis 2-yard pass from Blaine Gabbert (Josh Scobee kick), 13:33. Jaguars 7–3. **Drive: 13 plays, 77 yards, 7:37.**
- CIN – Chris Pressley 1-yard pass from Andy Dalton (Mike Nugent kick), 6:16. Bengals 10–7. **Drive: 8 plays, 75 yards, 3:43.**
- CIN – Andy Dalton 1-yard run (Mike Nugent kick), 1:11. Bengals 17–7. **Drive: 6 plays, 69 yards, 2:06.**

**Third quarter**

- JAC – Josh Scobee 21-yard field goal, 3:04. Bengals 17–10. **Drive: 14 plays, 77 yards, 7:55.**

**Fourth quarter**

- CIN – A. J. Green 18-yard pass from Andy Dalton (Mike Nugent kick), 13:51. Bengals 24–10. **Drive: 8 plays, 80 yards, 4:13.**
- CIN – Mike Nugent 35-yard field goal, 12:38. Bengals 27–10. **Drive: 4 plays, 0 yards, 1:01.**

**Top passers**

- CIN – Andy Dalton – 20/31, 244 yards, 2 TD, INT
- JAC – Blaine Gabbert – 23/34, 186 yards, TD, INT

**Top rushers**

- CIN – BenJarvus Green-Ellis – 26 rushes, 82 yards
- JAC – Maurice Jones-Drew – 13 rushes, 38 yards

**Top receivers**

- CIN – A. J. Green – 6 receptions, 117 yards, TD
- JAC – Justin Blackmon – 6 receptions, 48 yards

**Top tacklers**

- CIN – Vontaze Burfict – 8 tackles, 1 sack, 1 pass defended
- JAC – Russell Allen – 8 tackles, 3 assists

==== Week 5: vs. Chicago Bears ====
Week Five: Chicago Bears at Jacksonville Jaguars – Game summary

Quarter	1	2	3	4	Total
**Bears**	3	0	10	28	**41**
Jaguars	0	3	0	0	**3**

at EverBank Field, Jacksonville, Florida

- Date: October 7, 2012
- Game time: 4:05 p.m. EDT
- Game weather: 88 °F (31 °C), cloudy
- Game attendance: 67,012
- Referee: Ron Winter
- TV announcers (Fox): Kenny Albert, Daryl Johnston, and Tony Siragusa
- Recap, Game Book

Game information

**First quarter**

- CHI – Robbie Gould 32-yard field goal, 4:23. Bears 3–0. **Drive: 12 plays, 77 yards, 6:11.**

**Second quarter**

- JAC – Josh Scobee 31-yard field goal, 14:02. Tied 3–3. **Drive: 14 plays, 61 yards, 5:21.**

**Third quarter**

- CHI – Robbie Gould 31-yard field goal, 5:42. Bears 6–3. **Drive: 17 plays, 76 yards, 9:18.**
- CHI – Charles Tillman 36-yard interception return (Robbie Gould kick), 5:04. Bears 13–3.

**Fourth quarter**

- CHI – Alshon Jeffery 10-yard pass from Jay Cutler (Robbie Gould kick), 14:55. Bears 20–3. **Drive: 9 plays, 67 yards, 3:36.**
- CHI – Brandon Marshall 10-yard pass from Jay Cutler (Robbie Gould kick), 8:37. Bears 27–3. **Drive: 7 plays, 94 yards, 4:03.**
- CHI – Lance Briggs 36-yard interception return (Robbie Gould kick), 7:54. Bears 34–3.
- CHI – Armando Allen 46-yard run (Robbie Gould kick), 1:49. Bears 41–3. **Drive: 8 plays, 73 yards, 4:42.**

**Top passers**

- CHI – Jay Cutler – 23/39, 292 yards, 2 TD, INT
- JAC – Blaine Gabbert – 17/33, 142 yards, 2 INT

**Top rushers**

- CHI – Matt Forte – 22 rushes, 107 yards
- JAC – BenJarvus Green-Ellis – 12 rushes, 56 yards

**Top receivers**

- CHI – Brandon Marshall – 12 receptions, 144 yards, TD
- JAC – Cecil Shorts – 2 receptions, 43 yards

**Top tacklers**

- CHI – Tim Jennings – 6 tackles, 1 pass defended
- JAC – Paul Posluszny – 8 tackles, 1 assist

==== Week 7: at Oakland Raiders ====
Week Seven: Jacksonville Jaguars at Oakland Raiders – Game summary

Quarter	1	2	3	4	OT	Total
Jaguars	7	10	3	3	0	**23**
**Raiders**	3	3	7	10	3	**26**

at O.co Coliseum, Oakland, California

- Date: October 21, 2012
- Game time: 1:25 p.m. PDT
- Game weather: Partly cloudy, 62 °F (17 °C)
- Game attendance: 51,634
- Referee: Scott Green
- TV announcers (CBS): Ian Eagle and Dan Fouts
- Recap, Game Book

Game information

**First quarter**

- OAK – Sebastian Janikowski 21-yard field goal, 6:13. Raiders 3–0. **Drive: 7 plays, 69 yards, 2:44.**
- JAC – Cecil Shorts 42-yard pass from Blaine Gabbert (Josh Scobee kick), 3:24. Jaguars 7–3. **Drive: 6 plays, 80 yards, 2:49.**

**Second quarter**

- JAC – Rashad Jennings 5-yard run (Josh Scobee kick), 11:34. Jaguars 14–3. **Drive: 3 plays, 16 yards, 0:46.**
- JAC – Josh Scobee 50-yard field goal, 5:57. Jaguars 17–3. **Drive: 4 plays, 4 yards, 0:55.**
- OAK – Sebastian Janikowski 33-yard field goal, 0:34. Jaguars 17–6. **Drive: 11 plays, 39 yards, 3:55.**

**Third quarter**

- JAC – Josh Scobee 40-yard field goal, 10:42. Jaguars 20–6. **Drive: 6 plays, 17 yards, 2:49.**
- OAK – Denarius Moore 8-yard pass from Carson Palmer (Sebastian Janikowski kick), 6:01. Jaguars 20–13. **Drive: 9 plays, 85 yards, 4:41.**

**Fourth quarter**

- JAC – Josh Scobee 45-yard field goal, 12:40. Jaguars 23–13. **Drive: 4 plays, −3 yards, 2:03.**
- OAK – Sebastian Janikowski 31-yard field goal, 6:52. Jaguars 23–16. **Drive: 12 plays, 79 yards, 5:48.**
- OAK – Carson Palmer 1-yard run (Sebastian Janikowski kick), 3:34. Tied 23–23. **Drive: 10 plays, 58 yards, 2:57.**

**Overtime**

- OAK – Sebastian Janikowski 40-yard field goal, 12:54. Raiders 26–23. **Drive: 2 plays, −1 yard, 0:37.**

**Top passers**

- JAC – Blaine Gabbert – 8/12, 110 yards, TD
- OAK – Carson Palmer – 26/46, 298 yards, TD, INT

**Top rushers**

- JAC – Rashad Jennings – 21 rushes, 44 yards, TD
- OAK – Darren McFadden – 19 rushes, 53 yards

**Top receivers**

- JAC – Cecil Shorts – 4 receptions, 79 yards, TD
- OAK – Darrius Heyward-Bey – 4 receptions, 85 yards

**Top tacklers**

- JAC – Paul Posluszny – 7 tackles, 1 assist, 2 passes defended
- OAK – Lamarr Houston – 5 tackles, 3 assists, 1 sack, 1 forced fumble

==== Week 8: at Green Bay Packers ====
Week Eight: Jacksonville Jaguars at Green Bay Packers – Game summary

Quarter	1	2	3	4	Total
Jaguars	3	9	0	3	**15**
**Packers**	7	7	0	10	**24**

at Lambeau Field, Green Bay, Wisconsin

- Date: October 28, 2012
- Game time: 12:00 p.m. CDT
- Game weather: Sunny, 44 °F (7 °C)
- Game attendance: 70,464
- Referee: Carl Cheffers
- TV announcers (CBS): Greg Gumbel and Dan Dierdorf
- Recap, Game Book

Game information

**First quarter**

- JAC – Josh Scobee 38-yard field goal, Jaguars 3–0. **Drive: 7 plays, 46 yards, 3:36.**
- GB – Randall Cobb 5-yard pass from Aaron Rodgers (Mason Crosby kick), Packers 7–3. **Drive: 6 plays, 69 yards, 5:29.**

**Second quarter**

- GB – Dezman Moses blocked punt recovery in end zone (Mason Crosby kick), Packers 14–3.
- JAC – Josh Scobee 22-yard field goal, Packers 14–6. **Drive: 7 plays, 65 yards, 1:32.**
- JAC – Guy Whimper 1-yard pass from Blaine Gabbert (Pass failed), Packers 14–12. **Drive: 5 plays, 13 yards, 0:35.**

**Third quarter**

- No scoring plays.

**Fourth quarter**

- GB – Donald Driver 4-yard pass from Aaron Rodgers (Mason Crosby kick), Packers 21–12. **Drive: 7 plays, 52 yards, 2:42.**
- JAC – Josh Scobee 32-yard field goal, Packers 21–15. **Drive: 11 plays, 66 yards, 5:46.**
- GB – Mason Crosby 25-yard field goal, Packers 24–15. **Drive: 6 plays, 49 yards, 2:27.**

**Top passers**

- JAC – Blaine Gabbert – 27/49, 303 yards, TD
- GB – Aaron Rodgers – 22/35, 186 yards, 2 TD

**Top rushers**

- JAC – Rashad Jennings – 17 rushes, 59 yards
- GB – Alex Green – 22 rushes, 54 yards

**Top receivers**

- JAC – Cecil Shorts – 8 receptions, 116 yards
- GB – James Jones – 7 receptions, 78 yards

**Top tacklers**

- JAC – Russell Allen – 6 tackles, 1 assist, 1 pass defended
- GB – Morgan Burnett – 9 tackles, 2 assists, 1 sack, 1 forced fumble

==== Week 9: vs. Detroit Lions ====
Week Nine: Detroit Lions at Jacksonville Jaguars – Game summary

Quarter	1	2	3	4	Total
**Lions**	0	21	0	10	**31**
Jaguars	0	0	0	14	**14**

at EverBank Field, Jacksonville, Florida

- Date: November 4, 2012
- Game time: 1:00 p.m. EST
- Game weather: Sunny, 81 °F (27 °C)
- Game attendance: 63,050
- Referee: Gene Steratore
- TV announcers (Fox): Ron Pitts, Mike Martz, and Kristina Pink
- Recap, Game Book

Game information

**First quarter**

- No scoring plays

**Second quarter**

- DET – Mikel Leshoure 7-yard run (Jason Hanson kick), 12:16. Lions 7–0. **Drive: 13 plays, 91 yards, 5:50.**
- DET – Mikel Leshoure 1-yard run (Jason Hanson kick), 7:58. Lions 14–0. **Drive: 7 plays, 53 yards, 3:21.**
- DET – Mikel Leshoure 8-yard run (Jason Hanson kick), 0:29. Lions 21–0. **Drive: 10 plays, 81 yards, 4:11.**

**Third quarter**

- No scoring plays.

**Fourth quarter**

- DET – Jason Hanson 42-yard field goal, 13:56. Lions 24–0. **Drive: 7 plays, 40 yards, 3:01.**
- JAC – Micheal Spurlock 5-yard pass from Blaine Gabbert (pass succeeded), 8:36. Lions 24–8. **Drive: 11 plays, 80 yards, 5:20.**
- DET – Joique Bell 10-yard run (Jason Hanson kick), 2:42. Lions 31–8. **Drive: 9 plays, 80 yards, 5:54.**
- JAC – Justin Blackmon 6-yard pass from Blaine Gabbert (pass failed), 0:50. Lions 31–14. **Drive: 12 plays, 72 yards, 1:52.**

**Top passers**

- DET – Matthew Stafford – 22/33, 285 yards
- JAC – Blaine Gabbert – 27/38, 220 yards, 2 TD, 2 INT

**Top rushers**

- DET – Joique Bell – 13 rushes, 73 yards, TD
- JAC – Rashad Jennings – 12 rushes, 45 yards

**Top receivers**

- DET – Calvin Johnson – 7 receptions, 129 yards
- JAC – Cecil Shorts – 3 receptions, 56 yards

**Top tacklers**

- DET – Justin Durant – 7 tackles
- JAC – Paul Posluszny – 7 tackles, 1 assist

==== Week 10: vs. Indianapolis Colts ====
Week Ten: Indianapolis Colts at Jacksonville Jaguars – Game summary

Quarter	1	2	3	4	Total
**Colts**	3	14	7	3	**27**
Jaguars	0	3	0	7	**10**

at EverBank Field, Jacksonville, Florida

- Date: November 8, 2012
- Game time: 8:20 p.m. EST
- Game weather: 50 °F (10 °C)
- Game attendance: 63,272
- Referee: Terry McAulay
- TV announcers (NFLN): Brad Nessler, Mike Mayock, and Alex Flanagan
- Recap, Game Book

Game information

**First quarter**

- IND – Adam Vinatieri 31-yard field goal, 7:27. Colts 3–0. **Drive: 7 plays, 44 yards, 3:31.**

**Second quarter**

- IND – Andrew Luck 5-yard run (Adam Vinatieri kick), 13:44. Colts 10–0. **Drive: 8 plays, 66 yards, 4:30.**
- IND – Andrew Luck 1-yard run (Adam Vinatieri kick), 7:39. Colts 17–0. **Drive: 7 plays, 61 yards, 3:43.**
- JAC – Josh Scobee 40-yard field goal, 0:17. Colts 17–3. **Drive: 9 plays, 47 yards, 1:31.**

**Third quarter**

- IND – Darius Butler 11-yard interception return (Adam Vinatieri kick), 10:50. Colts 24–3.

**Fourth quarter**

- JAC – Cecil Shorts 4-yard pass from Chad Henne (Josh Scobee kick), 9:16. Colts 24–10. **Drive: 14 plays, 81 yards, 5:36.**
- IND – Adam Vinatieri 41-yard field goal, 3:23. Colts 27–10. **Drive: 9 plays, 57 yards, 5:53.**

**Top passers**

- IND – Andrew Luck – 18/26, 227 yards, INT
- JAC – Blaine Gabbert – 18/31, 209 yards, INT

**Top rushers**

- IND – Vick Ballard – 12 rushes, 48 yards
- JAC – Rashad Jennings – 11 rushes, 27 yards

**Top receivers**

- IND – Reggie Wayne – 8 receptions, 96 yards
- JAC – Cecil Shorts – 6 receptions, 105 yards, TD

**Top tacklers**

- IND – Antoine Bethea – 7 tackles, 1 sack
- JAC – Dawan Landry – 8 tackles, INT

==== Week 11: at Houston Texans ====
Week Eleven: Jacksonville Jaguars at Houston Texans – Game summary

Quarter	1	2	3	4	OT	Total
Jaguars	7	10	10	7	3	**37**
**Texans**	7	10	3	14	9	**43**

at Reliant Stadium, Houston, Texas

- Date: November 18, 2012
- Game time: 12:00 p.m. CST
- Game weather: Played indoors (retractable roof closed)
- Game attendance: 71,676
- Referee: Clete Blakeman
- TV announcers (CBS): Bill Macatee and Steve Tasker
- Recap, Game Book

Game information

**First quarter**

- HOU – Keshawn Martin 9-yard pass from Matt Schaub (Shayne Graham kick), 12:15. Texans 7–0. **Drive: 5 plays, 83 yards, 2:45.**
- JAC – Marcedes Lewis 13-yard TD pass from Chad Henne (Josh Scobee kick), 2:56. Tied 7–7. **Drive: 4 plays, 81 yards, 1:32.**

**Second quarter**

- JAC – Cecil Shorts 67-yard pass from Chad Henne (Josh Scobee kick), 12:31. Jaguars 14–7. **Drive: 4 plays, 81 yards, 2:16.**
- HOU – James Casey 1-yard pass from Matt Schaub (Shayne Graham kick), 7:52. Tied 14–14. **Drive: 8 plays, 48 yards, 4:39.**
- JAC – Josh Scobee 43-yard field goal, 2:53. Jaguars 17–14. **Drive: 8 plays, 44 yards, 4:59.**
- HOU – Shayne Graham 42-yard field goal, 1:12. Tied 17–17. **Drive: 3 plays, 7 yards, 1:41.**

**Third quarter**

- JAC – Josh Scobee 40-yard field goal, 11:01. Jaguars 20–17. **Drive: 8 plays, 58 yards, 3:59.**
- JAC – Marcedes Lewis 1-yard pass from Chad Henne (Josh Scobee kick), 6:52. Jaguars 27–17. **Drive: 5 plays, 11 yards, 2:39.**
- HOU – Shayne Graham 27-yard field goal, 2:15. Jaguars 27–20. **Drive: 9 plays, 65 yards, 4:37.**

**Fourth quarter**

- JAC – Justin Blackmon 81-yard pass from Chad Henne (Josh Scobee kick), 12:33. Jaguars 34–20. **Drive: 3 plays, 70 yards, 1:23.**
- HOU – Garrett Graham 1-yard pass from Matt Schaub (Shayne Graham kick), 5:39. Jaguars 34–27. **Drive: 14 plays, 61 yards, 6:54.**
- HOU – Garrett Graham 5-yard pass from Matt Schaub (Shayne Graham kick), 1:34. Tied 34–34. **Drive: 8 plays, 89 yards, 2:18.**

**Overtime**

- HOU – Shayne Graham 25-yard field goal, 8:10. Texans 37–34. **Drive: 14 plays, 73 yards, 6:50.**
- JAC – Josh Scobee 33-yard field goal, 4:21. Tied 37–37. **Drive: 11 plays, 53 yards, 3:49.**
- HOU – Andre Johnson 48-yard pass from Matt Schaub, 2:01. Texans 43–37. **Drive: 2 plays, 53 yards, 0:20.**

**Top passers**

- JAC – Chad Henne – 16/33, 354 yards, 4 TD
- HOU – Matt Schaub – 43/55, 527 yards, 5 TD, 2 INT

**Top rushers**

- JAC – Jalen Parmele – 24 rushes, 80 yards
- HOU – Arian Foster – 28 rushes, 77 yards

**Top receivers**

- JAC – Justin Blackmon – 7 receptions, 236 yards, TD
- HOU – Andre Johnson – 14 receptions, 273 yards, TD

**Top tacklers**

- JAC – Derek Cox – 16 tackles, 2 passes defended, INT
- HOU – Bradie James – 8 tackles, 1 assist

==== Week 12: vs. Tennessee Titans ====
Week Twelve: Tennessee Titans at Jacksonville Jaguars – Game summary

Quarter	1	2	3	4	Total
Titans	3	3	3	10	**19**
**Jaguars**	7	0	7	10	**24**

at EverBank Field, Jacksonville, Florida

- Date: November 25, 2012
- Game time: 1:00 p.m. EST
- Game weather: 60 °F (16 °C)
- Game attendance: 63,323
- Referee: Walt Anderson
- TV announcers (CBS): Spero Dedes and Steve Beuerlein
- Recap, Game Book

Game information

**First quarter**

- TEN – Rob Bironas 38-yard field goal, 13:32. Titans 3–0. **Drive: 4 plays, 8 yards, 1:23.**
- JAC – Rashad Jennings 1-yard run (Josh Scobee kick), 0:12. Jaguars 7–3. **Drive: 12 plays, 75 yards, 7:19.**

**Second quarter**

- TEN – Rob Bironas 40-yard field goal, 0:11. Jaguars 7–6. **Drive: 6 plays, 33 yards, 0:36.**

**Third quarter**

- JAC – Cecil Shorts 59-yard pass from Chad Henne (Josh Scobee kick), 8:40. Jaguars 14–6. **Drive: 6 plays, 75 yards, 2:59.**
- TEN – Rob Bironas 39-yard field goal, 3:26. Jaguars 14–9. **Drive: 12 plays, 64 yards, 5:14.**

**Fourth quarter**

- TEN – Rob Bironas 33-yard field goal, 10:05. Jaguars 14–12. **Drive: 10 plays, 72 yards, 2:51.**
- JAC – Justin Blackmon 7-yard pass from Chad Henne (Josh Scobee kick), 6:50. Jaguars 21–12. **Drive: 8 plays, 80 yards, 3:15.**
- TEN – Kenny Britt 6-yard pass from Jake Locker (Rob Bironas kick), 4:52. Jaguars 21–19. **Drive: 6 plays, 78 yards, 1:58.**
- JAC – Josh Scobee 41-yard field goal, 0:24. Jaguars 24–19. **Drive: 6 plays, 31 yards, 2:16.**

**Top passers**

- TEN – Jake Locker – 23/40, 261 yards, TD, 2 INT
- JAC – Chad Henne – 17/26, 261 yards, 2 TD, INT

**Top rushers**

- TEN – Chris Johnson – 21 rushes, 80 yards
- JAC – Jalen Parmele – 8 rushes, 45 yards

**Top receivers**

- TEN – Nate Washington – 4 receptions, 54 yards
- JAC – Calvin Johnson – 4 receptions, 105 yards, TD

**Top tacklers**

- TEN – Zach Brown – 8 tackles, 2 assists, 1.5 sacks
- JAC – Dawan Landry – 8 tackles

==== Week 13: at Buffalo Bills ====
Week Thirteen: Jacksonville Jaguars at Buffalo Bills – Game summary

Quarter	1	2	3	4	Total
Jaguars	0	10	0	8	**18**
**Bills**	7	10	10	7	**34**

at Ralph Wilson Stadium, Orchard Park, New York

- Date: December 2, 2012
- Game time: 1:00 p.m. EST
- Game weather: Rain, 52 °F (11 °C)
- Game attendance: 53,971
- Referee: Pete Morelli
- TV announcers (CBS): Spero Dedes and Steve Beuerlein
- Recap, Game Book

Game information

**First quarter**

- BUF – Ryan Fitzpatrick 1-yard run (Rian Lindell kick), 9:10. Bills 3–0. **Drive: 9 plays, 66 yards, 4:45.**

**Second quarter**

- JAC – Josh Scobee 36-yard field goal, 11:47. Bills 7–3. **Drive: 7 plays, 14 yards, 1:53.**
- JAC – Chad Henne 1-yard run (Josh Scobee kick), 3:47. Jaguars 10–7. **Drive: 4 plays, 63 yards, 1:46.**
- BUF – Scott Chandler 11-yard pass from Ryan Fitzpatrick (Rian Lindell kick), 1:56. Bills 14–10. **Drive: 4 plays, 26 yards, 1:51.**
- BUF – Rian Lindell 29-yard field goal, 0:31. Bills 17–10. **Drive: 4 plays, 3 yards, 1:20.**

**Third quarter**

- BUF – Stevie Johnson 13-yard pass from Ryan Fitzpatrick (Rian Lindell kick), 11:06. Bills 24–10. **Drive: 8 plays, 61 yards, 3:54.**
- BUF – Rian Lindell 50-yard field goal, 2:14. Bills 27–10. **Drive: 8 plays, 29 yards, 4:52.**

**Fourth quarter**

- BUF – C. J. Spiller 44-yard run (Rian Lindell kick), 13:29. Bills 34–10. **Drive: 4 plays, 62 yards, 2:07.**
- JAC – Cecil Shorts 5-yard pass from Chad Henne (run succeeded), 10:47. Bills 34–18. **Drive: 1 play, 5 yards, 0:04.**

**Top passers**

- JAC – Chad Henne – 19/42, 202 yards, TD, INT
- BUF – Ryan Fitzpatrick – 9/17, 112 yards, 2 TD, INT

**Top rushers**

- JAC – Montell Owens – 7 rushes, 29 yards
- BUF – Fred Jackson – 25 rushes, 109 yards

**Top receivers**

- JAC – Cecil Shorts – 7 receptions, 77 yards, TD
- BUF – T. J. Graham – 2 receptions, 54 yards

**Top tacklers**

- JAC – Paul Posluszny – 2 tackles, 7 assists, 1 pass defended, INT
- BUF – Ron Brooks – 8 tackles, 1 assist, 3 passes defended

==== Week 14: vs. New York Jets ====
Week Fourteen: New York Jets at Jacksonville Jaguars – Game summary

Quarter	1	2	3	4	Total
**Jets**	0	0	10	7	**17**
Jaguars	0	3	0	7	**10**

at EverBank Field, Jacksonville, Florida

- Date: December 9, 2012
- Game time: 1:00 p.m. EST
- Game weather: 67 °F (19 °C)
- Game attendance: 67,027
- Referee: Alberto Riveron
- TV announcers (CBS): Kevin Harlan and Solomon Wilcots
- Recap, Game Book

Game information

**First quarter**

- No scoring plays.

**Second quarter**

- JAC – Josh Scobee 31-yard field goal, 6:44. Jaguars 3–0. **Drive: 7 plays, 44 yards, 3:58.**

**Third quarter**

- NYJ – Shonn Greene 1-yard run (Nick Folk kick), 2:53. Jets 7–3. **Drive: 9 plays, 57 yards, 4:45.**
- NYJ – Nick Folk 44-yard field goal, 2:53. Jets 10–3. **Drive: 6 plays, 21 yards, 2:05.**

**Fourth quarter**

- NYJ – Bilal Powell 4-yard run (Nick Folk kick), 12:20. Jets 17–3. **Drive: 7 plays, 46 yards, 3:59.**
- JAC – Montell Owens 32-yard run (Josh Scobee kick), 7:06. Jets 17–10. **Drive: 11 plays, 86 yards, 5:14.**

**Top passers**

- NYJ – Mark Sanchez – 12/19, 111 yards
- JAC – Chad Henne – 21/43, 185 yards, 2 INT

**Top rushers**

- NYJ – Montell Owens – 14 rushes, 91 yards, TD
- JAC – Bilal Powell – 19 rushes, 78 yards, TD

**Top receivers**

- NYJ – Jeff Cumberland – 1 reception, 37 yards
- JAC – Justin Blackmon – 6 receptions, 57 yards

**Top tacklers**

- NYJ – LaRon Landry – 9 tackles, 1 assist
- JAC – Paul Posluszny – 10 tackles, 1 assist

==== Week 15: at Miami Dolphins ====
Week Fifteen: Jacksonville Jaguars at Miami Dolphins – Game summary

Quarter	1	2	3	4	Total
Jaguars	3	0	0	0	**3**
**Dolphins**	3	7	6	8	**24**

at Sun Life Stadium, Miami Gardens, Florida

- Date: December 16, 2012
- Game time: 1:00 p.m. EST
- Game weather: Cloudy, 80 °F (27 °C)
- Game attendance: 53,667
- Referee: John Parry
- TV announcers (CBS): Marv Albert and Rich Gannon
- Recap, Game Book

Game information

**First quarter**

- JAC – Josh Scobee 37-yard field goal, 10:03. Jaguars 3–0. **Drive: 10 plays, 61 yards, 4:57.**
- MIA – Dan Carpenter 53-yard field goal, 6:26. Tied 3–3. **Drive: 7 plays, 43 yards, 3:37.**

**Second quarter**

- MIA – Jorvorskie Lane 4-yard pass from Ryan Tannehill (Dan Carpenter kick), 1:56. Dolphins 10–3. **Drive: 14 plays, 89 yards, 7:34.**

**Third quarter**

- MIA – Dan Carpenter 30-yard field goal, 5:35. Dolphins 13–3. **Drive: 5 plays, 60 yards, 2:54.**
- MIA – Dan Carpenter 31-yard field goal, 1:01. Dolphins 16–3. **Drive: 7 plays, 64 yards, 3:00.**

**Fourth quarter**

- MIA – Anthony Fasano 2-yard pass from Ryan Tannehill (pass succeeded), 3:12. Dolphins 24–3. **Drive: 14 plays, 85 yards, 9:01.**

**Top passers**

- JAC – Chad Henne – 18/34, 221 yards
- MIA – Ryan Tannehill – 22/28, 220 yards, 2 TD

**Top rushers**

- JAC – Montell Owens – 11 rushes, 47 yards
- MIA – Reggie Bush – 21 rushes, 104 yards

**Top receivers**

- JAC – Cecil Shorts – 6 receptions, 101 yards
- MIA – Brian Hartline – 5 receptions, 77 yards

**Top tacklers**

- JAC – Paul Posluszny – 9 tackles, 1 assist
- MIA – Chris Clemons – 7 tackles, 2 assists

==== Week 16: vs. New England Patriots ====
Week Sixteen: New England Patriots at Jacksonville Jaguars – Game summary

Quarter	1	2	3	4	Total
**Patriots**	3	10	3	7	**23**
Jaguars	10	3	0	3	**16**

at EverBank Field, Jacksonville, Florida

- Date: December 23, 2012
- Game time: 1:00 p.m. EST
- Game weather: 58 °F (14 °C)
- Game attendance: 70,251
- Referee: Jeff Triplette
- TV announcers (CBS): Kevin Harlan and Solomon Wilcots
- Recap, Game Book

Game information

**First quarter**

- JAC – Justin Blackmon 3-yard pass from Chad Henne (Josh Scobee kick), 9:34. Jaguars 7–0. **Drive: 9 plays, 78 yards, 5:26.**
- JAC – Josh Scobee 41-yard field goal, 5:43. Jaguars 10–0. **Drive: 8 plays, 30 yards, 3:06.**
- NE – Stephen Gostkowski 25-yard field goal, 3:15. Jaguars 10–3. **Drive: 10 plays, 73 yards, 2:28.**

**Second quarter**

- JAC – Josh Scobee 35-yard field goal, 13:07. Jaguars 13–3. **Drive: 5 plays, 57 yards, 2:09.**
- NE – Stephen Gostkowski 49-yard field goal, 5:25. Jaguars 13–6. **Drive: 11 plays, 52 yards, 5:13.**
- NE – Danny Woodhead 14-yard pass from Tom Brady (Stephen Gostkowski kick), 0:18. Tied 13–13. **Drive: 10 plays, 66 yards, 3:31.**

**Third quarter**

- NE – Stephen Gostkowski 38-yard field goal, 11:44. Patriots 16–13. **Drive: 10 plays, 60 yards, 4:17.**

**Fourth quarter**

- NE – Wes Welker 2-yard pass from Tom Brady (Stephen Gostkowski kick), 14:15. Patriots 23–13. **Drive: 9 plays, 59 yards, 4:17.**
- JAC – Josh Scobee 42-yard field goal, 8:42. Patriots 23–16. **Drive: 11 plays, 56 yards, 5:33.**

**Top passers**

- NE – Tom Brady – 24/41, 267 yards, 2 TD, 2 INT
- JAC – Chad Henne – 29/51, 348 yards, TD, 3 INT

**Top rushers**

- NE – Stevan Ridley – 18 rushes, 84 yards
- JAC – Montell Owens – 10 rushes, 42 yards

**Top receivers**

- NE – Wes Welker – 10 receptions, 88 yards, TD
- JAC – Jordan Shipley – 5 receptions, 82 yards

**Top tacklers**

- NE – Kyle Arrington – 7 tackles
- JAC – Chris Prosinski – 8 tackles, INT

==== Week 17: at Tennessee Titans ====
Week Seventeen: Jacksonville Jaguars at Tennessee Titans – Game summary

Quarter	1	2	3	4	Total
Jaguars	7	7	0	6	**20**
**Titans**	7	14	14	3	**38**

at LP Field, Nashville, Tennessee

- Date: December 30, 2012
- Game time: 12:00 p.m. CST
- Game weather: Sunny, 39 °F (4 °C)
- Game attendance: 69,143
- Referee: Bill Vinovich
- TV announcers (CBS): Don Criqui and Randy Cross
- Recap, Game Book

Game information

**First quarter**

- TEN – Chris Johnson 2-yard run (Rob Bironas kick), 11:34. Titans 7–0. **Drive: 7 plays, 79 yards, 3:26.**
- JAC – Jordan Shipley 5-yard pass from Chad Henne (Josh Scobee kick), 5:40. Tied 7–7. **Drive: 10 plays, 76 yards, 5:54.**

**Second quarter**

- JAC – Justin Blackmon 30-yard pass from Chad Henne (Josh Scobee kick), 14:53. Jaguars 14–7. **Drive: 7 plays, 61 yards, 4:07.**
- TEN – Zach Brown 79-yard interception return (Rob Bironas kick), 1:48. Tied 14–14.
- TEN – Darius Reynaud 69-yard punt return (Rob Bironas kick), 0:33. Titans 21–14.

**Third quarter**

- TEN – Darius Reynaud 81-yard punt return (Rob Bironas kick), 12:54. Titans 28–14.
- TEN – Zach Brown 30-yard interception return (Rob Bironas kick), 12:03. Titans 35–14.

**Fourth quarter**

- TEN – Rob Bironas 48-yard field goal, 12:26. Titans 38–14. **Drive: 13 plays, 41 yards, 6:34.**
- JAC – Mike Harris 19-yard return of blocked punt (pass failed), 2:16. Titans 38–20.

**Top passers**

- JAC – Chad Henne – 25/41, 298 yards, 2 TD, 3 INT
- TEN – Jake Locker – 9/15, 152 yards

**Top rushers**

- JAC – Keith Toston – 17 rushes, 74 yards
- TEN – Chris Johnson – 21 rushes, 56 yards, TD

**Top receivers**

- JAC – Marcedes Lewis – 7 receptions, 103 yards
- TEN – Lavelle Hawkins – 1 reception, 42 yards

**Top tacklers**

- JAC – Paul Posluszny – 6 tackles, 4 assists, 2 sacks
- TEN – Al Afalava – 5 tackles, 4 assists

=== Standings ===
==== Division ====
AFC South
	W	L	T	PCT	DIV	CONF	PF	PA	STK
^{(3)} Houston Texans	12	4	0	.750	5–1	10–2	416	331	L2
^{(5)} Indianapolis Colts	11	5	0	.688	4–2	8–4	357	387	W2
Tennessee Titans	6	10	0	.375	1–5	5–7	330	471	W1
Jacksonville Jaguars	2	14	0	.125	2–4	2–10	255	444	L5

==== Conference ====
AFC
#	Team	Division	W	L	T	PCT	DIV	CONF	SOS	SOV	STK
**Division winners**
1	Denver Broncos	West	13	3	0	.813	6–0	10–2	.457	.385	W11
2 (Note: New England clinched the AFC's No. 2 seed over Houston based on a head-to-head victory.)	New England Patriots	East	12	4	0	.750	6–0	11–1	.496	.466	W2
3	Houston Texans	South	12	4	0	.750	5–1	10–2	.496	.432	L2
4 (Note: Baltimore clinched the AFC North title over Cincinnati based on a better divisional record (4–2 to 3–3).)	Baltimore Ravens	North	10	6	0	.625	4–2	8–4	.496	.438	L1
**Wild cards**
5	Indianapolis Colts	South	11	5	0	.688	4–2	8–4	.441	.403	W2
6	Cincinnati Bengals	North	10	6	0	.625	3–3	7–5	.438	.381	W3
**Did not qualify for the postseason**
7	Pittsburgh Steelers	North	8	8	0	.500	3–3	5–7	.465	.438	W1
8 (Note: San Diego finished with a better conference record than Miami (7–5 to 5–7).)	San Diego Chargers	West	7	9	0	.438	4–2	7–5	.457	.286	W2
9	Miami Dolphins	East	7	9	0	.438	2–4	5–7	.500	.415	L1
10 (Note: Tennessee finished ahead of New York Jets based on head-to-head victory.)	Tennessee Titans	South	6	10	0	.375	1–5	5–7	.512	.344	W1
11 (Note: New York Jets finished ahead of Buffalo in the AFC East based on record versus common opponents (5–7 to 3–9).)	New York Jets	East	6	10	0	.375	2–4	4–8	.512	.401	L3
12	Buffalo Bills	East	6	10	0	.375	2–4	5–7	.480	.281	W1
13	Cleveland Browns	North	5	11	0	.313	2–4	5–7	.508	.388	L3
14	Oakland Raiders	West	4	12	0	.250	2–4	4–8	.469	.219	L2
15 (Note: Jacksonville finished with a better conference record than Kansas City (2–10 to 0–12).)	Jacksonville Jaguars	South	2	14	0	.125	2–4	2–10	.539	.531	L5
16	Kansas City Chiefs	West	2	14	0	.125	0–6	0–12	.516	.438	L4
**Tiebreakers** (Note: When breaking ties for three or more teams under the NFL's rules, they are first broken within divisions, then comparing only the highest ranked remaining team from each division.)
