= 2012 Miami Dolphins season =

47th season in franchise history

- Owner: Stephen Ross
- General manager: Jeff Ireland
- Head coach: Joe Philbin
- Home stadium: Sun Life Stadium

Results
- Record: 7–9
- Division place: 2nd AFC East
- Playoffs: Did not qualify
- All-Pros: DE Cameron Wake
- Pro Bowlers: 4: LS John Denney; LG Richie Incognito^{[a]}; DT Randy Starks^{[b]}; DE Cameron Wake

Uniform
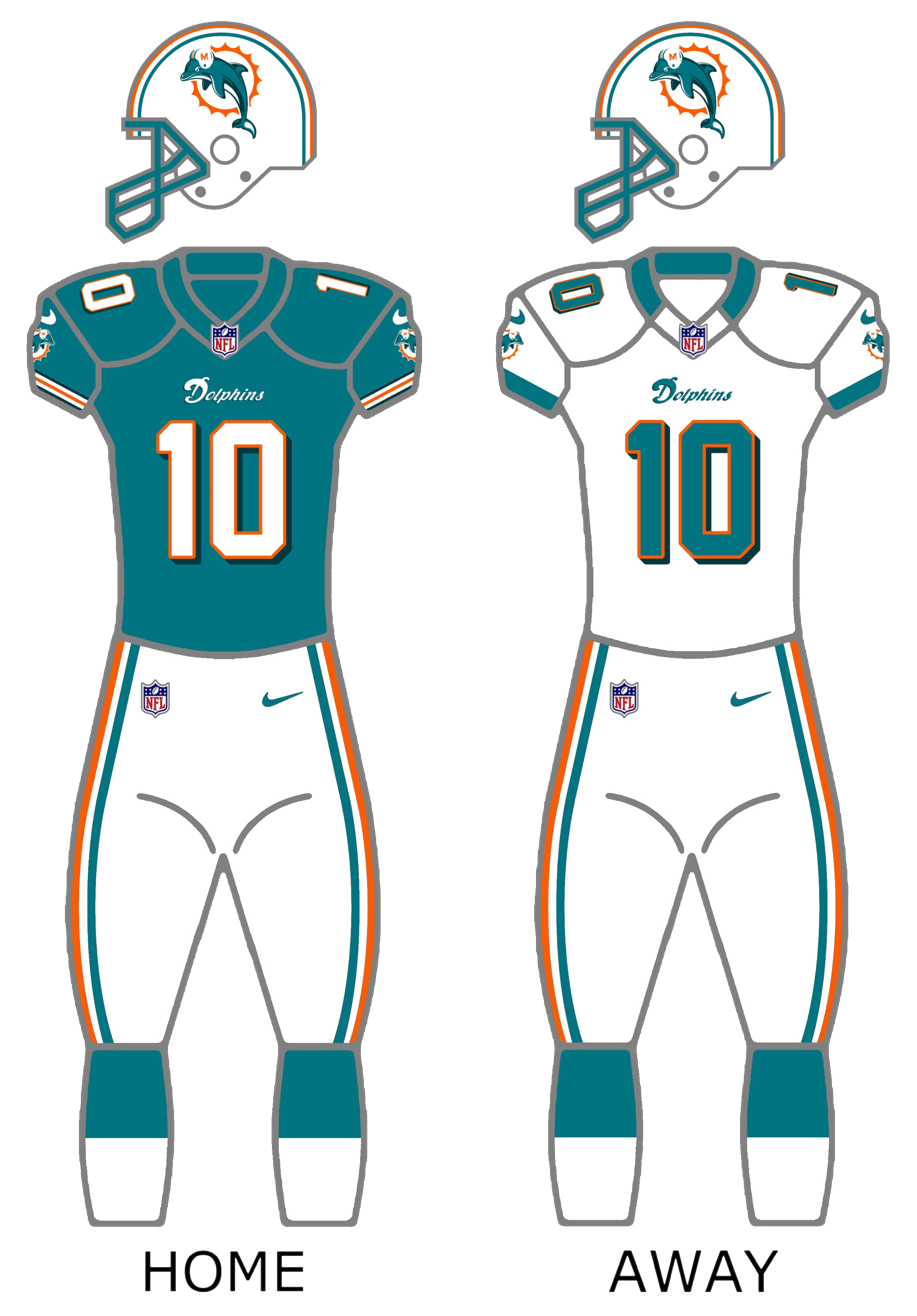

The 2012 season was the Miami Dolphins' 43rd in the National Football League (NFL) and their 47th overall. The season concluded with the Dolphins finishing second in the AFC East division with a 7–9 record, and no postseason play for the fourth consecutive season.

The Dolphins entered the season under new head coach Joe Philbin with hopes of revitalizing the franchise from three consecutive losing seasons under Tony Sparano. The team started with drafting quarterback Ryan Tannehill in the first round of the NFL draft, to compete for the starting job against incumbent Matt Moore and free agent David Garrard. Tannehill was eventually named the team's regular season starter heading in the second preseason game against the Carolina Panthers. The team finished the preseason with an 0–4 record for the third time in franchise history.

The Dolphins opened the regular season with a disappointing 30–10 loss against the Houston Texans, but a week later ended up with an impressive 35–13 win over the Oakland Raiders. Following the win, the Dolphins lost two close overtime games against the Arizona Cardinals and division rival New York Jets. However, Miami was able to come back and win three consecutive games including a blowout rematch with the New York Jets, but after close critical loses to the Indianapolis Colts, division rival Buffalo Bills and New England Patriots, the Dolphins were unable to achieve a winning season.

Ryan Tannehill became the first rookie quarterback in Dolphins history to complete a full season as the team's starting quarterback. During the week four game against the Arizona Cardinals, Tannehill broke former Dolphins quarterback Dan Marino's single-game rookie passing record with 431 passing yards and came one yard short of breaking Cam Newton's NFL rookie single-game passing record. In the same game wide receiver Brian Hartline broke the Dolphins single-game receiving record with 12 receptions for 253 yards.

== Personnel changes ==
Despite getting an extension through 2013 in the early 2011 off-season, head coach Tony Sparano was fired by the team after 13 disappointing games into the 2011 season with a 4–9 record. In Sparano's first year 2008, he orchestrated the second greatest record turnaround in NFL history with an 11–5 record from a 1–15 record between the 2007–2008 NFL seasons, and finished second behind Atlanta Falcons' head coach Mike Smith in voting for the 2008 AP NFL Coach of the Year. However, Sparano failed to capitalize, posting mediocre records in his final three seasons as head coach. Following Sparano's firing, assistant head coach Todd Bowles reigned control of the team for the final three games, and entered the off-season as the lead candidate for the 2012 Miami Dolphins' head coaching position.

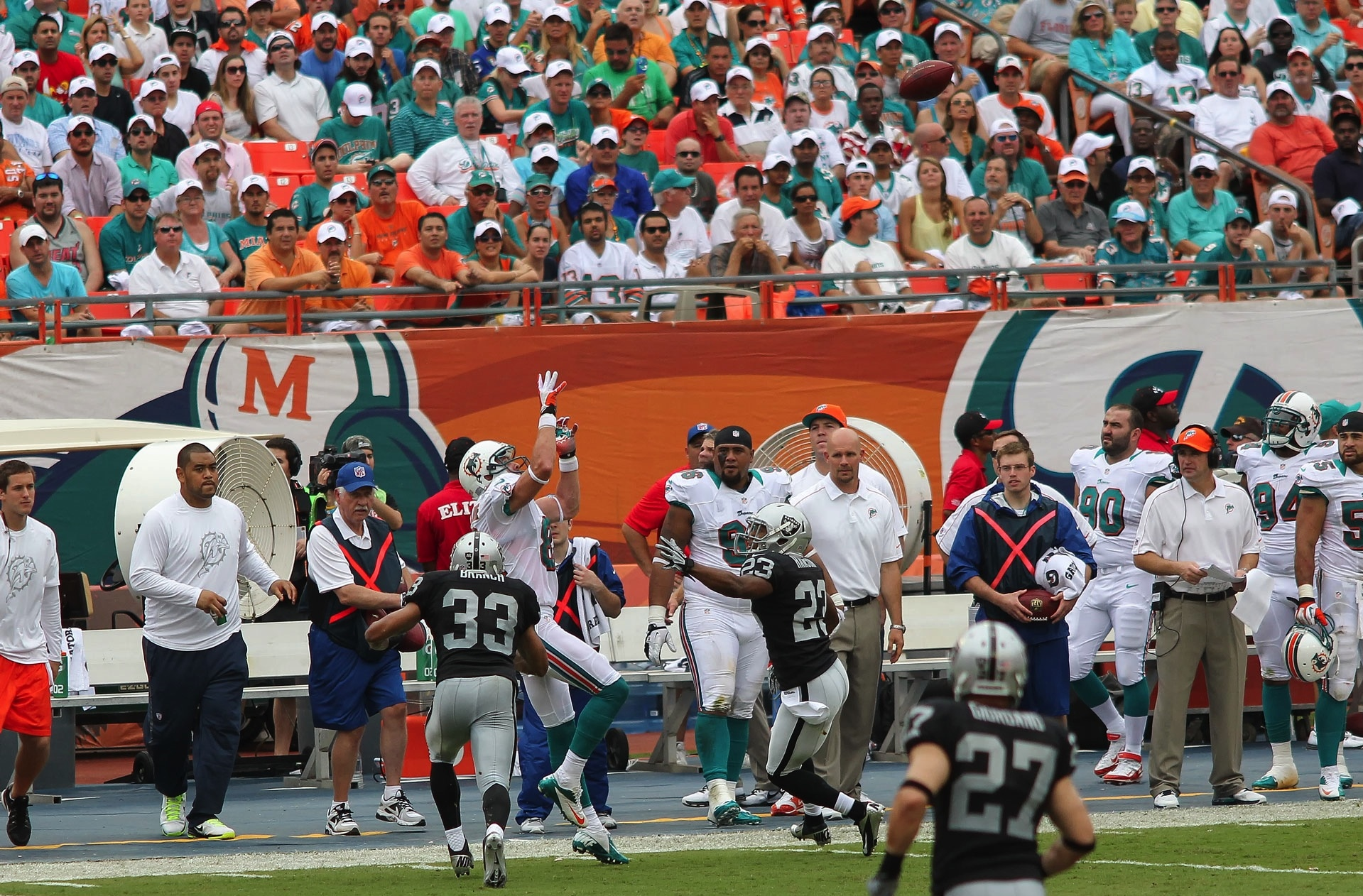
Brian Hartline in the game against the Oakland Raiders, September 16

Former Tennessee Titans' head coach Jeff Fisher entered talks as becoming the next Dolphins' head coach, and the Dolphins organization openly pursued him as a top candidate. Other coaches drawing interest were Green Bay Packers' offensive coordinator Joe Philbin, Cincinnati Bengals' defensive coordinator Mike Zimmer, Chicago Bears' special teams coordinator Dave Toub, and Denver Broncos' offensive coordinator Mike McCoy. Ultimately on January 13, 2012, Fisher decided to pursue the vacant St. Louis Rams' head coaching position, and subsequently on January 20, 2012, the Dolphins hired former Green Bay Packers' offensive coordinator Joe Philbin as the franchise's tenth head coach.

On January 27, 2012, the new coaching regime came into shape with the signing of Philbin's longtime friends: former Texas A&M head coach Mike Sherman and Cincinnati Bengals defensive back coach Kevin Coyle, as offensive and defensive coordinators, respectively.

Sherman, who was fired by Texas A&M earlier this year after posted a 25–25 record in his four seasons, gave Philbin his first NFL job when he served as head coach for the Green Bay Packers. At the time of signing with the Dolphins, Sherman was also a finalist for the vacant head coaching job for the Tampa Bay Buccaneers. Coyle had spent the last 11 seasons as a part of the Bengals organization. Both had served as coaches together at the College of the Holy Cross between 1985 and 1988.

The rest of Philbin's coaching regime includes the acquisition of linebackers coach George Edwards, and assistant quarterbacks coach Zac Taylor on January 30, 2012. Acquirement of offensive line coach Jim Turner on February 1, 2012, assistant defensive line backs coach Blue Adams, defensive assistant Charlie Bullen, offensive assistant Ben Johnson and Chris Mosley as offensive assistant line coach on February 10, 2012. Philbin also retained the contracts of tight ends coach Dan Campbell, strength coach Darren Krein, special teams coordinator Darren Rizzi, and Jeff Nixon as running backs coach from coach Sparano's tenure.

== Roster changes ==
After an unpromising 13–18 record as a starter, the Miami Dolphins decided not to renew the contract of quarterback Chad Henne. In early March, Henne became an unrestricted free agent, along with defensive end Kendall Langford. Shortly after, on March 14, 2012, Henne signed a two-year contract with the Jacksonville Jaguars and on March 17, 2012, Langford signed a four-year deal with the St. Louis Rams.

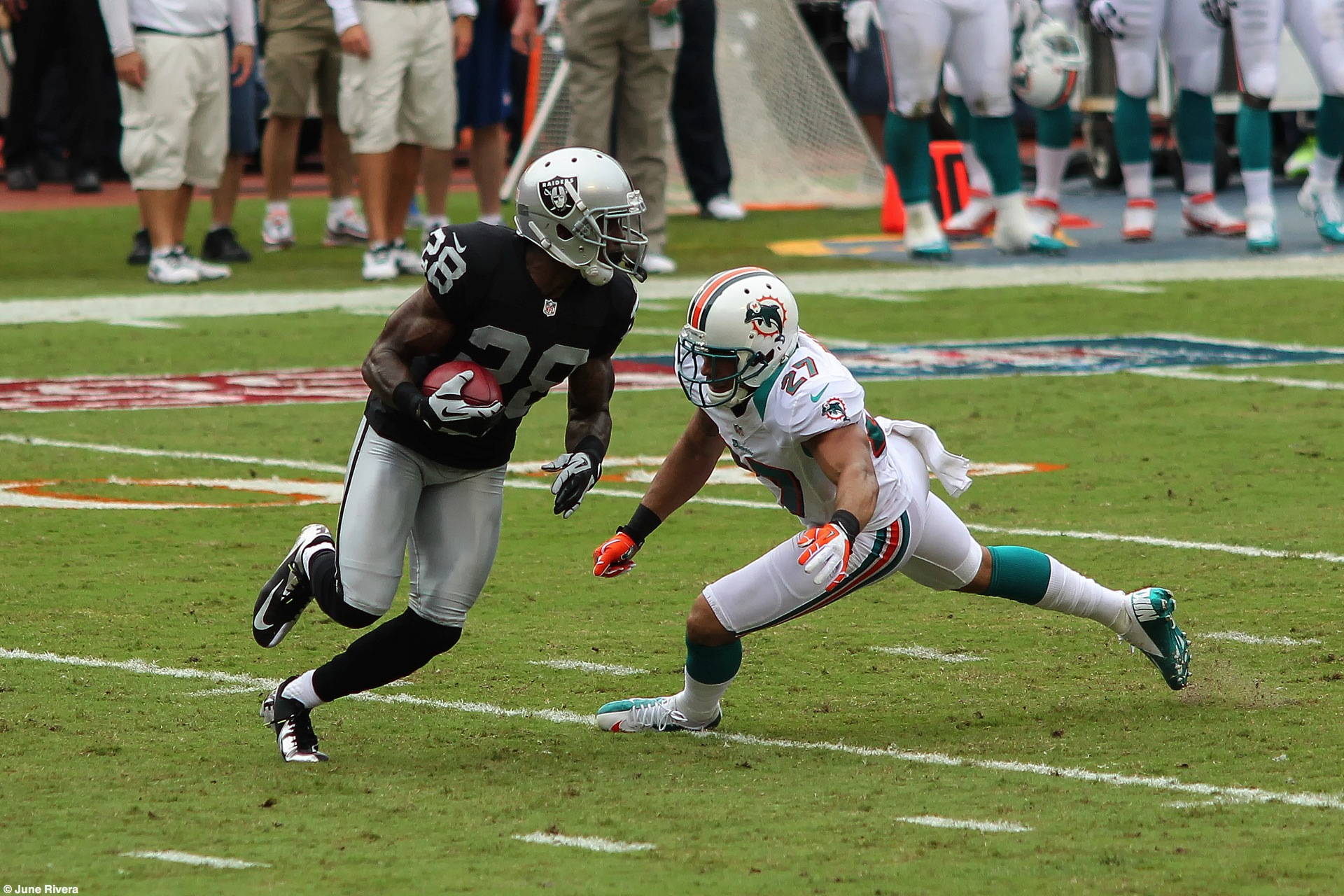
Miami Dolphins cornerback Jimmy Wilson challenges Raiders running back Phillip Adams, September 16

The Dolphins' first major transaction of the off-season was the trade of 2011 Pro Bowl wide receiver Brandon Marshall. After being acquired in a trade two years prior from the Denver Broncos, Marshall was traded to the Chicago Bears on March 13, 2012. The trade further opened up speculation that the Dolphins were trying to gain more cap space to sign free agent wide receiver Reggie Wayne, to lure former teammate and free agent quarterback Peyton Manning to Miami. The Dolphins were one of the teams who've considered signing the long-time Colts quarterback, along with the Tennessee Titans, Arizona Cardinals, and Seattle Seahawks. Manning ultimately signed with the Denver Broncos where he spent the rest of his career. However, speculation was quickly suppressed when Wayne re-signed with the Indianapolis Colts, leaving the Dolphins without a number one wide receiver entering the draft.

On March 14, 2012, the Dolphins re-signed defensive tackle Paul Soliai, to a two-year deal worth $12 million. They also extended the contract of linebacker Cameron Wake through the 2016 season on May 5, 2012. The contract was worth $49 million over five years, with a guaranteed $20 million. During the season, the Dolphins extended the contract of punter Brandon Fields, to four years worth $13 million, on August 4, 2012.

To compete against incumbent starting quarterback Matt Moore, the Dolphins signed quarterback David Garrard on March 19, 2012. However, after suffering a knee injury during training camp, Garrard was released on September 4, 2012.

The Dolphins also released veteran and team captain strong safety Yeremiah Bell on March 19, 2012. The transaction saved the Dolphins $4.3 million in cap space, and allowed two-year safety Reshad Jones to move to the position. Bell eventually signed a one-year deal with the division-rival New York Jets on May 18, 2012.

To fill the vacancy left by Brandon Marshall, the Dolphins signed veteran receiver Chad Johnson (whose last name was Ochocinco at the time of the signing) on June 11, 2012. During training camp, Johnson's work ethic, which was highlighted on HBO's Hard Knocks, put him on track to make the opening day roster; however, a domestic dispute between Johnson and his wife Evelyn Lozada prompted the Dolphins to release him on August 12, 2012.

After struggling to adapt to new defensive coordinator Kevin Coyle's system, the Dolphins traded former first-round pick and cornerback Vontae Davis on August 24, 2012. In return, the Dolphins received a second-round and conditional late-round 2013 NFL draft pick^{[c]} .

=== 2012 draft class ===
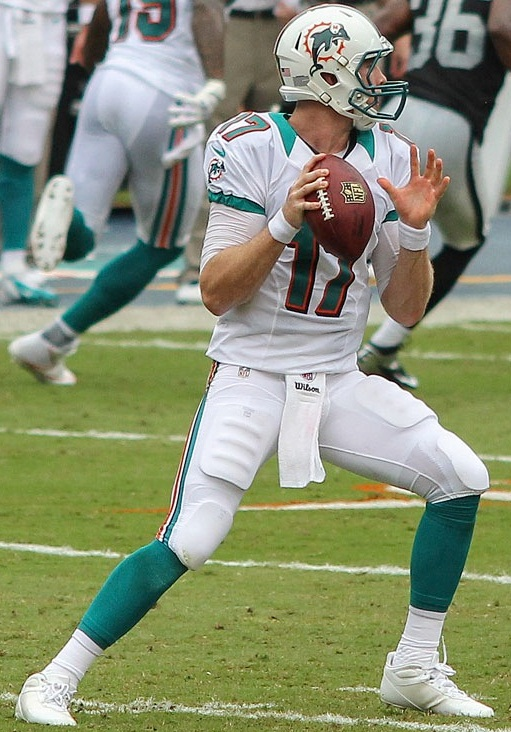
Ryan Tannehill, the Miami Dolphins' 2012 first-round draft selection

The 2012 National Football League Draft was held April 26–28 in the Radio City Music Hall in New York City, New York. Entering the draft, the Miami Dolphins major positions to fill were quarterback and wide receiver. The Dolphins needed a long-term quarterback to take over for incumbent starter Matt Moore at the end of the season, after negotiations failed with top free agent quarterbacks Peyton Manning and Matt Flynn. Many analysts, including ESPN's Adam Schefter, believed the Dolphins would draft Texas A&M quarterback Ryan Tannehill with the 8th overall pick, if the Cleveland Browns, who held the 4th overall pick, didn't first. Also, many debated that Tannehill, who was once a wide receiver recently turned quarterback, was not deserving of a top 10 pick.

Ultimately, with the 8th overall pick of the first round, the Dolphins selected Tannehill. The selection marked the fourth time that the Dolphins had selected a quarterback in the first round of a draft since Dan Marino in 1983, Bob Griese in 1967, and Rick Norton in 1966. With their second pick, the Dolphins selected offensive tackle Jonathan Martin from Stanford.

Round	Selection	Player	Position	College
1	8	Ryan Tannehill	Quarterback	Texas A&M
2	42	Jonathan Martin	Offensive Tackle	Stanford
3	72	Olivier Vernon	Defensive End	Miami (FL)
3	78^{[a]}	Michael Egnew	Tight End	Missouri
4	103^{[b]}	Lamar Miller	Running Back	Miami (FL)
5	155^{[c]}	Josh Kaddu	Linebacker	Oregon
6	183	B.J. Cunningham	Wide Receiver	Michigan State
7	215	Kheeston Randall	Defensive Tackle	Texas
7	227^{[c]}	Rishard Matthews	Wide Receiver	Nevada

Notes

^{^[a]} The team acquired an additional third-round selection (#73 overall) as part of a trade that sent wide receiver Brandon Marshall to the Chicago Bears. The team then swapped third-round selections (#73 and #78) with the San Diego Chargers and received an extra sixth-round pick (#183).
^{^[b]} The team swapped sixth-round selections with the New Orleans Saints (the Dolphins originally held the #179 selection) as part of a trade in which the team acquired running back Reggie Bush from the Saints. The 196th pick was then used in order for Miami to trade up in the fourth round to select Lamar Miller (from #103 to #97).
^{^[c]} The team swapped fifth-round selections with the Tennessee Titans (the Dolphins originally held the #145 selection) and received an extra seventh-round selection (#227).

== Schedule ==
=== Preseason ===
Week	Date	Opponent	Result	Record	Game site	NFL.com recap
1	August 10	Tampa Bay Buccaneers	**L** 7–20	0–1	Sun Life Stadium	Recap
2	August 17	at Carolina Panthers	**L** 17–23	0–2	Bank of America Stadium	Recap
3	August 24	Atlanta Falcons	**L** 6–23	0–3	Sun Life Stadium	Recap
4	August 29	at Dallas Cowboys	**L** 13–30	0–4	Cowboys Stadium	Recap

=== Regular season ===
Week	Date	Opponent	Result	Record	Game site	NFL.com recap
1	September 9	at Houston Texans	**L** 10–30	0–1	Reliant Stadium	Recap
2	September 16	Oakland Raiders	**W** 35–13	1–1	Sun Life Stadium	Recap
3	September 23	**New York Jets**	**L** 20–23 (OT)	1–2	Sun Life Stadium	Recap
4	September 30	at Arizona Cardinals	**L** 21–24 (OT)	1–3	University of Phoenix Stadium	Recap
5	October 7	at Cincinnati Bengals	**W** 17–13	2–3	Paul Brown Stadium	Recap
6	October 14	St. Louis Rams	**W** 17–14	3–3	Sun Life Stadium	Recap
7	Bye					
8	October 28	at **New York Jets**	**W** 30–9	4–3	MetLife Stadium	Recap
9	November 4	at Indianapolis Colts	**L** 20–23	4–4	Lucas Oil Stadium	Recap
10	November 11	Tennessee Titans	**L** 3–37	4–5	Sun Life Stadium	Recap
11	November 15	at **Buffalo Bills**	**L** 14–19	4–6	Ralph Wilson Stadium	Recap
12	November 25	Seattle Seahawks	**W** 24–21	5–6	Sun Life Stadium	Recap
13	December 2	**New England Patriots**	**L** 16–23	5–7	Sun Life Stadium	Recap
14	December 9	at San Francisco 49ers	**L** 13–27	5–8	Candlestick Park	Recap
15	December 16	Jacksonville Jaguars	**W** 24–3	6–8	Sun Life Stadium	Recap
16	December 23	**Buffalo Bills**	**W** 24–10	7–8	Sun Life Stadium	Recap
17	December 30	at **New England Patriots**	**L** 0–28	7–9	Gillette Stadium	Recap

Note: Intra-division opponents are in bold text.

=== Game summaries ===
==== Week 1: at Houston Texans ====
Week One: Miami Dolphins at Houston Texans – Game summary

Quarter	1	2	3	4	Total
Dolphins	3	0	7	0	**10**
**Texans**	0	24	3	3	**30**

at Reliant Stadium, Houston, Texas

- Date: September 9
- Game time: 1:03 p.m. EDT
- Game weather: Played indoors (retractable roof closed)
- Game attendance: 71,566
- Referee: Donald King
- TV announcers (CBS): Ian Eagle and Dan Fouts

Game information

**First quarter**

- MIA – Dan Carpenter 39-yard field goal, 3:12. Dolphins 3–0. **Drive: 8 plays, 37 yards, 3:58.**

**Second quarter**

- HOU – Shayne Graham 35-yard field goal, 6:12. Tied 3–3. **Drive: 4 plays, -10 yards, 1:11.**
- HOU – Arian Foster 14-yard run (Shayne Graham kick), 1:53. Texans 10–3. **Drive: 7 plays, 54 yards, 2:07.**
- HOU – Arian Foster 2-yard run (Shayne Graham kick), 0:43. Texans 17–3. **Drive: 2 plays, 27 yards, 0:53.**
- HOU – Andre Johnson 14-yard pass from Matt Schaub (Shayne Graham kick), 0:07. Texans 24–3. **Drive: 3 plays, 31 yards, 0:21.**

**Third quarter**

- MIA – Marcus Thigpen 72-yard punt return (Dan Carpenter kick), 13:12. Texans 24–10.
- HOU – Shayne Graham 40-yard field goal, 6:30. Texans 27–10. **Drive: 11 plays, 64 yards, 6:42.**

**Fourth quarter**

- HOU – Shayne Graham 19-yard field goal, 12:22. Texans 30–10. **Drive: 12 plays, 72 yards, 6:59.**

**Top passers**

- MIA – Ryan Tannehill – 20/36, 219 yards, 3 INT
- HOU – Matt Schaub – 20/31, 266 yards, TD

**Top rushers**

- MIA – Reggie Bush – 14 rushes, 69 yards
- HOU – Arian Foster – 26 rushes, 79 yards, 2 TD

**Top receivers**

- MIA – Brian Hartline – 3 receptions, 50 yards
- HOU – Andre Johnson – 8 receptions, 119 yards, TD

The Dolphins entered their first game of the season with a 0–0 record, traveling to face the 0–0 Houston Texans. The game was the first start for rookie quarterback Ryan Tannehill and head coach Joe Philbin. Tannehill became the first Dolphins rookie quarterback to start the first game of the season. Entering the game the Texans are the only team the Dolphins have not beaten, holding a 0–6 record all-time against the team.

Both teams moved the ball well on their opening drives, but failed to score. The Dolphins received the ball on their own 42-yard line after a missed field goal by Houston kicker Shayne Graham. After a Reggie Bush recovered fumble on 3rd down on the Houston 14-yard line the Dolphins kicker Dan Carpenter attempted and successfully executed a 39-yard field goal with (3:19) left in the first quarter.

Both defenses held steady, keeping both offenses out of the redzone heading to the mid-way point of the second quarter. However, at the (7:35) point, quarterback Tannehill was intercepted by Johnathan Joseph at the 50-yard line for 36 yards. Within the shadow of their own goal posts the Dolphins held the Texans to a Shayne Graham 35-yard field goal. The interception by Tannehill was the first of his career, and marked a downhill spiral for the rest of the game.

Following the score the Dolphins moved quickly to the Houston side of the field after a 10-yard rush by Reggie Bush and 32-yard pass to running back Daniel Thomas. But after a few incomplete passes, Tannehill had his pass intended for receiver Legadu Naanee deflected by a defensive lineman and intercepted by linebacker Brian Cushing with (4:06) left in the second quarter. The Texans quickly turned the turnover into points, with an Arian Foster 14-yard rush.

On the first play following the Houston kickoff quarterback Tannehill again had his pass deflected by a defensive lineman, but instead was intercepted by Kareem Jackson. After a defensive pass interference penalty, running back Arian Foster rushed for his second rushing touchdown of the game at the (0:49) mark. Again following the kickoff the Dolphins again turned the ball over following a Daniel Thomas fumble. The turnover was shortly followed by a 14-yard pass touchdown from Houston quarterback Matt Schaub to receiver Andre Johnson at the (0:12) mark.

Following a quick three and out by the Texans following halftime, punt returner Marcus Thigpen returned a punt for 72 yards for a touchdown. But for the remainder of the game the Dolphins offense failed to produce any scores, but held the Texans defense to two Shayne Graham field goals: 40 and 19 yards, respectively.

==== Week 2: vs. Oakland Raiders ====
Week Two: Oakland Raiders at Miami Dolphins – Game summary

Quarter	1	2	3	4	Total
Raiders	7	3	0	3	**13**
**Dolphins**	7	0	14	14	**35**

at Sun Life Stadium, Miami Gardens, Florida

- Date: September 16
- Game time: 1:00 p.m. EDT/10:00 a.m. PDT
- Game weather: 80 °F (27 °C), cloudy
- Game attendance: 54,245
- Referee: Mike Shepherd
- TV announcers (CBS): Kevin Harlan and Solomon Wilcots

Game information

**First quarter**

- MIA – Ryan Tannehill 2-yard run (Dan Carpenter kick), 9:19. Dolphins 7–0. **Drive: 12 plays, 80 yards, 5:41.**
- OAK – Mike Goodson 64-yard pass from Carson Palmer (Sebastian Janikowski kick), 0:11. Tied 7–7. **Drive: 6 plays, 92 yards, 3:17.**

**Second quarter**

- OAK – Sebastian Janikowski 25-yard field goal, 0:46. Raiders 10–7. **Drive: 12 plays, 81 yards, 2:47.**

**Third quarter**

- MIA – Reggie Bush 23-yard run (Dan Carpenter kick), 7:57. Dolphins 14–10. **Drive: 4 plays, 44 yards, 1:37.**
- MIA – Reggie Bush 65-yard run (Dan Carpenter kick), 3:52. Dolphins 21–10. **Drive: 3 plays, 80 yards, 1:22.**

**Fourth quarter**

- OAK – Sebastian Janikowski 27-yard field goal, 14:50. Dolphins 21–13. **Drive: 5 plays, 15 yards, 1:25.**
- MIA – Anthony Fasano 14-yard pass from Ryan Tannehill (Dan Carpenter kick), 11:45. Dolphins 28–13. **Drive: 8 plays, 80 yards, 3:05.**
- MIA – Lamar Miller 15-yard run (Dan Carpenter kick), 5:06. Dolphins 35–13. **Drive: 8 plays, 75 yards, 5:18.**

**Top passers**

- OAK – Carson Palmer – 24/48, 373 yards, TD, INT
- MIA – Ryan Tannehill – 18/30, 200 yards, TD

**Top rushers**

- OAK – Darren McFadden – 11 rushes, 22 yards
- MIA – Reggie Bush – 26 rushes, 172 yards, 2 TD

**Top receivers**

- OAK – Brandon Myers – 6 receptions, 86 yards
- MIA – Brian Hartline – 9 receptions, 111 yards

The Dolphins entered their second game of the season with a 0–1 record, hosting the 0–1 Oakland Raiders. The game marked the third consecutive season game between the two teams and 36th all-time, with the Dolphins winning the last two games with an average margin of victory of 18 points.

Miami opened the game with an impressive 80-yard drive after the opening kickoff, which lead to a quarterback Ryan Tannehill two-yard rushing touchdown. Two possessions later at the (3:28) mark in the first quarter, Oakland quarterback Carson Palmer threw a 64-yard touchdown to Mike Goodson tying the game.

Through a majority of the second quarter both teams had a hard time moving across the 50-yard line, which was matched with impressive punting by both Dolphins punter Brandon Fields and Oakland punter Shane Lechler. By the end of the game Field punted the ball six times for 319 yards with an average yard per punt of 53.2 and Lechler punted the ball nine times for 422 yards with an average yard per punt of 46.9. However, Oakland managed to get the ball back with (3:33) left in the quarter and orchestrated a drive that ended with a Sebastian Janikowski 25-yard field goal. Both teams entered halftime evenly matched.

It didn't take long following halftime for the Dolphins rushing attack to shine. On the second possession of the half the Dolphins drove the ball down field and allowed Reggie Bush to rush for a 25-yard touchdown. On the next Miami possession, after a quick pass from Tannehill to receiver Brian Hartline, Reggie Bush rushed 65 yards for another Miami touchdown. A few possessions later Oakland answered with a Janikowski 27-yard field goal.

With little opposition from the Oakland defense Miami's offense kept the ball moving and managed to score on their next two possessions. Once with an Anthony Fasano 14-yard reception touchdown from Tannehill, the first of his career, and again with a Lamar Miller 15-yard rushing touchdown, the first of his career. Oakland tried to stop the bleeding on their next drive, but quarterback Palmer was intercepted by safety Reshad Jones.

The impressive game of 172 rushing yards on 26 attempts by running back Reggie Bush earned him the week 2 AFC Offensive Player of the Week and FedEx Air and Ground rusher of the week honors.

==== Week 3: vs. New York Jets ====
Week Three: New York Jets at Miami Dolphins – Game summary

Quarter	1	2	3	4	OT	Total
**Jets**	0	3	7	10	3	**23**
Dolphins	7	3	7	3	0	**20**

at Sun Life Stadium, Miami Gardens, Florida

- Date: September 23
- Game time: 1:00 p.m. EDT
- Game weather: 83 °F (28 °C), mostly cloudy
- Game attendance: 60,102
- Referee: Robert Frazer
- TV announcers (CBS): Marv Albert and Rich Gannon

Game information

**First quarter**

- MIA – Daniel Thomas 1-yard run (Dan Carpenter kick), 9:14. Dolphins 7–0. **Drive: 8 plays, 47 yards, 4:06.**

**Second quarter**

- MIA – Dan Carpenter 21-yard field goal, 8:26. Dolphins 10–0. **Drive: 13 plays, 75 yards, 5:48.**
- NYJ – Nick Folk 33-yard field goal, 1:50. Dolphins 10–3. **Drive: 16 plays, 67 yards, 6:36.**

**Third quarter**

- NYJ – LaRon Landry 18-yard interception return (Nick Folk kick), 14:16. Tied 10–10.
- MIA – Jorvorskie Lane 1-yard run (Dan Carpenter kick), 1:45. Dolphins 17–10. **Drive: 11 plays, 80 yards, 4:21.**

**Fourth quarter**

- NYJ – Nick Folk 20-yard field goal, 13:29. Dolphins 17–13. **Drive: 7 plays, 73 yards, 3:16.**
- NYJ – Jeremy Kerley 7-yard pass from Mark Sanchez (Nick Folk kick), 3:01. Jets 20–17. **Drive: 8 plays, 53 yards, 2:33.**
- MIA – Dan Carpenter 41-yard field goal, 0:16. Tied 20–20. **Drive: 12 plays, 48 yards, 2:45.**

**Overtime**

- NYJ – Nick Folk 33-yard field goal, 6:04. Jets 23–20. **Drive: 5 plays, 47 yards, 1:49.**

**Top passers**

- NYJ – Mark Sanchez – 21/45, 306 yards, TD, 2 INT
- MIA – Ryan Tannehill – 16/36, 196 yards, INT

**Top rushers**

- NYJ – Shonn Greene – 19 rushes, 40 yards
- MIA – Daniel Thomas – 19 rushes, 69 yards, TD

**Top receivers**

- NYJ – Santonio Holmes – 9 receptions, 147 yards
- MIA – Davone Bess – 5 receptions, 86 yards

With the loss, the Dolphins fell to 1–2.

==== Week 4: at Arizona Cardinals ====
Week Four: Miami Dolphins at Arizona Cardinals – Game summary

Quarter	1	2	3	4	OT	Total
Dolphins	0	13	0	8	0	**21**
**Cardinals**	0	0	7	14	3	**24**

at University of Phoenix Stadium, Glendale, Arizona

- Date: September 30
- Game time: 4:05 p.m. EDT/1:05 p.m. Arizona time
- Game weather: Played indoors (retractable roof closed)
- Game attendance: 60,183
- Referee: Scott Green
- TV announcers (CBS): Bill Macatee and Steve Tasker

Game information

**First quarter**

- No scoring plays.

**Second quarter**

- MIA – Dan Carpenter 32-yard field goal, 13:15. Dolphins 3–0. **Drive: 14 plays, 64 yards, 5:49.**
- MIA – Jorvorskie Lane 1-yard run (Dan Carpenter kick), 1:56. Dolphins 10–0. **Drive: 8 plays, 95 yards, 3:49.**
- MIA – Dan Carpenter 27-yard field goal, 0:03. Dolphins 13–0. **Drive: 3 plays, 25 yards, 0:24.**

**Third quarter**

- ARI – Larry Fitzgerald 3-yard pass from Kevin Kolb (Jay Feely kick), 9:46. Dolphins 13–7. **Drive: 8 plays, 59 yards, 2:57.**

**Fourth quarter**

- ARI – Andre Roberts 46-yard pass from Kevin Kolb (Jay Feely kick), 9:45. Cardinals 14–13. **Drive: 3 plays, 81 yards, 1:27.**
- MIA – Brian Hartline 80-yard pass from Ryan Tannehill (Ryan Tannehill-Jorvorskie Lane pass), 7:05. Dolphins 21–14. **Drive: 1 play, 80 yards, 0:12.**
- ARI – Andre Roberts 15-yard pass from Kevin Kolb (Jay Feely kick), 0:22. Tied 21–21. **Drive: 10 plays, 51 yards, 2:29.**

**Overtime**

- ARI – Jay Feely 46-yard field goal, 8:46. Cardinals 24–21. **Drive: 7 plays, 19 yards, 3:30.**

**Top passers**

- MIA – Ryan Tannehill – 26/41, 431 yards, TD, 2 INT
- ARI – Kevin Kolb – 29/48, 324 yards, 3 TD, 2 INT

**Top rushers**

- MIA – Reggie Bush – 17 rushes, 67 yards
- ARI – Ryan Williams – 13 rushes, 26 yards

**Top receivers**

- MIA – Brian Hartline – 12 receptions, 253 yards, TD
- ARI – Andre Roberts – 6 receptions, 118 yards, 2 TD

The Dolphins were seeking their first win in Phoenix since 1996. However, they were defeated in overtime for the second consecutive week. With the loss, the Dolphins fell to 1–3.

==== Week 5: at Cincinnati Bengals ====
Week Five: Miami Dolphins at Cincinnati Bengals – Game summary

Quarter	1	2	3	4	Total
**Dolphins**	0	7	10	0	**17**
Bengals	6	0	0	7	**13**

at Paul Brown Stadium, Cincinnati, Ohio

- Date: October 7
- Game time: 1:00 p.m. EDT
- Game weather: 49 °F (9 °C), cloudy
- Game attendance: 61,162
- Referee: Walt Coleman
- TV announcers (CBS): Marv Albert and Rich Gannon

Game information

**First quarter**

- CIN – Mike Nugent 42-yard field goal, 10:35. Bengals 3–0. **Drive: 4 plays, 2 yards, 1:19.**
- CIN – Mike Nugent 24-yard field goal, 0:13. Bengals 6–0. **Drive: 13 plays, 72 yards, 6:02.**

**Second quarter**

- MIA – Daniel Thomas 1-yard run (Dan Carpenter kick), 6:54. Dolphins 7–6. **Drive: 9 plays, 63 yards, 4:04.**

**Third quarter**

- MIA – Reggie Bush 13-yard run (Dan Carpenter kick), 12:18. Dolphins 14–6. **Drive: 3 plays, 36 yards, 0:54.**
- MIA – Dan Carpenter 46-yard field goal, 8:35. Dolphins 17–6. **Drive: 7 plays, 22 yards, 2:39.**

**Fourth quarter**

- CIN – A. J. Green 2-yard pass from Andy Dalton (Mike Nugent kick), 14:15. Dolphins 17–13. **Drive: 9 plays, 57 yards, 5:07.**

**Top passers**

- MIA – Ryan Tannehill – 17/26, 223 yards
- CIN – Andy Dalton – 26/43, 234 yards, TD, 2 INT

**Top rushers**

- MIA – Reggie Bush – 19 rushes, 48 yards, TD
- CIN – Bernard Scott – 5 rushes, 40 yards

**Top receivers**

- MIA – Brian Hartline – 4 receptions, 59 yards
- CIN – A. J. Green – 9 receptions, 65 yards, TD

With the win, the Dolphins improved to 2–3.

==== Week 6: vs. St. Louis Rams ====
Week Six: St. Louis Rams at Miami Dolphins – Game summary

Quarter	1	2	3	4	Total
Rams	6	0	0	8	**14**
**Dolphins**	0	10	7	0	**17**

at Sun Life Stadium, Miami Gardens, Florida

- Date: October 14
- Game time: 1:00 p.m. EDT
- Game weather: 84 °F (29 °C), cloudy
- Game attendance: 52,983
- Referee: Gene Steratore
- TV announcers (Fox): Chris Myers, Tim Ryan and Jaime Maggio

Game information

**First quarter**

- STL – Greg Zuerlein 48-yard field goal, 12:25. Rams 3–0. **Drive: 6 plays, 50 yards, 2:35.**
- STL – Greg Zuerlein 32-yard field goal, 5:08. Rams 6–0. **Drive: 8 plays, 78 yards, 3:38.**

**Second quarter**

- MIA – Marlon Moore 29-yard pass from Ryan Tannehill (Dan Carpenter kick), 5:27. Dolphins 7–6. **Drive: 6 plays, 58 yards, 3:08.**
- MIA – Dan Carpenter 42-yard field goal, 4:19. Dolphins 10–6. **Drive: 4 plays, 0 yards, 0:57.**

**Third quarter**

- MIA – Anthony Fasano 1-yard pass from Ryan Tannehill (Dan Carpenter kick), 9:40. Dolphins 17–6. **Drive: 10 plays, 62 yards, 5:20.**

**Fourth quarter**

- STL – Sam Bradford 1-yard run (Sam Bradford-Steven Jackson pass), 8:30. Dolphins 17–14. **Drive: 11 plays, 62 yards, 5:33.**

**Top passers**

- STL – Sam Bradford – 26/39, 315 yards
- MIA – Ryan Tannehill – 21/29, 185 yards, 2 TD

**Top rushers**

- STL – Daryl Richardson – 11 rushes, 76 yards
- MIA – Reggie Bush – 12 rushes, 17 yards

**Top receivers**

- STL – Brandon Gibson – 7 receptions, 91 yards
- MIA – Marlon Moore – 3 receptions, 46 yards, TD

With the win, the Dolphins head into their bye week at 3–3.

==== Week 8: at New York Jets ====
Week Eight: Miami Dolphins at New York Jets – Game summary

Quarter	1	2	3	4	Total
**Dolphins**	10	10	7	3	**30**
Jets	0	0	3	6	**9**

at MetLife Stadium, East Rutherford, New Jersey

- Date: October 28
- Game time: 1:00 p.m. EDT
- Game weather: 60 °F (16 °C), Wind: NNE 9mph gusting to 17mph
- Game attendance: 79,088
- Referee: Walt Anderson
- TV announcers (CBS): Ian Eagle and Dan Fouts

Game information

**First quarter**

- MIA – Dan Carpenter 33-yard field goal, 11:02. Dolphins 3–0. **Drive: 9 plays, 63 yards, 3:58.**
- MIA – Olivier Vernon recovery of blocked punt in endzone (Dan Carpenter kick), 3:59. Dolphins 10–0.

**Second quarter**

- MIA – Daniel Thomas 3-yard run (Dan Carpenter kick), 14:08. Dolphins 17–0. **Drive: 6 plays, 32 yards, 2:36.**
- MIA – Dan Carpenter 39-yard field goal, 6:59. Dolphins 20–0. **Drive: 7 plays, 44 yards, 2:26.**

**Third quarter**

- NYJ – Nick Folk 38-yard field goal, 11:53. Dolphins 20–3. **Drive: 8 plays, 34 yards, 3:07.**
- MIA – Anthony Fasano 4-yard pass from Matt Moore (Dan Carpenter kick), 8:46. Dolphins 27–3. **Drive: 6 plays, 40 yards, 3:07.**

**Fourth quarter**

- NYJ – Chaz Schilens 5-yard pass from Mark Sanchez (pass failed), 7:20. Dolphins 27–9. **Drive: 13 plays, 94 yards, 5:39.**
- MIA – Dan Carpenter 42-yard field goal, 4:30. Dolphins 30–9. **Drive: 6 plays, 21 yards, 2:50.**

**Top passers**

- MIA – Matt Moore – 11/19, 131 yards, TD
- NYJ – Mark Sanchez – 28/54, 283 yards, TD, INT

**Top rushers**

- MIA – Reggie Bush – 14 rushes, 59 yards
- NYJ – Shonn Greene – 15 rushes, 77 yards

**Top receivers**

- MIA – Brian Hartline – 4 receptions, 41 yards
- NYJ – Clyde Gates – 7 receptions, 82 yards

With the win, the Dolphins improved to 4–3.

==== Week 9: at Indianapolis Colts ====
Week Nine: Miami Dolphins at Indianapolis Colts – Game summary

Quarter	1	2	3	4	Total
Dolphins	3	14	0	3	**20**
**Colts**	7	6	7	3	**23**

at Lucas Oil Stadium, Indianapolis, Indiana

- Date: November 4
- Game time: 1:00 p.m. EST
- Game weather: Played indoors (retractable roof closed)
- Game attendance: 66,479
- Referee: Tony Corrente
- TV announcers (CBS): Kevin Harlan and Solomon Wilcots

Game information

**First quarter**

- MIA – Dan Carpenter 37-yard field goal, 4:15. Dolphins 3–0. **Drive: 11 plays, 42 yards, 5:19.**
- IND – Reggie Wayne 9-yard pass from Andrew Luck (Adam Vinatieri kick), 0:47. Colts 7–3. **Drive: 9 plays, 80 yards, 3:28.**

**Second quarter**

- MIA – Charles Clay 31-yard pass from Ryan Tannehill (Dan Carpenter kick), 13:25. Dolphins 10–7. **Drive: 5 plays, 80 yards, 2:22.**
- IND – Adam Vinatieri 23-yard field goal, 9:37. Tied 10–10. **Drive: 8 plays, 75 yards, 3:48.**
- MIA – Reggie Bush 18-yard run (Dan Carpenter kick), 5:07. Dolphins 17–10. **Drive: 9 plays, 80 yards, 4:30.**
- IND – Adam Vinatieri 47-yard field goal, 0:07. Dolphins 17–13. **Drive: 10 plays, 58 yards, 1:07.**

**Third quarter**

- IND – T.Y. Hilton 36-yard pass from Andrew Luck (Adam Vinatieri kick), 1:49. Colts 20–17. **Drive: 9 plays, 82 yards, 4:47.**

**Fourth quarter**

- MIA – Dan Carpenter 31-yard field goal, 13:12. Tied 20–20. **Drive: 10 plays, 52 yards, 3:37.**
- IND – Adam Vinatieri 43-yard field goal, 5:58. Colts 23–20. **Drive: 13 plays, 69 yards, 7:14.**

**Top passers**

- MIA – Ryan Tannehill – 22/38, 290 yards, TD
- IND – Andrew Luck – 30/48, 433 yards, 2 TD

**Top rushers**

- MIA – Reggie Bush – 10 rushes, 41 yards, TD
- IND – Vick Ballard – 16 rushes, 60 yards

**Top receivers**

- MIA – Brian Hartline – 8 receptions, 107 yards
- IND – Donnie Avery – 5 receptions, 108 yards

With the loss, the Dolphins fell to 4–4.

==== Week 10: vs. Tennessee Titans ====
Week Ten: Tennessee Titans at Miami Dolphins – Game summary

Quarter	1	2	3	4	Total
**Titans**	14	10	7	6	**37**
Dolphins	0	3	0	0	**3**

at Sun Life Stadium, Miami Gardens, Florida

- Date: November 11
- Game time: 1:00 p.m. EST
- Game weather: 78 °F (26 °C), partly cloudy
- Game attendance: 60,165
- Referee: Walt Anderson
- TV announcers (CBS): Spero Dedes and Steve Tasker

Game information

**First quarter**

- TEN – Kendall Wright 9-yard pass from Jake Locker (Rob Bironas kick), 6:49. Titans 7–0. **Drive: 4 plays, 28 yards, 1:34.**
- TEN – Chris Johnson 17-yard run (Rob Bironas kick), 1:23. Titans 14–0. **Drive: 7 plays, 65 yards, 3:39.**

**Second quarter**

- TEN – Colin McCarthy 49-yard interception return (Rob Bironas kick), 14:05. Titans 21–0.
- MIA – Dan Carpenter 40-yard field goal, 9:03. Titans 21–3. **Drive: 10 plays, 58 yards, 5:02.**
- TEN – Rob Bironas 37-yard field goal, 0:27. Titans 24–3. **Drive: 4 plays, 4 yards, 1:24.**

**Third quarter**

- TEN – Jared Cook 26-yard pass from Jake Locker (Rob Bironas kick), 6:54. Titans 31–3. **Drive: 12 plays, 85 yards, 8:06.**

**Fourth quarter**

- TEN – Rob Bironas 38-yard field goal, 14:09. Titans 34–3. **Drive: 9 plays, 49 yards, 4:23.**
- TEN – Rob Bironas 53-yard field goal, 9:45. Titans 37–3. **Drive: 4 plays, 2 yards, 1:28.**

**Top passers**

- TEN – Jake Locker – 9/21, 122 yards, 2 TD
- MIA – Ryan Tannehill – 23/39, 217 yards, 3 INT

**Top rushers**

- TEN – Chris Johnson – 23 rushes, 126 yards, TD
- MIA – Daniel Thomas – 5 rushes, 21 yards

**Top receivers**

- TEN – Kenny Britt – 2 receptions, 36 yards
- MIA – Brian Hartline – 8 receptions, 79 yards

With the huge loss, the Dolphins fell to 4–5.

==== Week 11: at Buffalo Bills ====
Week Eleven: Miami Dolphins at Buffalo Bills – Game summary

Quarter	1	2	3	4	Total
Dolphins	7	0	0	7	**14**
**Bills**	13	6	0	0	**19**

at Ralph Wilson Stadium, Orchard Park, New York

- Date: November 15
- Game time: 8:20 p.m. EST
- Game weather: 35 °F (2 °C), clear and crisp
- Game attendance: 69,118
- Referee: Jeff Triplette
- TV announcers (NFLN): Brad Nessler, Mike Mayock and Alex Flanagan

Game information

**First quarter**

- BUF – Leodis McKelvin 79-yard punt return (Rian Lindell kick), 13:30. Bills 7–0.
- BUF – Rian Lindell 32-yard field goal, 5:07. Bills 10–0. **Drive: 8 plays, 38 yards, 3:52.**
- MIA – Marcus Thigpen 96-yard kickoff return (Dan Carpenter kick), 4:55. Bills 10–7.
- BUF – Rian Lindell 34-yard field goal, 0:40. Bills 13–7. **Drive: 8 plays, 60 yards, 4:15.**

**Second quarter**

- BUF – Rian Lindell 42-yard field goal, 8:57. Bills 16–7. **Drive: 8 plays, 64 yards, 3:57.**
- BUF – Rian Lindell 19-yard field goal, 0:00. Bills 19–7. **Drive: 8 plays, 52 yards, 1:58.**

**Third quarter**

- No scoring plays.

**Fourth quarter**

- MIA – Davone Bess 2-yard pass from Ryan Tannehill (Dan Carpenter kick), 8:42. Bills 19–14. **Drive: 11 plays, 81 yards, 5:21.**

**Top passers**

- MIA – Ryan Tannehill – 14/28, 141 yards, TD, 2 INT
- BUF – Ryan Fitzpatrick – 17/27, 168 yards

**Top rushers**

- MIA – Daniel Thomas – 12 rushes, 33 yards
- BUF – C. J. Spiller – 22 rushes, 91 yards

**Top receivers**

- MIA – Davone Bess – 6 receptions, 50 yards, TD
- BUF – Stevie Johnson – 6 receptions, 79 yards

==== Week 12: vs. Seattle Seahawks ====
Week Twelve: Seattle Seahawks at Miami Dolphins – Game summary

Quarter	1	2	3	4	Total
Seahawks	0	7	7	7	**21**
**Dolphins**	0	7	0	17	**24**

at Sun Life Stadium, Miami Gardens, Florida

- Date: November 25
- Game time: 1:00 p.m. EST
- Game weather: 72 °F (22 °C), sunny
- Game attendance: 51,295
- Referee: Clete Blakeman
- TV announcers (Fox): Chris Myers, Tim Ryan and Jaime Maggio

Game information

**First quarter**

- No scoring plays.

**Second quarter**

- MIA – Reggie Bush 21-yard run (Dan Carpenter kick), 5:13. Dolphins 7–0. **Drive: 8 plays, 94 yards, 4:52.**
- SEA – Anthony McCoy 3-yard pass from Russell Wilson (Stephen Hauschka kick), 0:29. Tied 7–7. **Drive: 9 plays, 80 yards, 4:44.**

**Third quarter**

- SEA – Michael Robinson 4-yard pass from Russell Wilson (Stephen Hauschka kick), 4:00. Seahawks 14–7. **Drive: 12 plays, 80 yards, 8:10.**

**Fourth quarter**

- MIA – Daniel Thomas 3-yard run (Dan Carpenter kick), 8:08. Tied 14–14. **Drive: 7 plays, 82 yards, 3:55.**
- SEA – Leon Washington 98-yard kickoff return (Stephen Hauschka kick), 7:54. Seahawks 21–14.
- MIA – Charles Clay 29-yard pass from Ryan Tannehill (Dan Carpenter kick), 5:13. Tied 21–21. **Drive: 6 plays, 80 yards, 2:41.**
- MIA – Dan Carpenter 43-yard field goal, 0:00. Dolphins 24–21. **Drive: 7 plays, 65 yards, 1:32.**

**Top passers**

- SEA – Russell Wilson – 21/27, 224 yards, 2 TD
- MIA – Ryan Tannehill – 18/26, 253 yards, TD, INT

**Top rushers**

- SEA – Marshawn Lynch – 19 rushes, 46 yards
- MIA – Reggie Bush – 14 rushes, 87 yards, TD

**Top receivers**

- SEA – Golden Tate – 4 receptions, 56 yards
- MIA – Davone Bess – 7 receptions, 129 yards

==== Week 13: vs. New England Patriots ====
Week Thirteen: New England Patriots at Miami Dolphins – Game summary

Quarter	1	2	3	4	Total
**Patriots**	7	10	0	6	**23**
Dolphins	3	7	0	6	**16**

at Sun Life Stadium, Miami Gardens, Florida

- Date: December 2
- Game time: 1:00 p.m. EST
- Game weather: 77 °F (25 °C), cloudy
- Game attendance: 72,114
- Referee: Ron Winter
- TV announcers (CBS): Greg Gumbel and Dan Dierdorf

Game information

**First quarter**

- NE – Stevan Ridley 1-yard run (Stephen Gostkowski kick), 11:53. Patriots 7–0. **Drive: 5 plays, 12 yards, 2:04.**
- MIA – Dan Carpenter 44-yard field goal, 0:01. Patriots 7–3. **Drive: 6 plays, 8 yards, 3:02.**

**Second quarter**

- NE – Wes Welker 7-yard pass from Tom Brady (Stephen Gostkowski kick), 9:21. Patriots 14–3. **Drive: 13 plays, 75 yards, 5:40.**
- NE – Stephen Gostkowski 43-yard field goal, 6:53. Patriots 17–3. **Drive: 4 plays, 0 yards, 1:01.**
- MIA – Ryan Tannehill 2-yard run (Dan Carpenter kick), 0:25. Patriots 17–10. **Drive: 12 plays, 80 yards, 6:28.**

**Third quarter**

- No scoring plays.

**Fourth quarter**

- NE – Stephen Gostkowski 32-yard field goal, 13:16. Patriots 20–10. **Drive: 13 plays, 66 yards, 4:36.**
- MIA – Dan Carpenter 33-yard field goal, 8:28. Patriots 20–13. **Drive: 12 plays, 65 yards, 4:48.**
- NE – Stephen Gostkowski 20-yard field goal, 1:10. Patriots 23–13. **Drive: 16 plays, 77 yards, 7:18.**
- MIA – Dan Carpenter 42-yard field goal, 0:31. Patriots 23–16. **Drive: 5 plays, 56 yards, 0:39.**

**Top passers**

- NE – Tom Brady – 24/40, 238 yards, TD, INT
- MIA – Ryan Tannehill – 13/29, 186 yards

**Top rushers**

- NE – Stevan Ridley – 19 rushes, 71 yards, TD
- MIA – Reggie Bush – 15 rushes, 64 yards

**Top receivers**

- NE – Wes Welker – 12 receptions, 103 yards, TD
- MIA – Brian Hartline – 5 receptions, 84 yards

==== Week 14: at San Francisco 49ers ====
Week Fourteen: Miami Dolphins at San Francisco 49ers – Game summary

Quarter	1	2	3	4	Total
Dolphins	0	3	3	7	**13**
**49ers**	0	6	7	14	**27**

at Candlestick Park, San Francisco, California

- Date: December 9
- Game time: 4:05 p.m. EST/1:05 p.m. PST
- Game weather: 62 °F (17 °C), sunny
- Game attendance: 69,732
- Referee: Mike Carey
- TV announcers (CBS): Greg Gumbel and Dan Dierdorf

Game information

**First quarter**

- No scoring plays.

**Second quarter**

- MIA – Dan Carpenter 28-yard field goal, 13:31. Dolphins 3–0. **Drive: 13 plays, 52 yards, 8:13.**
- SF – David Akers 30-yard field goal, 8:00. Tied 3–3. **Drive: 10 plays, 68 yards, 5:31.**
- SF – David Akers 37-yard field goal, 0:00. 49ers 6–3. **Drive: 9 plays, 61 yards, 3:15.**

**Third quarter**

- SF – Frank Gore 1-yard run (David Akers kick), 11:17. 49ers 13–3. **Drive: 2 plays, 9 yards, 0:48.**
- MIA – Dan Carpenter 53-yard field goal, 6:53. 49ers 13–6. **Drive: 6 plays, 14 yards, 4:24.**

**Fourth quarter**

- SF – Anthony Dixon 1-yard run (David Akers kick), 14:27. 49ers 20–6. **Drive: 13 plays, 83 yards, 7:26.**
- MIA – Anthony Fasano 3-yard pass from Ryan Tannehill (Dan Carpenter kick), 7:55. 49ers 20–13. **Drive: 13 plays, 75 yards, 6:23.**
- SF – Colin Kaepernick 50-yard run (David Akers kick), 2:10. 49ers 27–13. **Drive: 5 plays, 65 yards, 2:00.**

**Top passers**

- MIA – Ryan Tannehill – 17/33, 150 yards, TD
- SF – Colin Kaepernick – 18/23, 185 yards

**Top rushers**

- MIA – Reggie Bush – 14 rushes, 65 yards
- SF – Frank Gore – 12 rushes, 63 yards, TD

**Top receivers**

- MIA – Davone Bess – 5 receptions, 50 yards
- SF – Michael Crabtree – 9 receptions, 93 yards

==== Week 15: vs. Jacksonville Jaguars ====
Week Fifteen: Jacksonville Jaguars at Miami Dolphins – Game summary

Quarter	1	2	3	4	Total
Jaguars	3	0	0	0	**3**
**Dolphins**	3	7	6	8	**24**

at Sun Life Stadium, Miami Gardens, Florida

- Date: December 16
- Game time: 1:00 p.m. EST
- Game weather: 80 °F (27 °C), cloudy
- Game attendance: 53,667
- Referee: John Parry
- TV announcers (CBS): Marv Albert and Rich Gannon

Game information

**First quarter**

- JAX – Josh Scobee 37-yard field goal, 10:03. Jaguars 3–0. **Drive: 10 plays, 61 yards, 4:57.**
- MIA – Dan Carpenter 53-yard field goal, 6:26. Tied 3–3. **Drive: 7 plays, 43 yards, 3:37.**

**Second quarter**

- MIA – Jorvorskie Lane 4-yard pass from Ryan Tannehill (Dan Carpenter kick), 1:56. Dolphins 10–3. **Drive: 14 plays, 89 yards, 7:34.**

**Third quarter**

- MIA – Dan Carpenter 30-yard field goal, 5:35. Dolphins 13–3. **Drive: 5 plays, 60 yards, 2:54.**
- MIA – Dan Carpenter 31-yard field goal, 1:01. Dolphins 16–3. **Drive: 7 plays, 64 yards, 3:00.**

**Fourth quarter**

- MIA – Anthony Fasano 2-yard pass from Ryan Tannehill (Ryan Tannehill-Anthony Fasano pass), 3:12. Dolphins 24–3. **Drive: 14 plays, 85 yards, 9:01.**

**Top passers**

- JAX – Chad Henne – 18/34, 221 yards
- MIA – Ryan Tannehill – 22/28, 220 yards, 2 TD

**Top rushers**

- JAX – Montell Owens – 11 rushes, 47 yards
- MIA – Reggie Bush – 21 rushes, 104 yards

**Top receivers**

- JAX – Cecil Shorts – 6 receptions, 101 yards
- MIA – Brian Hartline – 5 receptions, 77 yards

==== Week 16: vs. Buffalo Bills ====
Week Sixteen: Buffalo Bills at Miami Dolphins – Game summary

Quarter	1	2	3	4	Total
Bills	0	3	0	7	**10**
**Dolphins**	7	7	10	0	**24**

at Sun Life Stadium, Miami Gardens, Florida

- Date: December 23
- Game time: 1:00 p.m. EST
- Game weather: 73 °F (23 °C), sunny
- Game attendance: 54,462
- Referee: Walt Anderson
- TV announcers (CBS): Don Criqui and Randy Cross

Game information

**First quarter**

- MIA – Reggie Bush 17-yard pass from Ryan Tannehill (Nate Kaeding kick), 2:54. Dolphins 7–0. **Drive: 9 plays, 62 yards, 4:18.**

**Second quarter**

- BUF – Rian Lindell 42-yard field goal, 9:48. Dolphins 7–3. **Drive: 6 plays, 65 yards, 2:47.**
- MIA – Reggie Bush 1-yard run (Nate Kaeding kick), 0:42. Dolphins 14–3. **Drive: 5 plays, 65 yards, 2:17.**

**Third quarter**

- MIA – Reggie Bush 12-yard pass from Ryan Tannehill (Nate Kaeding kick), 8:32. Dolphins 21–3. **Drive: 10 plays, 64 yards, 4:13.**
- MIA – Nate Kaeding 45-yard field goal, 4:17. Dolphins 24–3. **Drive: 4 plays, 2 yards, 1:18.**

**Fourth quarter**

- BUF – Brad Smith 2-yard pass from Ryan Fitzpatrick (Rian Lindell kick), 8:52. Dolphins 24–10. **Drive: 12 plays, 80 yards, 5:14.**

**Top passers**

- BUF – Ryan Fitzpatrick – 20/35, 240 yards, TD, INT
- MIA – Ryan Tannehill – 13/25, 130 yards, 2 TD

**Top rushers**

- BUF – C. J. Spiller – 22 rushes, 138 yards
- MIA – Lamar Miller – 10 rushes, 73 yards

**Top receivers**

- BUF – Dorin Dickerson – 4 receptions, 54 yards
- MIA – Reggie Bush – 4 receptions, 42 yards, 2 TD

With the win, the Dolphins improved to 7–8, but were officially eliminated from playoff contention, due to the Bengals' 13–10 win over the Steelers.

==== Week 17: at New England Patriots ====
Week Seventeen: Miami Dolphins at New England Patriots – Game summary

Quarter	1	2	3	4	Total
Dolphins	0	0	0	0	**0**
**Patriots**	7	14	0	7	**28**

at Gillette Stadium, Foxborough, Massachusetts

- Date: December 30
- Game time: 4:25 p.m. EST
- Game weather: 25 °F (−4 °C), partly cloudy and cold
- Game attendance: 68,756
- Referee: Jerome Boger
- TV announcers (CBS): Jim Nantz and Phil Simms

Game information

**First quarter**

- NE – Wes Welker 9-yard pass from Tom Brady (Stephen Gostkowski kick), 6:40. Patriots 7–0. **Drive: 2 plays, 28 yards, 0:35.**

**Second quarter**

- NE – Stevan Ridley 1-yard run (Stephen Gostkowski kick), 10:26. Patriots 14–0. **Drive: 13 plays, 92 yards, 7:28.**
- NE – Stevan Ridley 2-yard run (Stephen Gostkowski kick), 1:00. Patriots 21–0. **Drive: 14 plays, 69 yards, 5:24.**

**Third quarter**

- No scoring plays.

**Fourth quarter**

- NE – Rob Gronkowski 23-yard pass from Tom Brady (Stephen Gostkowski kick), 9:20. Patriots 28–0. **Drive: 6 plays, 47 yards, 2:27.**

**Top passers**

- MIA – Ryan Tannehill – 20/35, 235 yards, INT
- NE – Tom Brady – 22/36, 284 yards, 2 TD

**Top rushers**

- MIA – Reggie Bush – 8 rushes, 26 yards
- NE – Stevan Ridley – 20 rushes, 74 yards, 2 TD

**Top receivers**

- MIA – Brian Hartline – 5 receptions, 69 yards
- NE – Wes Welker – 8 receptions, 94 yards, TD

With this loss, the Dolphins finished the season with a 7–9 record. They were also swept by the Patriots for the third consecutive season.

== Standings ==
AFC East
	W	L	T	PCT	DIV	CONF	PF	PA	STK
^{(2)} New England Patriots	12	4	0	.750	6–0	11–1	557	331	W2
Miami Dolphins	7	9	0	.438	2–4	5–7	288	317	L1
New York Jets	6	10	0	.375	2–4	4–8	281	375	L3
Buffalo Bills	6	10	0	.375	2–4	5–7	344	435	W1

=== Conference standings ===
AFC
#	Team	Division	W	L	T	PCT	DIV	CONF	SOS	SOV	STK
Division winners
1	Denver Broncos	West	13	3	0	.813	6–0	10–2	.457	.385	W11
2 (Note: New England clinched the AFC's No. 2 seed over Houston based on a head-to-head victory.)	New England Patriots	East	12	4	0	.750	6–0	11–1	.496	.466	W2
3	Houston Texans	South	12	4	0	.750	5–1	10–2	.496	.432	L2
4 (Note: Baltimore clinched the AFC North title over Cincinnati based on a better divisional record (4–2 to 3–3).)	Baltimore Ravens	North	10	6	0	.625	4–2	8–4	.496	.438	L1
Wild cards
5	Indianapolis Colts	South	11	5	0	.688	4–2	8–4	.441	.403	W2
6	Cincinnati Bengals	North	10	6	0	.625	3–3	7–5	.438	.381	W3
Did not qualify for the postseason
7	Pittsburgh Steelers	North	8	8	0	.500	3–3	5–7	.465	.438	W1
8 (Note: San Diego finished with a better conference record than Miami (7–5 to 5–7).)	San Diego Chargers	West	7	9	0	.438	4–2	7–5	.457	.286	W2
9	Miami Dolphins	East	7	9	0	.438	2–4	5–7	.500	.415	L1
10 (Note: Tennessee finished ahead of New York Jets based on head-to-head victory.)	Tennessee Titans	South	6	10	0	.375	1–5	5–7	.512	.344	W1
11 (Note: New York Jets finished ahead of Buffalo in the AFC East based on record versus common opponents (5–7 to 3–9).)	New York Jets	East	6	10	0	.375	2–4	4–8	.512	.401	L3
12	Buffalo Bills	East	6	10	0	.375	2–4	5–7	.480	.281	W1
13	Cleveland Browns	North	5	11	0	.313	2–4	5–7	.508	.388	L3
14	Oakland Raiders	West	4	12	0	.250	2–4	4–8	.469	.219	L2
15 (Note: Jacksonville finished with a better conference record than Kansas City (2–10 to 0–12).)	Jacksonville Jaguars	South	2	14	0	.125	2–4	2–10	.539	.531	L5
16	Kansas City Chiefs	West	2	14	0	.125	0–6	0–12	.516	.438	L4
Tiebreakers (Note: When breaking ties for three or more teams under the NFL's rules, they are first broken within divisions, then comparing only the highest ranked remaining team from each division.)

== Staff ==
2012 Miami Dolphins staff
Front office: Chairman/managing general partner – Stephen Ross; Vice chairman/partner – Jorge Perez; Vice chairman – Don Shula; CEO – Mike Dee; General manager – Jeff Ireland; Assistant general manager – Brian Gaine; Executive vice president of football administration – Dawn Aponte; Director of college scouting – Chris Grier; Assistant director of pro scouting – Chris Shea; Head coaches: Head coach – Joe Philbin; Offensive coaches: Offensive coordinator – Mike Sherman; Assistant quarterbacks – Zac Taylor; Running backs – Jeff Nixon; Wide receivers – Ken O'Keefe; Assistant wide receivers – Phil McGeoghan; Tight ends – Dan Campbell; Offensive line – Jim Turner; Assistant offensive line – Chris Mosley; Offensive assistant – Ben Johnson	Defensive coaches: Defensive coordinator – Kevin Coyle; Defensive line – Kacy Rodgers; Linebackers – George Edwards; Defensive quality control/assistant linebackers – David Corrao; Defensive backs – Lou Anarumo; Assistant defensive backs – Blue Adams; Defensive assistant – Charlie Bullen; Special teams coaches: Special teams coordinator – Darren Rizzi; Assistant special teams – Dave Fipp; Strength and conditioning: Head strength and conditioning – Darren Krein; Assistant strength and conditioning – David Puloka

== Roster ==
2012 Miami Dolphins roster
Quarterbacks (QB): 7 Pat Devlin; 8 Matt Moore; 17 Ryan Tannehill; Running backs (RB): 22 Reggie Bush; 41 Jorvorskie Lane FB; 26 Lamar Miller; 34 Marcus Thigpen; Wide receivers (WR): 15 Davone Bess; 19 Armon Binns; 82 Brian Hartline; 86 Rishard Matthews; 14 Marlon Moore; Tight ends (TE): 84 Michael Egnew; 80 Anthony Fasano; 88 Jeron Mastrud; 87 Kyle Miller	Offensive linemen (OL): 73 Patrick Brown T; 75 Nate Garner G; 68 Richie Incognito G; 74 John Jerry G; 71 Jonathan Martin T; 51 Mike Pouncey C; 64 Josh Samuda C; 72 Will Yeatman T; Defensive linemen (DL): 78 Tony McDaniel DT; 98 Jared Odrick DE; 97 Kheeston Randall DT; 79 Derrick Shelby DE; 96 Paul Soliai DT; 94 Randy Starks DT; 91 Cameron Wake DE	Linebackers (LB): 56 Kevin Burnett OLB; 58 Karlos Dansby MLB; 59 Jonathan Freeny MLB; 57 Josh Kaddu OLB; 55 Koa Misi OLB; 53 Austin Spitler MLB; 93 Jason Trusnik OLB; 50 Olivier Vernon OLB; Defensive backs (DB): 29 Jonathon Amaya SS; 28 Nolan Carroll CB; 30 Chris Clemons SS; 36 Tyrone Culver SS; 20 Reshad Jones FS; 23 Bryan McCann CB; 32 Dimitri Patterson CB; 38 Julian Posey CB; 24 Sean Smith CB; 25 R. J. Stanford CB; 27 Jimmy Wilson FS; Special teams (ST): 92 John Denney LS; 2 Brandon Fields P; 9 Nate Kaeding K	Practice squad: 60 Jeff Adams T; 66 Chas Alecxih DT; 63 Chandler Burden G; 83 Jeff Fuller WR; 67 Andrew McDonald T; 21 De'Andre Presley CB; 40 Dion Turner CB; 85 Brian Tyms WR; Reserve: 5 Dan Carpenter K (IR); 42 Charles Clay FB (IR); 46 Jonas Gray RB (NF-Inj.); 77 Jake Long T (IR); 31 Richard Marshall CB (IR); 37 Kelcie McCray SS (IR); 33 Daniel Thomas RB (IR); Rookies in italics 53 active, 7 reserve, 8 practice squad

== Statistics ==
=== Team leaders ===
	Player(s)	Value
Passing yards	Ryan Tannehill	3294 Yards
Passing touchdowns	Ryan Tannehill	12 TDs
Rushing yards	Reggie Bush	986 Yards
Rushing touchdowns	Reggie Bush	6 TDs
Receiving yards	Brian Hartline	1083 Yards
Receiving touchdowns	Anthony Fasano	5 TDs
Points	Dan Carpenter	92 Points
Kickoff Return Yards	Marcus Thigpen	1040 Yards
Punt return Yards	Marcus Thigpen	316 Yards
Tackles	Karlos Dansby	101 Solo Tackles
Sacks	Cameron Wake	15.0 Sacks
Interceptions	Reshad Jones	4 INTs

final stat values through 16 weeks

=== League rankings ===
- Total Offense (YPG): 311.5 (27th)
- Points (PPG): 18.0 (27th)
- Passing (YPG): 198.9 (26th)
- Rushing (YPG): 112.6 (17th)
- Total Defense (YPG): 356.8 (21st)
- Points (PPG) : 19.8 (7th)
- Passing (YPG): 248.4 (27th)
- Rushing (YPG): 108.4 (13th)

final stat values through 17 weeks

== Notes ==
- ^{a} : On January 20, 2013 Richie Incognito replaced Baltimore Ravens' guard Marshal Yanda, who played in Super Bowl XLVII instead.
- ^{b} : On January 21, 2013 Randy Starks replaced an injured New England Patriots' defensive tackle Vince Wilfork.
- ^{c} : Because Vontae Davis did not meet a conditional amount of playing time throughout the season with the Indianapolis Colts, the late round draft pick was forfeited.
