= Mike Harris (cornerback) =

American football player (born 1989)

No. 20, 37
- Position: Cornerback

Personal information
- Born: January 5, 1989 (age 37); Miami, Florida, U.S.
- Listed height: 5 ft 10 in (1.78 m)
- Listed weight: 188 lb (85 kg)

Career information
- High school: South Miami
- College: Florida State
- NFL draft: 2012: 6th round, 176th overall pick

Career history
- Jacksonville Jaguars (2012−2013); Detroit Lions (2014)*; New York Giants (2014)
- * Offseason or practice squad member only

Career NFL statistics
- Total tackles: 113
- Sacks: 2
- Fumble recoveries: 1
- Interceptions: 2
- Stats at Pro Football Reference

Mike Harris (born January 5, 1989) is an American former professional football player who was a cornerback for the Jacksonville Jaguars and New York Giants of the National Football League (NFL). He was selected by the Jaguars in the sixth round of the 2012 NFL draft. He played college football for El Camino College before transferring to Florida State University.

== Professional career ==
=== Jacksonville Jaguars ===
Harris selected by the Jacksonville Jaguars in the sixth round (176th overall) of the 2012 NFL draft. He recorded both his first quarterback sack and first interception of his NFL career in the same game in a victory over the Tennessee Titans on November 25, 2012. On December 30, he recovered a blocked punt and returned it for a touchdown in a loss to the Titans. Harris was released by the Jaguars on August 24, 2014.

=== Detroit Lions ===
On October 8, 2014, the Detroit Lions signed Harris to their practice squad.

=== New York Giants ===
On October 29, 2014, the New York Giants signed Harris away from the Lions practice squad. On September 6, 2015, he was waived by the Giants.

== NFL career statistics ==
Legend
**Bold**	Career high

Year	Team	Games		Tackles					Interceptions					Fumbles			
Year	Team	GP	GS	Cmb	Solo	Ast	Sck	TFL	Int	Yds	TD	Lng	PD	FF	FR	Yds	TD
2012	JAX	15	**6**	**55**	**51**	4	**1.0**	2	**1**	0	0	0	**5**	0	0	0	0
2013	JAX	**16**	2	37	31	**6**	0.0	0	0	0	0	0	2	0	**1**	0	0
2014	NYG	5	1	21	20	1	**1.0**	**3**	**1**	**11**	0	**11**	2	0	0	0	0
		36	9	113	102	11	2.0	5	2	11	0	11	9	0	1	0	0
