= Jeris Pendleton =

American football player (born 1983)

No. 98, 61
- Position: Defensive tackle

Personal information
- Born: November 7, 1983 (age 42); Chicago, Illinois, U.S.
- Listed height: 6 ft 2 in (1.88 m)
- Listed weight: 328 lb (149 kg)

Career information
- High school: Dunbar (Chicago)
- College: Ashland
- NFL draft: 2012: 7th round, 228th overall pick

Career history
- Jacksonville Jaguars (2012); Dallas Cowboys (2013)*; Indianapolis Colts (2013–2015)
- * Offseason or practice squad member only

Career NFL statistics
- Total tackles: 3
- Stats at Pro Football Reference

Jeris Pendleton (born November 7, 1983) is an American former professional football player who was a defensive tackle in the National Football League (NFL). He played college football at Joliet Junior College before transferring to the Ashland Eagles. He was selected by the Jacksonville Jaguars in the seventh round of the 2012 NFL draft.

== College career ==
Pendleton was set to receive a scholarship to play football at Michigan State University but was unable to attend due to family obligations. He spent the next six years working different jobs before returning to football as a walk-on at Joliet Junior College in 2008. He later transferred to Ashland University.

== Professional career ==
Pre-draft measurables
Height	Weight	40-yard dash	10-yard split	20-yard split	20-yard shuttle	Three-cone drill	Vertical jump	Broad jump	Bench press
6 ft 2 in (1.88 m)	328 lb (149 kg)	4.98 s	1.72 s	2.96 s	4.49 s	7.90 s	30.0 in (0.76 m)	8 ft 0 in (2.44 m)	31 reps
All values from Pro Day

=== Jacksonville Jaguars ===
Pendleton was selected by the Jacksonville Jaguars in the seventh round with the 228th overall selection of the 2012 NFL draft. At 28 years of age, he was one of the oldest players ever drafted. He was also the first Ashland player to be drafted since Bill Overmyer was selected by the Philadelphia Eagles in the 1972 NFL draft.

Following the 2012 preseason, Pendleton earned a spot on the Jaguars active roster. Pendleton became the first Ashland player to make an NFL team since kicker Tim Seder, who was also a member of the Jaguars in 2002.

Pendleton was released on May 22, 2013.

=== Dallas Cowboys ===
On June 10, 2013, Pendleton signed with the Dallas Cowboys. On August 26, 2013, he was cut by the Cowboys.

=== Indianapolis Colts ===
On December 3, 2013, Pendleton was added to the Indianapolis Colts' practice squad. On December 26, he was promoted to the active roster and saw playing time during the Colts' regular season finale against the Jacksonville Jaguars. On August 7, 2014, Pendleton was placed on injured reserve due to a knee injury. Pendleton was signed to the Colts 90 man roster on June 30, 2015. On September 6, 2015, he was signed to the Colts' practice squad.
