= Russell Allen (American football) =

American football player (born 1986)

No. 50
- Position: Linebacker

Personal information
- Born: May 5, 1986 (age 40); Upland, California, U.S.
- Listed height: 6 ft 3 in (1.91 m)
- Listed weight: 238 lb (108 kg)

Career information
- High school: Vista (Vista, California)
- College: San Diego State
- NFL draft: 2009: undrafted

Career history
- Jacksonville Jaguars (2009–2013)

Career NFL statistics
- Total tackles: 331
- Sacks: 2
- Forced fumbles: 2
- Fumble recoveries: 3
- Interceptions: 1
- Stats at Pro Football Reference

Russell Allen (born May 5, 1986) is an American former professional football player who was a linebacker for the Jacksonville Jaguars of the National Football League (NFL) from 2009 to 2013. He played college football for the San Diego State Aztecs. Allen was signed as an undrafted free agent by the Jaguars in 2009. He suffered a career-ending stroke during a game in 2013.

== Professional career ==
Allen was signed as an undrafted free agent by the Jacksonville Jaguars on April 26, 2009.

On September 5, 2009, he became one of two undrafted rookies, the other being Julius Williams, to make the Jaguars opening day roster.

Allen was named starting weakside linebacker on October 11, 2009 against the Seattle Seahawks. During the 2009 season, Allen played in all 16 games, starting five.

Allen suffered a stroke on December 15, 2013 during a game against the Buffalo Bills. Allen was placed on injured reserve on December 19, 2013, ending his season. Doctors subsequently advised him to avoid playing again.

Allen was released by the Jaguars on April 17, 2014.

On April 22, 2014, he announced his retirement from the NFL at the age of 27.
