= Kheeston Randall =

American football player (born 1989)

No. 97
- Position: Defensive tackle

Personal information
- Born: May 7, 1990 (age 36); Beaumont, Texas, U.S.
- Listed height: 6 ft 5 in (1.96 m)
- Listed weight: 309 lb (140 kg)

Career information
- High school: Monsignor Kelly (Beaumont)
- College: Texas
- NFL draft: 2012: 7th round, 215th overall pick

Career history
- Miami Dolphins (2012); Cincinnati Bengals (2013); Minnesota Vikings (2014)*
- * Offseason or practice squad member only

Awards and highlights
- Second-team All-Big 12 (2011)

Career NFL statistics
- Total tackles: 8
- Stats at Pro Football Reference

Kheeston Randall (born May 7, 1990) is an American former professional football player who was a defensive tackle in the National Football League (NFL). He was a member of the Miami Dolphins, Cincinnati Bengals, and Minnesota Vikings. Prior to that he played college football for the Texas Longhorns

== Early life ==
Randall was born in Beaumont, Texas, and played high school football at Monsignor Kelly Catholic High School under assistant coach Frank Middleton, former NFL offensive guard. Randall was two-time all-state and led the team to a 9–1 record and a berth in the regional finals. He also played basketball and threw the shot put.

== College career ==
Randall attended the University of Texas at Austin from 2008 to 2011. During his career he started 35 of 47 games, recording 98 tackles and four sacks. During his freshman year, he saw play in eight games, but by his sophomore year he'd emerged as a starter, starting 10 games including the BCS Championship game against #1 Alabama. He started all 25 games during the 2010–2011 seasons. In 2010, he recorded five tackles for losses, 34 tackles, eight quarterback hurries and one sack and was named honorable mention All-Big 12. In 2011, he recorded 21 tackles for losses, 98 tackles (49 solo) and four sacks and was named first-team All-Big 12.

== Professional career ==
=== Miami Dolphins ===
Randall was selected by the Miami Dolphins in the seventh round of the 2012 NFL draft with the 215th overall pick. Randall played 12 games in 2012 but Miami released him before the start of the 2013 season.

=== Cincinnati Bengals ===
The Cincinnati Bengals signed Randall on November 5, 2013, to shore up depth following Geno Atkins' injury, but remained on the roster for only two weeks before being released.

=== Minnesota Vikings ===
In January 2014, Randall was signed by his former Defensive Coordinator, Mike Zimmer, to play for the Minnesota Vikings just one week after Zimmer took over as the head coach. He was released on August 25, 2014, before the start of the season.
