= Kyle Miller (American football) =

American football player (born 1988)

Mount Union Purple Raiders
- Title: Tight ends coach

Personal information
- Born: April 18, 1988 (age 38); Bowling Green, Ohio, U.S.
- Listed height: 6 ft 5 in (1.96 m)
- Listed weight: 257 lb (117 kg)

Career information
- High school: Elida (OH)
- College: Mount Union (2007–2010)
- NFL draft: 2011: undrafted

Career history

Playing
- Jacksonville Jaguars (2011)*; Indianapolis Colts (2012); Miami Dolphins (2012–2013); Atlanta Falcons (2014–2015)*; San Diego Chargers (2015)
- * Offseason or practice squad member only

Coaching
- Ohio Northern (2018) Tight ends coach; Mount Union (2019–2021) Tight ends coach & inside wide receivers coach; Mount Union (2022) Tight ends coach; Mount Union (2023) Special teams coordinator & tight ends coach; Mount Union (2024–present) Tight ends coach

Awards and highlights
- 3× first-team All-OAC (2009–2011)

Career NFL statistics
- Games played: 3
- Stats at Pro Football Reference

Kyle Miller (born April 18, 1988) is an American former professional football player who was a tight end in the National Football League (NFL). He was originally signed by the Jacksonville Jaguars as an undrafted free agent in 2011. He played college football for the Mount Union Purple Raiders. Miller has also played for the Indianapolis Colts, Miami Dolphins, Atlanta Falcons, and San Diego Chargers. He is the son of former NFL quarterback Mark Miller.

== Professional career ==
=== Jacksonville Jaguars ===
On July 26, 2011, Miller was signed as an undrafted free agent by the Jacksonville Jaguars. On September 3, 2011, he was waived by the Jaguars.

=== Indianapolis Colts ===
On April 3, 2012, Miller was signed by the Indianapolis Colts. On August 31, 2012, he was waived by the Colts. On September 1, 2012, he was signed to the Colts' practice squad. On November 12, 2012, Miller was promoted to the Colts' active roster. On November 19, 2012, he was waived by the Colts.

=== Miami Dolphins ===
On November 20, 2012, Miller was claimed off waivers by the Miami Dolphins. On August 31, 2013, he was cut by the Dolphins. On September 2, 2013, he was signed to the Dolphins' practice squad. On December 31, 2013, Miller signed a reserve/future contract with the Dolphins. On August 30, 2014, he was cut by the Dolphins.

=== Atlanta Falcons ===
On September 1, 2014, Miller was signed to the Atlanta Falcons' practice squad. On May 3, 2015, he was waived by the Falcons.

=== San Diego Chargers ===
On May 5, 2015, Miller was claimed off waivers by the San Diego Chargers. On September 15, 2015, he was waived by the Chargers. On September 24, 2015, Miller was re-signed by the Chargers. On September 29, 2015, he was waived again by the Chargers.
