= Montell Owens =

American football player (born 1984)

No. 24, 34
- Position: Fullback

Personal information
- Born: May 4, 1984 (age 42); Wilmington, Delaware, U.S.
- Listed height: 5 ft 10 in (1.78 m)
- Listed weight: 225 lb (102 kg)

Career information
- High school: Concord (Wilmington, Delaware)
- College: Maine
- NFL draft: 2006: undrafted

Career history
- Jacksonville Jaguars (2006–2012); Detroit Lions (2013–2014); Chicago Bears (2014)

Awards and highlights
- 2× Pro Bowl (2010, 2011)

Career NFL statistics
- Rushing attempts: 56
- Rushing yards: 292
- Rushing touchdowns: 3
- Receptions: 12
- Receiving yards: 132
- Stats at Pro Football Reference

Montell Ernest Owens (born May 4, 1984) is an American former professional football player who was a fullback in the National Football League (NFL). He played college football for the Maine Black Bears. Owens was signed by the Jacksonville Jaguars as an undrafted free agent in 2006. He also played for the Detroit Lions and Chicago Bears.

== Early life ==
Owens attended Concord High School in Wilmington, Delaware, and was a letterman in football, baseball, and track. As a student, he was a member of the National Honor Society and toured Europe with American Music Abroad. In football, Owens rushed for 1,100 yards and 20 touchdowns. Owens graduated from Concord High School in 2002.

== College career ==
Owens attended the University of Maine, where he was a four-year letterman who played in 38 games at tailback for the Maine Black Bears football team. In 2005, he established career highs with 184 carries for 779 yards and nine touchdowns as a senior. As a junior in 2004, he played in nine games and had 49 carries for 187 yards and two touchdowns. He played in nine games as a sophomore rushed for 32 yards on 15 carries. Owens majored in kinesiology and biology and minored in jazz performance.

== Professional career ==
=== Jacksonville Jaguars ===
After going undrafted in the 2006 NFL draft, Owens signed with the Jacksonville Jaguars on April 30, 2006. In 2009, he tied the single-season franchise record with 30 special teams tackles. Owens was selected as a first alternate for the 2010 Pro Bowl. He was selected to the 2011 Pro Bowl as a special teams player. In the Pro Bowl game, Owens recovered a fumble by Devin Hester on a kickoff and returned it for a touchdown. In the same game he caught a pass for a touchdown from Matt Cassel. He replaced New England's Matthew Slater as the special teams player on the AFC roster for the 2012 Pro Bowl. He was released on May 16, 2013.

Owens was attributed with the nickname of "Mowens" during his time with the Jaguars, the result of a group of die-hard fans contracting the name listed on his jersey "M. OWENS".

=== Detroit Lions ===
Owens was signed by the Detroit Lions on May 30, 2013. On October 31, 2013, he was activated off short-term injured reserve. Owens was placed on injured reserve on September 30, 2014.

=== Chicago Bears ===
On December 11, 2014, Owens was signed by the Chicago Bears.

=== Jaguars franchise records ===
- Most special teams tackles: 118
- Most special teams tackles in single season: 30 (2009)

== Other ==
He was inducted into the Delaware Sports Hall of Fame in 2019.
