= 2011 Jacksonville Jaguars season =

17th season in franchise history

- Owner: Wayne Weaver
- General manager: Gene Smith
- Head coach: Jack Del Rio (fired November 29; 3–8 record); Mel Tucker (interim; 2–3 record)
- Offensive coordinator: Dirk Koetter
- Defensive coordinator: Mel Tucker
- Home stadium: EverBank Field

Results
- Record: 5–11
- Division place: 3rd AFC South
- Playoffs: Did not qualify
- Pro Bowlers: RB Maurice Jones-Drew

The 2011 season was the Jacksonville Jaguars' 17th in the National Football League (NFL). It was also their ninth season under head coach Jack Del Rio, but he was fired on November 29 after going 3–8 in the team's first 11 games and replaced on an interim basis by defensive coordinator Mel Tucker. Del Rio finished his tenure in Jacksonville with an overall 69–73 record in the regular season and 1–2 in the playoffs. He was also just 4 wins shy of surpassing his predecessor, Tom Coughlin, as the winningest head coach in Jaguars history. The Jaguars had hoped to improve on their 8–8 record from 2010, but exceeded their loss total in Week 13, and were officially eliminated from postseason contention. With the 10th pick in the 2011 NFL draft, they selected quarterback Blaine Gabbert from the University of Missouri, and Gabbert would replace Luke McCown as the starting quarterback in Week 3.

The 2011 season saw a dramatic increase in production from the Jaguars defense. This was due in part to offseason acquisitions Dwight Lowery, Dawan Landry and Drew Coleman in the secondary; linebackers Clint Session and Paul Posluszny; and defensive linemen Matt Roth and John Chick. The development of players such as Terrance Knighton, Tyson Alualu, and Jeremy Mincey also helped improve the pass rush. Even after suffering a multitude of injuries, the Jaguars defense managed to finish with the sixth-ranked overall defense in the NFL, having finished 28th overall previous season. Jacksonville's offense, however, was not as efficient. The Jaguars finished last in the NFL in passing yards and total offensive yards gained in 2011.

== Offseason ==
=== Players added ===
Pos.	Player	2010 Team
CB	Drew Coleman	New York Jets
S	Dawan Landry	Baltimore Ravens
LB	Paul Posluszny	Buffalo Bills
DE	Matt Roth	Cleveland Browns
LB	Clint Session	Indianapolis Colts
G	Jason Spitz	Green Bay Packers

=== Players lost ===
Pos.	Player	2011 Team
QB	Todd Bouman	
S	Don Carey	Detroit Lions
S	Sean Considine	Carolina Panthers
LB	Justin Durant	Detroit Lions
QB	Trent Edwards	Oakland Raiders
QB	David Garrard	
DE	Derrick Harvey	Denver Broncos
G	Vince Manuwai	
LB	Kirk Morrison	Buffalo Bills
P	Adam Podlesh	Chicago Bears
WR	Mike Sims-Walker	St. Louis Rams

=== NFL draft ===
2011 Jacksonville Jaguars draft
Round	Pick	Player	Position	College	Notes
1	10	Blaine Gabbert	Quarterback	Missouri	
3	76	Will Rackley	Guard	Lehigh	
4	114	Cecil Shorts III	Wide receiver	Mount Union	
4	121	Chris Prosinski	Safety	Wyoming	
5	147	Rod Issac	Safety	Middle Tennessee	
Made roster † Pro Football Hall of Fame * Made at least one Pro Bowl during career

^{^[a]} The Jaguars acquired this first-round selection in a trade that sent a 2011 first-round and a second-round selection to the Washington Redskins.
^{^[b]} The Jaguars acquired this third-round selection in a trade that sent a 2011 third-round and a sixth-round selection to the San Francisco 49ers.
^{^[c]} The Jaguars acquired this fourth-round selection in a trade that sent a 2010 fifth-round selection to the New Orleans Saints.
The Jaguars traded their seventh-round selection to the Miami Dolphins in exchange for G Justin Smiley.

=== Undrafted free agents ===
Name	Position	College
Armon Binns	Wide receiver	Cincinnati
Cameron Bradfield	Tackle	Grand Valley State
Cole Brodie	Cornerback	South Dakota State
Greg Ellingson	Wide receiver	FIU
Matt Estrada	Safety	Northern Arizona
Tommy Gallarda	Tight end	Boise State
Wade Grayson	Guard	Arkansas
Brandon Harper	Guard	Duke
DuJuan Harris	Running back	Troy
T. J. Heath	Cornerback	Jacksonville State
Dontrelle Inman	Wide receiver	Virginia
Jalil Johnson	Cornerback	Jackson State
Andrew Lewis	Defensive tackle	Syracuse
Mike Lockley	Linebacker	Florida Atlantic
Scott Lutrus	Linebacker	UConn

== Staff ==
Jacksonville Jaguars 2011 staff
Front office: Chairman/CEO – Wayne Weaver; Senior vice president of football operations/general counsel – Paul Vance; General manager/senior vice president of player personnel – Gene Smith; Director of football administration – Tim Walsh; Director of player personnel – Terry McDonough; Assistant director of pro personnel – Louis Clark; Assistant director of college personnel – Tim Mingey; Head coaches: Head coach – Jack Del Rio; Offensive coaches: Offensive coordinator – Dirk Koetter; Quarterbacks – Mike Sheppard; Running backs – Earnest Byner; Wide receivers – Johnny Cox; Tight ends – Rob Boras; Offensive line – Andy Heck; Assistant offensive line – Ron Heller; Offensive quality control – Matt Griffin	Defensive coaches: Interim head coach/defensive coordinator – Mel Tucker; Defensive line – Joe Cullen; Assistant defensive line – Paul Spicer; Linebackers – Mark Duffner; Defensive backs – Cory Undlin; Assistant defensive backs – Thom Kaumeyer; Defensive quality control – Brandon Blaney; Special teams coaches: Special teams coordinator – Russ Purnell; Assistant special teams – Craig Aukerman; Assistant special teams – Nate Kaczor; Strength and conditioning: Strength and conditioning – Luke Richesson; Assistant strength and conditioning – Jason George; Strength staff assistant – Mike Eubanks; Strength staff assistant – Anthony Lomando

== Final roster ==
2011 Jacksonville Jaguars roster
Quarterbacks (QB): 11 Blaine Gabbert; 13 Dan LeFevour; 12 Luke McCown; Running backs (RB): 44 Brock Bolen FB; 40 DuJuan Harris; 33 Greg Jones FB; 32 Maurice Jones-Drew; 35 Deji Karim; 24 Montell Owens; Wide receivers (WR): 87 Jarett Dillard; 81 Kassim Osgood; 15 Taylor Price; 84 Cecil Shorts KR; 80 Mike Thomas PR; 17 Chastin West; Tight ends (TE): 83 Colin Cloherty; 89 Marcedes Lewis; 88 Zach Potter	Offensive linemen (OL): 76 Daniel Baldridge T; 78 Cameron Bradfield T; 62 John Estes C; 63 Brad Meester C; 75 Eugene Monroe T; 77 Uche Nwaneri G; 65 Will Rackley G; 70 William Robinson T; 67 Jason Spitz G/C; 68 Guy Whimper T; Defensive linemen (DL): 93 Tyson Alualu DT; 98 Nate Collins DT; 69 Leger Douzable DE; 95 Corvey Irvin DT; 96 Terrance Knighton DT; 94 Jeremy Mincey DE; 99 C. J. Mosley DT; 91 George Selvie DE	Linebackers (LB): 50 Russell Allen OLB; 58 Stephen Franklin OLB; 59 Jammie Kirlew OLB; 51 Paul Posluszny MLB; 52 Daryl Smith OLB; Defensive backs (DB): 38 C. C. Brown SS; 30 Drew Coleman CB; 20 David Jones CB; 26 Dawan Landry FS; 25 Dwight Lowery SS; 34 Trumaine McBride CB; 41 Akwasi Owusu-Ansah SS; 22 Kevin Rutland CB; 37 Morgan Trent CB; Special teams (ST): 48 Jeremy Cain LS; 2 Nick Harris P; 10 Josh Scobee K	Reserve: 56 Kyle Bosworth OLB (IR); 73 Eben Britton T (IR); 97 John Chick DE (IR); 21 Derek Cox CB (IR); 36 Courtney Greene SS (IR); 72 Kevin Haslam T/G (IR); 28 T. J. Heath CB (IR); -- Rod Issac SS (IR); 23 Rashad Jennings RB (IR); 74 Aaron Kampman DE (IR); 92 Austen Lane DE (IR); -- Darcel McBath FS (IR); 27 Rashean Mathis CB (IR); 29 William Middleton CB (IR); 86 Zach Miller TE (IR); 53 Aaron Morgan OLB (IR); 39 Richard Murphy RB (IR); 42 Chris Prosinski SS (IR); 18 Brian Robiskie WR (IR); 90 Matt Roth DE (IR); 85 Martin Rucker TE (IR); 55 Clint Session OLB (IR); -- D'Anthony Smith DT (IR); 43 Terrell Whitehead FS (IR); 31 Ashton Youboty CB (IR); Rookies in italics 53 active, 25 reserve, 0 practice squad

== Preseason ==
Week	Date	Opponent	Result	Record	Venue	Recap
1	August 11	at New England Patriots	L 12–47	0–1	Gillette Stadium	Recap
2	August 19	Atlanta Falcons	W 15–13	1–1	EverBank Field	Recap
3	August 27	at Buffalo Bills	L 32–35 (OT)	1–2	Ralph Wilson Stadium	Recap
4	September 1	St. Louis Rams	L 17–24	1–3	EverBank Field	Recap

== Regular season ==
=== Schedule ===
Week	Date	Opponent	Result	Record	Venue	Recap
1	September 11	**Tennessee Titans**	**W** 16–14	1–0	EverBank Field	Recap
2	September 18	at New York Jets	**L** 3–32	1–1	MetLife Stadium	Recap
3	September 25	at Carolina Panthers	**L** 10–16	1–2	Bank of America Stadium	Recap
4	October 2	New Orleans Saints	**L** 10–23	1–3	EverBank Field	Recap
5	October 9	Cincinnati Bengals	**L** 20–30	1–4	EverBank Field	Recap
6	October 16	at Pittsburgh Steelers	**L** 13–17	1–5	Heinz Field	Recap
7	October 24	Baltimore Ravens	**W** 12–7	2–5	EverBank Field	Recap
8	October 30	at **Houston Texans**	**L** 14–24	2–6	Reliant Stadium	Recap
9	Bye					
10	November 13	at **Indianapolis Colts**	**W** 17–3	3–6	Lucas Oil Stadium	Recap
11	November 20	at Cleveland Browns	**L** 10–14	3–7	Cleveland Browns Stadium	Recap
12	November 27	**Houston Texans**	**L** 13–20	3–8	EverBank Field	Recap
13	December 5	San Diego Chargers	**L** 14–38	3–9	EverBank Field	Recap
14	December 11	Tampa Bay Buccaneers	**W** 41–14	4–9	EverBank Field	Recap
15	December 15	at Atlanta Falcons	**L** 14–41	4–10	Georgia Dome	Recap
16	December 24	at **Tennessee Titans**	**L** 17–23	4–11	LP Field	Recap
17	January 1	**Indianapolis Colts**	**W** 19–13	5–11	EverBank Field	Recap

Note: Intra-division opponents are in bold text.

=== Game summaries ===
==== Week 1: vs. Tennessee Titans ====
Week One: Tennessee Titans at Jacksonville Jaguars – Game summary

Quarter	1	2	3	4	Total
Titans	0	0	7	7	**14**
**Jaguars**	7	3	3	3	**16**

at EverBank Field, Jacksonville, Florida

- Date: September 11, 2011
- Game time: 1:00 p.m. EDT
- Game weather: 87 °F (31 °C)
- Game attendance: 61,619
- Referee: Mike Carey
- TV announcers (CBS): Ian Eagle and Dan Fouts
- Game Recap, Game Book

Game information

**First quarter**

- JAC – Maurice Jones-Drew 21-yard run (Josh Scobee kick), 6:49. Jaguars 7–0. **Drive: 11 plays, 63 yards, 6:10.**

**Second quarter**

- JAC – Josh Scobee 48-yard field goal, 5:55. Jaguars 10–0. **Drive: 12 plays, 50 yards, 6:50.**

**Third quarter**

- JAC – Josh Scobee 21-yard field goal, 2:33. Jaguars 13–0. **Drive: 13 plays, 61 yards, 7:47.**
- TEN – Kenny Britt 80-yard pass from Matt Hasselbeck (Rob Bironas kick), 2:18. Jaguars 13–7. **Drive: 1 play, 80 yards, 0:15.**

**Fourth quarter**

- JAC – Josh Scobee 45-yard field goal, 12:22. Jaguars 16–7. **Drive: 11 plays, 54 yards, 4:56.**
- TEN – Kenny Britt 2-yard pass from Matt Hasselbeck (Rob Bironas kick), 3:34. Jaguars 16–14. **Drive: 12 plays, 80 yards, 5:42.**

**Top passers**

- TEN – Matt Hasselbeck – 21/34, 263 yards, 2 TD, INT
- JAC – Luke McCown – 17/24, 175 yards

Top rushers'

- TEN – Chris Johnson – 9 rushes, 24 yards
- JAC – Maurice Jones-Drew – 24 rushes, 97 yards, TD

**Top receivers**

- TEN – Kenny Britt – 5 receptions, 136 yards, 2 TD
- JAC – Mike Thomas – 8 receptions, 55 yards

**Top tacklers**

- TEN – Barrett Ruud – 8 tackles, 6 assists
- JAC – Dawan Landry – 6 tackles, 2 assists

==== Week 2: at New York Jets ====
Week Two: Jacksonville Jaguars at New York Jets – Game summary

Quarter	1	2	3	4	Total
Jaguars	3	0	0	0	**3**
**Jets**	9	6	14	3	**32**

at MetLife Stadium, East Rutherford, New Jersey

- Date: September 18, 2011
- Game time: 1:00 p.m. EDT
- Game weather: Clear, 66 °F (19 °C)
- Game attendance: 78,834
- Referee: Scott Green
- TV announcers (CBS): Greg Gumbel and Dan Dierdorf
- Game Recap, Game Book

Game information

**First quarter**

- NYJ – Santonio Holmes 17-yard pass from Mark Sanchez (Nick Folk kick), 11:37. Jets 7–0. **Drive: 6 plays, 65 yards, 3:23.**
- NYJ – Luke McCown sacked in end zone by Muhammad Wilkerson for a safety, 10:33. Jets 9–0.
- JAC – Josh Scobee 55-yard field goal, 3:02. Jets 9–3. **Drive: 6 plays, 20 yards, 2:52.**

**Second quarter**

- NYJ – Nick Folk 38-yard field goal, 13:28. Jets 12–3. **Drive: 8 plays, 39 yards, 4:34.**
- NYJ – Nick Folk 45-yard field goal, 0:26. Jets 15–3. **Drive: 4 plays, 1 yard, 0:54.**

**Third quarter**

- NYJ – Dustin Keller 11-yard pass from Matt Sanchez (Nick Folk kick), 3:50. Jets 22–3. **Drive: 8 plays, 92 yards, 5:18.**
- NYJ – Shonn Greene 1-yard run (Nick Folk kick), 1:30. Jets 29–3. **Drive: 2 plays, 1 yard, 0:38.**

**Fourth quarter**

- NYJ – Nick Folk 23-yard field goal, 14:03. Jets 32–3. **Drive: 6 plays, 13 yards, 2:18.**

**Top passers**

- JAC – Luke McCown – 6/19, 59 yards, 4 INT
- NYJ – Mark Sanchez – 17/24, 182 yards, 2 TD, 2 INT

**Top rushers**

- JAC – Maurice Jones-Drew – 18 rushes, 88 yards
- NYJ – Shonn Greene – 16 rushes, 49 yards

**Top receivers**

- JAC – Mike Thomas – 3 receptions, 29 yards
- NYJ – Dustin Keller – 6 receptions, 101 yards

**Top tacklers**

- JAC – Paul Posluszny – 4 tackles, 4 assists
- NYJ – Mike DeVito – 5 tackles

==== Week 3: at Carolina Panthers ====
Week Three: Jacksonville Jaguars at Carolina Panthers – Game summary

Quarter	1	2	3	4	Total
Jaguars	0	10	0	0	**10**
**Panthers**	2	3	3	8	**16**

at Bank of America Stadium, Charlotte, North Carolina

- Date: September 25, 2011
- Game time: 1:00 p.m. EDT
- Game weather: Cloudy, 75 °F (24 °C)
- Game attendance: 71,704
- Referee: Bill Leavy
- TV announcers (CBS): Spero Dedes and Steve Beuerlein
- Recap, Game Book

Game information

**First quarter**

- CAR – Blaine Gabbert sacked in end zone by Greg Hardy for a safety, 7:33. Panthers 2–0.

**Second quarter**

- CAR – Olindo Mare 35-yard field goal, 14:12. Panthers 5–0. **Drive: 7 plays, 32 yards, 3:11.**
- JAC – Josh Scobee 53-yard field goal, 7:41. Panthers 5–3. **Drive: 12 plays, 45 yards, 6:31.**
- JAC – Mike Thomas 36-yard pass from Blaine Gabbert (Josh Scobee kick), 0:00. Jaguars 10–5. **Drive: 3 plays, 77 yards, 0:53.**

**Third quarter**

- CAR – Olindo Mare 32-yard field goal, 2:24. Jaguars 10–8. **Drive: 7 plays, 24 yards, 4:07.**

**Fourth quarter**

- CAR – Greg Olsen 16-yard pass from Cam Newton (pass succeeded), 4:20. Panthers 16–10. **Drive: 5 plays, 55 yards, 2:24.**

**Top passers**

- JAC – Blaine Gabbert – 12/21, 139 yards, TD, INT
- CAR – Cam Newton – 18/34, 158, TD

**Top rushers**

- JAC – Maurice Jones-Drew – 24 rushes, 122 yards
- CAR – Jonathan Stewart – 10 rushes, 59 yards

**Top receivers**

- JAC – Mike Thomas – 4 receptions, 55 yards, TD
- CAR – Greg Olsen – 7 receptions, 57 yards, TD

**Top tacklers**

- JAC – Daryl Smith – 5 tackles, 4 assists
- CAR – James Anderson – 8 tackles, 1 assist

==== Week 4: vs. New Orleans Saints ====
Week Four: New Orleans Saints at Jacksonville Jaguars – Game summary

Quarter	1	2	3	4	Total
**Saints**	7	7	6	3	**23**
Jaguars	0	10	0	0	**10**

at EverBank Field, Jacksonville, Florida

- Date: October 2, 2011
- Game time: 1:00 p.m. EDT
- Game weather: 71 °F (22 °C)
- Game attendance: 62,471
- Referee: Ed Hochuli
- TV announcers (Fox): Sam Rosen and Chad Pennington
- Recap, Game Book

Game information

**First quarter**

- NO – Jed Collins 1-yard run (John Kasay kick), 7:59. Saints 7–0. **Drive: 9 plays, 62 yards, 4:49.**
- NO – Jimmy Graham 1-yard pass from Drew Brees (John Kasay kick), 12:37. Saints 14–0. **Drive: 12 plays, 96 yards, 6:24.**

**Second quarter**

- JAC – Zach Miller 14-yard pass from Blaine Gabbert (Josh Scobee kick), 7:29. Saints 14–7. **Drive: 12 plays, 80 yards, 5:08.**
- JAC – Josh Scobee 31-yard field goal, 0:34. Saints 14–10. **Drive: 4 plays, 0 yards, 0:18.**

**Third quarter**

- NO – John Kasay 38-yard field goal, 10:45. Saints 17–10. **Drive: 9 plays, 60 yards, 4:15.**
- NO – John Kasay 39-yard field goal, 4:11. Saints 20–10. **Drive: 10 plays, 47 yards, 4:55.**

**Fourth quarter**

- NO – John Kasay 21-yard field goal, 12:46. Saints 23–10. **Drive: 11 plays, 60 yards, 5:24.**

**Top passers**

- NO – Drew Brees – 31/44, 351 yards, TD, 2 INT
- JAC – Blaine Gabbert – 16/42, 196 yards, TD, INT

**Top rushers**

- NO – Darren Sproles – 7 rushes, 75 yards
- JAC – Maurice Jones-Drew – 11 rushes, 84 yards

**Top receivers**

- NO – Jimmy Graham – 10 receptions, 132 yards, TD
- JAC – Mike Thomas – 11 receptions, 73 yards

**Top tacklers**

- NO – Roman Harper – 5 tackles, 3 assists, 1 sack
- JAC – Paul Posluszny – 9 tackles, 4 assists, 1 sack

==== Week 5: vs. Cincinnati Bengals ====
Week Five: Cincinnati Bengals at Jacksonville Jaguars – Game summary

Quarter	1	2	3	4	Total
**Bengals**	7	6	0	17	**30**
Jaguars	7	6	0	7	**20**

at EverBank Field, Jacksonville, Florida

- Date: October 9, 2011
- Game time: 1:00 p.m. EDT
- Game weather: 79 °F (26 °C)
- Game attendance: 61,799
- Referee: Alberto Riveron
- TV announcers (CBS): Bill Macatee and Steve Tasker
- Recap, Game Book

Game information

**First quarter**

- JAC – Maurice Jones-Drew 6-yard run (Josh Scobee kick), Jaguars 7–0. **Drive: 10 plays, 80 yards, 5:25.**
- CIN – A. J. Green 37-yard pass from Andy Dalton (Mike Nugent kick), Tied 7–7. **Drive: 12 plays, 69 yards, 6:18.**

**Second quarter**

- JAC – Josh Scobee 19-yard field goal, Jaguars 10–7. **Drive: 4 plays, 1 yard, 1:33.**
- JAC – Josh Scobee 20-yard field goal, Jaguars 13–7. **Drive: 8 plays, 48 yards, 3:08.**
- CIN – Jermaine Gresham 37-yard pass from Andy Dalton (kick failed), Tied 13–13. **Drive: 10 plays, 52 yards, 3:42.**

**Third quarter**

- No scoring plays.

**Fourth quarter**

- CIN – Mike Nugent 47-yard field goal, Bengals 16–13. **Drive: 4 plays, 8 yards, 1:26.**
- JAC – Jason Hill 74-yard pass from Blaine Gabbert (Josh Scobee kick), Jaguars 20–16. **Drive: 3 plays, 80 yards, 1:17.**
- CIN – Bernard Scott 2-yard run (Mike Nugent kick), Bengals 23–20. **Drive: 7 plays, 23 yards, 3:18.**
- CIN – Geno Atkins 10-yard fumble return (Mike Nugent kick), Bengals 30–20.

**Top passers**

- CIN – Andy Dalton – 21/33, 179 yards, 2 TD, INT
- JAC – Blaine Gabbert – 15/28, 221 yards, TD

**Top rushers**

- CIN – Cedric Benson – 24 rushes, 53 yards
- JAC – Maurice Jones-Drew – 19 rushes, 85 yards, TD

**Top receivers**

- CIN – A. J. Green – 5 receptions, 90 yards, TD
- JAC – Jason Hill – 5 receptions, 118 yards, TD

**Top tacklers**

- CIN – Rey Maualuga – 3 tackles, 3 assists, 1 pass defended
- JAC – Daryl Smith – 7 tackles, 2 assists, 1 pass defended

The loss ended the Jaguars' seven-game home winning streak against the Bengals and marked their first home defeat to Cincinnati since the 1995 season.

==== Week 6: at Pittsburgh Steelers ====
Week Six: Jacksonville Jaguars at Pittsburgh Steelers – Game summary

Quarter	1	2	3	4	Total
Jaguars	0	3	7	3	**13**
**Steelers**	7	10	0	0	**17**

at Heinz Field, Pittsburgh, Pennsylvania

- Date: October 16, 2011
- Game time: 1:00 p.m. EDT
- Game weather: Cloudy, 58 °F (14 °C)
- Game attendance: 62,934
- Referee: Ron Winter
- TV announcers (CBS): Ian Eagle and Dan Fouts
- Recap, Game Book

Game information

**First quarter**

- PIT – Rashard Mendenhall 8-yard run (Shaun Suisham kick), 4:23. Steelers 7–0. **Drive: 10 plays, 87 yards, 5:57.**

**Second quarter**

- PIT – Mike Wallace 28-yard pass from Ben Roethlisberger (Shaun Suisham kick), 13:40. Steelers 14–0. **Drive: 8 plays, 72 yards, 4:15.**
- PIT – Shaun Suisham 21-yard field goal, 10:58.. Steelers 17–0. **Drive: 5 plays, 69 yard, 1:25.**
- JAC – Josh Scobee 46-yard field goal, 8:44. Steelers 17–3. **Drive: 8 plays, 47 yard, 2:14.**

**Third quarter**

- JAC – Jason Hill 14-yard pass from Blaine Gabbert (Josh Scobee kick), 1:46. Steelers 17–10. **Drive: 17 plays, 80 yards, 9:35.**

**Fourth quarter**

- JAC – Josh Scobee 45-yard field goal, 4:17. Steelers 17–13. **Drive: 5 plays, 25 yards, 2:56.**

**Top passers**

- JAC – Blaine Gabbert – 12/26, 109 yards, TD
- PIT – Ben Roethlisberger – 12/23, 200 yards, TD

**Top rushers**

- JAC – Maurice Jones-Drew – 22 rushes, 96 yards
- PIT – Rashard Mendenhall – 23 rushes, 146 yards, TD

**Top receivers**

- JAC – Mike Thomas – 4 receptions, 36 yards
- PIT – Mike Wallace – 2 receptions, 76 yards, TD

**Top tacklers**

- JAC – Paul Posluszny – 9 tackles, 7 assists
- PIT – James Farrior – 6 tackles, 5 assists, 1 sack

==== Week 7: vs. Baltimore Ravens ====
Week Seven: Baltimore Ravens at Jacksonville Jaguars – Game summary

Quarter	1	2	3	4	Total
Ravens	0	0	0	7	**7**
**Jaguars**	3	3	3	3	**12**

at EverBank Field, Jacksonville, Florida

- Date: October 24, 2011
- Game time: 8:30 p.m. EDT
- Game weather: 60 °F (16 °C)
- Game attendance: 62,976
- Referee: Carl Cheffers
- TV announcers (ESPN): Mike Tirico, Ron Jaworski, Jon Gruden, and Sal Paolantonio
- Recap, Game Book

Game information

**First quarter**

- JAC – Josh Scobee 54-yard field goal, 1:42. Jaguars 3–0. **Drive: 4 plays, −3 yards, 1:22.**

**Second quarter**

- JAC – Josh Scobee 54-yard field goal, 5:58. Jaguars 6–0. **Drive: 6 plays, 38 yards, 2:40.**

**Third quarter**

- JAC – Josh Scobee 22-yard field goal, 6:30. Jaguars 9–0. **Drive: 17 plays, 76 yards, 8:30.**

**Fourth quarter**

- BAL – Anquan Boldin 5-yard pass from Joe Flacco (Billy Cundiff kick), 2:02. Jaguars 9–7. **Drive: 13 plays, 90 yards, 3:20.**
- JAC – Josh Scobee 51-yard field goal, 1:43. Jaguars 12–7. **Drive: 4 plays, 4 yards, 0:19.**

**Top passers**

- BAL – Joe Flacco – 21/38, 137 yards, TD, INT
- JAC – Blaine Gabbert – 9/20, 93 yards

**Top rushers**

- BAL – Ray Rice – 8 rushes, 28 yards
- JAC – Maurice Jones-Drew – 30 rushes, 105 yards

**Top receivers**

- BAL – Anquan Boldin – 4 receptions, 40 yards, TD
- JAC – Jason Hill – 4 receptions, 62 yards

**Top tacklers**

- BAL – Ray Lewis – 6 tackles, 2 assists
- JAC – Daryl Smith – 6 tackles, 1 sack, 1 forced fumble

==== Week 8: at Houston Texans ====
Week Eight: Jacksonville Jaguars at Houston Texans – Game summary

Quarter	1	2	3	4	Total
Jaguars	0	7	0	7	**14**
**Texans**	7	0	7	10	**24**

at Reliant Stadium, Houston, Texas

- Date: October 30, 2011
- Game time: 12:00 p.m. CDT
- Game weather: Sunny, 68 °F (20 °C)
- Game attendance: 71,412
- Referee: Scott Green
- TV announcers (CBS): Marv Albert and Rich Gannon
- Recap, Game Book

Game information

**First quarter**

- HOU – Matt Schaub 2-yard run (Neil Rackers kick), 8:21. Texans 7–0. **Drive: 12 plays, 80 yards, 6:39.**

**Second quarter**

- JAC – Jason Hill 5-yard pass from Blaine Gabbert (Josh Scobee kick), 5:41. Tied 7–7. **Drive: 2 plays, 8 yards, 0:47.**

**Third quarter**

- HOU – Joel Dreessen 6-yard pass from Matt Schaub (Neil Rackers kick), 9:10. Texans 14–7. **Drive: 9 plays, 44 yards, 4:07.**

**Fourth quarter**

- HOU – Arian Foster 4-yard run (Neil Rackers kick), 12:32. Texans 21–7. **Drive: 5 plays, 40 yards, 2:21.**
- JAC – Maurice Jones-Drew 2-yard run (Josh Scobee kick), 5:15. Texans 21–14. **Drive: 7 plays, 26 yards, 3:58.**
- HOU – Neil Rackers 39-yard field goal, 0:18. Texans 24–14. **Drive: 9 plays, 59 yards, 4:57.**

**Top passers**

- JAC – Blaine Gabbert – 10/30, 97 yards, TD, 2 INT
- HOU – Matt Schaub – 16/30, 225 yards, TD

**Top rushers**

- JAC – Maurice Jones-Drew – 18 rushes, 63 yards, TD
- HOU – Arian Foster – 33 rushes, 112 yards, TD

**Top receivers**

- JAC – Marcedes Lewis – 4 receptions, 45 yards
- HOU – Kevin Walter – 5 receptions, 70 yards

**Top tacklers**

- JAC – Dawan Landry – 9 tackles, 2 assists, 1 forced fumble
- HOU – Brian Cushing – 3 tackles, 4 assists, 1 pass defended, INT

==== Week 10: at Indianapolis Colts ====
Week Ten: Jacksonville Jaguars at Indianapolis Colts – Game summary

Quarter	1	2	3	4	Total
**Jaguars**	3	0	7	7	**17**
Colts	0	3	0	0	**3**

at Lucas Oil Stadium, Indianapolis, Indiana

- Date: November 13, 2011
- Game time: 1:00 p.m. EST
- Game weather: None (retractable roof closed)
- Game attendance: 64,619
- Referee: Jeff Triplette
- TV announcers (CBS): Spero Dedes and Steve Beuerlein
- Game Recap, Game Book

Game information

**First quarter**

- JAC – Josh Scobee 44-yard field goal, 2:44. Jaguars 3–0. **Drive: 8 plays, 35 yards, 4:44.**

**Second quarter**

- IND – Adam Vinatieri 42-yard field goal, 14:20. Tied 3–3. **Drive: 8 plays, 56 yards, 3:24.**

**Third quarter**

- JAC – Jarrett Dillard 11-yard pass from Blaine Gabbert (Josh Scobee kick), 1:49. Jaguars 10–3. **Drive: 16 plays, 86 yards, 9:40.**

**Fourth quarter**

- JAC – Maurice Jones-Drew 3-yard run (Josh Scobee kick), 3:52. Jaguars 17–3. **Drive: 3 plays, 8 yards, 0:56.**

**Top passers**

- JAC – Blaine Gabbert – 14/21, 118 yards, TD, INT
- IND – Curtis Painter – 13/19, 94 yards, 2 INT

**Top rushers**

- JAC – Maurice Jones-Drew – 25 rushes, 114 yards, TD
- IND – Donald Brown – 14 rushes, 53 yards

**Top receivers**

- JAC – Chastin West – 3 receptions, 39 yards
- IND – Jacob Tamme – 6 receptions, 75 yards

**Top tacklers**

- JAC – Daryl Smith – 5 tackles, 5 assists, 1 pass defended
- IND – David Caldwell – 4 tackles, 6 assists

==== Week 11: at Cleveland Browns ====
Week Eleven: Jacksonville Jaguars at Cleveland Browns – Game summary

Quarter	1	2	3	4	Total
Jaguars	0	7	0	3	**10**
**Browns**	0	7	0	7	**14**

at Cleveland Browns Stadium, Cleveland, Ohio

- Date: November 20
- Game time: 1:00 p.m. EST
- Game weather: Cloudy, 57 °F (14 °C)
- Game attendance: 63,498
- Referee: Terry McAulay
- TV announcers (CBS): Bill Macatee and Steve Tasker
- Game Recap, Game Book

Game information

**First quarter**

- No scoring plays.

**Second quarter**

- JAC – Maurice Jones-Drew 6-yard run (Josh Scobee kick), 10:50. Jaguars 7–0. **Drive: 18 plays, 92 yards, 9:53.**
- CLE – Chris Ogbonnaya 1-yard run (Phil Dawson kick), 3:21. Tied 7–7. **Drive: 8 plays, 87 yards, 4:32.**

**Third quarter**

- No scoring plays.

**Fourth quarter**

- CLE – Joshua Cribbs 3-yard pass from Colt McCoy (Phil Dawson kick), 12:15. Browns 14–7. **Drive: 12 plays, 85 yards, 6:22.**
- JAC – Josh Scobee 42-yard field goal, 5:39. Browns 14–10. **Drive: 13 plays, 56 yards, 6:36.**

**Top passers**

- JAC – Blaine Gabbert – 22/41, 210 yards
- CLE – Colt McCoy – 17/24, 199 yards, TD, INT

**Top rushers**

- JAC – Maurice Jones-Drew – 21 rushes, 87 yards, TD
- CLE – Chris Ogbonnaya – 21 rushes, 115 yards, TD

**Top receivers**

- JAC – Marcedes Lewis – 7 receptions, 64 yards
- CLE – Greg Little – 5 receptions, 59 yards

**Top tacklers**

- JAC – Daryl Smith – 5 tackles, 3 assists
- CLE – Usama Young – 6 tackles, 4 assists

==== Week 12: vs. Houston Texans ====
Week Twelve: Houston Texans at Jacksonville Jaguars – Game summary

Quarter	1	2	3	4	Total
**Texans**	7	13	0	0	**20**
Jaguars	7	3	0	3	**13**

at EverBank Field, Jacksonville, Florida

- Date: November 27, 2011
- Game time: 1:00 p.m. EST
- Game weather: 75 °F (24 °C)
- Game attendance: 62,004
- Referee: Walt Coleman
- TV announcers (CBS): Kevin Harlan and Solomon Wilcots
- Recap, Game Book

Game information

**First quarter**

- JAC – Ashton Youboty 38-yard fumble return (Josh Scobee kick), 13:38. Jaguars 7–0.
- HOU – Arian Foster 1-yard run (Neil Rackers kick), 6:15. Tied 7–7. **Drive: 8 plays, 67 yards, 3:59.**

**Second quarter**

- JAC – Josh Scobee 21-yard field goal, 10:41. Jaguars 10–7. **Drive: 10 plays, 77 yards, 4:49.**
- HOU – Joel Dreessen 20-yard pass from Matt Leinart (Neil Rackers kick), 6:24. Texans 14–10. **Drive: 2 plays, 26 yards, 0:49.**
- HOU – Neil Rackers 53-yard field goal, 4:13. Texans 17–10. **Drive: 4 plays, −1 yard, 1:37.**
- HOU – Neil Rackers 33-yard field goal, 0:02. Texans 20–10. **Drive: 10 plays, 40 yards, 1:43.**

**Third quarter**

- No scoring plays.

**Fourth quarter**

- JAC – Josh Scobee 35-yard field goal, 4:15. Texans 20–13. **Drive: 8 plays, 50 yards, 2:48.**

**Top passers**

- HOU – T. J. Yates – 8/15, 70 yards
- JAC – Blaine Gabbert – 13/29, 136 yards, INT

**Top rushers**

- HOU – Arian Foster – 22 rushes, 65 yards, TD
- JAC – Maurice Jones-Drew – 18 rushes, 99 yards

**Top receivers**

- HOU – Arian Foster – 7 receptions, 24 yards
- JAC – Maurice Jones-Drew – 4 receptions, 67 yards

**Top tacklers**

- HOU – Conner Barwin – 7 tackles, 3 assists, 4 sacks
- JAC – Ashton Youboty – 8 tackles, 1 fumble recovered, TD

==== Week 13: vs. San Diego Chargers ====
Week Thirteen: San Diego Chargers at Jacksonville Jaguars – Game summary

Quarter	1	2	3	4	Total
**Chargers**	10	14	7	7	**38**
Jaguars	0	14	0	0	**14**

at EverBank Field, Jacksonville, Florida

- Date: December 5, 2011
- Game time: 8:30 p.m. EST
- Game weather: 67 °F (19 °C)
- Game attendance: 62,743
- Referee: Walt Anderson
- TV announcers (ESPN): Mike Tirico, Ron Jaworski, Jon Gruden, and Sal Paolantonio
- Recap, Game Book

Game information

**First quarter**

- SD – Mike Tolbert 13-yard run (Nick Novak kick), 6:51. Chargers 7–0. **Drive: 11 plays, 70 yards, 6:05.**
- SD – Nick Novak 29-yard field goal, 0:41. Chargers 10–0. **Drive: 8 plays, 52 yards, 4:37.**

**Second quarter**

- JAC – Maurice Jones-Drew 9-yard pass from Blaine Gabbert (Josh Scobee kick), 7:55. Chargers 10–7. **Drive: 12 plays, 79 yards, 7:46.**
- JAC – Cecil Shorts 5-yard pass from Blaine Gabbert (Josh Scobee kick), 2:32. Jaguars 14–10. **Drive: 7 plays, 70 yards, 3:42.**
- SD – Vincent Brown 22-yard pass from Philip Rivers (Nick Novak kick), 1:26. Chargers 17–14. **Drive: 8 plays, 68 yards, 1:06.**
- SD – Vincent Jackson 35-yard pass from Philip Rivers (Nick Novak kick), 0:16. Chargers 24–14. **Drive: 3 plays, 59 yards, 0:37.**

**Third quarter**

- SD – Malcom Floyd 52-yard pass from Philip Rivers (Nick Novak kick), 12:04. Chargers 31–14. **Drive: 5 plays, 80 yards, 2:56.**

**Fourth quarter**

- SD – Ryan Mathews 31-yard run (Nick Novak kick), 10:48. Chargers 38–14. **Drive: 1 play, 31 yards, 0:09.**

**Top passers**

- SD – Philip Rivers – 22/29, 294 yards, 3 TD
- JAC – Blaine Gabbert – 19/33, 195 yards, 2 TD, INT

**Top rushers**

- SD – Ryan Mathews – 13 rushes, 112 yards, TD
- JAC – Maurice Jones-Drew – 20 rushes, 97 yards

**Top receivers**

- SD – Antonio Gates – 6 receptions, 70 yards
- JAC – Maurice Jones-Drew – 6 receptions, 91 yards, TD

**Top tacklers**

- SD – Takeo Spikes – 6 tackles, 3 assists
- JAC – Paul Posluszny – 7 tackles, 4 assists

==== Week 14: vs. Tampa Bay Buccaneers ====
Week Fourteen: Tampa Bay Buccaneers at Jacksonville Jaguars – Game summary

Quarter	1	2	3	4	Total
Buccaneers	7	7	0	0	**14**
**Jaguars**	0	28	0	13	**41**

at EverBank Field, Jacksonville, Florida

- Date: December 11, 2011
- Game time: 1:00 p.m. EST
- Game weather: 58 °F (14 °C)
- Game attendance: 62,562
- Referee: Jerome Boger
- TV announcers (Fox): Sam Rosen and Chad Pennington
- Recap, Game Book

Game information

**First quarter**

- TB – LeGarrette Blount 1-yard run (Connor Barth kick), 9:24. Buccaneers 7–0. **Drive: 10 plays, 80 yards, 5:36.**

**Second quarter**

- TB – Josh Freeman 13-yard run (Connor Barth kick), 14:09. Buccaneers 14–0. **Drive: 6 plays, 52 yards, 3:02.**
- JAC – Colin Cloherty 8-yard fumble return (Josh Scobee kick), 7:36. Buccaneers 14–7.
- JAC – Maurice Jones-Drew 1-yard run (Josh Scobee kick), 2:05. Tied 14–14. **Drive: 4 plays, 77 yards, 2:27.**
- JAC – Nate Collins fumble recovery in end zone (Josh Scobee kick), 1:53. Jaguars 21–14.
- JAC – Maurice Jones-Drew 5-yard pass from Blaine Gabbert (Josh Scobee kick), 0:04. Jaguars 28–14. **Drive: 9 plays, 49 yards, 0:58.**

**Third quarter**

- No scoring plays.

**Fourth quarter**

- JAC – Maurice Jones-Drew 5-yard pass from Blaine Gabbert (Josh Scobee kick), 10:22. Jaguars 35–14. **Drive: 10 plays, 74 yards, 5:31.**.
- JAC – Maurice Jones-Drew 1-yard run (run failed), 2:31. Jaguars 41–14. **Drive: 9 plays, 55 yards, 4:55.**

**Top passers**

- TB – Josh Freeman – 16/30, 181 yards, 2 INT
- JAC – Blaine Gabbert – 19/33, 217 yards, 2 TD, 2 INT

**Top rushers**

- TB – LeGarrette Blount – 18 rushes, 74 yards, TD
- JAC – Maurice Jones-Drew – 27 rushes, 85 yards, 2 TD

**Top receivers**

- TB – Mike Williams – 3 receptions, 35 yards
- JAC – Maurice Jones-Drew – 6 receptions, 51 yards, 2 TD

**Top tacklers**

- TB – Tanard Jackson, 7 tackles
- JAC – Russell Allen, 6 tackles, 1 assist, 1 pass defended, 1 forced fumble

==== Week 15: at Atlanta Falcons ====
Week Fifteen: Jacksonville Jaguars at Atlanta Falcons – Game summary

Quarter	1	2	3	4	Total
Jaguars	0	0	7	7	**14**
**Falcons**	10	17	14	0	**41**

at Georgia Dome, Atlanta, Georgia

- Date: December 15, 2011
- Game time: 8:30 p.m. EST
- Game weather: None (indoor stadium)
- Game attendance: 68,856
- Referee: Ron Winter
- TV announcers (NFLN): Brad Nessler, Mike Mayock, and Alex Flanagan
- Recap, Game Book

Game information

**First quarter**

- ATL – Julio Jones 29-yard pass from Matt Ryan (Matt Bryant kick), 10:51. Falcons 7–0. **Drive: 7 plays, 75 yards, 4:09.**
- ATL – Matt Bryant 33-yard field goal, 3:18. Falcons 10–0. **Drive: 9 plays, 43 yards, 5:33.**

**Second quarter**

- ATL – Michael Turner 5-yard run (Matt Bryant kick), 13:03. Falcons 17–0. **Drive: 1 plays, 5 yards, 0:04.**
- ATL – Roddy White 6-yard pass from Matt Ryan (Matt Bryant kick), 1:49. Falcons 24–0. **Drive: 9 plays, 72 yards, 3:55.**
- ATL – Matt Bryant 31-yard field goal, 0:00. Falcons 27–0. **Drive: 4 plays, 6 yards, 0:46.**

**Third quarter**

- ATL – Corey Peters 13-yard fumble return (Matt Bryant kick), 13:33. Falcons 34–0.
- ATL – Roddy White 29-yard pass from Matt Ryan (Matt Bryant kick), 6:38. Falcons 41–0. **Drive: 8 plays, 79 yards, 5:07.**
- JAC – Zach Potter 46 yard return of blocked punt (Josh Scobee kick), 2:12. Falcons 41–7.

**Fourth quarter**

- JAC – Chastin West 16-yard pass from Blaine Gabbert (Josh Scobee kick), 0:59. Falcons 41–14. **Drive: 10 plays, 85 yards, 2:14.**

**Top passers**

- JAC – Blaine Gabbert – 12/22, 141 yards, TD, INT
- ATL – Matt Ryan – 19/26, 224 yards, 3 TD

**Top rushers**

- JAC – Maurice Jones-Drew – 17 rushes, 112 yards
- ATL – Michael Turner – 19 rushes, 61 yards, TD

**Top receivers**

- JAC – Chastin West – 3 receptions, 38 yards, TD
- ATL – Roddy White – 10 receptions, 135 yards, 2 TD

**Top tacklers**

- JAC – Ashton Youboty – 7 tackles, 1 assist, 1 pass defended
- ATL – Curtis Lofton – 6 tackles, 2 assists, 1 fumble recovered

==== Week 16: at Tennessee Titans ====
Week Sixteen: Jacksonville Jaguars at Tennessee Titans – Game summary

Quarter	1	2	3	4	Total
Jaguars	7	3	0	7	**17**
**Titans**	10	7	3	3	**23**

at LP Field, Nashville, Tennessee

- Date: December 24, 2011
- Game time: 12:00 p.m. CST
- Game weather: Sunny, 44 °F (7 °C)
- Game attendance: 69,143
- Referee: Gene Steratore
- TV announcers (CBS): Bill Macatee and Steve Tasker
- Recap, Game Book

Game information

**First quarter**

- TEN – Rob Bironas 51-yard field goal, 7:05. Titans 3–0. **Drive: 5 plays, 24 yards, 1:48.**
- TEN – Jared Cook 55-yard pass from Matt Hasselbeck (Rob Bironas kick), 4:39. Titans 10–0. **Drive: 1 play, 55 yards, 0:07.**
- JAC – Maurice Jones-Drew 10-yard run (Josh Scobee kick), 0:19. Titans 10–7. **Drive: 8 plays, 82 yards, 4:20.**

**Second quarter**

- TEN – Jamie Harper 1-yard run (Rob Bironas kick), 12:03. Titans 17–7. **Drive: 78 plays, 76 yards, 3:16.**
- JAC – Josh Scobee 39-yard field goal, 0:31. Titans 17–10. **Drive: 12 plays, 43 yards, 1:53.**

**Third quarter**

- TEN – Rob Bironas 51-yard field goal, 6:16. Titans 20–10. **Drive: 7 plays, 33 yards, 3:22.**

**Fourth quarter**

- TEN – Rob Bironas 35-yard field goal, 12:29. Titans 23–10. **Drive: 7 plays, 63 yards, 2:19.**
- JAC – Greg Jones 1-yard run (Josh Scobee kick), 3:41. Titans 23–17. **Drive: 10 plays, 35 yards, 1:57.**

**Top passers**

- JAC – Blaine Gabbert – 21/42, 198 yards, INT
- TEN – Matt Hasselbeck – 24/40, 340 yards, TD, 2 INT

**Top rushers**

- JAC – Maurice Jones-Drew – 24 rushes, 103 yards, TD
- TEN – Chris Johnson – 15 rushes, 56 yards

**Top receivers**

- JAC – Maurice Jones-Drew – 6 receptions, 21 yards
- TEN – Jared Cook – 8 receptions, 169 yards, TD

**Top tacklers**

- JAC – Akwasi Owusu-Ansah – 7 tackles, 1 assist
- TEN – Derrick Morgan – 7 tackles

==== Week 17: vs. Indianapolis Colts ====
Week Seventeen: Indianapolis Colts at Jacksonville Jaguars – Game summary

Quarter	1	2	3	4	Total
Colts	0	3	3	7	**13**
**Jaguars**	7	3	6	3	**19**

at EverBank Field, Jacksonville, Florida

- Date: January 1, 2012
- Game time: 1:00 p.m. EST
- Game weather: 70 °F (21 °C)
- Game attendance: 62,481
- Referee: John Parry
- TV announcers (CBS): Spero Dedes and Steve Beuerlein
- Recap, Game Book

Game information

**First quarter**

- JAC – Chastin West 23-yard pass from Blaine Gabbert (Josh Scobee kick), 3:10. Jaguars 7–0. **Drive: 6 plays, 35 yards, 3:19.**

**Second quarter**

- IND – Adam Vinatieri 48-yard field goal, 12:03. Jaguars 7–3. **Drive: 14 plays, 54 yards, 6:07.**
- JAC – Josh Scobee 25-yard field goal, 1:01. Jaguars 10–3. **Drive: 9 plays, 61 yards, 4:49.**

**Third quarter**

- IND – Adam Vinatieri 20-yard field goal, 9:07. Jaguars 10–6. **Drive: 13 plays, 78 yards, 5:53.**
- JAC – Josh Scobee 32-yard field goal, 7:33. Jaguars 13–6. **Drive: 5 plays, 57 yards, 1:34.**
- JAC – Josh Scobee 47-yard field goal, 5:47. Jaguars 16–6. **Drive: 4 plays, −10 yards, 0:48.**

**Fourth quarter**

- JAC – Josh Scobee 39-yard field goal, 6:30. Jaguars 19–6. **Drive: 7 plays, 25 yards, 4:08.**
- JAC – Austin Collie 12-yard pass from Dan Orlovsky (Adam Vinatieri kick), 3:22. Jaguars 19–13. **Drive: 8 plays, 82 yards, 3:08.**

**Top passers**

- IND – Dan Orlovsky – 27/40, 264 yards, TD, 2 INT
- JAC – Blaine Gabbert – 11/19, 92 yards, TD

**Top rushers**

- IND – Donald Brown – 8 rushes, 24 yards
- JAC – Maurice Jones-Drew – 25 rushes, 169 yards

**Top receivers**

- IND – Austin Collie – 9 receptions, 96 yards, TD
- JAC – Marcedes Lewis – 3 receptions, 33 yards

**Top tacklers**

- IND – Antoine Bethea, 8 tackles, 2 assists
- JAC – Kevin Rutland, 9 tackles

=== Standings ===
==== Division ====
AFC South
	W	L	T	PCT	DIV	CONF	PF	PA	STK
^{(3)} Houston Texans	10	6	0	.625	4–2	8–4	381	278	L3
Tennessee Titans	9	7	0	.563	3–3	7–5	325	317	W2
Jacksonville Jaguars	5	11	0	.313	3–3	4–8	243	329	W1
Indianapolis Colts	2	14	0	.125	2–4	2–10	243	430	L1

==== Conference ====
AFC
#	Team	Division	W	L	T	PCT	DIV	CONF	SOS	SOV	STK
**Division winners**
1	New England Patriots	East	13	3	0	.813	5–1	10–2	.449	.423	W8
2 (Note: Baltimore clinched the AFC North title based on a head-to-head sweep over Pittsburgh.)	Baltimore Ravens	North	12	4	0	.750	6–0	9–3	.477	.484	W2
3	Houston Texans	South	10	6	0	.625	4–2	8–4	.453	.413	L3
4 (Note: Denver clinched the AFC West title instead of San Diego or Oakland based on common record (5–5 to San Diego's and Oakland's 4–6).)	Denver Broncos	West	8	8	0	.500	3–3	6–6	.520	.445	L3
**Wild cards**
5	Pittsburgh Steelers	North	12	4	0	.750	4–2	9–3	.492	.411	W2
6 (Note: Cincinnati clinched the AFC 6 seed instead of Tennessee based on a head-to-head victory.)	Cincinnati Bengals	North	9	7	0	.563	2–4	6–6	.492	.326	L1
**Did not qualify for the postseason**
7	Tennessee Titans	South	9	7	0	.563	3–3	7–5	.461	.396	W2
8 (Note: New York Jets finished ahead of San Diego based on head-to-head victory.)	New York Jets	East	8	8	0	.500	3–3	6–6	.500	.395	L3
9 (Note: San Diego finished ahead of Oakland in the AFC West based on conference record (7–5 to 6–6).)	San Diego Chargers	West	8	8	0	.500	3–3	7–5	.516	.430	W1
10	Oakland Raiders	West	8	8	0	.500	3–3	6–6	.504	.438	L1
11	Kansas City Chiefs	West	7	9	0	.438	3–3	4–8	.512	.464	W1
12 (Note: Miami finished ahead of Buffalo based on head-to-head sweep.)	Miami Dolphins	East	6	10	0	.375	3–3	5–7	.504	.417	W1
13	Buffalo Bills	East	6	10	0	.375	1–5	4–8	.520	.510	L1
14	Jacksonville Jaguars	South	5	11	0	.313	3–3	4–8	.500	.363	W1
15	Cleveland Browns	North	4	12	0	.250	0–6	3–9	.531	.313	L6
16	Indianapolis Colts	South	2	14	0	.125	2–4	2–10	.539	.594	L1
**Tiebreakers** (Note: When breaking ties for three or more teams under the NFL's rules, they are first broken within divisions, then comparing only the highest ranked remaining team from each division.)

== Awards and records ==
- Maurice Jones-Drew, Franchise Record, Most Rushing Yards in One Season (1,606).
- Maurice Jones-Drew, 2011 NFL Rushing Yards Leader.
