= 2011 Indianapolis Colts season =

59th season in franchise History

- Owner: Jim Irsay
- General manager: Chris Polian
- Head coach: Jim Caldwell
- Home stadium: Lucas Oil Stadium

Results
- Record: 2–14
- Division place: 4th AFC South
- Playoffs: Did not qualify
- Pro Bowlers: DE Dwight Freeney; DE Robert Mathis

Uniform
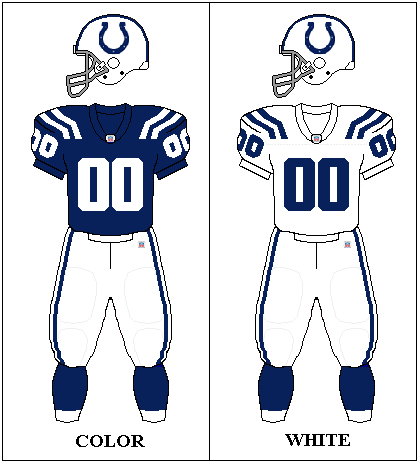

The 2011 season was the Indianapolis Colts' 59th in the National Football League (NFL), their 28th in Indianapolis, their fourth playing their home games at Lucas Oil Stadium, and their third and final season under head coach Jim Caldwell. The Colts were coming off a 10–6 record in 2010 and a second consecutive AFC South championship, as well as a ninth consecutive playoff appearance.

The Colts had placed their franchise tag on superstar quarterback Peyton Manning before the season started but he sat out the entire season due to neck surgery. Also, Manning was never placed on injured reserve, but instead was on the Colts inactive list for each game. The Colts turned to retired quarterback Kerry Collins and then to Curtis Painter, neither of whom could fill Manning's void. The Colts' offense weakened rapidly in 2011. They were 30th in the league in yards gained (compared to 4th in 2010), 27th in passing yards (compared to 1st in 2010), 29th in receiving yards (compared to 2nd in 2010), 28th in scoring (compared to 4th in 2010), and 28th in total touchdowns (compared to 2nd in 2010). The Colts set a dubious NFL record on pass defense, by allowing 71.2% completed passes by opposing passers.

As early as the seventh week of the season, media discussion of whether the Colts might become the second team after the 2008 Detroit Lions to finish winless in a 16-game season began. With Stanford quarterback Andrew Luck regarded as a can't-miss franchise player in the upcoming draft, there was discussion of whether the Colts should "Suck for Luck" (aim to finish winless) in order to get the first overall pick and draft him. The Colts became even less competitive in the second half of the season, with some critics comparing them to the 2008 Lions. The Colts finished the season with a 2–14 record, their worst record since 1991, and missed the playoffs for the first time since 2001. As of the 2024, this is the most recent season (and only since divisional realignment) the Colts have finished in last place in the AFC South.

On January 2, 2012, one day after the final game of the season, Colts owner Jim Irsay fired team Vice Chairman Bill Polian and his son, team Vice President and general manager Chris Polian. Irsay stated that the fate of head coach Jim Caldwell was still under review. On January 17, 2012, Irsay announced the firing of Caldwell as the head coach of the Colts. On March 7, 2012, Manning was released by the Colts. These moves marked the first major rebuilding of the team since the Polians joined.

== Offseason ==
=== 2011 draft board ===
Round	Selection	Player	Position	College
1	22	Anthony Castonzo	OT	Boston College
2	49^{[b]}	Ben Ijalana	OT	Villanova
3	87	Drake Nevis	DT	LSU
4	119	Delone Carter	RB	Syracuse
6	188	Chris Rucker	CB	Michigan State

^{^[a]} The Colts traded their seventh-round selection to the Washington Redskins in exchange for CB Justin Tryon.
^{^[b]} The Colts traded their second-round (fifty-fourth overall) selection and their fifth round (152nd overall) selection for the Jacksonville Jaguars’ second round (forty-ninth overall) selection.

== Coaching staff ==
Indianapolis Colts 2011 staff
Front office: Owner/CEO – James Irsay; Vice chairman – Bill Polian; Vice president/general manager – Chris Polian; Director of player personnel – Tom Telesco; Director of football administration – Dennis Polian; Associate director of pro personnel – Kevin Rogers; Head coaches: Head coach – Jim Caldwell; Offensive coaches: Offensive coordinator – Clyde Christensen; Quarterbacks – Ron Turner; Running backs – David Walker; Wide receivers – Frank Reich; Tight ends – Ricky Thomas; Offensive line – Pete Metzelaars; Assistant offensive line – Ron Prince; Assistant to the offensive coordinator – Jim Bob Cooter	Defensive coaches: Defensive coordinator/linebackers – Mike Murphy; Defensive line – John Teerlinck; Defensive backs – Alan Williams; Special assistant to the defense – Rod Perry; Defensive assistant – Bill Teerlinck; Special teams coaches: Special teams coordinator – Ray Rychleski; Strength and conditioning: Strength and conditioning – Jon Torine; Assistant strength and conditioning – Richard Howell; Coaching assistants: Devin Fitzsimmons

== Final roster ==
2011 Indianapolis Colts roster
Quarterbacks (QB): 18 Peyton Manning; 6 Dan Orlovsky; 7 Curtis Painter; Running backs (RB): 29 Joseph Addai; 31 Donald Brown; 34 Delone Carter; 42 Jerome Felton FB; 47 Ryan Mahaffey FB; Wide receivers (WR): 17 Austin Collie; 12 Quan Cosby; 85 Pierre Garçon; 11 Anthony Gonzalez; 87 Reggie Wayne; Tight ends (TE): 44 Dallas Clark; 81 Brody Eldridge; 83 Anthony Hill; 84 Jacob Tamme	Offensive linemen (OL): 74 Anthony Castonzo T; 71 Ryan Diem G; 72 Jeff Linkenbach T; 69 Quinn Ojinnaka T; 78 Mike Pollak G/C; 76 Joe Reitz G; 61 Jamey Richard G/C; 63 Jeff Saturday C; Defensive linemen (DL): 97 Mario Addison DE; 90 Jamaal Anderson DE; 96 Tyler Brayton DE/DT; 93 Dwight Freeney DE; 92 Jerry Hughes DE; 99 Antonio Johnson DT; 98 Robert Mathis DE; 91 Ricardo Mathews DT; 95 Fili Moala DT	Linebackers (LB): 51 Pat Angerer MLB; 57 Kevin Bentley OLB; 53 Kavell Conner OLB; 54 Zac Diles OLB; 52 A. J. Edds OLB; 56 Scott Lutrus MLB; 55 Ernie Sims OLB; Defensive backs (DB): 41 Antoine Bethea FS; 30 David Caldwell SS; 26 Jermale Hines FS; 20 Mike Holmes CB; 37 Brandon King CB; 27 Jacob Lacey CB; 35 Joe Lefggred SS/RS; 36 Chris Rucker CB; 21 Kevin Thomas CB; Special teams (ST): 1 Pat McAfee P; 48 Justin Snow LS; 4 Adam Vinatieri K	Practice squad: 3 Jarrett Brown QB; 32 Darren Evans RB; 16 Jarred Fayson WR; 60 Matt Murphy G; 64 Ollie Ogbu DT; 10 Jeremy Ross WR; 67 Mike Tepper T; Reserve: 58 Gary Brackett MLB (IR); 28 Stevie Brown FS (IR); 33 Melvin Bullitt SS (IR); 5 Kerry Collins QB (IR); 68 Eric Foster DT (IR); 49 Chris Gronkowski FB (IR); 79 Ben Ijalana G/T (IR); 23 Terrence Johnson CB (IR); 94 Drake Nevis DT (IR); 73 Seth Olsen G (IR); 25 Jerraud Powers CB (IR); -- Jaimie Thomas G (IR); 50 Philip Wheeler OLB (IR); 15 Blair White WR (IR); -- James Williams T (IR); Rookies in italics 53 active, 15 reserve, 7 practice squad

== Preseason ==
Week	Date	Opponent	Result	Record	Venue	Recap
1	August 13	at St. Louis Rams	L 10–33	0–1	Edward Jones Dome	Recap
2	August 19	Washington Redskins	L 3–16	0–2	Lucas Oil Stadium	Recap
3	August 26	Green Bay Packers	L 21–24	0–3	Lucas Oil Stadium	Recap
4	September 1	at Cincinnati Bengals	W 17–13	1–3	Paul Brown Stadium	Recap

== Regular season ==
=== Schedule ===
In addition to their regular games with AFC South division rivals, the Colts played games against the AFC North and NFC South according to the NFL's schedule rotation, and also played games against the Patriots and the Chiefs based upon finishing positions from 2010.

Week	Date	Opponent	Result	Record	Venue	Recap
1	September 11	at **Houston Texans**	**L** 7–34	0–1	Reliant Stadium	Recap
2	September 18	Cleveland Browns	**L** 19–27	0–2	Lucas Oil Stadium	Recap
3	September 25	Pittsburgh Steelers	**L** 20–23	0–3	Lucas Oil Stadium	Recap
4	October 3	at Tampa Bay Buccaneers	**L** 17–24	0–4	Raymond James Stadium	Recap
5	October 9	Kansas City Chiefs	**L** 24–28	0–5	Lucas Oil Stadium	Recap
6	October 16	at Cincinnati Bengals	**L** 17–27	0–6	Paul Brown Stadium	Recap
7	October 23	at New Orleans Saints	**L** 7–62	0–7	Mercedes-Benz Superdome	Recap
8	October 30	at **Tennessee Titans**	**L** 10–27	0–8	LP Field	Recap
9	November 6	Atlanta Falcons	**L** 7–31	0–9	Lucas Oil Stadium	Recap
10	November 13	**Jacksonville Jaguars**	**L** 3–17	0–10	Lucas Oil Stadium	Recap
11	Bye					
12	November 27	Carolina Panthers	**L** 19–27	0–11	Lucas Oil Stadium	Recap
13	December 4	at New England Patriots	**L** 24–31	0–12	Gillette Stadium	Recap
14	December 11	at Baltimore Ravens	**L** 10–24	0–13	M&T Bank Stadium	Recap
15	December 18	**Tennessee Titans**	**W** 27–13	1–13	Lucas Oil Stadium	Recap
16	December 22	**Houston Texans**	**W** 19–16	2–13	Lucas Oil Stadium	Recap
17	January 1	at **Jacksonville Jaguars**	**L** 13–19	2–14	EverBank Field	Recap

Note: Intra-division opponents are in bold text.

=== Game summaries ===
==== Week 1: at Houston Texans ====
Week One: Indianapolis Colts at Houston Texans – Game summary

Quarter	1	2	3	4	Total
Colts	0	0	0	7	**7**
**Texans**	17	17	0	0	**34**

at Reliant Stadium, Houston, Texas

- Date: September 11
- Game time: 1:00 p.m. EDT
- Game weather: None (retractable roof closed)
- Game attendance: 71,444
- Referee: Walt Coleman
- TV announcers (CBS): Greg Gumbel and Dan Dierdorf
- Recap

Game information

**First quarter**

- HOU – Neil Rackers 25-yard field goal, 4:27. Texans 3–0. **Drive: 13 plays, 73 yards, 6:32.**
- HOU – Derrick Ward 1-yard run (Neil Rackers kick), 2:56. Texans 10–0. **Drive: 2 plays, 5 yards, 0:41.**
- HOU – Ben Tate 2-yard run (Neil Rackers kick), 1:41. Texans 17–0. **Drive: 3 plays, 18 yards, 1:08.**

**Second quarter**

- HOU –Andre Johnson 4-yard pass from Matt Schaub (Neil Rackers kick), 6:57. Texans 24–0. **Drive: 10 plays, 89 yards, 5:54.**
- HOU – Neil Rackers 29-yard field goal, 1:34. Texans 27–0. **Drive: 9 plays, 51 yards, 3:51.**
- HOU – Jacoby Jones 79-yard punt return (Neil Rackers kick), 0:54. Texans 34–0.

**Third quarter**

- No scoring plays

**Fourth quarter**

- IND – Reggie Wayne 6-yard pass from Kerry Collins (Adam Vinatieri kick), 9:17. Texans 34–7. **Drive: 2 plays, 13 yards, 1:10.**

**Top passers**

- IND – Kerry Collins – 16/31, 197 yards, TD
- HOU – Matt Schaub – 17/24, 220 yards, TD, 2 INT

**Top rushers**

- IND – Joseph Addai – 8 rushes, 39 yards
- HOU – Ben Tate – 24 rushes, 116 yards, TD

**Top receivers**

- IND – Reggie Wayne – 7 receptions, 106 yards, TD
- HOU – Andre Johnson – 7 receptions, 95 yards, TD

The Indianapolis Colts began their 2011 season at Reliant Stadium against the Houston Texans. For the first time since the 1997 season, Peyton Manning was not under the helm at quarterback; recently acquired Kerry Collins took his position. The game started very well for the Colts, opening up with an interception by Melvin Bullitt that allowed the Colts to take control. However, a three and out from the offense quickly gave the Texans the ball to drive down and score a field goal and take a 3–0 lead. Collins and the Colts offense was out of sync for much of the first quarter, fumbling two snaps and giving Houston great field position inside of the Indianapolis 40-yard line. After the first quarter, the Texans held a commanding 17–0 lead and were firing on all cylinders. The second quarter continued Houston's dominance, with all three teams of the Colts failing to stop or to execute against the Texans. At halftime, the Colts trailed Houston 34–0, the largest deficit in the entire 58-year history of the franchise. The second half saw little action with both teams taking shorter drives and in some senses, running down the clock. The Colts scored their first and the only points scored in the second half with a Reggie Wayne touchdown from Collins in the fourth quarter. The Colts went on to lose to the Texans 34–7, their second straight season starting 0–1.

==== Week 2: vs. Cleveland Browns ====
Week Two: Cleveland Browns at Indianapolis Colts – Game summary

Quarter	1	2	3	4	Total
**Browns**	0	14	0	13	**27**
Colts	3	6	3	7	**19**

at Lucas Oil Stadium, Indianapolis, Indiana

- Date: September 18
- Game time: 1:00 p.m. EDT
- Game weather: None (retractable roof closed)
- Game attendance: 65,035
- Referee: Gene Steratore
- TV announcers (CBS): Marv Albert and Rich Gannon
- Recap

Game information

**First quarter**

- IND – Adam Vinatieri 39-yard field goal, 10:36. Colts 3–0. **Drive: 10 plays, 67 yards, 4:29.**

**Second quarter**

- IND – Adam Vinatieri 27-yard field goal, 14:20. Colts 6–0. **Drive: 10 plays, 78 yards, 4:40.**
- CLE – Evan Moore 16-yard pass from Colt McCoy (Phil Dawson kick), 8:01. Browns 7–6. **Drive: 11 plays, 55 yards, 6:22.**
- IND – Adam Vinatieri 52-yard field goal, 3:58. Colts 9–7. **Drive: 10 plays, 34 yards, 4:00.**
- CLE – Peyton Hillis 1-yard run (Phil Dawson kick), 0:15. Browns 14–9. **Drive: 10 plays, 80 yards, 3:38.**

**Third quarter**

- IND – Adam Vinatieri 36-yard field goal, 6:57. Browns 14–12. **Drive: 9 plays, 42 yards, 3:52.**

**Fourth quarter**

- CLE – Phil Dawson 20-yard field goal, 10:57. Browns 17–12. **Drive: 7 plays, 19 yards, 3:49.**
- CLE – Peyton Hillis 24-yard run (Phil Dawson kick), 3:55. Browns 24–12. **Drive: 3 plays, 28 yards, 0:55.**
- CLE – Phil Dawson 23-yard field goal, 2:59. Browns 27–12. **Drive: 4 plays, 9 yards, 0:24.**
- IND – Dallas Clark 6-yard pass from Kerry Collins (Adam Vinatieri kick), 0:24. Browns 27–19. **Drive: 12 plays, 83 yards, 2:35.**

**Top passers**

- CLE – Colt McCoy – 22/32, 211 yards, TD
- IND – Kerry Collins – 19/38, 191 yards, TD, INT

**Top rushers**

- CLE – Peyton Hillis – 27 rushes, 94 yards, 2 TD
- IND – Joseph Addai – 14 rushes, 64 yards

**Top receivers**

- CLE – Mohamed Massaquoi – 3 receptions, 45 yards
- IND – Reggie Wayne – 4 receptions, 66 yards

The Indianapolis Colts had their 2011 home opener against the 0–1 Cleveland Browns. The first quarter saw both teams getting into offensive and defensive rhythms and ended with the Colts holding only a 3–0 lead on an Adam Vinatieri field goal. Heading to the second quarter, the Colts offense began to pick up behind Kerry Collins, rookie Delone Carter, and Joseph Addai. However much of the success faded once Indianapolis reached the red zone, and were only able to come away with two field goals during the quarter. Cleveland, however, was able to capitalize on the Colts defense, and saw a touchdown pass from Colt McCoy and a touchdown run from Peyton Hillis. Cleveland went into halftime with a 14–9 lead. The Indianapolis defense was able to stop Cleveland for most of the third quarter, and allowed the struggling offensive to close the gap with a fourth Vinatieri field goal, with Cleveland still holding a 14–12 lead into the fourth quarter. Cleveland quickly drove down the field and started the quarter with a Phil Dawson field goal, allowing the Colts to remain in contention for the victory. However, after turnovers and an inability to produce on offense, Cleveland broke the game open with a Hillis touchdown run, along with another Dawson field goal with 2:59 remaining in the game. With Cleveland holding a 27–12 lead, Indianapolis was able to score their first touchdown of the game, allowing them to try an onside kick to preserve any chance of a comeback, which they were not able to convert. Cleveland finished the game and the Colts by winning 27–19, their first victory over the Colts since 1994, and the Colts' first 0–2 start since the 1998 season.

==== Week 3: vs. Pittsburgh Steelers ====
Week Three: Pittsburgh Steelers at Indianapolis Colts – Game summary

Quarter	1	2	3	4	Total
**Steelers**	10	0	0	13	**23**
Colts	0	13	0	7	**20**

at Lucas Oil Stadium, Indianapolis, Indiana

- Date: September 25
- Game time: 8:20 p.m. EDT
- Game weather: None (retractable roof closed)
- Game attendance: 66,309
- Referee: Terry McAulay
- TV announcers (NBC): Al Michaels, Cris Collinsworth and Michele Tafoya
- Recap

Game information

**First quarter**

- PIT – Shaun Suisham 48-yard field goal, 12:48. Steelers 3–0. **Drive: 7 plays, 50 yards, 2:17.**
- PIT – Mike Wallace 81-yard pass from Ben Roethlisberger (Shaun Suisham kick), 3:40. Steelers 10–0. **Drive: 2 plays, 86 yards, 0:53.**

**Second quarter**

- IND – Adam Vinatieri 21-yard field goal, 10:36. Steelers 10–3. **Drive: 12 plays, 47 yards, 5:44.**
- IND – Jamaal Anderson 47-yard fumble return (Adam Vinatieri kick), 2:01. Tied 10–10.
- IND – Adam Vinatieri 36-yard field goal, 0:18. Colts 13–10. **Drive: 4 plays, 5 yards, 1:19.**

**Third quarter**

- No scoring plays

**Fourth quarter**

- PIT – Shaun Suisham 48-yard field goal, 12:15. Tied 13–13. **Drive: 10 plays, 50 yards, 5:40.**
- PIT – Troy Polamalu 47-yard fumble return (Shaun Suisham kick), 5:21. Steelers 20–13.
- IND – Joseph Addai 6-yard run (Adam Vinatieri kick), 2:15. Tied 20–20. **Drive: 10 plays, 80 yards, 3:38.**
- PIT – Shaun Suisham 38-yard field goal, 0:08. Steelers 23–20. **Drive: 10 plays, 60 yards, 2:05.**

**Top passers**

- PIT – Ben Roethlisberger – 25/37, 364 yards, TD, INT
- IND – Kerry Collins – 13/29, 93 yards

**Top rushers**

- PIT – Rashard Mendenhall – 18 rushes, 37 yards
- IND – Joseph Addai – 17 rushes, 86 yards, TD

**Top receivers**

- PIT – Mike Wallace – 5 receptions, 144 yards, TD
- IND – Pierre Garçon – 6 receptions, 82 yards

Hoping to rebound from their loss to the Cleveland Browns, the Indianapolis Colts remained at home for a week three intra-conference matchup with the Pittsburgh Steelers on Sunday night. Indianapolis trailed early in the first quarter as Steelers kicker Shaun Suisham got a 48-yard field goal, followed by quarterback Ben Roethlisberger completing an 81-yard touchdown pass to wide receiver Mike Wallace. The Colts answered in the second quarter with a 21-yard field goal from kicker Adam Vinatieri, followed by defensive end Jamaal Anderson returning a fumble, forced by Dwight Freeney, 47 yards for a touchdown. Another defensive turnover allowed the Colts and Vinatieri to score a 25-yard field goal, giving them a 13–10 lead at halftime. After a scoreless third quarter, Pittsburgh took the lead in the fourth quarter with a Suisham 44-yard field goal, followed by safety Troy Polamalu returning a fumble 16 yards for a touchdown. Indianapolis tied the game again on running back Joseph Addai's 6-yard touchdown run with 2:15 remaining in the game. However, the Steelers were able to capture the win with a final 38-yard field goal from Suisham, dropping the Colts to 0–3.

==== Week 4: at Tampa Bay Buccaneers ====
Week Four: Indianapolis Colts at Tampa Bay Buccaneers – Game summary

Quarter	1	2	3	4	Total
Colts	3	7	7	0	**17**
**Buccaneers**	0	7	10	7	**24**

at Raymond James Stadium, Tampa, Florida

- Date: October 3
- Game time: 8:30 p.m. EDT
- Game weather: Clear, 80 °F or 26.7 °C
- Game attendance: 63,972
- Referee: Ron Winter
- TV announcers (ESPN): Mike Tirico, Ron Jaworski, Jon Gruden and Wendi Nix
- Recap

Game information

**First quarter**

- IND – Adam Vinatieri 45-yard field goal, 10:31. Colts 3–0. **Drive: 11 plays, 53 yards, 4:34.**

**Second quarter**

- IND – Pierre Garçon 87-yard pass from Curtis Painter (Adam Vinatieri kick), 9:01. Colts 10–0. **Drive: 3 plays, 98 yards, 1:27.**
- TB – Josh Freeman 1-yard run (Connor Barth kick), 4:00. Colts 10–7. **Drive: 8 plays, 81 yards, 4:53.**

**Third quarter**

- TB – Connor Barth 46-yard field goal, 10:31. Tied 10–10. **Drive: 10 plays, 52 yards, 5:17.**
- IND – Pierre Garçon 59-yard pass from Curtis Painter (Adam Vinatieri kick), 7:22. Colts 17–10. **Drive: 1 play, 59 yards, 0:12.**
- TB – Preston Parker 13-yard pass from Josh Freeman (Connor Barth kick), 0:22. Tied 17–17. **Drive: 13 plays, 80 yards, 6:56.**

**Fourth quarter**

- TB – LeGarrette Blount 35-yard run (Connor Barth kick), 3:26. Buccaneers 24–17. **Drive: 6 plays, 60 yards, 3:32.**

**Top passers**

- IND – Curtis Painter – 13/30, 281 yards, 2 TD
- TB – Josh Freeman – 25/39, 287 yards, TD

**Top rushers**

- IND – Joseph Addai – 11 rushes, 41 yards
- TB – LeGarrette Blount – 25 rushes, 127 yards, TD

**Top receivers**

- IND – Pierre Garçon – 2 receptions, 146 yards, 2 TD
- TB – Preston Parker – 5 receptions, 70 yards, TD

Hoping to rebound from their home loss to the Steelers, the Colts flew to Raymond James Stadium for a Week 4 Monday night duel with the Tampa Bay Buccaneers. With quarterback Kerry Collins recovering from concussion, quarterback Curtis Painter made his first career start. Indianapolis delivered the game's opening punch in the first quarter with a 45-yard field goal from kicker Adam Vinatieri. The Colts added to their lead in the second quarter with Painter finding wide receiver Pierre Garçon on an 87-yard touchdown pass, yet the Buccaneers answered with quarterback Josh Freeman getting a 1-yard touchdown run. Tampa Bay tied the game in the third quarter with kicker Connor Barth getting a 46-yard field goal, yet Indianapolis came right back with Painter hooking up Garçon again on a 59-yard touchdown pass. Afterwards, the Buccaneers tied the game with Freeman completing a 13-yard touchdown pass to wide receiver Preston Parker. Tampa Bay took the lead in the fourth quarter with running back LeGarrette Blount getting a 35-yard touchdown run. From there, the defense prevented any comeback from the Colts' offense. With the loss, the Colts dropped to 0–4.

==== Week 5: vs. Kansas City Chiefs ====
Week Five: Kansas City Chiefs at Indianapolis Colts – Game summary

Quarter	1	2	3	4	Total
**Chiefs**	0	14	7	7	**28**
Colts	7	17	0	0	**24**

at Lucas Oil Stadium, Indianapolis, Indiana

- Date: October 9
- Game time: 1:00 p.m. EDT
- Game weather: Sunny, 72 °F or 22.2 °C
- Game attendance: 65,088
- Referee: Carl Cheffers
- TV announcers (CBS): Kevin Harlan and Solomon Wilcots

Game information

**First quarter**

- IND – Pierre Garçon 6-yard pass from Curtis Painter (Adam Vinatieri kick), 7:36. Colts 7–0. **Drive: 12 plays, 80 yards, 7:24.**

**Second quarter**

- IND – Adam Vinatieri 53-yard field goal, 12:23. Colts 10–0. **Drive: 8 plays, 45 yards, 2:29.**
- IND – Pierre Garçon 67-yard pass from Curtis Painter (Adam Vinatieri kick), 11:13. Colts 17–0. **Drive: 1 play, 67 yards, 0:10.**
- KC – Dwayne Bowe 41-yard pass from Matt Cassel (Ryan Succop kick), 5:11. Colts 17–7. **Drive: 6 plays, 70 yards, 2:57.**
- IND – Delone Carter 3-yard run (Adam Vinatieri kick), 1:09. Colts 24–7. **Drive: 8 plays, 80 yards, 4:02.**
- KC – Steve Breaston 16-yard pass from Matt Cassel (Ryan Succop kick), 0:13. Colts 24–14. **Drive: 6 plays, 80 yards, 0:56.**

**Third quarter**

- KC – Dwayne Bowe 5-yard pass from Matt Cassel (Ryan Succop kick), 0:40. Colts 24–21. **Drive: 3 plays, 98 yards, 1:27.**

**Fourth quarter**

- KC – Steve Breaston 11-yard pass from Matt Cassel (Ryan Succop kick), 5:15. Chiefs 28–24. **Drive: 9 plays, 54 yards, 4:39.**

**Top passers**

- KC – Matt Cassel – 21/29, 257 yards, 4 TD
- IND – Curtis Painter – 15/27, 277 yards, 2 TD

**Top rushers**

- KC – Jackie Battle – 19 rushes, 119 yards
- IND – Donald Brown – 8 rushes, 38 yards

**Top receivers**

- KC – Dwayne Bowe – 7 receptions, 128 yards, 2 TD
- IND – Pierre Garçon – 5 receptions, 125 yards, 2 TD

After dropping their first four games of the season, the Indianapolis Colts came back to Lucas Oil Stadium to take on the Kansas City Chiefs. The game opened well for the Colts, who scored on their opening drive with a Curtis Painter to Pierre Garçon touchdown reception. In the second quarter, the Colts scored with an Adam Vinatieri field goal and another Painter to Garçon touchdown, giving Indianapolis a 17–0 lead midway through the second quarter. A Kansas City touchdown pass from Matt Cassel ended the shutout but Indianapolis scored another touchdown later. A late Kansas City touchdown allowed the Colts to go into halftime with a 24–14 lead. Two touchdown passes from Cassel, to Dwayne Bowe and Steve Breaston respectively, gave the Chiefs 21 unanswered points and completed the comeback, winning the game 28–24, dropping the Colts to 0–5 on the season.

==== Week 6: at Cincinnati Bengals ====
Week Six: Indianapolis Colts at Cincinnati Bengals – Game summary

Quarter	1	2	3	4	Total
Colts	0	7	0	10	**17**
**Bengals**	7	3	10	7	**27**

at Paul Brown Stadium, Cincinnati, Ohio

- Date: October 16
- Game time: 1:00 p.m. EDT
- Game weather: Sunny, 71 °F or 21.7 °C
- Game attendance: 52,068
- Referee: John Parry
- TV announcers (CBS): Kevin Harlan and Solomon Wilcots
- Recap

Game information

**First quarter**

- CIN – A. J. Green 11-yard pass from Andy Dalton (Mike Nugent kick), 9:19. Bengals 7–0. **Drive: 6 plays, 44 yards, 2:16.**

**Second quarter**

- IND – Donald Brown 18-yard run (Adam Vinatieri kick), 11:14. Tied 7–7. **Drive: 8 plays, 66 yards, 4:08.**
- CIN – Mike Nugent 20-yard field goal, 0:00. Bengals 10–7. **Drive: 12 plays, 72 yards, 5:56.**

**Third quarter**

- CIN – Cedric Benson 1-yard run (Mike Nugent kick), 10:27. Bengals 17–7. **Drive: 6 plays, 52 yards, 2:59.**
- CIN – Mike Nugent 43-yard field goal, 2:20. Bengals 20–7. **Drive: 11 plays, 56 yards, 6:00.**

**Fourth quarter**

- IND – Adam Vinatieri 46-yard field goal, 14:56. Bengals 20–10. **Drive: 9 plays, 52 yards, 2:24.**
- IND – Dallas Clark 1-yard pass from Curtis Painter (Adam Vinatieri kick), 9:33. Bengals 20–17. **Drive: 10 plays, 74 yards, 4:14.**
- CIN – Carlos Dunlap 35-yard fumble return (Mike Nugent kick), 2:22. Bengals 27–17.

**Top passers**

- IND – Curtis Painter – 23/34, 188 yards, TD, INT
- CIN – Andy Dalton – 25/32, 264 yards, TD

**Top rushers**

- IND – Delone Carter – 14 rushes, 45 yards
- CIN – Cedric Benson – 16 rushes, 57 yards, TD

**Top receivers**

- IND – Reggie Wayne – 5 receptions, 58 yards
- CIN – Jerome Simpson – 6 receptions, 101 yards

With the Colts losing five consecutive games starting the 2011 season, Indianapolis looked to win their first game of the season against the Cincinnati Bengals. Cincinnati opened up the game well, with a 1-yard touchdown run from Cedric Benson. With both defenses performing well throughout the remainder of the first half with the only other scores coming on a Donald Brown touchdown run for the Colts, and a Mike Nugent field goal. Going into halftime, the Bengals led the Colts 10–7. Cincinnati dominated the third quarter on both fronts, with another Benson touchdown run and Nugent field goal, quickly running the lead up to 20–7 heading into the fourth quarter. The Colts were able to strike on an Adam Vinatieri 46-yard field goal, narrowing the score to 20–10. A Dallas Clark touchdown reception from Curtis Painter allowed the Colts to cut the game to a 20–17 affair with 9:33 remaining in the fourth quarter. After a missed Nugent field goal, with the Colts driving, Pierre Garçon fumbled the football, giving it to Carlos Dunlap who took the ball in for a touchdown and the game's last score, with the Bengals winning the game 27–17, giving the Colts an 0–6 record on the season. It was the first time the Colts had lost to the Bengals since 1997, one year before the Colts drafted Peyton Manning. The Colts never lost to the Bengals with Manning as their starter.

==== Week 7: at New Orleans Saints ====
Week Seven: Indianapolis Colts at New Orleans Saints – Game summary

Quarter	1	2	3	4	Total
Colts	0	7	0	0	**7**
**Saints**	21	13	14	14	**62**

at Mercedes-Benz Superdome, New Orleans, Louisiana

- Date: October 23
- Game time: 8:20 p.m. EDT/7:20 p.m. CDT
- Game weather: None (played indoors)
- Game attendance: 73,012
- Referee: Scott Green
- TV announcers (NBC): Al Michaels, Cris Collinsworth and Michele Tafoya

Game information

**First quarter**

- NO – Marques Colston 14-yard pass from Drew Brees (John Kasay kick), 9:02. Saints 7–0. **Drive: 6 plays, 41 yards, 2:59.**
- NO – Marques Colston 4-yard pass from Drew Brees (John Kasay kick), 5:31. Saints 14–0. **Drive: 6 plays, 81 yards, 1:39.**
- NO – Darren Sproles 6-yard pass from Drew Brees (John Kasay kick), 0:42. Saints 21–0. **Drive: 8 plays, 22 yards, 3:42.**

**Second quarter**

- NO – Jed Collins 1-yard run (John Kasay kick), 10:39. Saints 28–0. **Drive: 7 plays, 69 yards, 3:51.**
- NO – John Kasay 23-yard field goal, 4:20. Saints 31–0. **Drive: 11 plays, 48 yards, 5:28.**
- IND – Delone Carter 2-yard run (Adam Vinatieri kick), 1:56. Saints 31–7. **Drive: 7 plays, 80 yards, 2:24.**
- NO – John Kasay 47-yard field goal, 0:00. Saints 34–7. **Drive: 7 plays, 53 yards, 1:56.**

**Third quarter**

- NO – Jimmy Graham 4-yard pass from Drew Brees (John Kasay kick), 9:16. Saints 41–7. **Drive: 10 plays, 75 yards, 5:44.**
- NO – Jimmy Graham 2-yard pass from Drew Brees (John Kasay kick), 1:41. Saints 48–7. **Drive: 10 plays, 60 yards, 6:05.**

**Fourth quarter**

- NO – Darren Sproles 16-yard run (John Kasay kick), 12:26. Saints 55–7. **Drive: 6 plays, 58 yards, 2:58.**
- NO – Leigh Torrence 42-yard interception return (John Kasay kick), 12:12. Saints 62–7.

**Top passers**

- IND – Curtis Painter – 9/17, 67 yards, INT
- NO – Drew Brees – 31/35, 325 yards, 5 TD

**Top rushers**

- IND – Delone Carter – 10 rushes, 89 yards, TD
- NO – Mark Ingram II – 14 rushes, 91 yards

**Top receivers**

- IND – Reggie Wayne – 3 receptions, 36 yards
- NO – Marques Colston – 7 receptions, 98 yards, 2 TD

In a rematch of Super Bowl XLIV on SNF, the Colts traveled to New Orleans to take on the Saints. The Saints quickly got on the board as Drew Brees threw 3 touchdown passes in the first quarter alone, twice to Marques Colston from 14 and 4 yards out for 7–0 and 14–0 leads and once to Darren Sproles for a 21–0 lead. They eventually moved ahead 31–0 in the 2nd quarter as Jed Collins ran for a 1-yard touchdown followed by John Kasay nailing a 23-yard field goal. The Colts finally got on the board as Delone Carter ran for a touchdown from 2 yards out, making the score 31–7. Kasay then kicked a 47-yard field goal to give the Saints a 34–7 lead at halftime. In the 2nd half, the Saints scored 4 consecutive touchdowns with Brees hooking up with Jimmy Graham on 4-yard and 2-yard scores to increase their lead to 41–7 and then 48–7 in the 3rd quarter. In the 4th quarter, Sproles ran for a 16-yard touchdown, making the score 55–7, while Leigh Torrence returned an interception 42 yards for a touchdown for a final score of 62–7.

The Colts' loss was the most lopsided game of the 2011 NFL season and the first time a team had allowed 60 or more points since January 2000, when the Jacksonville Jaguars humiliated the Miami Dolphins by the same score in the divisional round playoffs. It was the worst loss in franchise history in terms of margin (55) and points allowed (62).

With this loss, the Colts dropped to 0–7.

==== Week 8: at Tennessee Titans ====
Week Eight: Indianapolis Colts at Tennessee Titans – Game summary

Quarter	1	2	3	4	Total
Colts	0	0	3	7	**10**
**Titans**	3	17	0	7	**27**

at LP Field, Nashville, Tennessee

- Date: October 30
- Game time: 1:00 p.m. EDT/12:00 p.m. CDT
- Game weather: Sunny, 62 °F or 16.7 °C
- Game attendance: 69,143
- Referee: Jerome Boger
- TV announcers (CBS): Kevin Harlan and Solomon Wilcots

Game information

**First quarter**

- TEN – Rob Bironas 51-yard field goal, 7:01. Titans 3–0. **Drive: 10 plays, 52 yards, 5:09.**

**Second quarter**

- TEN – Jason McCourty blocked punt recovery in end zone (Rob Bironas kick), 9:52. Titans 10–0.
- TEN – Rob Bironas 50-yard field goal, 2:31. Titans 13–0. **Drive: 7 plays, 28 yards, 2:28.**
- TEN – Nate Washington 3-yard run (Rob Bironas kick), 0:22. Titans 20–0. **Drive: 7 plays, 64 yards, 1:28.**

**Third quarter**

- IND – Adam Vinatieri 22-yard field goal, 7:41. Titans 20–3. **Drive: 13 plays, 58 yards, 5:25.**

**Fourth quarter**

- IND – Donald Brown 4-yard run (Adam Vinatieri kick), 13:29. Titans 20–10. **Drive: 11 plays, 80 yards, 3:44.**
- TEN – Nate Washington 14-yard pass from Matt Hasselbeck (Rob Bironas kick), 5:20. Titans 27–10. **Drive: 7 plays, 38 yards, 2:58.**

**Top passers**

- IND – Curtis Painter – 26/49, 250 yards, 2 INT
- TEN – Matt Hasselbeck – 23/33, 224 yards, TD

**Top rushers**

- IND – Curtis Painter – 7 rushes, 79 yards
- TEN – Javon Ringer – 14 rushes, 60 yards

**Top receivers**

- IND – Dallas Clark – 6 receptions, 77 yards
- TEN – Damian Williams – 4 receptions, 60 yards

After a huge loss at the Saints, the Colts traveled to Nashville to take on the Titans. The Titans scored 20 unanswered points in the first half as Rob Bironas kicked a 51-yard field goal for a 3–0 lead in the first quarter, and in the 2nd quarter, Jason McCourty recovered a blocked punt in the end zone, sending the game to 10–0, followed up by Bironas nailing a 50-yard field goal for 13–0, and the eventual halftime lead of 20–0 when Nate Washington ran for a 3-yard touchdown. The Colts managed to get on the board as Adam Vinatieri kicked a 22-yard field goal for a 20–3 score. Donald Brown managed to increase the Colts' points with a 4-yard touchdown run for a 20–10 score. The Titans however wrapped the game up when Washington ran for a 14-yard touchdown, making the final score 27–10. With the loss, the Colts fell to 0–8.

==== Week 9: vs. Atlanta Falcons ====
Week Nine: Atlanta Falcons at Indianapolis Colts – Game summary

Quarter	1	2	3	4	Total
**Falcons**	14	7	7	3	**31**
Colts	0	7	0	0	**7**

at Lucas Oil Stadium, Indianapolis, Indiana

- Date: November 6
- Game time: 1:00 p.m. EST
- Game weather: Sunny, 57 °F or 13.9 °C (retractable roof open)
- Game attendance: 65,218
- Referee: Mike Carey
- TV announcers (Fox): Ron Pitts and Jim Mora, Jr.

Game information

**First quarter**

- ATL – Michael Turner 1-yard run (Matt Bryant kick), 11:38. Falcons 7–0. **Drive: 5 plays, 26 yards, 2:38.**
- ATL – Julio Jones 50-yard pass from Matt Ryan (Matt Bryant kick), 2:51. Falcons 14–0. **Drive: 3 plays, 79 yards, 1:34.**

**Second quarter**

- ATL – Julio Jones 80-yard pass from Matt Ryan (Matt Bryant kick), 11:55. Falcons 21–0. **Drive: 3 plays, 87 yards, 1:34.**
- IND – Jerraud Powers 6-yard interception return (Adam Vinatieri kick), 7:47. Falcons 21–7.

**Third quarter**

- ATL – Tony Gonzalez 1-yard pass from Matt Ryan (Matt Bryant kick), 2:50. Falcons 28–7. **Drive: 12 plays, 73 yards, 7:32.**

**Fourth quarter**

- ATL – Matt Bryant 20-yard field goal, 10:15. Falcons 31–7. **Drive: 10 plays, 62 yards, 5:49.**

**Top passers**

- ATL – Matt Ryan – 14/24, 275 yards, 3 TD, INT
- IND – Curtis Painter – 13/27, 98 yards, INT

**Top rushers**

- ATL – Michael Turner – 19 rushes, 71 yards, TD
- IND – Donald Brown – 16 rushes, 70 yards

**Top receivers**

- ATL – Julio Jones – 3 receptions, 131 yards, 2 TD
- IND – Austin Collie – 4 receptions, 32 yards

After 2 straight losses on the road, the Colts returned home to take on the Falcons. The Falcons dominated, scoring 21 unanswered points as Michael Turner ran for a 1-yard touchdown for a 7–0 lead. Matt Ryan then found Julio Jones on a 50-yard touchdown pass, taking the game to 14–0 in the first quarter. In the 2nd quarter, Ryan and Jones hooked up again on an 80-yard pass, making the score 21–0. The Colts finally got on the board as Jerraud Powers returned an interception 6-yards for a touchdown, making the halftime score 21–7. In the 3rd quarter, Ryan hooked up with Tony Gonzalez for a 1-yard pass, increasing the Falcons' lead to 28–7. In the 4th quarter, Matt Bryant kicked a 20-yard field goal to give his team a final score of 31–7.

With the loss, the Colts fell to 0–9, giving them their first losing season since 2001. With the Dolphins' win over the Chiefs that same week, the Colts became the league's only team without a win.

==== Week 10: vs. Jacksonville Jaguars ====
Week Ten: Jacksonville Jaguars at Indianapolis Colts – Game summary

Quarter	1	2	3	4	Total
**Jaguars**	3	0	7	7	**17**
Colts	0	3	0	0	**3**

at Lucas Oil Stadium, Indianapolis, Indiana

- Date: November 13
- Game time: 1:00 p.m. EST
- Game weather: None (retractable roof closed)
- Game attendance: 64,619
- Referee: Jeff Triplette
- TV announcers (CBS): Spero Dedes and Steve Beuerlein

Game information

**First quarter**

- JAX – Josh Scobee 44-yard field goal, 2:44. Jaguars 3–0. **Drive: 8 plays, 35 yards, 4:44.**

**Second quarter**

- IND – Adam Vinatieri 42-yard field goal, 14:20. Tied 3–3. **Drive: 8 plays, 60 yards, 3:24.**

**Third quarter**

- JAX – Jarett Dillard 11-yard pass from Blaine Gabbert (Josh Scobee kick), 1:49. Jaguars 10–3. **Drive: 16 plays, 91 yards, 9:40.**

**Fourth quarter**

- JAX – Maurice Jones-Drew 3-yard run (Josh Scobee kick), 3:52. Jaguars 17–3. **Drive: 3 plays, 8 yards, 0:56.**

**Top passers**

- JAX – Blaine Gabbert – 14/21, 118 yards, TD, INT
- IND – Curtis Painter – 13/19, 94 yards, 2 INT

**Top rushers**

- JAX – Maurice Jones-Drew – 25 rushes, 114 yards, TD
- IND – Donald Brown – 14 rushes, 53 yards

**Top receivers**

- JAX – Chastin West – 3 receptions, 39 yards
- IND – Jacob Tamme – 6 receptions, 75 yards

The Colts stayed home and took on the Jaguars. The Jags managed to score early in the 1st quarter as Josh Scobee kicked a 44-yard field goal for a 3–0 lead. In the 2nd quarter, the Colts got on the board as Adam Vinatieri tied the game 3–3 with a 42-yard field goal. This was eventually the halftime score. Once again, the Colts found themselves being overpowered in the 2nd half of a game as Blaine Gabbert hooked up with Jarett Dillard on an 11-yard touchdown pass to send the game to a 10–3 score in the 3rd quarter followed up by Maurice Jones-Drew running for a 3-yard touchdown to make the final score 17–3.

With the loss, the Colts entered their bye week at 0–10.

==== Week 12: vs. Carolina Panthers ====
Week Twelve: Carolina Panthers at Indianapolis Colts – Game summary

Quarter	1	2	3	4	Total
**Panthers**	3	7	7	10	**27**
Colts	0	10	3	6	**19**

at Lucas Oil Stadium, Indianapolis, Indiana

- Date: November 27
- Game time: 1:00 p.m. EST
- Game weather: None (retractable roof closed)
- Game attendance: 63,928
- Referee: Tony Corrente
- TV announcers (Fox): Chris Myers, Tim Ryan and Jaime Maggio

Game information

**First quarter**

- CAR – Olindo Mare 40-yard field goal, 4:07. Panthers 3–0. **Drive: 10 plays, 33 yards, 5:18.**

**Second quarter**

- CAR – Cam Newton 14-yard run (Olindo Mare kick), 14:03. Panthers 10–0. **Drive: 6 plays, 62 yards, 3:08.**
- IND – Donald Brown 17-yard run (Adam Vinatieri kick), 12:08. Panthers 10–7. **Drive: 4 plays, 80 yards, 1:55.**
- IND – Adam Vinatieri 43-yard field goal, 1:46. Tied 10–10. **Drive: 8 plays, 34 yards, 2:27.**

**Third quarter**

- CAR – DeAngelo Williams 25-yard run (Olindo Mare kick), 9:13. Panthers 17–10. **Drive: 7 plays, 64 yards, 4:16.**
- IND – Adam Vinatieri 31-yard field goal, 0:32. Panthers 17–13. **Drive: 6 plays, 48 yards, 4:20.**

**Fourth quarter**

- CAR – DeAngelo Williams 2-yard run (Olindo Mare kick), 10:23. Panthers 24–13. **Drive: 8 plays, 79 yards, 5:09.**
- IND – Reggie Wayne 56-yard pass from Curtis Painter (pass failed), 8:16. Panthers 24–19. **Drive: 6 plays, 80 yards, 2:07.**
- CAR – Olindo Mare 41-yard field goal, 5:53. Panthers 27–19. **Drive: 4 plays, 9 yards, 2:23.**

**Top passers**

- CAR – Cam Newton – 20/27, 208 yards
- IND – Curtis Painter – 15/29, 226 yards, TD, 2 INT

**Top rushers**

- CAR – Jonathan Stewart – 10 rushes, 70 yards
- IND – Donald Brown – 14 rushes, 80 yards, TD

**Top receivers**

- CAR – Steve Smith Sr. – 3 receptions, 68 yards
- IND – Reggie Wayne – 5 receptions, 122 yards, TD

After a good rest on their bye week, the Colts stayed home for a game against the Panthers. In the first quarter the Panthers jumped to an early lead as Olindo Mare kicked a 30-yard field goal for a leading score of 3–0. They made it 10–0 in the 2nd quarter when Cam Newton ran for a touchdown from 14 yards out. The Colts got on the board when Donald Brown ran for a 17-yard touchdown, coming within 3 at 10–7. Following an Adam Vinatieri field goal from 43 yards out, the game was tied at halftime 10–10. In the 3rd quarter, the Panthers moved back into the lead as De'Angelo Williams ran for a touchdown from 25-yards out, taking a 17–10 lead. The Colts came within 4 points as Vinatieri kicked a 30-yard field goal for a 17–13 game. In the 4th quarter, the Panthers moved ahead by double digits as Williams ran for a 2-yard touchdown for a 24–13 game. The Colts managed to move within 5 points as Curtis Painter found Reggie Wayne on a 56-yard pass (with a failed 2-point conversion) for a 24–19 game. The Panthers wrapped up the game when Mare kicked a 41-yard field goal, making the final score 27–19.

With the loss, the Colts dropped down to 0–11.

==== Week 13: at New England Patriots ====
Week Thirteen: Indianapolis Colts at New England Patriots – Game summary

Quarter	1	2	3	4	Total
Colts	0	3	0	21	**24**
**Patriots**	3	14	14	0	**31**

at Gillette Stadium, Foxborough, Massachusetts

- Date: December 4
- Game time: 1:00 p.m. EST
- Game weather: Cloudy, 51 °F or 10.6 °C
- Game attendance: 68,756
- Referee: Ron Winter
- TV announcers (CBS): Marv Albert and Rich Gannon

Game information

**First quarter**

- NE – Stephen Gostkowski 39-yard field goal, 9:30. Patriots 3–0. **Drive: 8 plays, 31 yards, 3:13.**

**Second quarter**

- IND – Adam Vinatieri 31-yard field goal, 14:11. Tied 3–3. **Drive: 19 plays, 71 yards, 10:19.**
- NE – Rob Gronkowski 11-yard pass from Tom Brady (Stephen Gostkowski kick), 2:57. Patriots 10–3. **Drive: 16 plays, 94 yards, 6:40.**
- NE – BenJarvus Green-Ellis 1-yard run (Stephen Gostkowski kick), 0:13. Patriots 17–3. **Drive: 6 plays, 54 yards, 1:21.**

**Third quarter**

- NE – Rob Gronskowski 21-yard pass from Tom Brady (Stephen Gostkowski kick), 12:16. Patriots 24–3. **Drive: 8 plays, 77 yards, 2:44.**
- NE – Rob Gronskowski 2-yard run (Stephen Gostkowski kick), 4:13. Patriots 31–3. **Drive: 9 plays, 66 yards, 3:59.**

**Fourth quarter**

- IND – Donald Brown 5-yard run (Adam Vinatieri kick), 10:24. Patriots 31–10. **Drive: 15 plays, 88 yards, 8:49.**
- IND – Pierre Garçon 33-yard pass from Dan Orlovsky (Adam Vinatieri kick), 2:21. Patriots 31–17. **Drive: 11 plays, 93 yards, 4:15.**
- IND – Pierre Garçon 12-yard pass from Dan Orlovsky (Adam Vinatieri kick), 0:36. Patriots 31–24. **Drive: 5 plays, 90 yards, 1:07.**

**Top passers**

- IND – Dan Orlovsky – 30/37, 353 yards, 2 TD, INT
- NE – Tom Brady – 29/38, 289 yards, 2 TD

**Top rushers**

- IND – Donald Brown – 14 rushes, 41 yards, TD
- NE – Stevan Ridley – 8 rushes, 33 yards

**Top receivers**

- IND – Pierre Garçon – 9 receptions, 150 yards, 2 TD
- NE – Wes Welker – 11 receptions, 110 yards

Despite putting up 21 points in the fourth quarter with Dan Orlovsky under center, the Colts again lost on the road to the New England Patriots.

With the loss, the Colts fell to 0–12 and became the ninth team in NFL history to start 0–12, and the third franchise after the Lions and Buccaneers to suffer this ignominy twice.

==== Week 14: at Baltimore Ravens ====
Week Fourteen: Indianapolis Colts at Baltimore Ravens – Game summary

Quarter	1	2	3	4	Total
Colts	0	3	0	7	**10**
**Ravens**	10	7	7	0	**24**

at M&T Bank Stadium, Baltimore, Maryland

- Date: December 11
- Game time: 1:00 p.m. EST
- Game weather: Sunny, 43 °F or 6.1 °C
- Game attendance: 71,187
- Referee: Clete Blakeman
- TV announcers (CBS): Bill Macatee and Steve Tasker

Game information

**First quarter**

- BAL – Torrey Smith 8-yard pass from Joe Flacco (Billy Cundiff kick), 10:09. Ravens 7–0. **Drive: 6 plays, 40 yards, 3:23.**
- BAL – Billy Cundiff 36-yard field goal, 1:20. Ravens 10–0. **Drive: 13 plays, 71 yards, 6:40.**

**Second quarter**

- BAL – Ray Rice 6-yard run (Billy Cundiff kick), 10:07. Ravens 17–0. **Drive: 10 plays, 69 yards, 4:39.**
- IND – Adam Vinatieri 22-yard field goal, 3:06. Ravens 17–3. **Drive: 13 plays, 29 yards, 7:01.**

**Third quarter**

- BAL – Dennis Pitta 7-yard pass from Joe Flacco (Billy Cundiff kick), 3:41. Ravens 24–3. **Drive: 8 plays, 68 yards, 4:26.**

**Fourth quarter**

- IND – Jacob Tamme 13-yard pass from Dan Orlovsky (Adam Vinatieri kick), 0:00. Ravens 24–10. **Drive: 12 plays, 29 yards, 2:18.**

**Top passers**

- IND – Dan Orlovsky – 17/37, 136 yards, TD, INT
- BAL – Joe Flacco – 23/31, 227 yards, 2 TD, INT

**Top rushers**

- IND – Donald Brown – 9 rushes, 28 yards
- BAL – Ray Rice – 26 rushes, 103 yards, TD

**Top receivers**

- IND – Pierre Garçon – 5 receptions, 46 yards
- BAL – Anquan Boldin – 5 receptions, 57 yards

With this loss, the Colts fell to 0–13 and became the sixth team in NFL history to start a season at 0–13, and the first franchise to suffer this ignominy on multiple occasions. (Note: The previous five had been the 1976 Tampa Bay Buccaneers, the 1980 New Orleans Saints, the 1986 Indianapolis Colts, the 2007 Miami Dolphins, and the 2008 Detroit Lions. They would later on be joined by the 2016 and 2017 Browns, and the 2020 Jets.)

==== Week 15: vs. Tennessee Titans ====
Week Fifteen: Tennessee Titans at Indianapolis Colts – Game summary

Quarter	1	2	3	4	Total
Titans	0	6	0	7	**13**
**Colts**	3	0	14	10	**27**

at Lucas Oil Stadium, Indianapolis, Indiana

- Date: December 18
- Game time: 1:00 p.m. EST
- Game weather: None (retractable roof closed)
- Game attendance: 64,271
- Referee: Pete Morelli
- TV announcers (CBS): Ian Eagle and Dan Fouts

Game information

**First quarter**

- IND – Adam Vinatieri 47-yard field goal, 1:11. Colts 3–0. **Drive: 11 plays, 56 yards, 4:47.**

**Second quarter**

- TEN – Rob Bironas 53-yard field goal, 5:37. Tied 3–3. **Drive: 5 plays, 18 yards, 2:23.**
- TEN – Rob Bironas 21-yard field goal, 0:25. Titans 6–3. **Drive: 9 plays, 45 yards, 2:17.**

**Third quarter**

- IND – Reggie Wayne 18-yard pass from Dan Orlovsky (Adam Vinatieri kick), 9:45. Colts 10–6. **Drive: 7 plays, 43 yards, 3:51.**
- IND – Jacob Lacey 32-yard interception return (Adam Vinatieri kick), 6:41. Colts 17–6.

**Fourth quarter**

- IND – Adam Vinatieri 40-yard field goal, 12:59. Colts 20–6. **Drive: 7 plays, 58 yards, 3:40.**
- TEN – Nate Washington 7-yard pass from Jake Locker (Rob Bironas kick), 3:48. Colts 20–13. **Drive: 8 plays, 69 yards, 2:30.**
- IND – Donald Brown 80-yard run (Adam Vinatieri kick), 3:43. Colts 27–13. **Drive: 1 play, 80 yards, 0:17.**

**Top passers**

- TEN – Matt Hasselbeck – 27/40 223 yards, 2 INT
- IND – Dan Orlovsky – 11/17 82 yards, TD

**Top rushers**

- TEN – Chris Johnson – 15 rushes, 55 yards
- IND – Donald Brown – 16 rushes, 161 yards, TD

**Top receivers**

- TEN – Jared Cook – 9 receptions, 103 yards
- IND – Reggie Wayne – 3 receptions, 33 yards, TD

After starting 0–13 and looking most likely to become the second team in NFL history to go 0–16 after the 2008 Detroit Lions, the Colts finally won a game. Having a career day, Donald Brown and a strong defense denied Tennessee any hope of a win as the team improved to 1–13, allowing them to avoid becoming the third team in post-merger NFL history to finish a season winless, after the 2008 Lions and the 1976 Tampa Bay Buccaneers. The victory also ended the possibility of the 2011 season becoming the first in NFL history to feature both an undefeated and winless team in one season, (Note: The 1934 and 1942 NFL seasons featured both a winless team (the 1934 Cincinnati Reds and 1942 Detroit Lions) and an undefeated regular season (the Chicago Bears in both cases); however on both occasions the Bears lost the NFL Championship game to miss a perfect season.) as the Green Bay Packers lost the same day to the Kansas City Chiefs after a 13–0 start.

==== Week 16: vs. Houston Texans ====
Week Sixteen: Houston Texans at Indianapolis Colts – Game summary

Quarter	1	2	3	4	Total
Texans	10	0	3	3	**16**
**Colts**	3	3	3	10	**19**

at Lucas Oil Stadium, Indianapolis, Indiana

- Date: December 22
- Game time: 8:20 p.m. EST
- Game weather: None (retractable roof closed)
- Game attendance: 64,159
- Referee: Jerome Boger
- TV announcers (NFLN): Brad Nessler, Mike Mayock and Alex Flanagan
- Recap

Game information

**First quarter**

- HOU - (14:11) Arian Foster 9-yard run (Neil Rackers kick), Texans 0–7, **Drive: 2 plays, 17 yards, :45.**
- IND - (4:43) Adam Vinatieri 23-yard field goal, Texans 3–7, **Drive: 7 plays, 22 yards, 3:36.**
- HOU - (2:06) Neil Rackers 44-yard field goal, Texans 3–10, **Drive: 6 plays, 54 yards, 2:37.**

**Second quarter**

- IND - (3:41) Adam Vinatieri 32-yard field goal, Texans 6–10, **Drive: 7 plays, 47 yards, 3:39.**

**Third quarter**

- HOU - (10:30) Neil Rackers 35-yard field goal, Texans 6–13, **Drive: 8 plays, 63 yards, 4:35.**
- IND - (:59) Adam Vinatieri 47-yard field goal, Texans 9–13, **Drive: 12 plays, 51 yards, 5:11.**

**Fourth quarter**

- IND - (6:52) Adam Vinatieri 31-yard field goal, Texans 12–13, **Drive: 11 plays, 67 yards, 6:08.**
- HOU - (2:00) Neil Rackers 31-yard field goal, Texans 12–16, **Drive: 11 plays, 67 yards, 4:52.**
- IND - (:24) Reggie Wayne 1-yard reception from Dan Orlovsky (Adam Vinatieri kick), Colts 19–16, **Drive: 12 plays, 78 yards, 1:37.**

**Top passers**

- HOU – T. J. Yates – 13/16 132 yards
- IND – Dan Orlovsky – 23/41 244 yards, TD

**Top rushers**

- HOU – Arian Foster – 23 rushes, 158 yards, TD
- IND – Joseph Addai – 19 rushes, 59 yards

**Top receivers**

- HOU – Joel Dreessen – 4 receptions, 38 yards
- IND – Reggie Wayne – 8 receptions, 106 yards, TD

With the win, the Colts improved to 2–13 and retained their perfect 10–0 record against the Texans at home.

==== Week 17: at Jacksonville Jaguars ====
Week Seventeen: Indianapolis Colts at Jacksonville Jaguars – Game summary

Quarter	1	2	3	4	Total
Colts	0	3	3	7	**13**
**Jaguars**	7	3	6	3	**19**

at EverBank Field, Jacksonville, Florida

- Date: January 1
- Game time: 1:00 p.m. EST
- Game weather: Chance of rain, 70 °F or 21.1 °C
- Game attendance: 62,481
- Referee: John Parry
- TV announcers (CBS): Spero Dedes and Steve Beuerlein

Game information

**First quarter**

- JAX – Chastin West 23-yard pass from Blaine Gabbert (Josh Scobee kick), 3:10. Jaguars 7–0. **Drive: 6 plays, 35 yards, 3:19.**

**Second quarter**

- IND – Adam Vinatieri 48-yard field goal, 12:03. Jaguars 7–3. **Drive: 14 plays, 54 yards, 6:07.**
- JAX – Josh Scobee 25-yard field goal, 1:01. Jaguars 10–3. **Drive: 9 plays, 56 yards, 4:49.**

**Third quarter**

- IND – Adam Vinatieri 20-yard field goal, 9:07. Jaguars 10–6. **Drive: 13 plays, 78 yards, 5:53.**
- JAX – Josh Scobee 32-yard field goal, 7:33. Jaguars 13–6. **Drive: 5 plays, 57 yards, 1:34.**
- JAX – Josh Scobee 47-yard field goal, 5:52. Jaguars 16–6. **Drive: 4 plays, -10 yards, 0:48.**

**Fourth quarter**

- JAX – Josh Scobee 39-yard field goal, 6:35. Jaguars 19–6. **Drive: 7 plays, 25 yards, 4:08.**
- IND – Austin Collie 12-yard pass from Dan Orlovsky (Adam Vinatieri kick), 3:22. Jaguars 19–13. **Drive: 8 plays, 82 yards, 3:08.**

**Top passers**

- IND – Dan Orlovsky – 27/40, 264 yards, TD, 2 INT
- JAX – Blaine Gabbert – 11/19, 92 yards, TD

**Top rushers**

- IND – Donald Brown – 8 rushes, 24 yards
- JAX – Maurice Jones-Drew – 25 rushes, 169 yards

**Top receivers**

- IND – Austin Collie – 9 receptions, 96 yards, TD
- JAX – Marcedes Lewis – 3 receptions, 33 yards

With the loss, the Colts finished the season at 2–14 and were swept by the Jaguars for the first time in franchise history. The Jaguars became the first division rival to sweep the Colts since the Tennessee Titans did so in 2002. This was the first season ever when the Jaguars swept the Colts as division rivals, and became the only team to do so this season after the Colts gained their only two wins for the season at home against the Texans (who were 0–10 in Indianapolis by 2011) and Titans.

Since the NFL moved to a sixteen-game season in 1978, the Colts had now suffered the most seasons with three or fewer wins (six, in 1981, 1986, 1991, 1997, 1998 and 2011, plus a winless strike-shortened season in 1982) of any NFL franchise. (Note: The Detroit Lions, Cincinnati Bengals and Tampa Bay Buccaneers had previously shared their record of five seasons since 1978 with three or fewer wins. The Buccaneers would tie the Colts' record with their 2–14 2014 season, then with their 4–44 three-season record from 2015 to 2017, the Cleveland Browns subsequently tied the Colts’ unwanted record, having previously finished 3–13 or worse in 1990, 1999 and 2000.) The Colts also had the worst record of any AFC team since the Kansas City Chiefs in 2008.

With this final loss, the Colts ended their 2011 season tied with the St. Louis Rams for the worst record in the NFL, thereby earning the right to the first overall pick in the 2012 NFL draft due to a tiebreaker. This pick was the highest draft pick the Colts had had since 1998, when they selected Peyton Manning with the first overall pick, and the fourth time the Indianapolis-era Colts had the first overall pick.

== Standings ==
=== Division ===
AFC South
	W	L	T	PCT	DIV	CONF	PF	PA	STK
^{(3)} Houston Texans	10	6	0	.625	4–2	8–4	381	278	L3
Tennessee Titans	9	7	0	.563	3–3	7–5	325	317	W2
Jacksonville Jaguars	5	11	0	.313	3–3	4–8	243	329	W1
Indianapolis Colts	2	14	0	.125	2–4	2–10	243	430	L1

=== Conference ===
AFC
#	Team	Division	W	L	T	PCT	DIV	CONF	SOS	SOV	STK
Division winners
1	New England Patriots	East	13	3	0	.813	5–1	10–2	.449	.423	W8
2 (Note: Baltimore clinched the AFC North title based on a head-to-head sweep over Pittsburgh.)	Baltimore Ravens	North	12	4	0	.750	6–0	9–3	.477	.484	W2
3	Houston Texans	South	10	6	0	.625	4–2	8–4	.453	.413	L3
4 (Note: Denver clinched the AFC West title instead of San Diego or Oakland based on common record (5–5 to San Diego's and Oakland's 4–6).)	Denver Broncos	West	8	8	0	.500	3–3	6–6	.520	.445	L3
Wild cards
5	Pittsburgh Steelers	North	12	4	0	.750	4–2	9–3	.492	.411	W2
6 (Note: Cincinnati clinched the AFC 6 seed instead of Tennessee based on a head-to-head victory.)	Cincinnati Bengals	North	9	7	0	.563	2–4	6–6	.492	.326	L1
Did not qualify for the postseason
7	Tennessee Titans	South	9	7	0	.563	3–3	7–5	.461	.396	W2
8 (Note: New York Jets finished ahead of San Diego based on head-to-head victory.)	New York Jets	East	8	8	0	.500	3–3	6–6	.500	.395	L3
9 (Note: San Diego finished ahead of Oakland in the AFC West based on conference record (7–5 to 6–6).)	San Diego Chargers	West	8	8	0	.500	3–3	7–5	.516	.430	W1
10	Oakland Raiders	West	8	8	0	.500	3–3	6–6	.504	.438	L1
11	Kansas City Chiefs	West	7	9	0	.438	3–3	4–8	.512	.464	W1
12 (Note: Miami finished ahead of Buffalo based on head-to-head sweep.)	Miami Dolphins	East	6	10	0	.375	3–3	5–7	.504	.417	W1
13	Buffalo Bills	East	6	10	0	.375	1–5	4–8	.520	.510	L1
14	Jacksonville Jaguars	South	5	11	0	.313	3–3	4–8	.500	.363	W1
15	Cleveland Browns	North	4	12	0	.250	0–6	3–9	.531	.313	L6
16	Indianapolis Colts	South	2	14	0	.125	2–4	2–10	.539	.594	L1
Tiebreakers (Note: When breaking ties for three or more teams under the NFL's rules, they are first broken within divisions, then comparing only the highest ranked remaining team from each division.)
