= Chris Prosinski =

American football player (born 1987)

No. 42, 33, 31, 43
- Position: Safety

Personal information
- Born: April 28, 1987 (age 39); Newcastle, Wyoming, U.S.
- Listed height: 6 ft 1 in (1.85 m)
- Listed weight: 213 lb (97 kg)

Career information
- High school: Buffalo (Buffalo, Wyoming)
- College: Wyoming
- NFL draft: 2011: 4th round, 121st overall pick

Career history
- Jacksonville Jaguars (2011–2014); Philadelphia Eagles (2014); Chicago Bears (2015–2017)

Awards and highlights
- 2× Second-team All-MW (2009, 2010)

Career NFL statistics
- Total tackles: 164
- Sacks: 1
- Interceptions: 1
- Pass deflections: 7
- Forced fumbles: 1
- Stats at Pro Football Reference

Chris Prosinski (born April 28, 1987) is an American former professional football player who was a safety in the National Football League (NFL). He played college football for the Wyoming Cowboys.

== Early life ==
Prosinski attended Buffalo High School in Buffalo, Wyoming, where he played football. He was the top-ranked football recruit in Wyoming in the class of 2006. He committed to play college football for the Wyoming Cowboys.

== College career ==
Prosinski was a senior captain at the University of Wyoming. He was voted second-team All-Mountain West Conference at the conclusion of the 2009 and 2010 seasons.

== Professional career ==
Pre-draft measurables
Height	Weight	40-yard dash	10-yard split	20-yard split	20-yard shuttle	Three-cone drill	Vertical jump	Broad jump	Bench press
6 ft 1 in (1.85 m)	201 lb (91 kg)	4.39 s	1.54 s	2.60 s	4.28 s	6.85 s	39.5 in (1.00 m)	11 ft 2 in (3.40 m)	14 reps
All values from Pro Day

=== Jacksonville Jaguars ===
The Jacksonville Jaguars selected Prosinski in the fourth round with the 121st overall pick in the 2011 NFL draft.

Prosinski was waived/injured on September 23, 2014.

=== Philadelphia Eagles ===
Prosinski was signed by the Philadelphia Eagles on November 3, 2014. He took the roster spot of DeMeco Ryans, who had suffered a season-ending injury one day earlier.

=== Chicago Bears ===
Prosinski was signed by the Chicago Bears on September 29, 2015. Prosinski recorded his first career sack against the Denver Broncos on November 22, 2015. Despite allowing a 48-yard touchdown on the first drive of the game, he ended it with six tackles and a sack. The following week, he led the team in tackles with nine, while also recording his first career forced fumble.

On March 25, 2016, Prosinski signed a one-year contract with the Chicago Bears worth $840,000. His base salary is $760,000 and his guaranteed signing bonus was $80,000.

On March 20, 2017, Prosinski re-signed with the Bears. He was placed on injured reserve on September 2, 2017. He was released on September 4, 2017. On November 30, 2017, Prosinski was re-signed by the Bears. He was placed on injured reserve on December 23, 2017, after suffering a concussion in Week 15. He was released with an injury settlement on December 28, 2017.

== NFL career statistics ==
Legend
**Bold**	Career high

Year	Team	Games		Tackles					Interceptions					Fumbles			
Year	Team	GP	GS	Cmb	Solo	Ast	Sck	TFL	Int	Yds	TD	Lng	PD	FF	FR	Yds	TD
2011	JAX	13	1	19	16	3	0.0	0	0	0	0	0	0	0	**1**	0	0
2012	JAX	**16**	**7**	**53**	**42**	**11**	0.0	0	**1**	**6**	0	**6**	**4**	0	0	0	0
2013	JAX	**16**	1	16	12	4	0.0	0	0	0	0	0	2	0	0	0	0
2014	JAX	3	0	5	2	3	0.0	**1**	0	0	0	0	0	0	0	0	0
2014	PHI	8	0	7	6	1	0.0	0	0	0	0	0	0	0	0	0	0
2015	CHI	13	5	31	25	6	**1.0**	0	0	0	0	0	0	**1**	**1**	0	0
2016	CHI	**16**	1	25	19	6	0.0	**1**	0	0	0	0	1	0	0	0	0
2017	CHI	3	3	8	5	3	0.0	0	0	0	0	0	0	0	0	0	0
		88	18	164	127	37	1.0	2	1	6	0	6	7	1	2	0	0

== Personal life ==
Prosinski attended Buffalo High School in Buffalo, Wyoming. On June 27, 2015, Prosinski married Miss Wyoming 2012, Lexie Madden.
