= Matt Murphy (guard) =

American football player (born 1989)

No. 66, 60
- Position: Guard

Personal information
- Born: July 27, 1989 (age 37); Lake Forest, California
- Listed height: 6 ft 4 in (1.93 m)
- Listed weight: 300 lb (136 kg)

Career information
- College: UNLV
- NFL draft: 2011: undrafted

Career history
- Atlanta Falcons (2011)*; Indianapolis Colts (2011–2012)*; Cincinnati Bengals (2012)*
- * Offseason or practice squad member only
- Stats at Pro Football Reference

Matthew Murphy (born July 27, 1989) is an American former football guard.

== Career ==
After playing college football for UNLV, he was signed by the Atlanta Falcons as an undrafted free agent on July 27, 2011. On September 28, 2011, he was signed to the Indianapolis Colts' practice squad, then claimed by waiver by the Cincinnati Bengals in May 2012. On August 24, 2012, Murphy was waived by the Bengals.
