= Kevin Rutland =

American football player (born 1988)

No. 22, 35
- Position: Cornerback

Personal information
- Born: April 2, 1988 (age 38); Houston, Texas, U.S.
- Listed height: 6 ft 0 in (1.83 m)
- Listed weight: 193 lb (88 kg)

Career information
- High school: North Shore Senior (Houston)
- College: Missouri
- NFL draft: 2011: undrafted

Career history
- Jacksonville Jaguars (2011–2012); Kansas City Chiefs (2014)*; Toronto Argonauts (2015)*
- * Offseason or practice squad member only

Career NFL statistics
- Games played: 27
- Total tackles: 31
- Pass deflections: 1
- Interceptions: 1
- Stats at Pro Football Reference

Kevin Rutland (born April 2, 1988) is an American former professional football player who was a cornerback in the National Football League (NFL). He played college football for the Missouri Tigers and was signed by the Jacksonville Jaguars as an undrafted free agent in 2011.

== Professional career ==
=== Jacksonville Jaguars ===
Rutland was signed as an undrafted free agent in 2011. He was released by the Jaguars on October 15, 2012, and re-signed on October 26.

He was waived/injured on August 30, 2013, and waived on September 6.

=== Kansas City Chiefs ===
Rutland signed with the Chiefs on January 1, 2014. The Chiefs waived Rutland on August 26, 2014.

=== Toronto Argonauts ===
On October 8, 2015, Rutland was signed to the practice roster of the Toronto Argonauts of the Canadian Football League. He was released by the Argonauts on November 16, 2015.
