= Austin Collie =

American football player (born 1985)

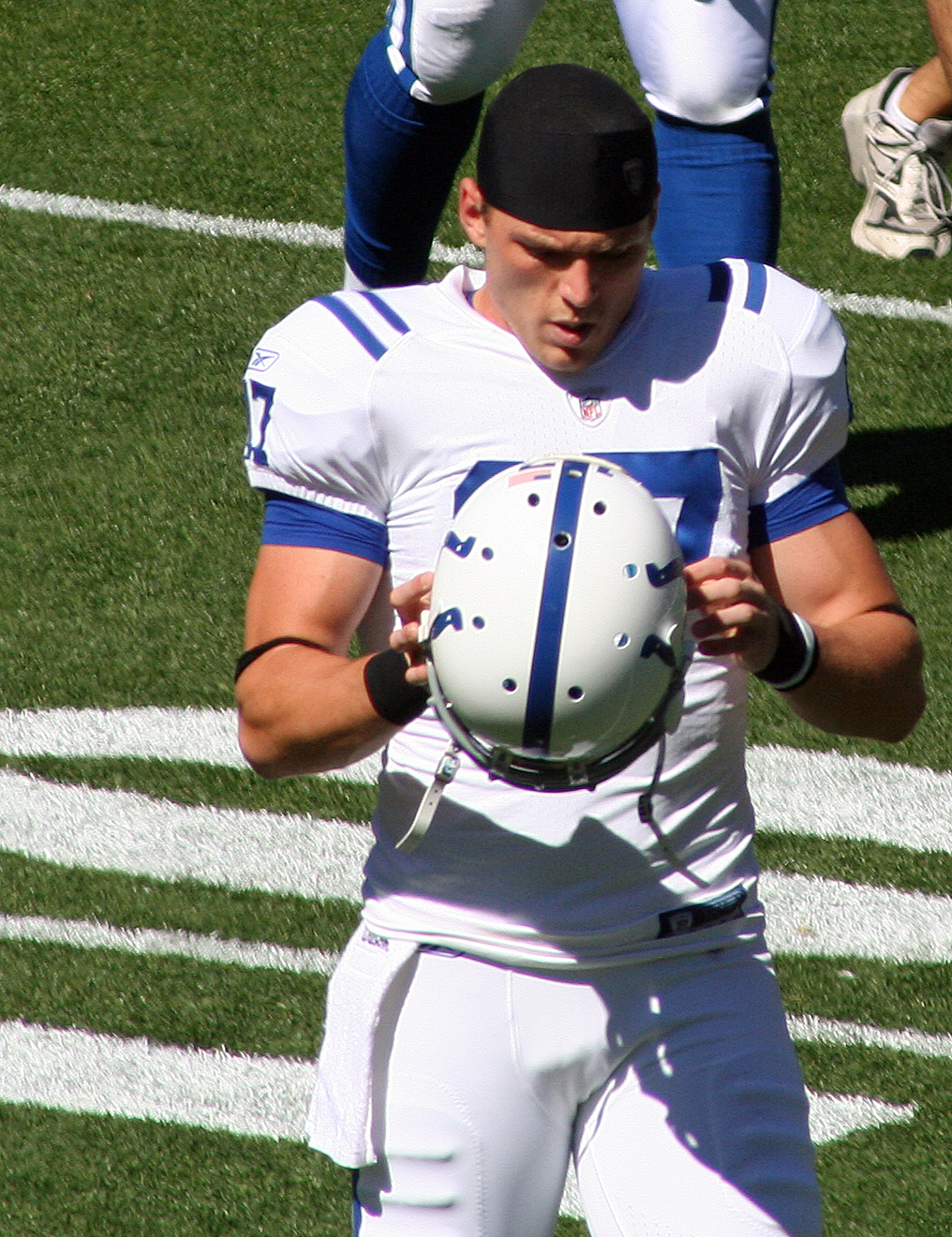
- Collie with the Indianapolis Colts in 2010

No. 17, 10
- Position: Wide receiver

Personal information
- Born: November 11, 1985 (age 41); Hamilton, Ontario, Canada
- Listed height: 6 ft 1 in (1.85 m)
- Listed weight: 204 lb (93 kg)

Career information
- High school: Oak Ridge (El Dorado Hills, California, U.S.)
- College: BYU (2004, 2007–2008)
- NFL draft: 2009: 4th round, 127th overall pick

Career history
- Indianapolis Colts (2009–2012); San Francisco 49ers (2013)*; New England Patriots (2013); BC Lions (2015)
- * Offseason or practice squad member only

Awards and highlights
- PFWA All-Rookie Team (2009); Second-team All-American (2008); MW Freshman of the Year (2004); First-team All-MW (2008); Second-team All-MW (2007)

Career NFL statistics
- Receptions: 179
- Receiving yards: 1,908
- Receiving touchdowns: 16
- Stats at Pro Football Reference
- Stats at CFL.ca (archive)

Austin Kirk Collie (born November 11, 1985) is a Canadian-born American former professional football player who was a wide receiver in the National Football League (NFL). He played college football for the BYU Cougars and was selected by the Indianapolis Colts in the fourth round of the 2009 NFL draft. Collie also played in the NFL for the New England Patriots and in the Canadian Football League (CFL) for the BC Lions.

== Early life ==
Collie was born in Hamilton, Ontario, Canada, to American parents Scott and Nicole Collie. Scott Collie also played football at Brigham Young University (BYU) from 1979 to 1982 and played professionally in the Canadian Football League (CFL) for the Hamilton Tiger-Cats and briefly in the NFL for the San Francisco 49ers during the 1983 preseason.

Collie starred as a wide receiver at Oak Ridge High School in El Dorado Hills, California, and garnered many awards. He was a PrepStar and SuperPrep All-American as well as being voted Northern California's Most Valuable Player. During his senior season, he recorded 60 receptions for a total of 978 yards and 18 touchdowns. In 2004, Collie became an Eagle Scout.

In December 2009, Collie's hometown newspaper, The Sacramento Bee, named him Sacramento Area's Player of the Decade (2000–2009).

== College career ==
In 2004, Collie was named MWC Freshman of the Year. He was also named the MVP of the 2007 Las Vegas Bowl and named to the All-MWC first-team in 2008.

Collie set a series of records during his three-year career at BYU (2004, 2007–2008).

Reception records in BYU Cougars football history
Category	Amount	BYU All-time Rank
Career receptions	215	2nd (Dennis Pitta - 221)
Career receiving yards	3,255	1st
Career receiving touchdowns	30	1st

Additionally, Collie was also one of the highest rated wide receivers in college football during his junior season in which he was selected to the college football All–American team.

2008 NCAA receiving records
Category	Number	NCAA Rank, 2008
Receiving yards per game	118.31	1st
Total yards receiving	1538	1st
Consecutive 100-yard receiving games	11	Tied for 1st (Michael Crabtree)
Receiving yards per catch	14.51	3rd
Total receptions	106	3rd
Touchdowns receiving	15	4th
Total all–purpose yards (per game)	162.46	12th

On January 9, 2009, Collie announced in a press conference that he would forgo his senior year and enter the 2009 NFL draft. The Indianapolis Colts drafted him in the fourth round, 127th overall.

== Professional career ==
Pre-draft measurables
Height	Weight	Arm length	Hand span	40-yard dash	10-yard split	20-yard split	20-yard shuttle	Three-cone drill	Vertical jump	Broad jump	Bench press
6 ft 0 7/8 in (1.85 m)	200 lb (91 kg)	31 in (0.79 m)	9 in (0.23 m)	4.53 s	1.53 s	2.62 s	4.07 s	6.78 s	34 in (0.86 m)	10 ft 0 in (3.05 m)	17 reps
All measurables were taken at the NFL Scouting Combine/Pro Day

=== Indianapolis Colts ===
Collie impressed Indianapolis Colts Head Coach Jim Caldwell in the preseason and was placed third on the depth chart at the wide receiver position for the 2009 season, placing ahead of Pierre Garçon for the slot receiver position. However, Garçon jumped Collie on the depth chart shortly thereafter. Collie finished his rookie season in the NFL among the top statistical leaders for all rookies at the wide receiver position.

Collie started his second year strong, making numerous touchdown catches and establishing himself as Peyton Manning's "go-to guy" after Dallas Clark suffered a season-ending injury. However, on November 7, 2010, Collie was involved in a collision against the Philadelphia Eagles, in which he was hit on both sides of his head by Quintin Mikell and Kurt Coleman. Collie was taken off the field on a stretcher. According to a televised ESPN update, Collie was seen sitting up and moving after several minutes working with medics. Collie suffered a concussion as a result of the collision. Coleman was penalized for unnecessary roughness for the hit on Collie, but neither player was fined, as the NFL later ruled that the contact that caused the injury was incidental as a result of Mikell's initial hit. On December 19, Collie was hit in the head by Jaguars linebacker Daryl Smith and was down for several minutes. It was his second concussion-related injury that year and ultimately ended his 2010 season. Despite the fact that no fines were assessed, the highly visible injuries to Collie added to the debate about violent hits in football. On December 22, Collie was placed on injured reserve.

Collie played in all 16 games, making 5 starts, during the 2011 regular season, but managed to only catch one touchdown pass among his 54 receptions.

During a 2012 preseason game against the Pittsburgh Steelers, Collie suffered his third concussion of his career. During the third game of the 2012 season against the Jacksonville Jaguars, Collie suffered a ruptured patellar tendon in his right knee, causing him to miss the rest of the 2012 season.

On February 15, 2013, Collie was told he would not be re-signed by the Colts.

=== San Francisco 49ers ===
On August 2, 2013, the San Francisco 49ers signed Collie to a one-year contract. He was released on August 31, during final roster cuts.

=== New England Patriots ===
The New England Patriots signed Collie as a free agent on October 3, 2013. He was signed for a one-year, veteran-minimum contract, which was $715,000 but prorated to $546,765. Due to Collie's previous injuries, the contract included an injury waiver, meaning that the Patriots could release him if he were injured and only owe him a "split" (50%) of the contract. He was released on November 5, because of a knee injury, after only 3 catches for 34 yards. Collie was re-signed by the Patriots on December 5, to add depth as rookie wideouts Aaron Dobson and Kenbrell Thompkins dealt with nagging injuries. He was released once more on December 27, only to be re-signed on January 2, 2014. The Patriots released Collie again after the playoffs.

=== BC Lions ===
On January 29, 2015, the BC Lions of the Canadian Football League announced they had signed Collie to a contract. In his only CFL season, Collie played in 16 games, catching 43 passes for 439 yards with 7 touchdowns. Collie also recorded a touchdown as a passer, throwing a 21-yard score to quarterback Jonathon Jennings on a trick play.

On April 8, 2016, Collie announced his retirement from professional football.

== NFL career statistics ==
Year	Team	Games		Receiving					Rushing					Fumbles	
Year	Team	GP	GS	Rec	Yds	Avg	Lng	TD	Att	Yds	Avg	Lng	TD	Fum	Lost
2009	IND	16	5	60	676	11.3	39T	7	2	1	0.5	2	0	0	0
2010	IND	9	6	58	649	11.2	73T	8	0	0	0.0	0	0	1	1
2011	IND	16	5	54	514	9.5	27	1	0	0	0.0	0	0	0	0
2012	IND	1	0	1	6	6.0	6	0	0	0	0.0	0	0	0	0
2013	NE	7	1	6	63	10.5	19	0	0	0	0.0	0	0	0	0
Total		49	17	179	1,908	10.7	73	16	2	1	0.5	2	0	1	1

== Personal life ==
Collie took two years off BYU, 2005-2006, to serve a mission for the Church of Jesus Christ of Latter-day Saints in Buenos Aires, Argentina. Collie is married and has five kids. After retiring from professional football Collie joined Cognitive FX, a concussion treatment center in Provo, Utah.

== See also ==
- List of NCAA major college football yearly receiving leaders
