= Chastin West =

American football player (born 1987)

No. 17
- Position: Wide receiver

Personal information
- Born: May 1, 1987 (age 39); Inglewood, California, U.S.
- Listed height: 6 ft 1 in (1.85 m)
- Listed weight: 216 lb (98 kg)

Career information
- High school: Moorpark (CA)
- College: Fresno State
- NFL draft: 2010: undrafted

Career history
- Green Bay Packers (2010–2011)*; Jacksonville Jaguars (2011–2012); Detroit Lions (2013)*
- * Offseason or practice squad member only

Awards and highlights
- Super Bowl champion (XLV)

Career NFL statistics
- Receptions: 13
- Receiving yards: 163
- Receiving touchdowns: 2
- Stats at Pro Football Reference

Chastin Jareaux West (born May 1, 1987) is an American former professional football player who was a wide receiver in the National Football League (NFL). He played college football for the Fresno State Bulldogs. West was signed by the Green Bay Packers as an undrafted free agent in 2010. He was a part of the Packers' Super Bowl XLV championship team that beat the Pittsburgh Steelers. He was also a member of the Jacksonville Jaguars and Detroit Lions.

== College career ==
West was an all-purpose back his freshman season, recording at least ten rushes, receptions and kick returns. After not playing sophomore year, West returned as a junior still catching the ball and returning kicks, but not rushing the ball. Senior year, he took over punt returns but did not return kicks. Still, senior year was West's most productive year, finishing seventh in the Western Athletic Conference with 15.7 yards per catch. West totaled 81 receptions for 1051 yards and 45 kick returns for 958 yards while playing for Fresno State University.

== Professional career ==
=== Green Bay Packers ===
After going undrafted in the 2010 NFL draft, West signed with the Green Bay Packers on April 30, 2010. He earned a Super Bowl ring as a Practice squad member. He was cut by the Packers on September 3, 2011. Afterwards, West was signed to the Packers' practice squad the next day.

=== Jacksonville Jaguars ===
West was signed from the Packers practice squad by the Jacksonville Jaguars on September 20, 2011. He was released on August 25, 2012.

=== Detroit Lions ===
West signed a futures contract with the Detroit Lions on January 1, 2013.
