= David Caldwell (safety) =

American gridiron football player (born 1987)

No. 42
- Position: Safety

Personal information
- Born: May 19, 1987 (age 39); Montclair, New Jersey, U.S.
- Listed height: 5 ft 11 in (1.80 m)
- Listed weight: 212 lb (96 kg)

Career information
- College: William & Mary
- NFL draft: 2010: undrafted

Career history
- Indianapolis Colts (2010−2012); New York Giants (2013)*; Hamilton Tiger-Cats (2014–2016)
- * Offseason or practice squad member only

Career NFL statistics
- Total tackles: 64
- Stats at Pro Football Reference
- Stats at CFL.ca (archive)

David Alexander Caldwell (born May 19, 1987) is an American former professional football player who was a safety in the National Football League (NFL). He played college football for the William & Mary Tribe.

A native of Montclair, New Jersey, Caldwell graduated from Montclair High School before spending a postgraduate year at the Lawrenceville School.

== Professional career ==
=== Indianapolis Colts ===
After going undrafted in the 2010 NFL draft, Caldwell signed with the Indianapolis Colts as an undrafted free agent on April 30, 2010. He started 13 games at strong safety during the 2011 Regular Season and made 67 tackles.

On August 26, 2012, the Colts waived Caldwell and he is currently an NFL free agent.

=== New York Giants ===
On January 8, 2013, Caldwell signed with the New York Giants.

On August 31, 2013, Caldwell did not make the 53-man roster for the Giants, and was waived.

=== Hamilton Tiger-Cats ===
On March 28, 2014, he signed with the Hamilton Tiger-Cats.
