= 2010 Jacksonville Jaguars season =

16th season in franchise history

- Owner: Wayne Weaver
- General manager: Gene Smith
- Head coach: Jack Del Rio
- Offensive coordinator: Dirk Koetter
- Defensive coordinator: Mel Tucker
- Home stadium: EverBank Field

Results
- Record: 8–8
- Division place: 2nd AFC South
- Playoffs: Did not qualify
- Pro Bowlers: RB Maurice Jones-Drew; TE Marcedes Lewis; ST Montell Owens

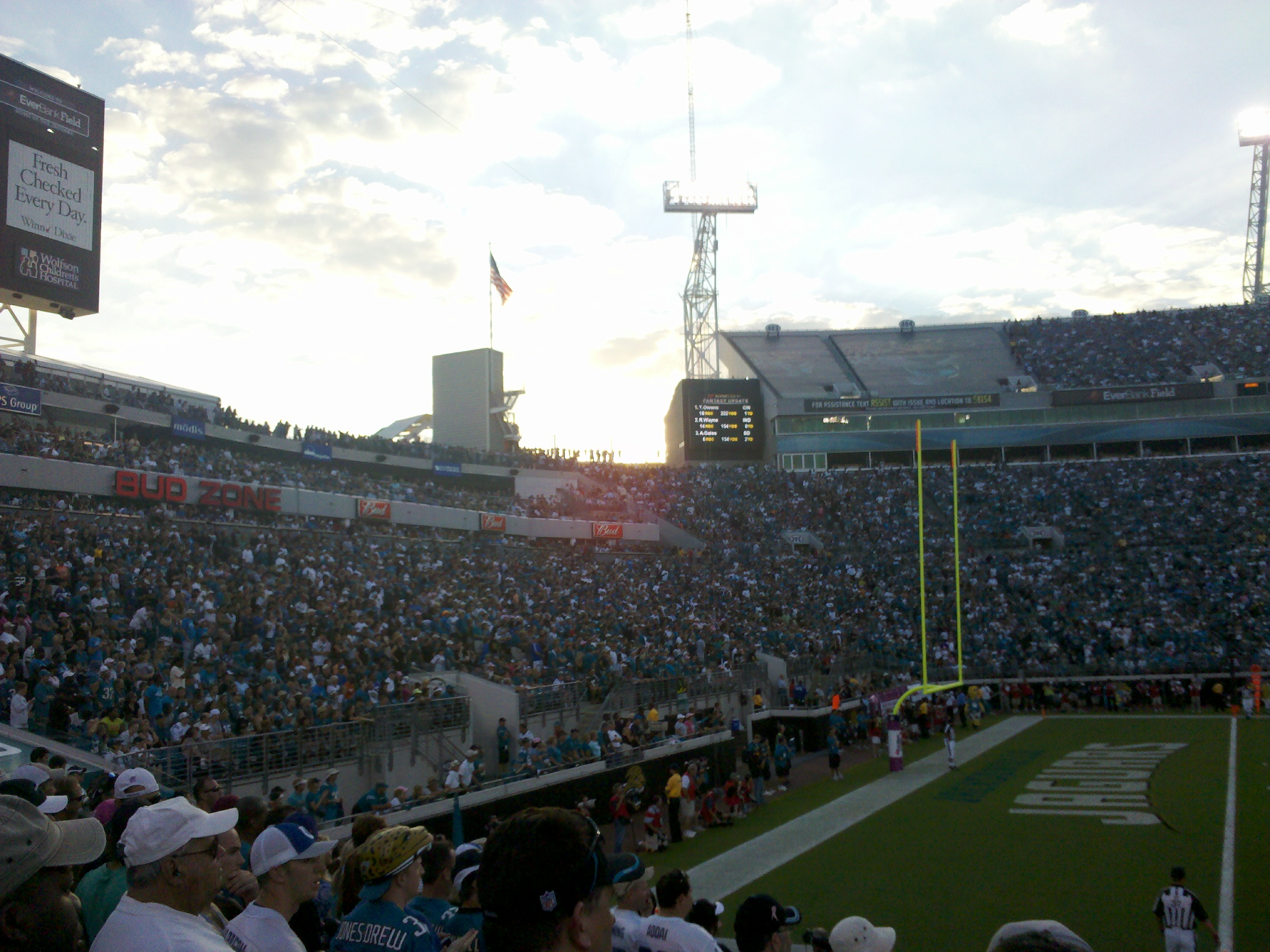
Jacksonville Jaguars vs Indianapolis Colts 2010

The 2010 season was the Jacksonville Jaguars' 16th in the National Football League (NFL) and their eighth under head coach Jack Del Rio. The Jaguars, who were in their second year of "rebuilding" under general manager Gene Smith, finished with an 8–8 record, marginally improving on their 7–9 record from 2009, but were eliminated from playoff contention for the third consecutive season, despite starting the season with an 8–5 record, and much like 2006, they would go on to lose their final three games. Although blackouts were a problem in 2009 for the franchise, they sold out all of their 2010 home games.

== Offseason ==
=== Notable transactions ===
==== Acquisitions ====
- WR Kassim Osgood, free agent signed on March 6, 2010.
- DE Aaron Kampman, free agent signed on March 7, 2010.
- LB Kirk Morrison, acquired in trade on April 24, 2010.
- LB Freddy Keiaho, free agent signed on April 30, 2010.
- G Justin Smiley, acquired in trade on May 25, 2010.

==== Departures ====
- WR Torry Holt, released on February 11, 2010.
- OT Tra Thomas, released on February 11, 2010.
- DT Rob Meier, released on February 11, 2010.
- DT John Henderson, released on April 26, 2010.
- LB Brian Iwuh, released on April 26, 2010.
- DT Montavious Stanley, released on April 26, 2010.
- LB Clint Ingram, declared free agent.
- RB Allen Patrick, released on May 25, 2010.
- DE Reggie Hayward, released on July 7, 2010.

==== Trades ====
- DE Quentin Groves was traded to the Oakland Raiders for a 5th round pick in the 2010 NFL draft.
- The Jaguars traded their 4th round pick (108 overall) to the Oakland Raiders for a 5th round pick (153 overall) and LB Kirk Morrison.
- The Jaguars traded their 5th round pick (158 overall) to the New Orleans Saints for a 4th round pick in the 2011 NFL draft.

=== NFL draft ===
2010 Jacksonville Jaguars draft
Round	Pick	Player	Position	College	Notes
1	10	Tyson Alualu	Defensive tackle	California	
3	74	D'Anthony Smith	Defensive tackle	Louisiana Tech	
5	143	Larry Hart	Linebacker	Central Arkansas	
5	153	Austen Lane	Defensive end	Murray State	
6	180	Deji Karim	Running back	Southern Illinois	
6	203	Scotty McGee	Kick returner	James Madison	
Made roster † Pro Football Hall of Fame * Made at least one Pro Bowl during career

== Staff ==
Jacksonville Jaguars 2010 staff
Front office: Chairman/CEO – Wayne Weaver; Senior vice president of football operations/general counsel – Paul Vance; General manager/senior vice president of player personnel – Gene Smith; Director of football administration – Tim Walsh; Director of player personnel – Terry McDonough; Assistant director of pro personnel – Louis Clark; Assistant director of college personnel – Tim Mingey; Head coaches: Head coach – Jack Del Rio; Offensive coaches: Offensive coordinator – Dirk Koetter; Quarterbacks – Mike Shula; Running backs – Earnest Byner; Wide receivers – Todd Monken; Tight ends – Rob Boras; Offensive line – Andy Heck; Assistant offensive line – Ron Heller; Offensive staff assistant – Matt Griffin; Offensive quality control – Johnny Cox	Defensive coaches: Defensive coordinator – Mel Tucker; Defensive line – Joe Cullen; Assistant defensive line – Ben Albert; Linebackers – Mark Duffner; Defensive backs – Cory Undlin; Assistant defensive backs – Thom Kaumeyer; Special teams coaches: Special teams coordinator – Russ Purnell; Assistant special teams – Nate Kaczor; Strength and conditioning: Strength and conditioning – Luke Richesson; Assistant strength and conditioning – Jason George; Strength staff assistant – Mike Eubanks; Strength staff assistant – Anthony Lomando

== Final roster ==
2010 Jacksonville Jaguars roster
Quarterbacks (QB): 4 Todd Bouman; 5 Trent Edwards; Running backs (RB): 44 Brock Bolen FB; 23 Rashad Jennings; 33 Greg Jones FB; 32 Maurice Jones-Drew; 35 Deji Karim KR; 24 Montell Owens FB; Wide receivers (WR): 83 Jason Hill; 17 John Matthews; 81 Kassim Osgood; 11 Mike Sims-Walker; 80 Mike Thomas PR; 19 Tiquan Underwood; Tight ends (TE): 89 Marcedes Lewis; 86 Zach Miller; 88 Zach Potter	Offensive linemen (OL): 76 Daniel Baldridge T; 78 Jordan Black T; 67 Vince Manuwai G; 63 Brad Meester C; 75 Eugene Monroe T; 77 Uche Nwaneri G; 66 Justin Smiley G; 68 Guy Whimper T; Defensive linemen (DL): 93 Tyson Alualu DT; 98 Nate Collins DT; 69 Leger Douzable DT; 59 Larry Hart DE; 91 Derrick Harvey DE; 96 Terrance Knighton DT; 92 Austen Lane DE; 94 Jeremy Mincey DE; 90 C. J. Mosley DT	Linebackers (LB): 50 Russell Allen OLB; 54 Alvin Bowen MLB; 56 Justin Durant OLB; 97 Aaron Morgan OLB; 55 Kirk Morrison MLB; 53 Slade Norris OLB; 52 Daryl Smith OLB; Defensive backs (DB): 41 Tyron Brackenridge CB; 22 Don Carey FS; 37 Sean Considine S; 21 Derek Cox CB; 36 Courtney Greene SS; 25 Michael Hamlin FS; 31 David Jones CB; 27 Rashean Mathis CB; 29 William Middleton CB; Special teams (ST): 48 Jeremy Cain LS; 3 Adam Podlesh P; 10 Josh Scobee K	Practice squad: 38 Chris Chancellor CB; 13 Clarence Denmark WR; 49 Darius Hill TE; 57 Boris Lee LB; 99 Dre Moore DT; 79 Jonathan Palmer G/T; 60 Bradley Vierling C; Reserve: 51 Kyle Bosworth OLB (IR); 73 Eben Britton T (IR); 58 Jacob Cutrera OLB (IR); 87 Jarett Dillard WR (IR); 62 John Estes C (IR); 9 David Garrard QB (IR); -- Jason Harmon WR (IR); 72 Kevin Haslam T/G (IR); 16 Nate Hughes WR (IR); 74 Aaron Kampman DE (IR); 12 Luke McCown QB (IR); -- Chris McGaha WR (IR); 30 Scotty McGee CB (IR); 95 D'Anthony Smith DT (IR); 53 Bryan Smith OLB (IR); 20 Terrence Wheatley CB (IR); 43 Terrell Whitehead FS (IR); Rookies in italics 53 active, 17 reserve, 7 practice squad

== Preseason ==
Week	Date	Opponent	Result	Record	Venue	Recap
1	August 13	at Philadelphia Eagles	L 27–28	0–1	Lincoln Financial Field	Recap
2	August 21	Miami Dolphins	L 26–27	0–2	EverBank Field	Recap
3	August 28	at Tampa Bay Buccaneers	W 19–13	1–2	Raymond James Stadium	Recap
4	September 2	Atlanta Falcons	W 13–9	2–2	EverBank Field	Recap

== Regular season ==
=== Schedule ===
Week	Date	Opponent	Result	Record	Venue	Recap
1	September 12	Denver Broncos	**W** 24–17	1–0	EverBank Field	Recap
2	September 19	at San Diego Chargers	**L** 13–38	1–1	Qualcomm Stadium	Recap
3	September 26	Philadelphia Eagles	**L** 3–28	1–2	EverBank Field	Recap
4	October 3	**Indianapolis Colts**	**W** 31–28	2–2	EverBank Field	Recap
5	October 10	at Buffalo Bills	**W** 36–26	3–2	Ralph Wilson Stadium	Recap
6	October 18	**Tennessee Titans**	**L** 3–30	3–3	EverBank Field	Recap
7	October 24	at Kansas City Chiefs	**L** 20–42	3–4	Arrowhead Stadium	Recap
8	October 31	at Dallas Cowboys	**W** 35–17	4–4	Cowboys Stadium	Recap
9	Bye					
10	November 14	**Houston Texans**	**W** 31–24	5–4	EverBank Field	Recap
11	November 21	Cleveland Browns	**W** 24–20	6–4	EverBank Field	Recap
12	November 28	at New York Giants	**L** 20–24	6–5	New Meadowlands Stadium	Recap
13	December 5	at **Tennessee Titans**	**W** 17–6	7–5	LP Field	Recap
14	December 12	Oakland Raiders	**W** 38–31	8–5	EverBank Field	Recap
15	December 19	at **Indianapolis Colts**	**L** 24–34	8–6	Lucas Oil Stadium	Recap
16	December 26	Washington Redskins	**L** 17–20 (OT)	8–7	EverBank Field	Recap
17	January 2	at **Houston Texans**	**L** 17–34	8–8	Reliant Stadium	Recap

Note: Intra-division opponents are in bold text.

=== Game summaries ===
==== Week 1: vs. Denver Broncos ====
Week One: Denver Broncos at Jacksonville Jaguars – Game summary

Quarter	1	2	3	4	Total
Broncos	0	7	7	3	**17**
**Jaguars**	0	7	10	7	**24**

at EverBank Field, Jacksonville, Florida

- Date: September 12, 2010
- Game time: 1:00 PM EDT
- Game weather: 90 °F (32 °C)
- Game attendance: 63,636
- Referee: Walt Coleman
- TV announcers (CBS): Kevin Harlan and Solomon Wilcots
- Game Recap, Game Book

Game information

**First quarter**

- No scoring plays.

**Second quarter**

- JAC – Marcedes Lewis 21-yard pass from David Garrard (Josh Scobee kick), 0:50. Jaguars 7–0. **Drive: 6 plays, 60 yards, 3:09.**
- DEN – Jabar Gaffney 10-yard pass from Kyle Orton (Matt Prater kick), 0:16. Tied 7–7. **Drive: 4 plays, 74 yards, 0:34.**

**Third quarter**

- JAC – Marcedes Lewis 10-yard pass from David Garrard (Josh Scobee kick), 10:43. Jaguars 14–7. **Drive: 7 plays, 53 yards, 4:17.**
- DEN – Knowshon Moreno 1-yard run (Matt Prater kick), 4:07. Tied 14–14. **Drive: 4 plays, 40 yards, 1:59.**
- JAC – Josh Scobee 45-yard field goal, 0:45. Jaguars 17–14. **Drive: 7 plays, 26 yards, 3:22.**

**Fourth quarter**

- DEN – Matt Prater 54-yard field goal, 11:20. Tied 17–17. **Drive: 9 plays, 44 yards, 4:25.**
- JAC – Kassim Osgood 24-yard pass from David Garrard (Josh Scobee kick), 7:59. Jaguars 24–17. **Drive: 7 plays, 83 yards, 3:21.**

**Top passers**

- JAC – David Garrard – 16/21, 170 yards, 3 TD
- DEN – Kyle Orton – 21/33, 295 yards, TD, INT

**Top rushers**

- JAC – Maurice Jones-Drew – 23 rushes, 98 yards
- DEN – Knowshon Moreno – 15 rushes, 60 yards, TD

**Top receivers**

- JAC – Mike Thomas – 6 receptions, 89 yards
- DEN – Eddie Royal – 10 receptions, 98 yards

==== Week 2: at San Diego Chargers ====
Week Two: Jacksonville Jaguars at San Diego Chargers – Game summary

Quarter	1	2	3	4	Total
Jaguars	3	3	0	7	**13**
**Chargers**	7	14	3	14	**38**

at Qualcomm Stadium, San Diego, California

- Date: September 19, 2010
- Game time: 4:15 PM EDT
- Game weather: Sunny, 76 °F (24 °C)
- Game attendance: 62,691
- Referee: Terry McAulay
- TV announcers (CBS): Gus Johnson and Steve Tasker
- Recap, Game Book

Game information

**First quarter**

- SD – Mike Tolbert 2-yard run (Nate Kaeding kick), 11:42. Chargers 7–0. **Drive: 6 plays, 74 yards, 3:18.**
- JAC – Josh Scobee 44-yard field goal, 5:29. Chargers 7–3. **Drive: 6 plays, 18 yards, 2:33.**

**Second quarter**

- SD – Antonio Gates 9-yard pass from Philip Rivers (Nate Kaeding kick), 11:32. Chargers 14–3. **Drive: 5 plays, 30 yards, 2:10.**
- JAC – Josh Scobee 48-yard field goal, 1:55. Chargers 14–6. **Drive: 6 plays, 14 yards, 3:42.**
- SD – Antonio Gates 4-yard pass from Philip Rivers (Nate Kaeding kick), 0:10. Chargers 21–6. **Drive: 8 plays, 87 yards, 1:45.**

**Third quarter**

- SD – Nate Kaeding 41-yard field goal, 4:55. Chargers 24–6. **Drive: 9 plays, 44 yards, 4:21.**

**Fourth quarter**

- SD – Mike Tolbert 1-yard run (Nate Kaeding kick), 13:18. Chargers 31–6. **Drive: 5 plays, 58 yards, 2:18.**
- SD – Malcom Floyd 54-yard pass from Philip Rivers (Nate Kaeding kick), 8:06. Chargers 38–6. **Drive: 4 plays, 63 yards, 2:08.**
- JAC – Mike Sims-Walker 24-yard pass from David Garrard (Josh Scobee kick), 0:37. Chargers 38–13. **Drive: 8 plays, 53 yards, 2:34.**

**Top passers**

- JAC – David Garrard – 15/23, 173 yards, TD, 4 INT
- SD – Philip Rivers – 22/29, 334 yards, 3 TD, 2 INT

**Top rushers**

- JAC – Rashad Jennings – 6 rushes, 38 yards
- SD – Mike Tolbert – 16 rushes, 82 yards, 2 TD

**Top receivers**

- JAC – Mike Sims-Walker – 10 receptions, 105 yards, TD
- SD – Antonio Gates – 5 receptions, 57 yards, 2 TD

==== Week 3: vs. Philadelphia Eagles ====
Week Three: Philadelphia Eagles at Jacksonville Jaguars – Game summary

Quarter	1	2	3	4	Total
**Eagles**	7	7	14	0	**28**
Jaguars	0	3	0	0	**3**

at EverBank Field, Jacksonville, Florida

- Date: September 26, 2010
- Game time: 4:05 PM EDT
- Game weather: 89 °F (32 °C)
- Game attendance: 63,256
- Referee: Jeff Triplette
- TV announcers (Fox): Ron Pitts, John Lynch, and Nischelle Turner
- Recap, Game Book

Game information

**First quarter**

- PHI – DeSean Jackson 61-yard pass from Michael Vick (David Akers kick), 5:25. Eagles 7–0. **Drive: 6 plays, 71 yards, 3:01.**

**Second quarter**

- JAC – Josh Scobee 51-yard field goal, 9:08. Eagles 7–3. **Drive: 8 plays, 18 yards, 3:56.**
- PHI – Jeremy Maclin 16-yard pass from Michael Vick (David Akers kick), 0:04. Eagles 14–3. **Drive: 7 plays, 53 yards, 1:33.**

**Third quarter**

- PHI – Jeremy Maclin 45-yard pass from Michael Vick (David Akers kick), 5:21. Eagles 21–3. **Drive: 1 plays, 45 yards, 0:09.**
- PHI – Michael Vick 1-yard run (David Akers kick), 0:17. Eagles 28–3. **Drive: 6 plays, 72 yards, 3:12.**

**Fourth quarter**

- No scoring plays.

**Top passers**

- JAC – David Garrard – 13/30, 105 yards, INT
- PHI – Michael Vick – 17/31, 291 yards, 3 TD

**Top rushers**

- JAC – Maurice Jones-Drew – 22 rushes, 88 yards
- PHI – LeSean McCoy – 11 rushes, 54 yards

**Top receivers**

- JAC – Mike Sims-Walker – 2 receptions, 34 yards
- PHI – DeSean Jackson – 5 receptions, 153 yards, TD

==== Week 4: vs. Indianapolis Colts ====
Week Four: Indianapolis Colts at Jacksonville Jaguars – Game summary

Quarter	1	2	3	4	Total
Colts	7	7	0	14	**28**
**Jaguars**	7	7	7	10	**31**

at EverBank Field, Jacksonville, Florida

- Date: October 3, 2010
- Game time: 4:05 PM EDT
- Game weather: 80 °F (27 °C)
- Game attendance: 63,111
- Referee: Ron Winter
- TV announcers (CBS): Ian Eagle and Dan Fouts
- Recap, Game Book

Game information

**First quarter**

- IND – Joseph Addai 2-yard run (Adam Vinatieri kick), 8:37. Colts 7–0. **Drive: 11 plays, 59 yards, 6:23.**
- JAC – David Garrard 25-yard run (Josh Scobee kick), 3:30. Tied 7–7. **Drive: 9 plays, 76 yards, 5:07.**

**Second quarter**

- JAC – Maurice Jones-Drew 1-yard run (Josh Scobee kick), 13:40. Jaguars 14–7. **Drive: 9 plays, 76 yards, 5:07.**
- IND – Dallas Clark 7-yard pass from Peyton Manning (Adam Vinatieri kick), 7:41. Tied 14–14. **Drive: 11 plays, 85 yards, 5:59.**

**Third quarter**

- JAC – Marcedes Lewis 15-yard pass from David Garrard (Josh Scobee kick), 4:37. Jaguars 21–14. **Drive: 7 plays, 49 yards, 3:49.**

**Fourth quarter**

- IND – Joseph Addai 2-yard run (Adam Vinatieri kick), 7:35. Tied 21–21. **Drive: 11 plays, 96 yards, 4:15.**
- JAC – Maurice Jones-Drew 8-yard pass from David Garrard (Josh Scobee kick), 2:09. Jaguars 28–21. **Drive: 9 plays, 57 yards, 5:26.**
- IND – Austin Collie 1-yard pass from Peyton Manning (Adam Vinatieri kick), 0:48. Tied 28–28. **Drive: 8 plays, 65 yards, 1:21.**
- JAC – Josh Scobee 59-yard field goal, 0:00. Jaguars 31–28. **Drive: 6 plays, 36 yards, 0:48**

**Top passers**

- JAC – David Garrard – 17/22, 163 yards, 2 TD
- IND – Peyton Manning – 33/46, 352 yards, 2 TD, INT

**Top rushers**

- JAC – Maurice Jones-Drew – 26 rushes, 105 yards, TD
- IND – Joseph Addai – 16 rushes, 63 yards, 2 TD

**Top receivers**

- JAC – Mike Thomas – 5 receptions, 68 yards
- IND – Reggie Wayne – 15 receptions, 196 yards

==== Week 5: at Buffalo Bills ====
Week Five: Jacksonville Jaguars at Buffalo Bills – Game summary

Quarter	1	2	3	4	Total
**Jaguars**	3	10	14	9	**36**
Bills	10	3	7	6	**26**

at Ralph Wilson Stadium, Orchard Park, New York

- Date: October 10, 2010
- Game time: 1:00 PM EDT
- Game weather: Sunny, 62 °F (17 °C)
- Game attendance: 58,304
- Referee: Carl Cheffers
- TV announcers: (CBS): Gus Johnson and Steve Tasker
- Recap, Game Book

Game information

**First quarter**

- BUF – Lee Evans 45-yard pass from Ryan Fitzpatrick (Rian Lindell kick), 13:01. Bills 7–0. **Drive: 1 play, 45 yards, 0:08.**
- BUF – Rian Lindell 29-yard field goal, 9:07. Bills 10–0. **Drive: 5 plays, 19 yards, 2:31**
- JAC – Josh Scobee 49-yard field goal, 5:58. Bills 10–3. **Drive: 6 plays, 27 yards, 3:09**

**Second quarter**

- BUF – Rian Lindell 22-yard field goal, 12:08. Bills 13–3. **Drive: 15 plays, 70 yards, 8:50**
- JAC – Josh Scobee 49-yard field goal, 5:52. Bills 13–6. **Drive: 12 plays, 44 yards, 6:16**
- JAC – Marcedes Lewis 1-yard pass from David Garrard (Josh Scobee kick), 0:25. Tied 13–13. **Drive: 10 plays, 85 yards, 4:11.**

**Third quarter**

- JAC – Marcedes Lewis 27-yard pass from David Garrard (Josh Scobee kick), 13:22. Jaguars 20–13. **Drive: 3 plays, 39 yards, 1:38.**
- BUF – Stevie Johnson 5-yard pass from Ryan Fitzpatrick (Rian Lindell kick), 6:56. Tied 20–20. **Drive: 6 plays, 45 yards, 2:01.**
- JAC – Mike Sims-Walker 7-yard pass from David Garrard (Josh Scobee kick), 1:28. Jaguars 27–20. **Drive: 9 plays, 53 yards, 5:28.**

**Fourth quarter**

- JAC – Josh Scobee 34-yard field goal, 11:44. Jaguars 30–20. **Drive: 6 plays, 37 yards, 3:03**
- JAC – Josh Scobee 40-yard field goal, 6:27. Jaguars 33–20. **Drive: 6 plays, 21 yards, 3:40**
- JAC – Josh Scobee 46-yard field goal, 2:40. Jaguars 36–20. **Drive: 5 plays, 24 yards, 1:47**
- BUF – Steve Johnson 7-yard pass from Ryan Fitzpatrick (pass failed), 1:34. Jaguars 36–26. **Drive: 5 plays, 74 yards, 1:06.**

**Top passers**

- JAC – David Garrard – 16/20, 178 yards, 3 TD, INT
- BUF – Ryan Fitzpatrick – 20/30, 220 yards, 3 TD

**Top rushers**

- JAC – Maurice Jones-Drew – 19 rushes, 84 yards
- BUF – Fred Jackson – 12 rushes, 73 yards

**Top receivers**

- JAC – Marcedes Lewis – 4 receptions, 54 yards, 2 TD
- BUF – Lee Evans – 5 receptions, 87 yards, TD

Leading tacklers

- JAC – Derek Cox – 6 tackles
- BUF – Donte Whitner – 10 tackles, 1 assist

==== Week 6: vs. Tennessee Titans ====
Week Six: Tennessee Titans at Jacksonville Jaguars – Game summary

Quarter	1	2	3	4	Total
**Titans**	7	10	3	10	**30**
Jaguars	0	0	3	0	**3**

at EverBank Field, Jacksonville, Florida

- Date: October 18, 2010
- Game time: 8:30 p.m. EDT
- Game weather: 70 °F (21 °C)
- Game attendance: 63,625
- Referee: Mike Carey
- TV announcers (ESPN): Mike Tirico, Ron Jaworski, Jon Gruden, Michele Tafoya, and Suzy Kolber
- Recap, Game Book

Game information

**First quarter**

- TEN – Kenny Britt 23-yard pass from Vince Young (Rob Bironas kick), 12:34. Titans 7–0. **Drive: 6 plays, 79 yards, 2:26.**

**Second quarter**

- TEN – Bo Scaife 2-yard pass from Kerry Collins (Rob Bironas kick), 8:22. Titans 14–0. **Drive: 8 plays, 37 yards, 3:54.**
- TEN – Rob Bironas 26-yard field goal, 2:09. Titans 17–0. **Drive: 10 plays, 36 yards, 4:38.**

**Third quarter**

- TEN – Rob Bironas 33-yard field goal, 11:25. Titans 20–0. **Drive: 5 plays, 18 yards, 2:45.**
- JAC – Josh Scobee 33-yard field goal, 7:05. Titans 20–3. **Drive: 9 plays, 50 yards, 4:20.**

**Fourth quarter**

- TEN – Rob Bironas 36-yard field goal, 14:12. Titans 23–3. **Drive: 12 plays, 55 yards, 7:53.**
- TEN – Chris Johnson 35-yard run (Rob Bironas kick), 1:40. Titans 30–3. **Drive: 9 plays, 80 yards, 4:20.**

**Top passers**

- JAC – Trent Edwards – 14/24, 140 yards, 2 INT
- TEN – Kerry Collins – 11/16, 110 yards, TD

**Top rushers**

- JAC – Maurice Jones-Drew – 17 rushes, 57 yards
- TEN – Chris Johnson – 26 rushes, 111 yards, TD

**Top receivers**

- JAC – Mike Thomas – 8 receptions, 88 yards
- TEN – Bo Scaife – 5 receptions, 53 yards, TD

==== Week 7: at Kansas City Chiefs ====
Week Seven: Jacksonville Jaguars at Kansas City Chiefs – Game summary

Quarter	1	2	3	4	Total
Jaguars	3	10	7	0	**20**
**Chiefs**	7	7	14	14	**42**

at Arrowhead Stadium, Kansas City, Missouri

- Date: October 24, 2010
- Game time: 1:00 p.m. EDT
- Game weather: Partly cloudy, 63 °F (17 °C)
- Game attendance: 69,105
- Referee: Jerome Boger
- TV announcers (CBS): Bill Macatee and Rich Gannon
- Recap, Game Book

Game information

**First quarter**

- KC – Jamaal Charles 4-yard run (Ryan Succop kick), 5:51. Chiefs 7–0. **Drive: 2 plays, 74 yards, 0:35.**
- JAC – Josh Scobee 35-yard field goal, 1:13. Chiefs 7–3. **Drive: 9 plays, 50 yards, 4:38.**

**Second quarter**

- JAC – Maurice Jones-Drew 18-yard pass from Todd Bouman (Josh Scobee kick), 9:38. Jaguars 10–7. **Drive: 8 plays, 71 yards, 4:33.**
- KC – Thomas Jones 1-yard run (Ryan Succop kick), 1:31. Chiefs 14–10. **Drive: 14 plays, 73 yards, 8:07.**
- JAC – Josh Scobee 18-yard field goal, 0:07. Chiefs 14–13. **Drive: 10 plays, 69 yards, 1:24.**

**Third quarter**

- KC – Dwayne Bowe 53-yard pass from Matt Cassel (Ryan Succop kick), 14:23. Chiefs 21–13. **Drive: 2 plays, 60 yards, 0:37.**
- JAC – Mike Sims-Walker 9-yard pass from Todd Bouman (Josh Scobee kick), 10:36. Chiefs 21–20. **Drive: 6 plays, 58 yards, 3:47.**
- KC – Derrick Johnson 15-yard interception return (Ryan Succop kick), 5:13. Chiefs 28–20.

**Fourth quarter**

- KC – Dwayne Bowe 6-yard pass from Matt Cassel (Ryan Succop kick), 3:46. Chiefs 35–20. **Drive: 10 plays, 85 yards, 5:51.**
- KC – Jackie Battle 1-yard run (Ryan Succop kick), 1:56. Chiefs 42–20. **Drive: 3 plays, 12 yards, 1:12.**

**Top passers**

- JAC – Todd Bouman – 18/43, 222 yards, 2 TD, 2 INT
- KC – Matt Cassel – 13/18, 193 yards, 2 TD

**Top rushers**

- JAC – Maurice Jones-Drew – 16 rushes, 47 yards
- KC – Thomas Jones – 20 rushes, 125 yards, TD

**Top receivers**

- JAC – Maurice Jones-Drew – 5 receptions, 74 yards, TD
- KC – Dexter McCluster – 5 receptions, 41 yards

==== Week 8: at Dallas Cowboys ====
Week Eight: Jacksonville Jaguars at Dallas Cowboys – Game summary

Quarter	1	2	3	4	Total
**Jaguars**	7	7	14	7	**35**
Cowboys	3	0	0	14	**17**

at Cowboys Stadium, Arlington, Texas

- Date: October 31, 2010
- Game time: 1:00 p.m. EDT
- Game weather: None (retractable roof closed)
- Game attendance: 81,395
- Referee: Clete Blakeman
- TV announcers (CBS): Jim Nantz and Phil Simms
- Recap, Game Book

Game information

**First quarter**

- DAL – David Buehler 34-yard field goal, 10:46. Cowboys 3–0. **Drive: 9 plays, 54 yards, 4:14.**
- JAC – Mike Sims-Walker 10-yard pass from David Garrard (Josh Scobee kick), 7:50. Jaguars 7–3. **Drive: 5 plays, 63 yards, 2:56.**

**Second quarter**

- JAC – Marcedes Lewis 42-yard pass from David Garrard (Josh Scobee kick), 9:43. Jaguars 14–3. **Drive: 4 plays, 77 yards, 1:53.**

**Third quarter**

- JAC – Mike Thomas 15-yard pass from David Garrard (Josh Scobee kick), 12:14. Jaguars 21–3. **Drive: 6 plays, 83 yards, 2:46.**
- JAC – Marcedes Lewis 9-yard pass from David Garrard (Josh Scobee kick), 9:01. Jaguars 28–3. **Drive: 5 plays, 33 yards, 1:55.**

**Fourth quarter**

- DAL – Marion Barber 1-yard run (David Buehler kick), 12:29. Jaguars 28–10. **Drive: 8 plays, 80 yards, 2:41.**
- JAC – David Garrard 2-yard run (Josh Scobee kick), 5:50. Jaguars 35–10. **Drive: 3 plays, 7 yards, 1:27.**
- DAL – Jason Witten 8-yard pass from Jon Kitna (David Buehler kick), 2:29. Jaguars 35–17. **Drive: 13 plays, 74 yards, 3:21.**

**Top passers**

- JAC – David Garrard – 17/21, 260 yards, 4 TD
- DAL – Jon Kitna – 34/49, 379 yards, TD, 4 INT

**Top rushers**

- JAC – Maurice Jones-Drew – 27 rushes, 135 yards
- DAL – Felix Jones – 8 rushes, 22 yards

**Top receivers**

- JAC – Mike Sims-Walker – 8 receptions, 153 yards, TD
- DAL – Miles Austin – 7 receptions, 117 yards

**Top tacklers**

- JAC – Justin Durant – 9 tackles, 3 assists
- DAL – Keith Brooking – 6 tackles, 4 assists

==== Week 10: vs. Houston Texans ====
Week Ten: Houston Texans at Jacksonville Jaguars – Game summary

Quarter	1	2	3	4	Total
Texans	3	0	14	7	**24**
**Jaguars**	3	14	0	14	**31**

at EverBank Field, Jacksonville, Florida

- Date: November 14, 2010
- Game time: 12:00 p.m. CST
- Game weather: 70 °F (21 °C)
- Game attendance: 62,340
- Referee: Gene Steratore
- TV announcers (CBS): Gus Johnson and Steve Tasker
- Recap, Game Book

Game information

**First quarter**

- JAC – Josh Scobee 38-yard field goal, 8:59. Jaguars 3–0. **Drive: 12 plays, 52 yards, 6:01.**
- HOU – Neil Rackers 24-yard field goal, 4:31. Tied 3–3. **Drive: 10 plays, 69 yards, 4:28.**

**Second quarter**

- JAC – Maurice Jones-Drew 3-yard run (Josh Scobee kick), 5:32. Jaguars 10–3. **Drive: 9 plays, 52 yards, 5:01.**
- JAC – Maurice Jones-Drew 9-yard run (Josh Scobee kick), 0:38. Jaguars 17–3. **Drive: 6 plays, 55 yards, 1:13.**

**Third quarter**

- HOU – Arian Foster 1-yard run (Neil Rackers kick), 11:19. Jaguars 17–10. **Drive: 6 plays, 80 yards, 3:41.**
- HOU – Andre Johnson 9-yard pass from Matt Schaub (Neil Rackers kick), 5:10. Tied 17–17. **Drive: 8 plays, 80 yards, 3:30.**

**Fourth quarter**

- JAC – Zach Miller 52-yard pass from David Garrard (Josh Scobee kick), 6:57. Jaguars 24–17. **Drive: 10 plays, 87 yards, 5:53.**
- HOU – Kevin Walter 18-yard pass from Matt Schaub (Neil Rackers kick), 4:19. Tied 24–24. **Drive: 5 plays, 80 yards, 2:38.**
- JAC – Mike Thomas 50-yard pass from David Garrard (Josh Scobee kick), 0:00. Jaguars 31–24. **Drive: 2 plays, 66 yards, 0:08.**

**Top passers**

- HOU – Matt Schaub – 22/32, 314 yards, 2 TD
- JAC – David Garrard – 24/31, 342 yards, 2 TD

**Top rushers**

- HOU – Arian Foster – 15 rushes, 56 yards, TD
- JAC – Maurice Jones-Drew – 24 rushes, 100 yards, 2 TD

**Top receivers**

- HOU – Andre Johnson – 9 receptions, 146 yards, TD
- JAC – Mike Thomas – 8 receptions, 149 yards, TD

**Top tacklers**

- HOU – Glover Quin – 13 tackles
- JAC – Courtney Greene – 7 tackles

==== Week 11: vs. Cleveland Browns ====
Week Eleven: Cleveland Browns at Jacksonville Jaguars – Game summary

Quarter	1	2	3	4	Total
Browns	0	7	10	3	**20**
**Jaguars**	3	7	0	14	**24**

at EverBank Field, Jacksonville, Florida

- Date: November 21, 2010
- Game time: 1:00 p.m. EST
- Game weather: 76 °F (24 °C) (Sunny)
- Game attendance: 62,254
- Referee: Pete Morelli
- TV announcers (CBS): Bill Macatee and Rich Gannon
- Recap, Game Book

Game information

**First quarter**

- JAC – Josh Scobee 47-yard field goal, 8:08. Jaguars 3–0. **Drive: 7 plays, 33 yards, 3:55.**

**Second quarter**

- CLE – Peyton Hillis 11-yard pass from Colt McCoy (Phil Dawson kick), 13:11. Browns 7–3. **Drive: 16 plays, 92 yards, 9:57.**
- JAC – Mike Thomas 5-yard pass from David Garrard (Josh Scobee kick), 0:30. Jaguars 10–7. **Drive: 13 plays, 68 yards, 4:53.**

**Third quarter**

- CLE – Abram Elam 18-yard fumble return (Phil Dawson kick), 11:14. Browns 14–10.
- CLE – Phil Dawson 38-yard field goal, 1:50. Browns 17–10. **Drive: 4 plays, −1 yard, 1:32.**

**Fourth quarter**

- JAC – Marcedes Lewis 14-yard pass from David Garrard (Josh Scobee kick), 3:34. Tied 17–17. **Drive: 12 plays, 59 yards, 6:13.**
- CLE – Phil Dawson 41-yard field goal, 2:46. Browns 20–17. **Drive: 8 plays, 57 yards, 0:48.**
- JAC – Maurice Jones-Drew 1-yard run (Josh Scobee kick), 1:16. Jaguars 24–20. **Drive: 5 plays, 87 yards, 1:30.**

**Top passers**

- CLE – Colt McCoy – 17/28, 241 yards, TD, INT
- JAC – David Garrard – 20/34, 254 yards, 2 TD, 3 INT

**Top rushers**

- CLE – Peyton Hillis – 21 rushes, 48 yards
- JAC – Maurice Jones-Drew – 23 rushes, 133 yards, TD

**Top receivers**

- CLE – Peyton Hillis – 6 receptions, 95 yards, TD
- JAC – Maurice Jones-Drew – 3 receptions, 87 yards

**Top tacklers**

- CLE – Abram Elam – 6 tackles, INT, forced fumble
- JAC – Daryl Smith – 5 tackles, 2 assists, 1.5 sack

==== Week 12: at New York Giants ====
Week Twelve: Jacksonville Jaguars at New York Giants – Game summary

Quarter	1	2	3	4	Total
Jaguars	7	10	0	3	**20**
**Giants**	3	3	3	15	**24**

at New Meadowlands Stadium, East Rutherford, New Jersey

- Date: November 28, 2010
- Game time: 1:00 p.m. EST
- Game weather: Sunny, 43 °F (6 °C)
- Game attendance: 78,533
- Referee: Terry McAulay
- TV announcers (CBS): Greg Gumbel and Dan Dierdorf
- Recap, Game Book

Game information

**First quarter**

- NYG – Lawrence Tynes 22-yard field goal, 9:06. Giants 3–0. **Drive: 11 plays, 75 yards, 5:54.**
- JAC – Rashad Jennings 5-yard run (Josh Scobee kick), 4:44. Jaguars 7–3. **Drive: 9 plays, 75 yards, 4:22.**

**Second quarter**

- JAC – Josh Scobee 22-yard field goal, 9:11. Jaguars 10–3. **Drive: 15 plays, 85 yards, 8:57.**
- NYG – Lawrence Tynes 29-yard field goal, 5:34. Jaguars 10–6. **Drive: 7 plays, 64 yards, 3:37.**
- JAC – David Garrard 5-yard run (Josh Scobee kick), 0:19. Jaguars 17–6'. **Drive: 13 plays, 71 yards, 5:15.**

**Third quarter**

- NYG – Lawrence Tynes 28-yard field goal, 10:19. Jaguars 17–9. **Drive: 10 plays, 24 yards, 4:27.**

**Fourth quarter**

- NYG – Mario Manningham 26-yard pass from Eli Manning (Ahmad Bradshaw run), 13:42. Tied 17–17. **Drive: 5 plays, 88 yards, 1:57.**
- JAC – Josh Scobee 42-yard field goal, 8:26. Jaguars 20–17. **Drive: 10 plays, 42 yards, 5:16.**
- NYG – Kevin Boss 32-yard pass from Eli Manning (Lawrence Tynes kick), 3:15. Giants 24–20. **Drive: 6 plays, 69 yards, 2:40.**

**Top passers**

- JAC – David Garrard – 20/35, 162 yards, INT
- NYG – Eli Manning – 14/24, 226 yards, 2 TD

**Top rushers**

- JAC – Maurice Jones-Drew – 21 rushes, 113 yards
- NYG – Brandon Jacobs – 14 rushes, 87 yards

**Top receivers**

- JAC – Mike Sims-Walker – 4 receptions, 48 yards
- NYG – Kevin Boss – 3 receptions, 74 yards, TD

**Top tacklers**

- JAC – Courtney Greene – 7 tackles, 4 assists
- NYG – Deon Grant – 8 tackles

==== Week 13: at Tennessee Titans ====
Week Thirteen: Jacksonville Jaguars at Tennessee Titans – Game summary

Quarter	1	2	3	4	Total
**Jaguars**	7	10	0	0	**17**
Titans	0	0	3	3	**6**

at LP Field, Nashville, Tennessee

- Date: December 5, 2010
- Game time: 1:00 p.m. EST
- Game weather: Cloudy, 35 °F (2 °C)
- Game attendance: 69,143
- Referee: Ron Winter
- TV announcers (CBS): Gus Johnson and Steve Tasker
- Recap, Game Book

Game information

**First quarter**

- JAC – Rashad Jennings 11-yard run (Josh Scobee kick), 5:51. Jaguars 7–0. **Drive: 12 plays, 77 yards, 6:35.**

**Second quarter**

- JAC – David Garrard 4-yard run (Josh Scobee kick), 5:38. Jaguars 14–0'. **Drive: 13 plays, 57 yards, 7:33.**
- JAC – Josh Scobee 26-yard field goal, 0:00. Jaguars 17–0. **Drive: 9 plays, 49 yards, 2:41.**

**Third quarter**

- TEN – Rob Bironas 37-yard field goal, 5:58. Jaguars 17–3. **Drive: 10 plays, 62 yards, 3:31.**

**Fourth quarter**

- TEN – Rob Bironas 30-yard field goal, 12:05. Jaguars 17–6. **Drive: 13 plays, 49 yards, 6:09.**

**Top passers**

- JAC – David Garrard – 14/19, 126 yards
- TEN – Kerry Collins – 14/32, 169 yards, 2 INT

**Top rushers**

- JAC – Maurice Jones-Drew – 31 rushes, 186 yards
- TEN – Chris Johnson – 13 rushes, 53 yards

**Top receivers**

- JAC – Marcedes Lewis – 3 receptions, 36 yards
- TEN – Jared Cook – 4 receptions, 47 yards

**Top tacklers**

- JAC – Rashean Mathis – 5 tackles, 1 assist
- TEN – Stephen Tulloch – 14 tackles, 3 assists

==== Week 14: vs. Oakland Raiders ====
Week Fourteen: Oakland Raiders at Jacksonville Jaguars – Game summary

Quarter	1	2	3	4	Total
Raiders	7	10	7	7	**31**
**Jaguars**	0	7	21	10	**38**

at EverBank Field, Jacksonville, Florida

- Date: December 12, 2010
- Game time: 1:00 p.m. EST
- Game weather: 54 °F (12 °C) (Sunny)
- Game attendance: 62,570
- Referee: Alberto Riveron
- TV announcers (CBS): Kevin Harlan and Solomon Wilcots
- Recap, Game Book

Game information

**First quarter**

- OAK – Darren McFadden 67-yard pass from Jason Campbell (Sebastian Janikowski kick), 10:28. Raiders 7–0. **Drive: 3 plays, 69 yards, 1:33.**

**Second quarter**

- JAC – Marcedes Lewis 1-yard pass from David Garrard (Josh Scobee kick), 11:56. Tied 7–7. **Drive: 7 plays, 45 yards, 3:36.**
- OAK – Sebastian Janikowski 26-yard field goal, 6:25. Raiders 10–7. **Drive: 10 plays, 74 yards, 5:31.**
- OAK – Louis Murphy 8-yard pass from Jason Campbell (Sebastian Janikowski kick), 0:19. Raiders 17–7. **Drive: 9 plays, 79 yards, 3:51.**

**Third quarter**

- JAC – Jason Hill 48-yard pass from David Garrard (Josh Scobee kick), 12:47. Raiders 17–14. **Drive: 4 plays, 57 yards, 2:13.**
- OAK – Darren McFadden 51-yard run (Sebastian Janikowski kick), 11:21. Raiders 24–14. **Drive: 3 plays, 78 yards, 1:26.**
- JAC – Rashad Jennings 74-yard run (Josh Scobee kick), 6:44. Raiders 24–21. **Drive: 3 plays, 82 yards, 1:33.**
- JAC – Mike Sims-Walker 10-yard pass from David Garrard (Josh Scobee kick), 3:44. Jaguars 28–24. **Drive: 5 plays, 22 yards, 2:44.**

**Fourth quarter**

- JAC – Josh Scobee 19-yard field goal, 11:22. Jaguars 31–24. **Drive: 10 plays, 61 yards, 6:19.**
- OAK – Darren McFadden 36-yard run (Sebastian Janikowski kick), 1:53. Tied 31–31. **Drive: 7 plays, 83 yards, 3:40.**
- JAC – Maurice Jones-Drew 30-yard run (Josh Scobee kick), 1:34. Jaguars 38–31. **Drive: 1 play, 30 yards, 0:19.**

**Top passers**

- OAK – Jason Campbell – 21/30, 324 yards, 2 TD
- JAC – David Garrard – 11/22, 159 yards, 3 TD, INT

**Top rushers**

- OAK – Darren McFadden – 16 rushes, 123 yards, 2 TD
- JAC – Rashad Jennings – 5 rushes, 109 yards, TD

**Top receivers**

- OAK – Darren McFadden – 3 receptions, 86 yards, TD
- JAC – Marcedes Lewis – 4 receptions, 57 yards, TD

**Top tacklers**

- OAK – Tyvon Branch – 6 tackles
- JAC – Kirk Morrison – 7 tackles

==== Week 15: at Indianapolis Colts ====
Week Fifteen: Jacksonville Jaguars at Indianapolis Colts – Game summary

Quarter	1	2	3	4	Total
Jaguars	0	10	7	7	**24**
**Colts**	7	7	10	10	**34**

at Lucas Oil Stadium, Indianapolis, Indiana

- Date: December 19, 2010
- Game time: 1:00 p.m. EST
- Game weather: None (retractable roof closed)
- Game attendance: 67,147
- Referee: Mike Carey
- TV announcers (CBS): Greg Gumbel and Dan Dierdorf
- Recap, Game Book

Game information

**First quarter**

- IND – Austin Collie 7-yard pass from Peyton Manning (Adam Vinatieri kick), 11:21. Colts 7–0. **Drive: 8 plays, 82 yards, 3:39.**

**Second quarter**

- JAC – Josh Scobee 22-yard field goal, 14:13. Colts 7–3. **Drive: 15 plays, 77 yards, 8:41.**
- IND – Austin Collie 27-yard pass from Peyton Manning (Adam Vinatieri kick), 9:51. Colts 14–3. **Drive: 11 plays, 92 yards, 4:22.**
- JAC – Mike Thomas 78-yard punt return (Josh Scobee kick), 3:51. Colts 14–10.

**Third quarter**

- IND – Donald Brown 43-yard run (Adam Vinatieri kick), 12:19. Colts 21–10. **Drive: 2 plays, 38 yards, 1:03.**
- IND – Adam Vinatieri 34-yard field goal, 8:47. Colts 24–10. **Drive: 4 plays, 5 yards, 1:21.**
- JAC – Mike Sims-Walker 6-yard pass from David Garrard (Josh Scobee kick), 3:54. Colts 24–17. **Drive: 7 plays, 77 yards, 4:53.**

**Fourth quarter**

- IND – Adam Vinatieri 37-yard field goal, 9:57. Colts 27–17'. **Drive: 9 plays, 37 yards, 5:03.**
- JAC – Mike Sims-Walker 1-yard pass from David Garrard (Josh Scobee kick), 1:54. Colts 27–24. **Drive: 7 plays, 51 yards, 1:27.**
- IND – Tyjuan Hagler 41-yard kickoff return (Adam Vinatieri kick), 1:47. Colts 34–24.

**Top passers**

- JAC – David Garrard – 24/38, 294 yards, 2 TD, INT
- IND – Peyton Manning – 29/39, 229 yards, 2 TD

**Top rushers**

- JAC – Maurice Jones-Drew – 15 rushes, 46 yards
- IND – Donald Brown – 14 rushes, 129 yards, TD

**Top receivers**

- JAC – Rashad Jennings – 7 receptions, 64 yards
- IND – Austin Collie – 8 receptions, 87 yards, 2 TD

**Top tacklers**

- JAC – Daryl Smith – 13 tackles, 2 assists, 1 sack
- IND – Pat Angerer – 6 tackles, 2 assists

==== Week 16: vs. Washington Redskins ====
Week Sixteen: Washington Redskins at Jacksonville Jaguars – Game summary

Quarter	1	2	3	4	OT	Total
**Redskins**	10	0	0	7	3	**20**
Jaguars	0	7	3	7	0	**17**

at EverBank Field, Jacksonville, Florida

- Date: December 26, 2010
- Game time: 1:00 p.m. EST
- Game weather: 38 °F (3 °C)
- Game attendance: 63,470
- Referee: Jerome Boger
- TV announcers (Fox): Sam Rosen and Tim Ryan
- Recap, Game Book

Game information

**First quarter**

- WAS – Graham Gano 48-yard field goal, 13:41. Redskins 3–0. **Drive: 5 plays, 14 yards, 1:19.**
- WAS – Fred Davis 1-yard pass from Rex Grossman (Graham Gano kick), 9:07. Redskins 10–0. **Drive: 5 plays, 18 yards, 2:24.**

**Second quarter**

- JAC – Mike Thomas 19-yard pass from David Garrard (Josh Scobee kick), 8:18. Redskins 10–7. **Drive: 10 plays, 79 yards, 5:55.**

**Third quarter**

- JAC – Josh Scobee 34-yard field goal, 4:57. Tied 10–10. **Drive: 8 plays, 62 yards, 3:53.**

**Fourth quarter**

- WAS – Ryan Torain 1-yard run (Graham Gano kick), 12:07. Redskins 17–10. **Drive: 14 plays, 68 yards, 7:50.**
- JAC – David Garrard 20-yard run (Josh Scobee kick), 2:44. Tied 17–17. **Drive: 4 plays, 42 yards, 1:16.**

**Overtime**

- WAS – Graham Gano 31-yard field goal, 12:13. Redskins 20–17. **Drive: 3 plays, 1 yards, 1:12.**

**Top passers**

- WAS – Rex Grossman – 19/39, 182 yards, TD, INT
- JAC – David Garrard – 22/38, 299 yards, TD, 2 INT

**Top rushers**

- WAS – Ryan Torain – 20 rushes, 65 yards, TD
- JAC – David Garrard – 6 rushes, 39 yards, TD

**Top receivers**

- WAS – Santana Moss – 5 receptions, 85 yards
- JAC – Mike Thomas – 6 receptions, 96 yards, TD

**Top tacklers**

- WAS – Rocky McIntosh – 7 tackles
- JAC – Daryl Smith – 9 tackles

==== Week 17: at Houston Texans ====
Week Seventeen: Jacksonville Jaguars at Houston Texans – Game summary

Quarter	1	2	3	4	Total
Jaguars	0	17	0	0	**17**
**Texans**	10	10	7	7	**34**

at Reliant Stadium, Houston, Texas

- Date: January 2, 2011
- Game time: 4:15 p.m. EST
- Game weather: Sunny, 60 °F (16 °C)
- Game attendance: 71,023
- Referee: Jeff Triplette
- TV announcers (CBS): Greg Gumbel and Dan Dierdorf
- Recap, Game Book

Game information

**First quarter**

- HOU – Arian Foster 2-yard run (Neil Rackers kick), 12:25. Texans 7–0. **Drive: 6 plays, 90 yards, 2:35.**
- HOU – Neil Rackers 26-yard field goal, 4:15. Texans 10–0. **Drive: 10 plays, 64 yards, 5:27.**

**Second quarter**

- JAC – Rashad Jennings 2-yard run (Josh Scobee kick), 14:54. Texans 10–7. **Drive: 8 plays, 67 yards, 4:21.**
- HOU – Derrick Ward 35-yard run (Neil Rackers kick), 12:35. Texans 17–7. **Drive: 5 plays, 75 yards, 2:01.**
- JAC – Josh Scobee 39-yard field goal, 8:40. Texans 17–10. **Drive: 11 plays, 49 yards, 4:13.**
- JAC – Marcedes Lewis 7-yard pass from Trent Edwards (Josh Scobee kick), 1:54. Tied 17–17. **Drive: 7 plays, 74 yards, 4:36.**
- HOU – Neil Rackers 33-yard field goal, 0:00. Texans 20–17. **Drive: 9 plays, 57 yards, 1:54.**

**Third quarter**

- HOU – Owen Daniels 5-yard pass from Matt Schaub (Neil Rackers kick), 3:47. Texans 27–17. **Drive: 10 plays, 97 yards, 5:29.**

**Fourth quarter**

- HOU – Arian Foster 35-yard run (Neil Rackers kick), 10:49. Texans 34–17. **Drive: 2 plays, 76 yards, 0:49.**

**Top passers**

- JAC – Trent Edwards – 12/25, 140 yards, TD, INT
- HOU – Matt Schaub – 18/22, 253 yards, TD

**Top rushers**

- JAC – Rashad Jennings – 22 rushes, 108 yards, TD
- HOU – Arian Foster – 31 rushes, 180 yards, 2 TD

**Top receivers**

- JAC – Jason Hill – 3 receptions, 68 yards
- HOU – Austin Collie – 8 receptions, 87 yards, 2 TD

=== Standings ===
==== Division ====
AFC South
	W	L	T	PCT	DIV	CONF	PF	PA	STK
^{(3)} Indianapolis Colts	10	6	0	.625	4–2	8–4	435	388	W4
Jacksonville Jaguars	8	8	0	.500	3–3	7–5	353	419	L3
Houston Texans	6	10	0	.375	3–3	4–8	390	427	W1
Tennessee Titans	6	10	0	.375	2–4	3–9	356	339	L2

==== Conference ====
AFC
#	Team	Division	W	L	T	PCT	DIV	CONF	SOS	SOV	STK
**Division winners**
1	New England Patriots	East	14	2	0	.875	5–1	10–2	.504	.504	W8
2 (Note: Pittsburgh clinched the AFC North title instead of Baltimore based on division record (5–1 to Baltimore's 4–2).)	Pittsburgh Steelers	North	12	4	0	.750	5–1	9–3	.500	.417	W2
3 (Note: Indianapolis clinched the AFC No. 3 seed instead of Kansas City based on a head-to-head victory.)	Indianapolis Colts	South	10	6	0	.625	4–2	8–4	.473	.425	W4
4	Kansas City Chiefs	West	10	6	0	.625	2–4	6–6	.414	.381	L1
**Wild cards**
5	Baltimore Ravens	North	12	4	0	.750	4–2	9–3	.484	.422	W4
6	New York Jets	East	11	5	0	.688	4–2	9–3	.492	.409	W1
**Did not qualify for the postseason**
7	San Diego Chargers	West	9	7	0	.563	3–3	7–5	.457	.410	W1
8 (Note: Jacksonville finished ahead of Oakland based on head-to-head victory.)	Jacksonville Jaguars	South	8	8	0	.500	3–3	7–5	.453	.383	L3
9	Oakland Raiders	West	8	8	0	.500	6–0	6–6	.469	.469	W1
10	Miami Dolphins	East	7	9	0	.438	2–4	5–7	.539	.438	L3
11 (Note: Houston finished ahead of Tennessee in the AFC South based on division record (3–3 to Tennessee's 2–4).)	Houston Texans	South	6	10	0	.375	3–3	5–7	.523	.500	W1
12	Tennessee Titans	South	6	10	0	.375	2–4	3–9	.508	.500	L2
13	Cleveland Browns	North	5	11	0	.313	1–5	3–9	.570	.475	L4
14 (Note: Denver finished ahead of Buffalo and Cincinnati based on strength of victory.)	Denver Broncos	West	4	12	0	.250	1–5	3–9	.516	.453	L1
15 (Note: Buffalo finished ahead of Cincinnati based on head-to-head victory.)	Buffalo Bills	East	4	12	0	.250	1–5	3–9	.578	.344	L2
16	Cincinnati Bengals	North	4	12	0	.250	2–4	3–9	.582	.438	L1
**Tiebreakers** (Note: When breaking ties for three or more teams under the NFL's rules, they are first broken within divisions, then comparing only the highest ranked remaining team from each division.)
