= Don Carey =

Don Carey may refer to:

- Don Carey (cornerback) (born 1987), American football cornerback
- Don Carey (official) (born 1947), official in the National Football League
