= List of James Madison Dukes in the NFL draft =

This is a list of James Madison Dukes football players in the NFL draft.

== Key ==
B	Back	K	Kicker	NT	Nose tackle
C	Center	LB	Linebacker	FB	Fullback
DB	Defensive back	P	Punter	HB	Halfback
DE	Defensive end	QB	Quarterback	WR	Wide receiver
DT	Defensive tackle	RB	Running back	G	Guard
E	End	T	Offensive tackle	TE	Tight end

*	Selected to a Pro Bowl
†	Won a Super Bowl championship
‡	Selected to a Pro Bowl and won a Super Bowl championship

== Selections ==
Year	Round	Pick	Overall	Player	Team	Position	Notes
1984	2	27	55	Gary Clark^{‡}	Washington Redskins	WR	Pro Bowl (1986, 1987, 1990, 1991); Super Bowl champion (XXII, XXVI)
1986	4	14	96	Charles Haley^{‡}	San Francisco 49ers	DE	Pro Bowl (1988, 1990, 1991, 1994, 1995); Super Bowl champion (XXIII, XXIV, XXVII, XXVIII, XXX)
1987	6	27	167	Warren Marshall	Denver Broncos	RB	—
1988	9	7	228	Neal Wilkinson	Green Bay Packers	TE	—
1989	12	24	331	Shawn Woodson	Minnesota Vikings	LB	—
1990	10	24	272	Steve Bates	Los Angeles Rams	DE	—
1996	6	38	205	Mike Cawley	Indianapolis Colts	QB	—
1997	4	31	127	Macey Brooks	Dallas Cowboys	WR	—
1997	6	14	177	Ed Perry	Miami Dolphins	TE	—
1999	7	5	211	Tony Booth	Carolina Panthers	DB	—
2000	4	3	97	Curtis Keaton	Cincinnati Bengals	RB	—
2010	6	9	178	Arthur Moats	Buffalo Bills	LB	—
2010	6	34	203	Scotty McGee	Jacksonville Jaguars	DB	—
2013	4	19	116	Earl Watford	Arizona Cardinals	G	—
2019	7	13	227	Jimmy Moreland	Washington Redskins	DB	—
2020	7	17	231	Ben DiNucci	Dallas Cowboys	QB	—

== Notable undrafted players ==
Note: No drafts held before 1920

Debut year	Player name	Position	Debut NFL/AFL team	Notes
1982	Scott Norwood*	K	Atlanta Falcons	Pro Bowl (1988)
1994	Dion Foxx	LB	Miami Dolphins	—
2002	Delvin Joyce	RB	New York Giants	—
2007	Akeem Jordan	LB	Philadelphia Eagles	—
2010	Mike Caussin	TE	Jacksonville Jaguars	—
2015	Dean Marlowe	DB	Carolina Panthers	—
2018	Raven Greene	DB	Green Bay Packers	—
2026	Nick DeGennaro	WR	New England Patriots	—
2026	Jacob Thomas	S	Minnesota Vikings	—
