= Marcedes Lewis =

American football player (born 1984)

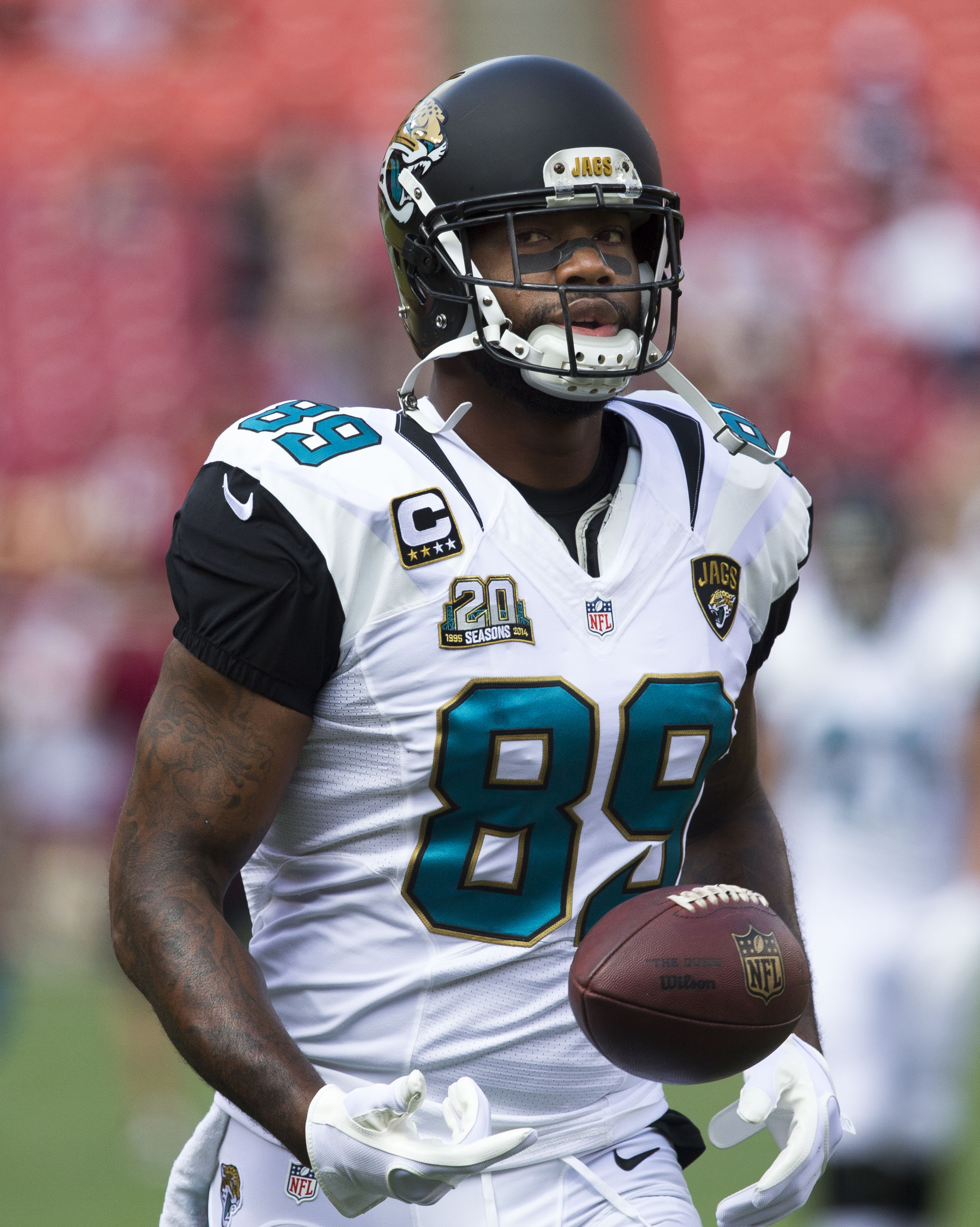
- Lewis with the Jacksonville Jaguars in 2014

Profile
- Position: Tight end

Personal information
- Born: May 19, 1984 (age 42); Los Alamitos, California, U.S.
- Listed height: 6 ft 6 in (1.98 m)
- Listed weight: 265 lb (120 kg)

Career information
- High school: Long Beach Polytechnic (Long Beach, California)
- College: UCLA (2002–2005)
- NFL draft: 2006: 1st round, 28th overall pick

Career history
- Jacksonville Jaguars (2006–2017); Green Bay Packers (2018–2022); Chicago Bears (2023–2024); Denver Broncos (2025)

Awards and highlights
- Pro Bowl (2010); John Mackey Award (2005); Consensus All-American (2005); First-team All-Pac-10 (2005); Second-team All-Pac-10 (2004); NFL records: Most career NFL games by a tight end: 290; Oldest NFL player to play at tight end

Career NFL statistics
- Receptions: 437
- Receiving yards: 5,115
- Receiving touchdowns: 40
- Stats at Pro Football Reference

Marcedes Alexis Lewis (born May 19, 1984), nicknamed "Big Dog", is an American professional football tight end. He played college football for the UCLA Bruins, earning consensus All-American honors. Lewis was selected by the Jacksonville Jaguars in the first round of the 2006 NFL draft. He has also played for the Green Bay Packers, Chicago Bears, and Denver Broncos.

== Early life ==
Lewis was born on May 19, 1984, in Los Alamitos, California. He graduated from Long Beach Polytechnic High School in Long Beach, California, where he played high school football for the Jackrabbits. In 2001, Lewis competed in a nationally televised game against De La Salle of Concord, California. As a senior, he was named as a Parade magazine high school All-American and was considered a top prospect by all major recruiting services.

== College career ==
Lewis attended the University of California, Los Angeles (UCLA), and played college football for the Bruins from 2002 to 2005. In 49 games with the Bruins, he started 32. Lewis ranks ninth on the school's overall career-record receiving list and first among tight ends with 126 receptions, holding the UCLA tight end all-time records with 1,571 yards receiving and 21 touchdowns. As a senior in 2005, he was a first-team All-Pacific-10 selection, a consensus All-American, and won the John Mackey Award, given annually to the top tight end in college football.

Lewis was inducted into the UCLA Athletics Hall of Fame as a member of the 2022 class.

== Professional career ==
Pre-draft measurables
Height	Weight	Arm length	Hand span	40-yard dash	10-yard split	20-yard split	20-yard shuttle	Three-cone drill	Vertical jump	Broad jump	Bench press
6 ft 6 3/8 in (1.99 m)	261 lb (118 kg)	34 3/8 in (0.87 m)	10 in (0.25 m)	4.85 s	1.67 s	2.82 s	4.82 s	7.24 s	37 in (0.94 m)	9 ft 10 in (3.00 m)	23 reps
All values are from NFL Combine

=== Jacksonville Jaguars ===
Lewis was selected by the Jacksonville Jaguars in the first round (28th overall) of the 2006 NFL draft. He played college football at UCLA with running back Maurice Jones-Drew, who was also selected on the first day by the Jaguars. In July 2006, Lewis signed a five-year, $7.5 million contract with $4.9 million guaranteed.

Lewis made his NFL debut in Week 2 of the 2006 season against the Pittsburgh Steelers in a 9–0 victory. He scored his first professional touchdown on a one-yard reception from David Garrard in Week 12 against the Buffalo Bills. Lewis finished his rookie season with 13 receptions for 126 yards and a touchdown in 15 games and three starts. Lewis' role expanded in the 2007 season with 37 receptions for 391 yards and two touchdowns. He started all 16 games in his second year.

In 2008, Lewis started all 16 games once again and recorded 41 receptions for 489 yards and two touchdowns, which came in consecutive games in Week 5 and Week 6.

In the 2009 season, Lewis started all 16 games and recorded 32 receptions for 518 yards and two touchdowns.

In the 2010 season, Lewis matched the Jaguars single-season touchdown receptions record with a total of 10 and was selected to his first Pro Bowl. He had previously been named as an alternate for the 2009 Pro Bowl. He started all 16 games and had three games with multiple receiving touchdowns.

Due in part to the 2011 NFL lockout, the Jaguars placed the franchise tag on Lewis on February 24, 2011. On August 5, 2011, after a short training camp hold out, Lewis signed a five-year contract reportedly worth about $35 million ($17 million guaranteed). In the 2011 season, he started in and appeared in 15 games and totaled 39 receptions for 460 receiving yards. For the first time in his professional career, he did not have a touchdown. In the final game of the 2012 regular season against the Tennessee Titans, Lewis had seven receptions for 103 receiving yards for his first game going over the 100-yard mark. He totaled 52 receptions for 540 receiving yards and four receiving touchdowns on the season. In the 2013 season, he totaled 25 receptions for 359 receiving yards and four receiving touchdowns in 11 games. The four receiving touchdowns all came in four consecutive games from Week 13 to Week 16. In the 2014 season, he totaled 18 receptions for 206 receiving yards and two receiving touchdowns. Lewis continued his constant production in the 2015 season with 16 receptions for 226 receiving yards in 16 games, all starts.

On March 9, 2016, Lewis re-signed a three-year, $12 million contract to remain with the Jaguars. He was placed on injured reserve on November 21, 2016, after suffering a calf injury in Week 11 against the Detroit Lions. He totaled 20 receptions for 169 receiving yards and one receiving touchdown in ten starting appearances. In Week 3 of the 2017 season, he recorded four receptions for 62 receiving yards and a career-high three receiving touchdowns in a 44–7 victory over the Baltimore Ravens. He finished with 24 receptions for 318 receiving yards and five receiving touchdowns in 16 starts. In the AFC Championship loss to the New England Patriots, Lewis recorded his first postseason touchdown on a four-yard reception from Blake Bortles.

On March 20, 2018, Lewis was released by the Jaguars after 12 seasons with the team.

=== Green Bay Packers ===
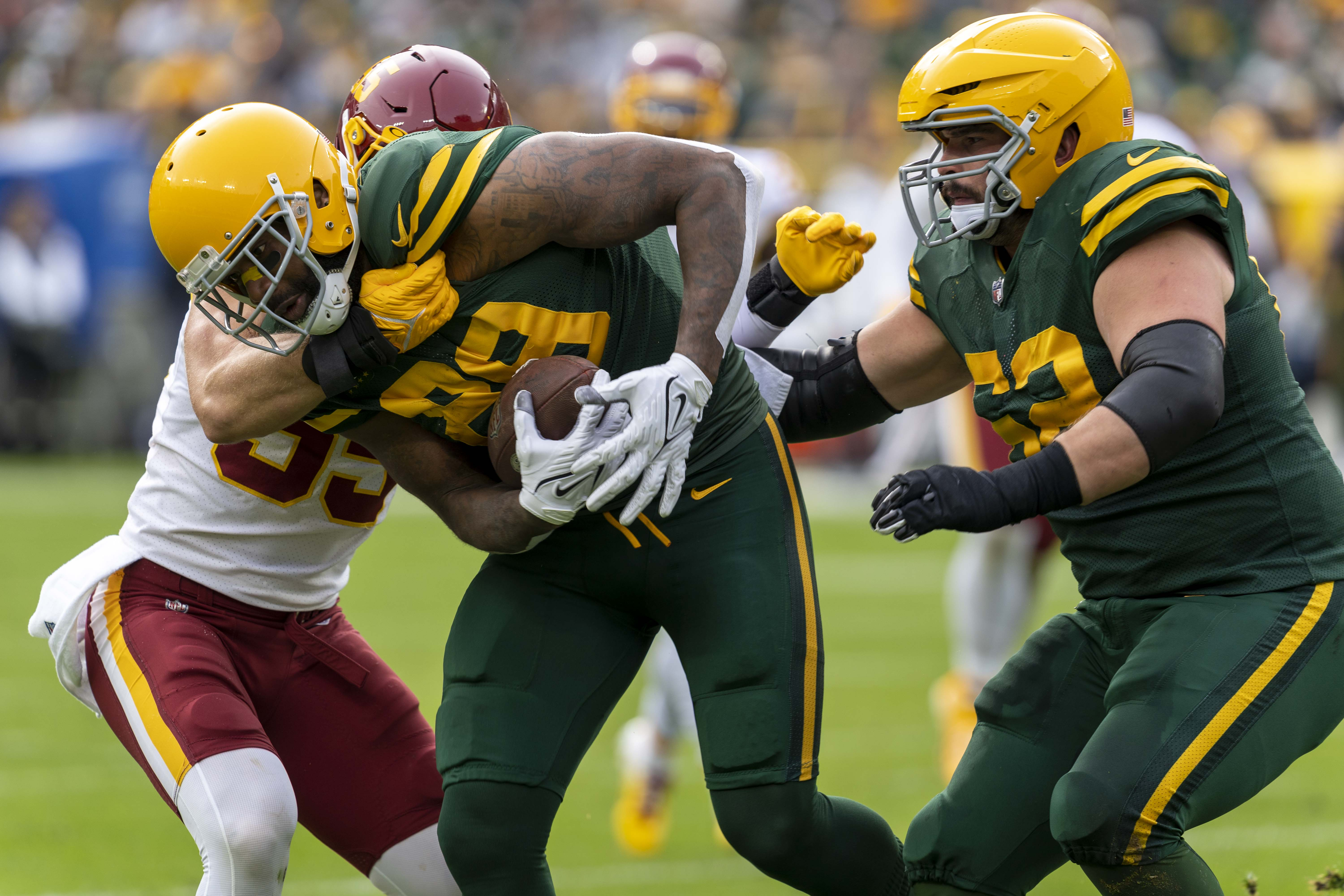
Lewis in 2021

On May 24, 2018, the Green Bay Packers signed Lewis to a one-year, $2.1 million contract that included a $500,000 signing bonus. Lewis caught his first pass as a Packer on November 4, 2018, during a Week 9 loss to the Patriots. He finished the 2018 season with three catches for 39 yards.

On March 18, 2019, Lewis re-signed with the Packers on a one-year, $2.1 million contract. Lewis caught his first touchdown as a Packer, a one-yard reception from Aaron Rodgers, on December 1, 2019, during a Week 13 victory over the New York Giants. He finished the 2019 season with 15 receptions for 156 yards and a touchdown. The Packers advanced to the playoffs as the #2-seed in the NFC, losing in the NFC Championship Game to the San Francisco 49ers.

On March 24, 2020, Lewis re-signed with the Packers on a one-year contract. Lewis started 15 games, catching 10 passes for 107 yards and three touchdowns. The Packers advanced to the playoffs as the #1-seed in the NFC, but again lost in the NFC Championship Game to the eventual Super Bowl champion Tampa Bay Buccaneers.

On March 30, 2021, Packers re-signed Lewis to a two-year, $8 million contract. During a narrow Week 15 31–30 victory against the Ravens, Lewis surpassed 5,000 career receiving yards. He started all 17 games in the 2021 season and finished with 23 receptions for 214 yards. The Packers again clinched home-field advantage as the NFC's top seed for the 2021 playoffs. However, they lost to the 49ers in the Divisional Round 13–10.

In the 2022 season, Lewis started all 17 games for the Packers. He had six receptions for 66 yards and two touchdowns.

=== Chicago Bears ===
On August 4, 2023, Lewis signed a one-year deal with the Chicago Bears. He played in all 17 games with four starts primarily as a blocker, but did have a one-yard touchdown catch in a 27–16 victory over the Cardinals.

Lewis initially entered free agency but re-signed with the Bears on a one-year contract on June 10, 2024. When he appeared in the Week 4 game against the Los Angeles Rams, Lewis broke a tie with Jason Witten for the most career games played by a tight end with 272.

In the 2024 season, Lewis appeared in 17 games and started five.

=== Denver Broncos ===
On October 29, 2025, Lewis signed with the Denver Broncos' practice squad. He was elevated to the active roster for Week 9 against the Houston Texans, making Lewis the oldest tight end to ever play in an NFL game at 41 years old, as well as the oldest player in Broncos history. On December 6, Lewis was promoted to the active roster. Five days later, he was waived by the Broncos and re-signed to the practice squad. On December 25, Lewis was promoted to the active roster again. On January 5, 2026, he was waived again and then re-signed to the practice squad.

== Personal life ==
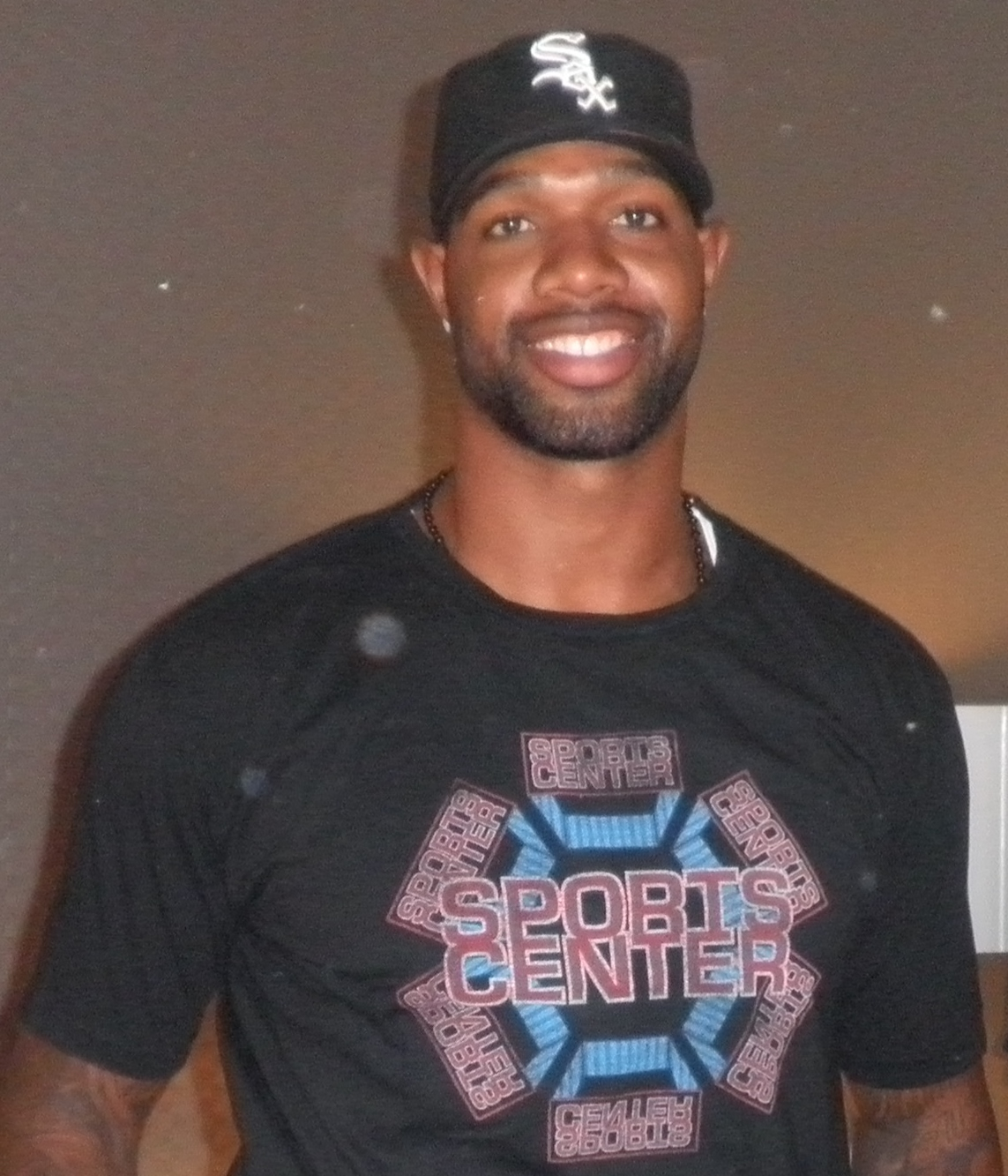
Lewis in 2011

Lewis has been active in his hometown of Long Beach, California, holding football camps that combine sports development with academics.

Lewis is an avid fan and practitioner of MMA and has even trained with UFC Hall of Famer Chuck Liddell in the past. Lewis frequently attends UFC events, most recently at UFC 303 in Las Vegas, Nevada, alongside former teammate Aaron Rodgers.

== Career statistics ==
=== NFL ===
Regular season

Year	Team	Games		Receiving					Fumbles	
Year	Team	GP	GS	Rec	Yds	Avg	Lng	TD	Fum	Lost
2006	JAX	15	3	13	126	9.7	31	1	0	0
2007	JAX	16	16	37	391	10.6	25	2	0	0
2008	JAX	16	16	41	489	11.9	30	2	0	0
2009	JAX	15	15	32	518	16.2	47	2	1	0
2010	JAX	16	16	58	700	12.1	42	10	2	2
2011	JAX	15	15	39	460	11.8	62	0	0	0
2012	JAX	16	15	52	540	10.4	26	4	0	0
2013	JAX	11	11	25	359	14.4	41	4	1	1
2014	JAX	8	8	18	206	11.4	63	2	0	0
2015	JAX	16	16	16	226	14.1	45	0	0	0
2016	JAX	10	10	20	169	8.4	37	1	0	0
2017	JAX	16	16	24	318	13.3	37	5	0	0
2018	GB	16	4	3	39	13.0	30	0	0	0
2019	GB	16	11	15	156	10.4	25	1	0	0
2020	GB	15	15	10	107	10.7	36	3	0	0
2021	GB	17	17	23	214	9.3	23	0	1	0
2022	GB	17	17	6	66	11.0	31	2	0	0
2023	CHI	17	4	4	29	7.3	16	1	0	0
2024	CHI	17	4	1	2	2.0	2	0	0	0
2025	DEN	5	1	0	0	0.0	0	0	0	0
Career		290	230	437	5,115	11.7	63	40	5	3

Postseason

Year	Team	Games		Receiving					Fumbles	
Year	Team	GP	GS	Rec	Yds	Avg	Lng	TD	Fum	Lost
2007	JAX	2	2	6	90	15.0	34	0	1	0
2017	JAX	3	3	4	21	5.3	16	1	0	0
2019	GB	2	2	2	14	7.0	11	0	0	0
2020	GB	2	2	3	28	9.3	14	0	0	0
2021	GB	1	1	1	0	0.0	0	0	1	1
Career		10	10	16	153	9.6	34	1	2	1

=== College ===
Season	Team	GP	Rec	Yds	Avg	Lng	TD
2002	UCLA	12	6	51	8.5	16	1
2003	UCLA	13	30	377	12.6	38	3
2004	UCLA	12	32	402	12.6	29	7
2005	UCLA	12	58	741	12.8	40	10
Total		49	126	1,571	12.5	40	21
