= Mike Thomas (wide receiver, born 1987) =

American football player (born 1987)

No. 80, 19
- Position: Wide receiver

Personal information
- Born: June 4, 1987 (age 39); Bossier City, Louisiana, U.S.
- Listed height: 5 ft 8 in (1.73 m)
- Listed weight: 198 lb (90 kg)

Career information
- High school: DeSoto (DeSoto, Texas)
- College: Arizona (2005–2008)
- NFL draft: 2009: 4th round, 107th overall pick

Career history
- Jacksonville Jaguars (2009−2012); Detroit Lions (2012); Arizona Cardinals (2013)*; Houston Texans (2014)*; Toronto Argonauts (2015)*
- * Offseason or practice squad member only

Awards and highlights
- 2× First-team All-Pac-10 (2007, 2008); Pac-10 Co-Freshman of the Year (2005)

Career NFL statistics
- Receptions: 176
- Receiving yards: 1,796
- Receiving touchdowns: 7
- Return yards: 1,310
- Return touchdowns: 1
- Stats at Pro Football Reference

Michael Thomas (born June 4, 1987) is an American former professional football player who was a wide receiver in the National Football League (NFL). He was selected by the Jacksonville Jaguars in the fourth round of the 2009 NFL draft. He played college football for the Arizona Wildcats.

== Early life ==
Thomas attended DeSoto High School in DeSoto, Texas. As a senior, he had 15 receptions for 205 yards as a receiver and 333 yards on 26 carries as a running back.

== College career ==
Thomas attended the University of Arizona from 2005 to 2008. While there he started 39 of 48 games and set the school and Pac-10 record for receptions with 259 for 3,231 yards and 23 touchdowns.

== Professional career ==
Pre-draft measurables
| Height | Weight | Arm length | Hand span | 40-yard dash | 10-yard split | 20-yard split | 20-yard shuttle | Three-cone drill | Vertical jump | Broad jump |
|---|---|---|---|---|---|---|---|---|---|---|
| 5 ft 7 7/8 in (1.72 m) | 195 lb (88 kg) | 31 in (0.79 m) | 9 3/8 in (0.24 m) | 4.40 s | 1.61 s | 2.50 s | 4.28 s | 6.65 s | 40.5 in (1.03 m) | 10 ft 6 in (3.20 m) |
All values from NFL Combine

=== Jacksonville Jaguars ===
Thomas was selected by the Jacksonville Jaguars in the fourth round of the 2009 NFL draft with the 107th overall pick. As a rookie, he started four of the 14 games in which he played, and had 48 receptions for 453 yards and a touchdown. His 48 receptions were tied with Michael Crabtree for fourth among all rookies.

A key play of his career was in a 2010 Week 10 game against the Texans. With just 3 seconds remaining in regulation and the game tied at 24, QB David Garrard launched a "Hail Mary" pass from the 50-yard line intended for Mike Sims-Walker. The ball was batted down at the goal line by Texans DB Glover Quin, and then hit Thomas in the chest. Thomas was able to grab the ball next to his left knee before it hit the ground, and he took a step forward into the end zone for the game-winning touchdown.

On October 30, 2012, Thomas was traded to the Detroit Lions for a 2014 fifth round draft pick.

=== Detroit Lions ===
Thomas was cut by the Lions on August 19, 2013.

=== Arizona Cardinals ===
On August 20, 2013, Thomas was signed by the Arizona Cardinals. He was released on August 30, 2013.

=== Houston Texans ===
Thomas signed with the Houston Texans on December 30, 2013. On August 31, 2014, Thomas was released.

=== Toronto Argonauts ===
Thomas was signed by the Toronto Argonauts on November 21, 2014. He was released by the Argonauts on May 13, 2015.
