= Don Carey (cornerback) =

American football player (born 1987)

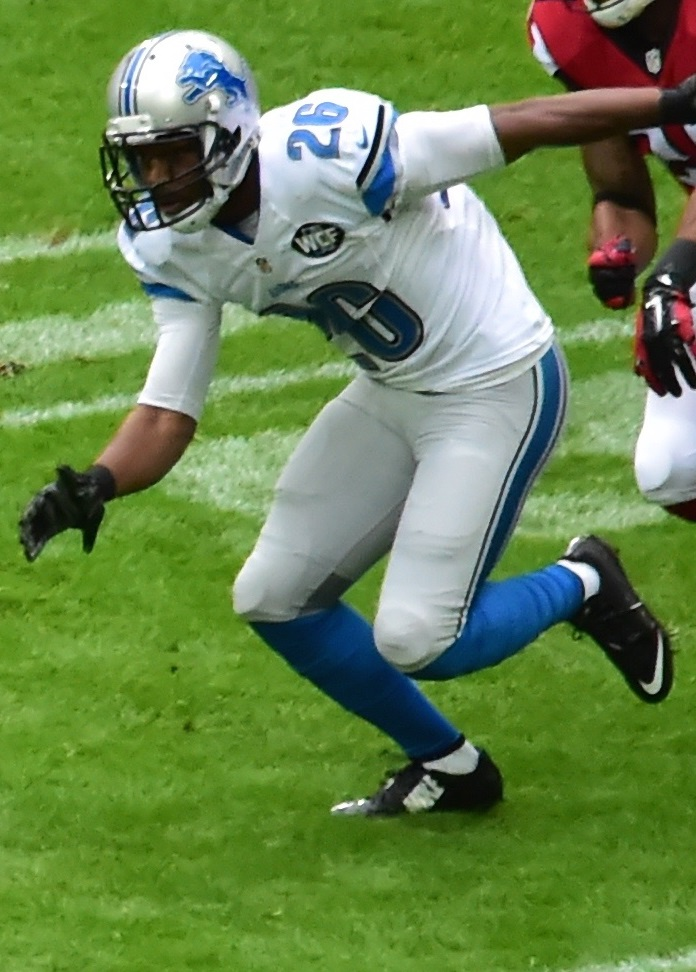
- Carey with the Detroit Lions in 2014

Profile
- Position: Safety

Personal information
- Born: February 14, 1987 (age 39); Grand Rapids, Michigan, U.S.
- Listed height: 5 ft 11 in (1.80 m)
- Listed weight: 192 lb (87 kg)

Career information
- High school: Booker T. Washington (Norfolk, Virginia)
- College: Norfolk State
- NFL draft: 2009: 6th round, 177th overall pick

Career history
- Cleveland Browns (2009)*; Jacksonville Jaguars (2009–2010); Detroit Lions (2011−2017); Jacksonville Jaguars (2018)*; Detroit Lions (2018)
- * Offseason or practice squad member only

Awards and highlights
- 2× Second-team All-MEAC (2007, 2008)

Career NFL statistics
- Total tackles: 190
- Pass deflections: 8
- Interceptions: 3
- Forced fumbles: 3
- Fumble recoveries: 2
- Defensive touchdowns: 1
- Stats at Pro Football Reference

Don Juan Carey III (born February 14, 1987) is an American former professional football player who was a safety in the National Football League (NFL). He played college football for the Norfolk State Spartans and was selected by the Cleveland Browns in the sixth round of the 2009 NFL draft. He was also a member of the Jacksonville Jaguars and Detroit Lions.

Carey was later elected to the Chesapeake, Virginia city council. In 2024, Don Carey also decided to run as a Democratic candidate for mayor of Chesapeake, VA, against the current Republican mayor, Rick West.

== Early life ==
Prior to attending Norfolk State, Carey went to Booker T. Washington High School in Norfolk, Virginia.

== Professional career ==
Pre-draft measurables
| Height | Weight | 40-yard dash | 10-yard split | 20-yard split | 20-yard shuttle | Three-cone drill | Vertical jump | Broad jump | Bench press |
|---|---|---|---|---|---|---|---|---|---|
| 5 ft 11 in (1.80 m) | 197 lb (89 kg) | 4.48 s | 1.59 s | 2.69 s | 4.20 s | 6.87 s | 32 1/2 in (0.83 m) | 10 ft 2 in (3.10 m) | 18 reps |
All values from the NFL Combine/Norfolk State's Pro Day

=== Cleveland Browns ===
The Cleveland Browns selected Carey in the sixth round (177th overall) of the 2009 NFL draft. He was the 24th cornerback drafted in 2009.

On July 14, 2009, the Browns signed Carey to a four-year, $1.86 million contract that includes a signing bonus of $116,750.

Throughout training camp, he competed for a roster spot as a backup cornerback against Hank Poteat, Corey Ivy, Gerard Lawson, and Coye Francies. On August 6, 2009, the Cleveland Browns waived Carey due to a shoulder injury.

=== Jacksonville Jaguars (first stint) ===
On August 7, 2009, the Jacksonville Jaguars claimed Carey off of waivers. The Jacksonville Jaguars were criticized for claiming Carey as it was expected the Browns would've placed him on injured reserve after clearing waivers. On September 1, 2009, the Jaguars placed him on injured reserve due to his shoulder injury that kept him sidelined for the remainder of the season.

During training camp in 2010, he competed for a roster spot as a backup cornerback against Tyron Brackenridge, William Middleton, Scotty McGee, Josh Gordy, and Chris Hawkins.

Carey was waived by the Jaguars prior to the start of the 2011 season.

=== Detroit Lions (first stint) ===
The Detroit Lions signed Carey on October 25, 2011. He was released on August 20, 2012, and was re-signed on November 1, 2012 after Bill Bentley was placed on injured reserve. He saw action in nine games (six starts), providing an immediate impact on defense and special teams, totaling 12 special teams tackles (10 solo) to go along with his 27 tackles (19 solo) on defense.

In 2013, Carey was a versatile option at nickel and a source of stability to the Lions secondary and special teams coverage unit. Totaled 19 tackles (16 solo), two pass defenses and finished second on the team in special teams tackles with 11 (eight solo). He had a breakout performance at Pittsburgh on November 17 where he started at linebacker and had a career-high nine tackles.

In 2014, Carey missed only three games due to a hamstring injury, and started three of his 13 games. He finished the season with seven tackles (six solo), one fumble recovery and five special teams tackles. On January 10, 2014, Carey signed a three-year contract extension with the Lions.

In 2015, Carey led the NFL in solo special teams tackles with 14, and tied for second in total special teams tackles with 16. He recorded a special teams tackle in 11 of the 16 games during the season.

And in 2016, Carey was nominated as the Lions's Walter Payton Man of the Year, including for his contribution to "Athletes for Charity [working] to install a youth literacy program at two Detroit area schools, with a focus on STEM — a curriculum centered around science, technology, engineering and mathematics."

Carey signed a one-year contract extension with the Lions through 2017 on November 16, 2016.

=== Jacksonville Jaguars (second stint) ===
On March 14, 2018, Carey signed with the Jaguars. He was placed on injured reserve on August 21, due to a hamstring injury. Carey was released by Jacksonville on August 28.

=== Detroit Lions (second stint) ===
On November 20, 2018, Carey was signed by the Lions, only to be released three days later.

== Personal life ==
Carey announced he would retire from the NFL and would move to Chesapeake, Virginia on April 27, 2019, where he lives with his wife, Lakeisha, an attorney, and their three children. During Carey's stint in the NFL, he and his wife established the REECH Foundation—Reaching, Educating and Empowering Our Children—and now operate it out of the Tidewater region of Virginia, where they reside. The Foundation is focused on "STEM [Education] (Science, Technology, Engineering, & Math), physical wellbeing, health, social and moral responsibility along with vocational and collegiate preparation."

Don's younger brother Donte played defensive back for Grand Valley State, a Division II school in Allendale, Michigan.

== Political career ==
Carey ran for and won a seat on the Chesapeake, Virginia city council in 2020. The race was non-partisan and Carey was listed as an independent. Carey placed first in a field of seven candidates and was sworn into office on July 1.

Carey announced his run for Mayor of Chesapeake, Virginia on March 24, 2024. The race is non-partisan but Carey, who was previously endorsed by the local Republican party, switched parties and is now endorsed by the local Democratic Party. Carey lost to the incumbent mayor.

=== Electoral history ===
2020 Chesapeake At-Large City Council election
| Party | Candidate | Votes | % |
|---|---|---|---|
| Nonpartisan | Don Juan Carey, III | 17,693 | 19.7 |
| Nonpartisan | Susan Zimet Ritter (inc.) | 17,569 | 19.6 |
| Nonpartisan | Robert Clifton Ike, Jr. (inc.) | 15,979 | 17.8 |
| Nonpartisan | Dwight M. Parker (inc.) | 13.029 | 14.5 |
| Nonpartisan | Lessie Smith, Jr. | 12,278 | 13.7 |
| Nonpartisan | Sharon Johnson-Clayton | 9,157 | 10.2 |
| Nonpartisan | Victoria Teresa Anastasia Nicholls | 3,503 | 3.9 |
| | Write-in | 550 | 0.0 |
| Total votes | | 89,758 | 100 |
