= Larry Hart (American football) =

American football player (born 1987)

No. 59
- Position: Defensive end

Personal information
- Born: July 16, 1987 (age 39); Madison, Mississippi, U.S.
- Listed height: 6 ft 1 in (1.85 m)
- Listed weight: 248 lb (112 kg)

Career information
- High school: Madison (MS) Central
- College: Central Arkansas
- NFL draft: 2010: 5th round, 143rd overall pick

Career history
- Jacksonville Jaguars (2010); Virginia Destroyers (2012)

Career NFL statistics
- Games played: 14
- Total tackles: 9
- Sacks: 1.5
- Pass deflections: 1
- Stats at Pro Football Reference

Larry Darnell Hart Jr. (born July 16, 1987) is an American former professional football player. He was selected in the 2010 NFL draft by the Jacksonville Jaguars. He played defensive end and outside linebacker for Central Arkansas. He also played at Holmes Community College.

== Early life ==
Hart was born in Madison, Mississippi.

== Professional career ==
=== Jacksonville Jaguars ===
He was selected by the Jacksonville Jaguars with the 143rd overall pick in the fifth round of the 2010 NFL draft.

Hart was released from the Jaguars on September 3, 2011.

=== Virginia Destroyers ===
Hart played for the Virginia Destroyers in 2012.
