= William Middleton (American football) =

American football player (born 1986)

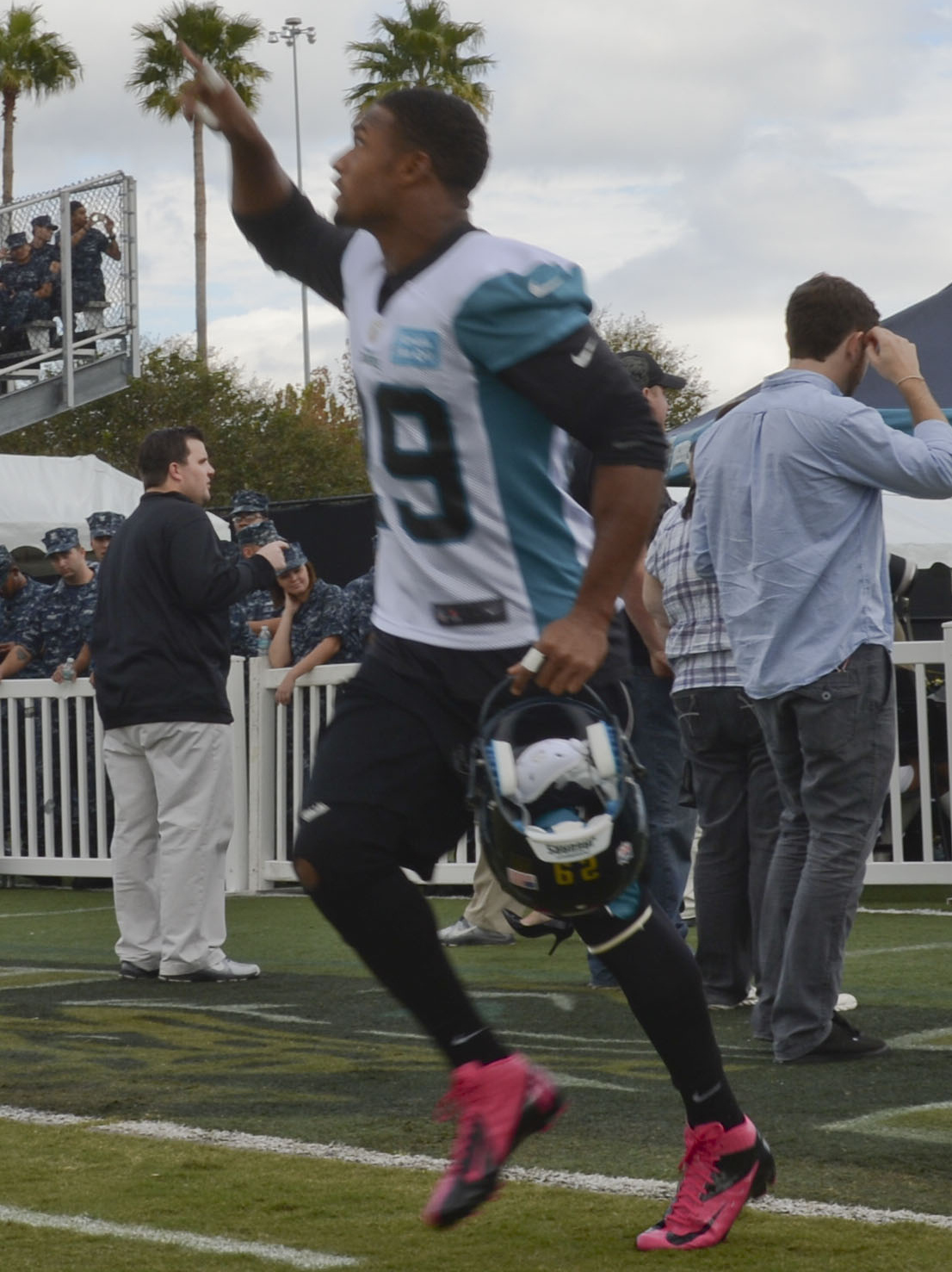
- Middleton with the Jacksonville Jaguars in 2009

No. 35, 29
- Position: Cornerback

Personal information
- Born: July 28, 1986 (age 40); New York, New York, U.S.
- Listed height: 5 ft 10 in (1.78 m)
- Listed weight: 190 lb (86 kg)

Career information
- High school: Marist (Atlanta, Georgia)
- College: Furman
- NFL draft: 2009: 5th round, 138th overall pick

Career history
- Atlanta Falcons (2009)*; Tampa Bay Buccaneers (2009)*; Atlanta Falcons (2009)*; Jacksonville Jaguars (2009−2012); San Diego Chargers (2013)*
- * Offseason or practice squad member only

Awards and highlights
- First-team Little All-American (2008)

Career NFL statistics
- Total tackles: 125
- Sacks: 1
- Pass deflections: 5
- Interceptions: 2
- Stats at Pro Football Reference

William Middleton (born July 28, 1986) is an American former professional football player who was a cornerback in the National Football League (NFL). He was selected by the Atlanta Falcons in the fifth round of the 2009 NFL draft. He played college football for the Furman Paladins. Middleton was also a member of the Tampa Bay Buccaneers, Jacksonville Jaguars and San Diego Chargers.

== Early life ==
Middleton attended Marist High School where he totaled 148 tackles, 10 interceptions, six pass deflections, two kickoff returns for touchdowns, and two blocked punts. He also recorded a school record 103-yard interception return and averaged 27.0 yards on 21 kickoff returns. He was named First-team All-county and All-region honors in 2003 after helping his squad to a 14-1 record and state championship.

== College career ==
As a senior at Furman he started 12 games, making 95 tackles (38 solo), 8.5 tackles for loss, 13 passes defensed, 5.0 sacks and four interceptions. He was a First-team Little All-American and All-Conference selection. As a junior in 2007 he started at right cornerback in all 11 games and totaled 53 tackles, including three for-loss, three interceptions, and nine pass deflections. In 2006 Middleton won starting job at right cornerback and helped Furman to an 8-4 campaign that included a third straight playoff appearance. He compiled 38 tackles, including four for a loss, four passes defensed, and a pair of fumble recoveries. He also led the team in kickoff returns averaging 23.1 yards on 25 returns, good for fourth in the Southern Conference. In 2005, he registered playing time as both a backup cornerback and kickoff return specialist. He averaged 22.0 yards on 32 returns and ranked fourth in the Southern Conference in kickoff return average.

== Professional career ==
Pre-draft measurables
Height	Weight	40-yard dash	10-yard split	20-yard split	20-yard shuttle	Three-cone drill	Vertical jump	Broad jump	Bench press
5 ft 9 3/8 in (1.76 m)	193 lb (88 kg)	4.42 s	1.48 s	2.56 s	4.37 s	7.33 s	36.5 in (0.93 m)	10 ft 9 in (3.28 m)	21 reps
All values from Pro Day

=== Atlanta Falcons (first stint) ===
Middleton was selected by the Atlanta Falcons in the fifth round of the 2009 NFL draft with the 138th overall pick. He was waived by the team on September 5, 2009.

=== Tampa Bay Buccaneers ===
Middleton was claimed off waivers by the Tampa Bay Buccaneers on September 6, 2009, only to be released on September 10.

=== Atlanta Falcons (second stint) ===
Middleton was re-signed to the Falcons' practice squad on September 14, 2009.

=== Jacksonville Jaguars ===
Middleton was signed off the Falcons' practice squad by the Jacksonville Jaguars on September 20, 2009.

He was placed on injured reserve on November 27, 2012.

=== San Diego Chargers ===
On July 28, 2013, Middleton signed with the San Diego Chargers. He was released on August 30, 2013.

== NFL career statistics ==
Legend
**Bold**	Career high

Year	Team	Games		Tackles					Interceptions					Fumbles			
Year	Team	GP	GS	Cmb	Solo	Ast	Sck	TFL	Int	Yds	TD	Lng	PD	FF	FR	Yds	TD
2009	JAX	12	0	20	18	2	0.0	1	0	0	0	0	0	0	0	0	0
2010	JAX	16	3	**47**	**43**	4	**1.0**	**2**	**1**	2	0	2	1	0	0	0	0
2011	JAX	11	6	38	32	**6**	0.0	1	**1**	**11**	0	**11**	**3**	0	0	0	0
2012	JAX	10	3	20	15	5	0.0	0	0	0	0	0	1	0	0	0	0
		49	12	125	108	17	1.0	4	2	13	0	11	5	0	0	0	0
