= Terrell Whitehead =

American football player (born 1988)

No. 43
- Position: Free Safety

Personal information
- Born: September 18, 1988 (age 38); Virginia Beach, Virginia
- Listed height: 6 ft 1 in (1.85 m)
- Listed weight: 194 lb (88 kg)

Career information
- College: Norfolk State
- NFL draft: 2010: undrafted

Career history
- Jacksonville Jaguars (2010–2011)
- Stats at Pro Football Reference

Terrell Whitehead (born September 18, 1988) is an American former football free safety. He was signed by the Jacksonville Jaguars as an undrafted free agent in 2010. He played college football at Norfolk State.

== Jacksonville Jaguars ==
Whitehead was signed as an undrafted free agent by the Jacksonville Jaguars after the 2010 NFL draft. Whitehead was placed on injured reserve August 9, 2010.

== Personal life ==
He resides in Virginia Beach, Virginia. He attended Kempsville High School in Virginia Beach, Virginia. He has a son named, Tayron Kaleb.
