= Courtney Greene =

American football player (born 1986)

No. 36
- Position: Safety

Personal information
- Born: November 23, 1986 (age 39); New Rochelle, New York, U.S.
- Listed height: 6 ft 0 in (1.83 m)
- Listed weight: 215 lb (98 kg)

Career information
- High school: New Rochelle
- College: Rutgers
- NFL draft: 2009: 7th round, 245th overall pick

Career history
- Seattle Seahawks (2009)*; Jacksonville Jaguars (2009–2012); Hamilton Tiger-Cats (2013)
- * Offseason or practice squad member only

Career NFL statistics
- Total tackles: 83
- Forced fumbles: 1
- Fumble recoveries: 1
- Interceptions: 1
- Pass deflections: 4
- Stats at Pro Football Reference

Courtney Greene (born November 23, 1986) is an American former professional football player who was a safety in the National Football League (NFL). He was selected by the Seattle Seahawks in the 2009 NFL draft and played three seasons for the Jacksonville Jaguars. He played college football for the Rutgers Scarlet Knights.

== Early life ==
Greene starred at New Rochelle High School alongside future college teammates Ray Rice and Glenroy Lee. He led New Rochelle to the Class AA state championship in 2003, in which he earned MVP honors. Greene prepped during the 2004 season at Bridgton Academy.

== College career ==
Joining his fellow New Rochelle alumni at Rutgers University, Greene stepped into the starting lineup as a true freshman. He immediately established himself as a playmaker, leading the team in tackles with 116, en route to being named a Freshman All-American by Rivals, The Sporting News, College Football News, and the Football Writers Association of America. As a sophomore in 2006, Greene was named Second-team All-Big East, starting every game and helping to lead Rutgers to its best football season in three decades.

In 2007, Greene was named to the Preseason Watch List for the Nagurski Trophy, and was a consensus preseason First-team All-Big East selection. In 2008, he was named to the All-Big East first-team.

== Professional career ==
Greene was selected by the Seattle Seahawks in the seventh round of the 2009 NFL draft. He played three seasons for the Jacksonville Jaguars from 2009 to 2011. He appeared in 30 games and had 90 tackles.
