= Maurice Jones-Drew =

American football player (born 1985)

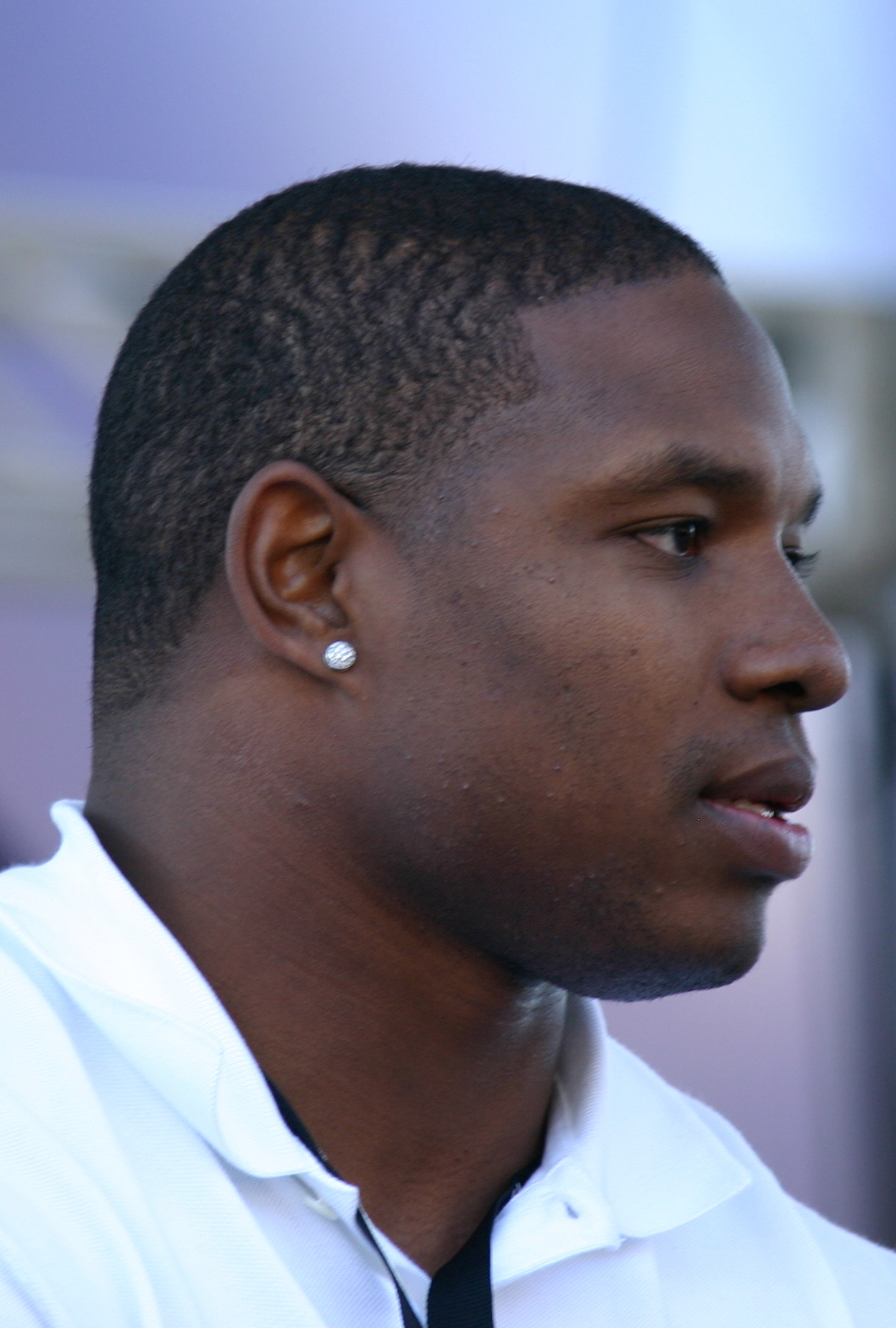
- Jones-Drew in 2010

No. 32, 21
- Position: Running back

Personal information
- Born: March 23, 1985 (age 41); Oakland, California, U.S.
- Listed height: 5 ft 7 in (1.70 m)
- Listed weight: 210 lb (95 kg)

Career information
- High school: De La Salle (Concord, California)
- College: UCLA (2003–2005)
- NFL draft: 2006: 2nd round, 60th overall pick

Career history
- Jacksonville Jaguars (2006–2013); Oakland Raiders (2014)

Awards and highlights
- First-team All-Pro (2011); 3× Pro Bowl (2009–2011); NFL rushing yards leader (2011); 2× NFL Alumni Running Back of the Year (2010, 2011); NFL Alumni Player of the Year (2011); PFWA All-Rookie Team (2006); Unanimous All-American (2005); NCAA average punt return yards leader (2005); First-team All-Pac-10 (2005); Second-team All-Pac-10 (2004)

Career NFL statistics
- Rushing yards: 8,167
- Rushing average: 4.4
- Rushing touchdowns: 68
- Receptions: 346
- Receiving yards: 2,944
- Receiving touchdowns: 11
- Stats at Pro Football Reference

Maurice Christopher Jones-Drew (born March 23, 1985), often called "MJD", is an American former professional football player who was a running back in the National Football League (NFL) for nine seasons. He played college football for the UCLA Bruins, earning unanimous All-American honors in 2005.

Jones-Drew was selected by the Jacksonville Jaguars in the second round of the 2006 NFL draft. He was named to the Pro Bowl three times, and led the NFL in rushing yards in 2011. He played his first eight seasons with the Jaguars, through 2013. In his final season in 2014, he played for the Oakland Raiders.

Following his retirement, Jones-Drew entered broadcasting, serving as a football color analyst for NFL Now and other shows on NFL Network, in addition to hosting for CBS Sports their Monday Night studio show for their UK networks. He is currently the color analyst for the Los Angeles Rams.

== Early life ==
Born in Oakland, California, Jones-Drew was raised in Antioch and graduated from De La Salle High School in Concord.

De La Salle owns the longest winning streak in high school football history at 151 games. The Spartan football teams that Jones-Drew played on never lost a single game during his three-year varsity career. He was an elusive, high-scoring running back and return specialist on offense and a punishing linebacker on defense. Jones-Drew somersaulted into the national consciousness as a high school junior in 2001 when he scored all four of De La Salle's touchdowns in a 29-15 nationally televised victory over Long Beach Poly on October 6. It was the first game that ever matched up the nation's No. 1 and No. 2 ranked high school football teams. On the Spartans' opening drive, Jones-Drew received a short pass in the right flat on third-and-eight from the Poly 25-yard line. He broke a tackle and then sprinted down the right sideline before launching a spectacular forward somersault into the end zone. Drew next scored on a 29-yard reception on fourth down in which he ran a circle route out of the backfield down the left sideline and hauled in an over-the-shoulder touch pass at the goal line from quarterback Matt Gutierrez. Drew's third touchdown came in the second quarter when he burst through the line, shook off two tacklers, before hitting paydirt 17 yards later. Drew's final score salted away the historic De La Salle victory. It was a similar effort to his third touchdown and came on a 22-yard run with just under seven minutes remaining. Drew finished with nine carries for 86 yards and three catches for another 79 yards.

During his junior season, Jones-Drew rushed for nearly 2,000 yards, averaged nearly 12 yards per carry, and scored 26 touchdowns. He was rated as a four-star recruit and ranked as the No. 1 all-purpose back in the nation in 2003 by Rivals.com. He is pictured outrunning a slew of defenders on the cover of the book When the Game Stands Tall, which chronicles the De La Salle Spartans' all-time-record 151-game winning streak.

Jones-Drew also ran track for the De La Salle track team and was a member of the Spartans' 4 x 100 metres relay state championship meet team of 2002, which posted a non-finals-qualifying time of 42.20 seconds during the meet's preliminaries. At the age of 16, he posted a personal best time of 10.80 seconds in the 100 meters. He also ran for the Bruins' track team at UCLA.

== College career ==
Jones-Drew accepted a football scholarship to University of California, Los Angeles (UCLA), where he played for the Bruins under head coach Karl Dorrell from 2003 to 2005. Despite being undersized, Jones-Drew led the Bruins in rushing all three years he was on the squad and showed good pass catching ability and big playmaking skills as both a punt and kickoff returner. He was the fifth player in Bruins history to lead the team in rushing in three seasons.

In 2005, Jones-Drew set an all-time NCAA single-season record with a 28.5 yards per return average on 15 punt returns, breaking the previous record of 25.9 yards per return held by Bill Blackstock of Tennessee in 1951. His career average of 23.2 yards per punt return ranks second in NCAA history. Jones-Drew also established a number of UCLA records, including the career all-purpose yardage record (4,688 yards). As a sophomore against Washington, Jones-Drew set UCLA's all-time record for yards rushing in a single game (322 yards) and also scored a school-record five touchdowns.

On his first carry of the game, he burst to the outside and raced 47 yards to tie the game at 7–7. On his second carry, with UCLA trailing 24-7 and 2:30 remaining in the first quarter, he raced 62 yards for another touchdown. On his fourth carry, a third-and-12 with 40 seconds left in the first quarter, he sped 58 yards for his third touchdown. In the first quarter alone, he rushed for 169 yards and three touchdowns on four attempts. He gave the Bruins the lead for good (27–24) with 4:16 remaining in the first half when he scooted around right end for a 15-yard touchdown. In the third quarter, he broke numerous tackles en route to his school-record fifth touchdown, a 37-yard run on the Bruins' first possession of the half. His total of 322 yards rushing was the 3rd most in the history of the Pac-10 Conference, and his overall performance earned him several National Player of the Week awards.

His final year in college, his junior year, he was a first-team All-Pac-10 selection as a punt returner, and was recognized as a unanimous All-American as an all-purpose back and kick returner. He was also the first Bruin since Jackie Robinson to lead the country in punt returning, and his three punt-return touchdowns were the most in the nation. Additionally, Jones-Drew was named second-team All-Pac 10 as a running back. Jones-Drew gave a sign of things to come when, as a freshman, he rushed for 176 yards on only 18 carries against Arizona State, including an 83-yard scamper down the left sideline to the end zone which put UCLA ahead in the game for good in the third quarter. The run was the longest ever by a Bruin true freshman and ranked ninth (tied) overall on the school's list of long runs. His 176-yard day ranks No. 2 on UCLA's all-time list for true freshmen. Jones-Drew led the Bruins in rushing that season, becoming the first true freshman to lead the Bruins in rushing since DeShaun Foster in 1998. He was also named first-team All-Pac 10 as a kick returner by The Sporting News. In his collegiate career, Jones-Drew had 16 touchdowns of 40-plus yards.

== Professional career ==
Pre-draft measurables
Height	Weight	Arm length	Hand span	40-yard dash	10-yard split	20-yard split	20-yard shuttle	Three-cone drill	Vertical jump	Broad jump	Bench press
5 ft 6 3/4 in (1.70 m)	207 lb (94 kg)	28 1/8 in (0.71 m)	8 1/4 in (0.21 m)	4.39 s	1.53 s	2.57 s	4.38 s	7.08 s	36 in (0.91 m)	9 ft 8 in (2.95 m)	18 reps
All values from NFL Combine

=== Jacksonville Jaguars ===
==== 2006 season ====
Jones-Drew, age 21, was selected in the second round of the 2006 NFL draft by the Jacksonville Jaguars, 60th overall, to eventually replace veteran running back Fred Taylor. He was passed on by all 32 teams in the draft, most citing his height (5 ft 6¾ in, 169.5 cm) as the reason why he would not succeed in the NFL. He stated this was the reason he choose to wear 32 as his jersey number in the NFL.

In the beginning, he was used mostly for kick-off returns, but he eventually became the Jaguars' primary third-down running back, behind Taylor. Against the Colts on December 10, Jones-Drew set a franchise record with 166 rushing yards and 303 all-purpose yards, which included a 93-yard kickoff return for touchdown. He was named AFC Special Teams Player of the Week for Week 14. He had already broken Jaguars team records by scoring at least one rushing touchdown in eight consecutive games (the previous record was four straight games) and by gaining 2,250 all-purpose yards.

Jones-Drew finished third in the NFL in both kickoff returns (27.7 yd avg) and touchdowns scored (16). He was also one of only two players in the NFL to score at least one touchdown rushing, receiving, and returning kicks (Reggie Bush was the other). Jones-Drew also led all AFC running backs in scrimmage yards per touch. Narrowly missing 1,000 yards for the season, his rushing average of 5.7 yds per carry was first in the NFL for backs with 100 attempts and was the highest for an NFL running back since Barry Sanders averaged 6.1 yards per rush in 1997. In addition, he had the third-most all-purpose yards of any rookie in history.

He finished tied for second in the balloting for Offensive Rookie of the Year, awarded to quarterback Vince Young of the Tennessee Titans.

==== 2007 season ====
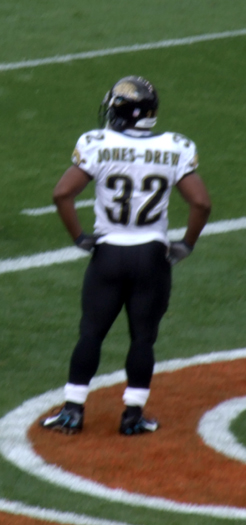
Jones-Drew in 2007

In his second season in the NFL, Jones-Drew had already proven to be one of the most versatile running backs in the league.

In his 2007 season debut, Jones-Drew's production was just average. During a 13–10 loss against the Tennessee Titans, Jones-Drew had 32 yards on seven carries in a game that produced just 48 rushing yards between Jones-Drew and Fred Taylor combined. Jones-Drew's fumble at the 8-yard line in the 4th quarter was the last scoring opportunity for the Jaguars in that game. Promises that the running game would get better as the season progressed were realized when Jones-Drew celebrated his first touchdown of the year in the fourth game of the season, a 17–7 win against the Kansas City Chiefs.

The following week against the Houston Texans, Jones-Drew rushed for 125 yards and two touchdowns on 12 carries to go along with four receptions for 59 yards. In Week 10, he rushed for 101 yards and a touchdown against the Tennessee Titans. He would score a touchdown in each of the following three weeks. In Week 16 against the Oakland Raiders, he had 140 scrimmage yards and a rushing touchdown in the 49–11 victory. He finished the season with 167 carries for 768 rushing yards and nine rushing touchdowns to go along with 40 receptions for 407 receiving yards.

Although his role as a running back was diminished during the 2007 postseason, he still managed to impact the game with his capabilities as a receiver and a return man. In the Wild Card Round against Pittsburgh he totaled 198 all-purpose yards and two touchdowns. His first touchdown was a 43-yard pass from David Garrard, his second was a 10-yard run which put the Jaguars up 28–10 in the third quarter. He returned a kick-off 96 yards to set up the Jaguars' first score of the night, a Fred Taylor one-yard run. The Jaguars defeated the Steelers 31–29. A week later against New England, he had 68 scrimmage yards in the 31–20 loss in the Divisional Round.

==== 2008 season ====
Three Jaguars offensive linemen were injured in the 2008 season and Jones-Drew was not as explosive as he was in 2007. His first 100-yard rushing game of the season came against the Indianapolis Colts, where the Jaguars won by a score of 23–21 on a last second field goal by kicker Josh Scobee in Week 3. In Week 6 against the Denver Broncos, he totaled 22 carries for 125 rushing yards and two rushing touchdowns in the 24–17 victory. In Week 10 against the struggling Detroit Lions, where Jones-Drew posted three touchdowns, all in the first half. In Week 12, against the Minnesota Vikings, he had nine receptions for 113 receiving yards. In Week 16, Jones-Drew was given the opportunity to carry the load with Fred Taylor on injured reserve. He totaled 162 scrimmage yards in a 31–24 loss to the Colts.

In the 2008 season, Jones-Drew gained 824 yards on 197 attempts, posting a 4.2 yard per carry average. He gained 12 touchdowns on the ground. Jones-Drew was used more in the passing game than his previous seasons and he managed 525 yards on 62 receptions.

==== 2009 season ====
Following the departure of Taylor, Jones-Drew became the unquestioned starting running back. Jones-Drew had a record-breaking season in 2009 for the Jaguars. In Week 3 against the Houston Texans, he had 23 carries for 119 rushing yards and three rushing touchdowns in the 31–24 victory. He earned AFC Offensive Player of the Week for Week 3. In Week 6, against the St. Louis Rams, he had 178 scrimmage yards and three rushing touchdowns in the 23–20 victory. In a 13–30 loss to the Tennessee Titans during Week 8, Jones-Drew rushed for 177 yards and two touchdowns on only eight carries, one for 80 yards and another for 79 yards. This performance tied Hall of Famer Barry Sanders' record of rushing for two touchdowns in a single game of 75 yards or more, which was set by Sanders in a Week 7 game against the Tampa Bay Buccaneers in 1997. Jones-Drew became the third player to share the record, as San Francisco 49ers running back Frank Gore, also tied Sanders' record in a Week 2 game against the Seattle Seahawks during the same season. In Week 15, he had 140 scrimmage yards, one rushing touchdown, and one receiving touchdown in the 35–31 loss to the Indianapolis Colts.

Overall, Jones-Drew rushed for 1,391 yards on 312 attempts, a 4.5 yards per carry average, and 15 touchdowns. He was also one of the big components in the Jaguars passing attack, as he had 53 receptions for 374 yards and a touchdown. In an article by Thomas George, Jones-Drew had been recognized as the most versatile offensive player in the NFL.

Jones-Drew was selected to the Pro Bowl.

==== 2010 season ====
In Week 4 of the 2010 season, Jones-Drew had 121 scrimmage yards, one rushing touchdown, and one receiving touchdown in a 31–28 victory over the Indianapolis Colts. In Week 8 against the Dallas Cowboys, he had 27 carries for 135 rushing yards in the 35–17 victory. In the following game against the Houston Texans, he had 123 scrimmage yards and two rushing touchdowns in the 31–24 victory. In the next game, against the Cleveland Browns, he had 220 scrimmage yards and a rushing touchdown in the 24–20 victory. In Week 13 against the Tennessee Titans, he had 31 carries for 186 rushing yards in the 17–6 victory. Jones-Drew played the entire 2010 season with a torn meniscus in his left knee. He became aware of the extent of the injury in training camp, but tried to keep it a secret to prevent opponents from intentionally taking shots at his knee. He only missed two games during the season. He was named to his second Pro Bowl. After the 2010 season, he was named Running Back of the Year by the NFL Alumni Association.

Although the Jaguars did not make the playoffs, Jones-Drew drew attention in the postseason with comments he made questioning the severity of an in-game injury to Jay Cutler in the NFC Championship Game. Jones-Drew stated that he was also rooting for the Bears, but his injury prompted him to say: "All I'm saying is that he can finish the game on a hurt knee ... I played the whole season on one," as well as comparing Cutler to former University of Florida head coach Urban Meyer. He was ranked 30th by his fellow players on the NFL Top 100 Players of 2011.

==== 2011 season ====
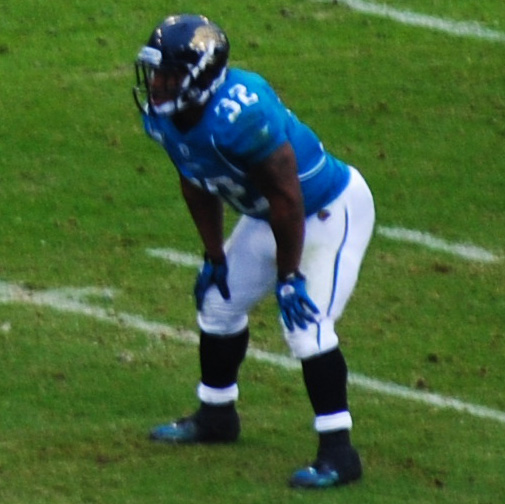
Jones-Drew in 2011

In Week 3, against the Carolina Panthers, Jones-Drew had 167 scrimmage yards in the 16–10 loss. In Week 14 against the Tampa Bay Buccaneers, Jones-Drew had 85 rushing yards, two rushing touchdowns, six receptions, 51 receiving yards, and two receiving touchdowns in the 41–14 victory. He scored 24 total points in the game, which was the most by any player in a single game in the 2011 season. In Week 17, against the Indianapolis Colts, he had 25 carries for 169 rushing yards in the 19–13 victory. He led the NFL in rushing yards during the 2011 season, and broke the Jaguars franchise records for both rushing yards in a season (1,606) and yards from scrimmage (1,980). Jones-Drew did all of this despite the Jaguars' offensive struggles, accounting for 47.7% of the Jaguars yards.

Jones-Drew was named to the 2012 NFL Pro Bowl as a back-up for Baltimore Ravens running back Ray Rice as a result of his spectacular season. He earned first team All-Pro honors. He was 12th by his fellow players on the NFL Top 100 Players of 2012.

==== 2012 season ====
Jones-Drew began the 2012 season by not attending organized team activities or training camp in hopes of signing a new contract with the Jaguars. Jones-Drew had two years remaining on a deal he signed in 2009, according to which his average salary was lower than that of fellow running backs Adrian Peterson, Chris Johnson, LeSean McCoy, Arian Foster, Steven Jackson, DeAngelo Williams, and Marshawn Lynch. There were rumors that he was open to being traded. After missing his team's entire offseason, Jones-Drew ended his holdout and reported to the team's facilities on September 2. In Week 3, against the Indianapolis Colts, he had 28 carries for 177 rushing yards and one rushing touchdown in the 22–17 victory. He was placed on season-ending injured reserve on December 28, 2012. He finished the season with 86 carries for 414 rushing yards and one rushing touchdown to go along with 14 receptions for 86 receiving yards and one receiving touchdown in six games. He was ranked 98th by his fellow players on the NFL Top 100 Players of 2013.

==== 2013 season ====
In 2013, Jones-Drew finished the season with 234 carries for 803 rushing yards and five rushing touchdowns. In addition, he had 43 receptions for 314 receiving yards. After eight seasons with the Jacksonville Jaguars, he became a free agent on March 11, 2014.

=== Oakland Raiders ===
On March 28, 2014, Jones-Drew returned to the Bay Area and signed a three-year deal with the Oakland Raiders. Jones-Drew's season in Oakland was plagued by futility, as he recorded only 96 yards rushing on 43 attempts (averaging 2.2 yards-per-carry) and zero touchdowns. His number of carries would be limited due to the solid performances of teammates Darren McFadden and Latavius Murray.

=== Retirement ===
On March 5, 2015, Jones-Drew announced his retirement from the NFL at age 29. He finished his career as the Jaguars' second leading rusher of all time behind Fred Taylor. On April 28, 2015, he signed a one-day contract to officially retire as a Jaguar.

== Career statistics ==
=== NFL ===
Legend
	Led the league
**Bold**	Career high

Year	Team	Games		Rushing					Receiving					Fumbles	
Year	Team	GP	GS	Att	Yds	Avg	Lng	TD	Rec	Yds	Avg	Lng	TD	Fum	Lost
2006	JAX	16	1	166	941	**5.7**	74	13	46	436	9.5	51	2	1	1
2007	JAX	15	0	167	768	4.6	57	9	40	407	**10.2**	43	0	2	**2**
2008	JAX	16	3	197	824	4.2	46	12	**62**	**565**	9.1	26	2	**6**	**2**
2009	JAX	16	16	312	1,391	4.5	**80**	**15**	53	374	7.1	19	1	2	1
2010	JAX	14	14	299	1,324	4.4	37	5	34	317	9.3	**75**	2	2	**2**
2011	JAX	16	16	**343**	**1,606**	4.7	56	8	43	374	8.7	48	**3**	**6**	1
2012	JAX	6	5	86	414	4.8	59	1	14	86	6.1	13	1	2	0
2013	JAX	15	15	234	803	3.4	48	5	43	314	7.3	17	0	1	1
2014	OAK	12	1	43	96	2.2	13	0	11	71	6.5	12	0	1	0
Career		126	71	1,847	8,167	4.4	80	68	346	2,944	8.5	75	11	23	10

=== College ===
Legend
	Led the NCAA
**Bold**	Career high

Year	Team	G	Rushing				Receiving				Scrimmage				Kick Return				Punt Return			
Year	Team	G	Att	Yds	Avg	TD	Rec	Yds	Avg	TD	Plays	Yds	Avg	TD	Ret	Yds	Avg	TD	Ret	Yds	Avg	TD
2003	UCLA	13	135	582	4.3	5	15	104	6.9	0	150	686	4.6	5	**20**	**533**	**26.7**	**2**	0	0	0	0
2004	UCLA	11	160	**1,007**	**6.3**	8	18	262	14.6	3	178	1,269	**7.1**	11	7	185	26.4	0	10	152	15.2	1
2005	UCLA	12	**186**	914	4.9	**13**	**31**	**453**	**14.6**	**4**	**217**	**1,367**	6.3	**17**	5	69	13.8	0	**15**	**427**	**28.5**	**3**
Total		36	481	2,503	5.2	26	64	819	12.8	7	545	3,322	6.1	33	32	787	24.6	2	25	579	23.2	4

== Career highlights ==
=== Awards and honors ===
NFL

- First-team All-Pro (2011)
- 3× Pro Bowl (2009–2011)
- NFL rushing yards leader (2011)
- 2× NFL Alumni Running Back of the Year (2010, 2011)
- NFL Alumni Player of the Year (2011)
- PFWA All-Rookie Team (2006)
- 3× NFL Top 100 — 30th (2011), 12th (2012), 98th (2013)

College

- Unanimous All-American (2005)
- NCAA average punt return yards leader (2005)
- First-team All-Pac-10 (2005)
- Second-team All-Pac-10 (2004)

=== Jaguars franchise records ===
- Most career touchdowns (81)
- Most career rushing touchdowns (68)
- Most rushing touchdowns in a single season (15 in 2009)
- Most rushing yards in a single season (1,606 in 2011)
- Longest rushing attempt: 80 (tied with Fred Taylor)
- Most career kickoff return touchdowns (2)
- Most career kickoff return yards (2,054)
- Longest kickoff return: 100 yards

== Outside of football ==
Jones-Drew hosts a two-hour radio show on Sirius XM satellite radio titled Runnin' With MJD which focuses on fantasy football talk and strategy.

In 2011, Jones-Drew appeared as himself along with fellow NFL players Brent Grimes and Sidney Rice in a Season 3 episode of the FX comedy The League.

In 2013, Jones-Drew joined the list of other tattooed athletes who have appeared in PETA's "Ink Not Mink" ads, posing shirtless in support of their anti-fur campaign.

At age 28, Jones-Drew resumed his studies at UCLA in 2013 to complete his bachelor's degree, and lived in a dormitory.

Since 2020, Jones-Drew has been an analyst on Channel 5's Monday Night Football coverage in the UK alongside host Kirsten Watson.

In 2023, Jones-Drew was part of the ITV commentary team on Super Bowl LVII alongside Darren Fletcher and Jack Crawford.

== Personal life ==
Born to Sidney Gayles and Andrea Drew, Jones-Drew was raised by his maternal grandparents, Maurice and Christina Jones. At the height of his college career in 2005, his grandfather suffered a heart attack while walking into the Rose Bowl to see Jones-Drew play against Rice University on September 10. Coach Dorrell broke the news to Drew on the sideline during the game, and he ran to the locker room and left to go to the hospital. To honor the man who raised him, he had his entire legal surname affixed to his jersey, making him "Maurice Jones-Drew."

Jones-Drew is a father of three with two sons (Maurice II and Madden) and one daughter (Alayah). He is married to Ashley Jones-Drew (2012–present) He is also a cousin of former Tampa Bay Buccaneers safety T. J. Ward.

Since retiring from the NFL, Jones-Drew has become a vegan.
