= Scotty McGee =

American football player (born 1986)

No. 30
- Position: Kick returner

Personal information
- Born: December 4, 1986 (age 39); Virginia Beach, Virginia, U.S.
- Listed height: 5 ft 8 in (1.73 m)
- Listed weight: 182 lb (83 kg)

Career information
- High school: Ocean Lakes (Virginia Beach, Virginia)
- College: James Madison
- NFL draft: 2010: 6th round, 203rd overall pick

Career history
- Jacksonville Jaguars (2010–2011)
- Stats at Pro Football Reference

Scotty McGee (born December 4, 1986) is an American former professional football cornerback. He played cornerback for James Madison University. McGee was selected by the Jacksonville Jaguars in the sixth round of the 2010 NFL draft. He was placed on the injured reserve list on September 22, 2010. McGee was waived on September 3, 2011.

As a teenager, McGee's older brother Marcus "Moe" McGee was killed in a shooting. McGee founded the Christianity-themed MOETIVS clothing line in his brother's honor. After leaving the NFL, McGee became a grief counselor for the families of violent crime victims. He also began work with the Justice Coalition to support victims of violent crime.

McGee is married with three children.
