= Rashean Mathis =

American football player (born 1980)

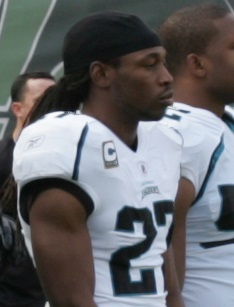
- Mathis with the Jacksonville Jaguars in 2009

No. 27, 31
- Position: Cornerback

Personal information
- Born: August 27, 1980 (age 46); Nashville, Georgia, U.S.
- Listed height: 6 ft 1 in (1.85 m)
- Listed weight: 195 lb (88 kg)

Career information
- High school: Englewood (Jacksonville, Florida)
- College: Bethune–Cookman (1999–2002)
- NFL draft: 2003: 2nd round, 39th overall pick

Career history
- Jacksonville Jaguars (2003–2012); Detroit Lions (2013–2015)

Awards and highlights
- First-team All-Pro (2006); Pro Bowl (2006); Buck Buchanan Award (2002); MEAC Defensive Player of the Year (2002); Div. I-AA All-American (2002); 3× First-team All-MEAC (2000-2002)

Career NFL statistics
- Total tackles: 649
- Forced fumbles: 9
- Fumble recoveries: 5
- Pass deflections: 132
- Interceptions: 32
- Defensive touchdowns: 4
- Stats at Pro Football Reference

Rashean Jamil Mathis (/rəˈʃiːn/ rə-SHEEN; born August 27, 1980) is an American former professional football player who was a cornerback in the National Football League (NFL). He played college football for the Bethune–Cookman Wildcats, and was selected by the Jacksonville Jaguars in the second round of the 2003 NFL draft. He also played for the Detroit Lions. Mathis is regarded as one of the best defensive players in Jaguars history.

== Early life ==
Mathis attended Englewood High School in Jacksonville. He was a highly touted recruit in the state of Florida after his junior year, receiving multiple scholarship offers from major programs, including Florida and Florida State.

I started off very strong my senior year (at Englewood High school) I think I had something like eight interceptions in six games. In that seventh game, I was returning a kickoff and my cleat got stuck in the turf when I was trying to make a cut. My ankle got rolled over and I dislocated it, so I popped it back in place right there on the field and that's when the doctor said I broke my leg.

— Rashean Mathis (2003)

During the seventh game of his senior year, Mathis accidentally got his cleat caught in the turf as he made attempted to make a cut on a kick return and claims he fractured his leg after his ankle dislocated. He was confirmed to have sustained a broken leg and claimed that all of his major scholarship offers were immediately rescinded, including Florida State. Florida State still expressed interest in Mathis joining their team and offered him a position as a walk-on, but Mathis instead accepted a scholarship offer from D-II program Bethune-Cookman University.

Central Florida Community College and Indian River Community Colleges offered him scholarships to play center field.

== College career ==
Although Florida State still expressed interest in Mathis joining their team and offered him a position as a walk-on, Mathis accepted a full athletic scholarship offer from NCAA Division-I-AA program Bethune-Cookman University where he played for the Bethune–Cookman Wildcats football team.

As a freshman in 1999, Mathis had fully-recovered from his broken leg and was immediately able to play as a cornerback and a punt and kick returner on special teams. He immediately garnered the nickname "Show-time" after he was inserted to replace teammate Antonio Stanley as the punt returner and scored a touchdown on the first punt return of his collegiate career. He finished his freshman campaign with two interceptions and nine pass deflections. He moved from cornerback and transitioned to the starting free safety during his sophomore season.

As a senior, Mathis led the Bethune–Cookman Wildcats football team to an 11–2 record playing under head coach Alvin Wyatt for his fourth consecutive season. On November 23, 2002, the Bethune–Cookman Wildcats defeated the Florida A&M Rattlers 37–10 in the Florida Classic to win the MEAC Conference Championship for the first time since 1988.

He capped off his collegiate career with 14 interceptions as a senior in 2002, breaking the NCAA Division I-AA single season record for interceptions as well as interception return yards (667 yards). His performance earned him the distinction as the first defensive back in history to receive the Buck Buchanan Award, which is awarded to the top defensive player in NCAA FCS Division I-AA in 2002. He was a three-time Division I-AA All-America and also holds the career interceptions record for all Division I football divisions, with 31 in his collegiate career. He finished his career with 200 combined tackles, 41 pass deflections, three fumble recoveries, and made three forced fumbles.

== Professional career ==
=== Pre-draft ===
Following an impressive senior season, Mathis was considered as one of the top safeties in the 2003 NFL Draft. Coming from a smaller program, multiple teams expressed concern on his ability to adapt immediately to the professional level. He attended the NFL Scouting Combine and performed all of the combine and positional drills with one of the top performances in the 40-yard dash. Although he only played at cornerback at the start of his collegiate career, many analysts and teams thought he was talented enough to play cornerback in the NFL instead of remaining at safety. The majority of NFL scouts and draft analysts projected that Mathis would be a second round pick in the 2003 NFL Draft. Few had him projected to possibly be selected as early as the late first round. He was ranked as the top free safety prospect by DraftScout.com and was ranked as the second best safety by NFL analyst Mike Mayock. Sporting News had him ranked as the seventh best cornerback prospect in the draft. ESPN analyst Mel Kiper Jr. had Mathis ranked as the third best safety in the draft.

Pre-draft measurables
Height	Weight	40-yard dash	10-yard split	20-yard split	20-yard shuttle	Three-cone drill	Vertical jump	Broad jump	Bench press
6 ft 1 in (1.85 m)	202 lb (92 kg)	4.45 s	1.61 s	2.60 s	4.17 s	7.09 s	38 1/2 in (0.98 m)	10 ft 3 in (3.12 m)	22 reps
All values from NFL Combine

=== Jacksonville Jaguars ===
==== 2003 ====
The Jacksonville Jaguars selected Mathis in the second round (39th overall) of the 2003 NFL draft. He was the second safety drafted in 2003. He was the 28th player selected in the NFL Draft from Bethune-Cookman (since 1967) and the first since Antwuan Wyatt (1997). He also became the third highest draft pick from Bethune-Cookman, following Booker Reese (1982) and Terry Williams (1988).

“We had him targeted as a guy, going into the draft, we wanted to take with this pick. We thought this guy at this particular spot was the best value for us. He's a play-maker. The ball seems to find him. He has size and speed. He gives us the opportunity to try him at two positions in the secondary."

— James "Shack" Harris
(Jaguars' Vice President of Player Personnel)

On July 24, 2003, the Jaguars signed Mathis to a four–year, $3.17 million rookie contract that includes an initial signing bonus of $1.80 million.

During spring mini-camp, Mathis was placed at cornerback, but reverted to playing free safety after training camp officially began. Throughout training camp, Mathis competed against starting veteran Marlon McCree for the role as the primary free safety under new defensive coordinator Mike Smith. Head coach Jack Del Rio named Mathis and Donovan Darius the starting safeties to begin the season.

On September 7, 2003, Mathis made his professional regular season debut and earned his first career start in the Jacksonville Jaguars' season-opener at the Carolina Panthers and made two combined tackles, a pass deflection, and his had the first interception of his career on a pass thrown by Jake Delhomme to wide receiver Steve Smith Sr. as they lost 24–23. On September 16, 2003, the Jaguars released former starting free safety Marlon McCree after Mathis performed well throughout the first two games. On October 12, 2003, Mathis replaced starting cornerback Jason Craft in the second quarter after he suffered a knee injury during a 10–24 loss to the Miami Dolphins. In Week 8, Mathis earned his first start at cornerback and recorded five combined tackles (three solo) and one pass deflection during a 17–30 loss to the Tennessee Titans. Cornerback Jason Craft would miss eight of the last nine games of the season and would never regain his starting role from Mathis. In Week 10, he set a season-high with nine solo tackles during a 28–23 victory against the Indianapolis Colts. The following week, Mathis recorded three solo tackles, made one pass deflection, and intercepted the first pass attempt by Steve McNair during a 3–10 loss at the Tennessee Titans in Week 11. He started in all 16 games as a rookie throughout the 2003 NFL season and made a career-high 81 combined tackles (71 solo), nine pass deflections, and two interceptions.

==== 2004 ====
He entered training camp slated as the No. 1 starting cornerback after Fernando Bryant departed in free agency and Jason Craft was traded to the New Orleans Saints. Head coach Jack Del Rio named Mathis and Dewayne Washington the starting cornerbacks to begin the regular season.

In Week 3, Mathis set a season-high with seven combined tackles (five solo), had two pass deflections, and intercepted a pass by Steve McNair during a 15–12 win at the Tennessee Titans. On November 14, 2004, Mathis made three solo tackles, set a season-high with five pass deflections, and intercepted a pass Joey Harrington threw to tight end Stephen Alexander as the Jaguars defeated the Detroit Lions 17–23 in overtime. On December 19, 2004, Mathis made seven combined tackles (five solo), five pass deflections, and set a season-high with two interceptions off passes Brett Favre threw to Javon Walker and Bubba Franks during a 28–25 victory at the Green Bay Packers. He started all 16 games and recorded 64 combined tackles (54 solo), five interceptions, and one forced fumble. He set a career-high with 21 pass deflections in 2004.

==== 2005 ====
On August 24, 2005, the Jacksonville Jaguars signed Mathis to a five–year, $25.50 million contract extension that included $9.40 million guaranteed and an initial signing bonus of $4.70 million. His contract added an additional five–years to the remaining two–years from his rookie contract and kept his under contract with the Jaguars throughout the 2011 NFL season. The Jaguars selected Scott Starks in the third round (87th overall) of the 2005 NFL draft and also signed Kenny Wright and Terry Cousin. He was named the No. 1 starting cornerback to begin the season and was paired with Kenny Wright.

On October 16, 2005, Mathis made five combined tackles (three solo), two pass deflections, and returned an interception for the first touchdown of his career to lead the Jaguars to a 23–17 overtime victory at the Pittsburgh Steelers. His pick-six occurred after a 17–17 tie necessitated overtime and Mathis intercepted a pass Tommy Maddox threw to wide receiver Quincy Morgan and returned it 41–yards for a touchdown to lead the Jaguars to victory. In Week 8, Mathis recorded five solo tackles, made three pass deflections, and set a season-high with two interceptions on passes by Jamie Martin as the Jaguars lost 21–24 at the St. Louis Rams. In Week 14, he set a season-high with nine combined tackles (seven solo) and had one pass break-up during a 18–36 loss against the Indianapolis Colts. He started all 16 games for the third consecutive season and finished with a total of 69 combined tackles (60 solo), 15 pass deflections, five interceptions, one fumble recovery, and scored one touchdown.

The Jacksonville Jaguars finished the 2005 NFL season in second place in the AFC South with a 12–4 record to earn a Wild-Card position. On January 7, 2006, Mathis started in the first playoff appearance of his career and recorded five solo tackles as the Jaguars lost the AFC Wild-Card Game 3–28 at the New England Patriots.

==== 2006 ====
The Jacksonville Jaguars signed cornerback Brian Williams during free agency to pair with Mathis as the No. 2 starting cornerback. Head coach Jack Del Rio named Mathis as the No. 1 starting cornerback to begin the season and paired him with Brian Williams.

On September 10, 2006, Mathis started in the Jaguars' home-opener against the Dallas Cowboys and recorded five solo tackles, two pass deflections, and intercepted Drew Bledsoe's pass to tight end Jason Witten in their 17–24 victory. The following week, he recorded four solo tackles, set a season-high with four pass deflections, and intercepted two pass attempts by Ben Roethlisberger as the Jaguars defeated the Pittsburgh Steelers 0–9 in Week 2. In Week 9, Mathis made four solo tackles, three pass deflections, and tied his season-high of two interceptions on passes by Vince Young as the Jaguars routed the Tennessee Titans 7–37. On December 31, 2006, Mathis tied his season-high of five solo tackles, made three pass deflections, and set a career-high with his eighth interception of the season after picking off a pass Trent Green threw to wide receiver Eddie Kennison during a 30–35 loss at the Kansas City Chiefs. He started in all 16 games throughout 2006 and recorded 63 combined tackles (56 solo). He had his most productive season in coverage, amassing 21 pass deflections and setting a career-high with eight interceptions to earn a selection to the 2007 Pro Bowl, marking it as his first and only Pro Bowl of his career.

==== 2007 ====
The Jaguars chose to reinforce their secondary following a disappointing 8–8 record the previous season. They selected safety Reggie Nelson in the first round (21st overall) of the 2007 NFL draft and signed Pro Bowlers Aaron Glenn and Sammy Knight. Mathis retained his role as the No. 1 starting cornerback, returning alongside Brian Williams to begin the season.

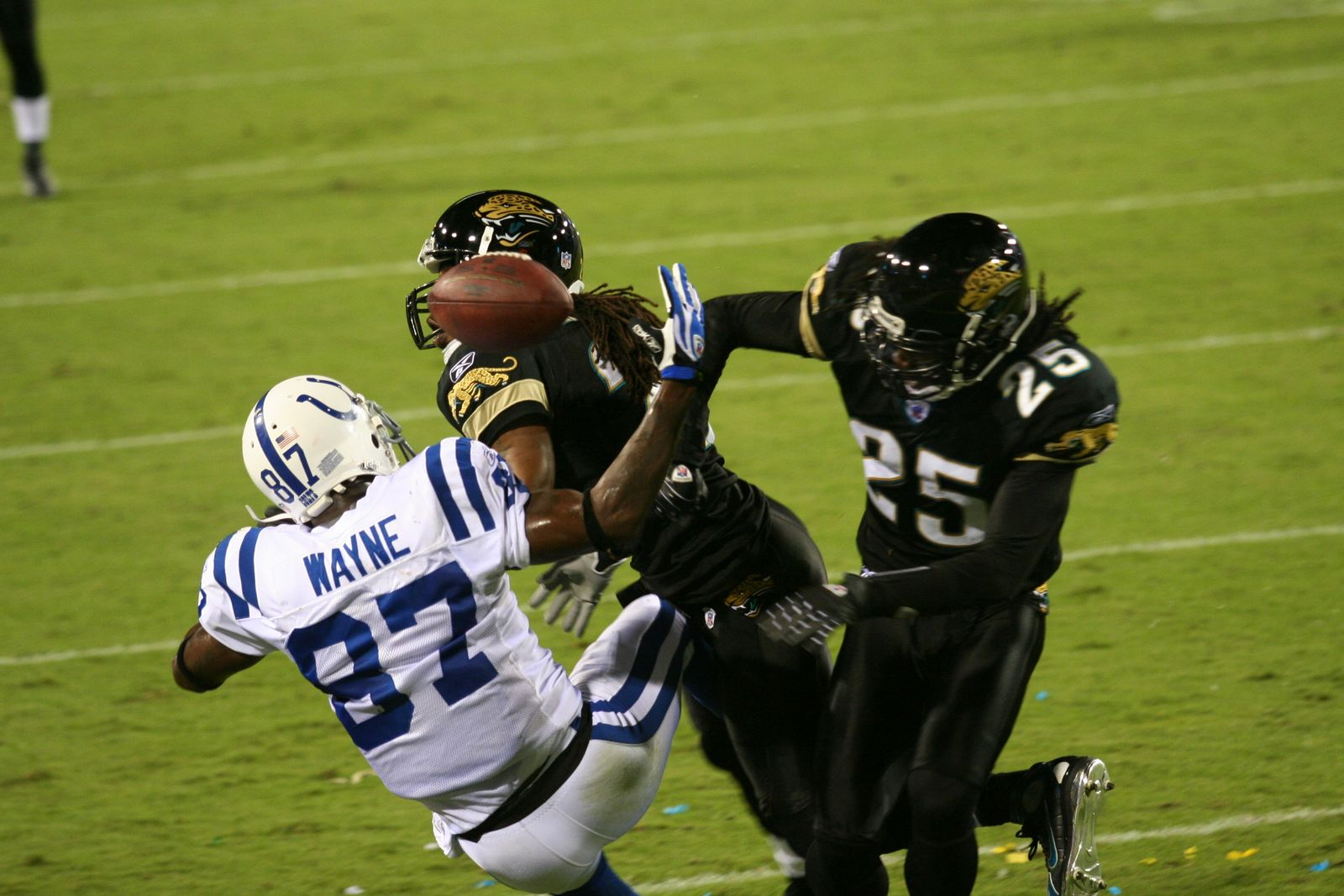
Rashean Mathis and Reggie Nelson against Indianapolis's Reggie Wayne, October 22, 2007

On September 9, 2007, Mathis started in the Jaguars' season-opener at the Tennessee Titans and made three solo tackles, one pass deflection, and had his lone interception of the season on a pass Vince Young threw to wide receiver Eric Moulds as they lost 10–13. In Week 6, he set a season-high with eight solo tackles as the Jaguars defeated the Houston Texans 17–37. He was inactive as the Jaguars defeated the Buffalo Bills 14–37 in Week 12 after injuring his groin. This was his first time missing a game in the NFL and ended a 64–game streak of consecutive starts. Head coach Jack Del Rio listed Mathis as inactive for the Jaguars' 28–42 loss at the Houston Texans in Week 17 after deciding to rest a few starting players in preparation for the playoffs. He finished the season with 59 combined tackles (54 solo), six pass deflections, and only one interception in 14 games and 14 starts.

The Jacksonville Jaguars finished the 2007 NFL season second in the AFC South with an 11–5 record to clinch a Wild-Card berth as the No. 5 seed. On January 5, 2008, Mathis started in the AFC Wild-Card Game at the Pittsburgh Steelers and had one of best overall performances of his career after recording two solo tackles, three pass deflections, two interceptions, and returned one interception for a touchdown during a 31–29 victory. He intercepted a pass Ben Roethlisberger threw to wide receiver Santonio Holmes and returned it for a 63–yard touchdown in the second quarter. On January 12, 2008, he recorded seven solo tackles as the Jaguars lost 20–31 at the New England Patriots in the Divisional Round.

==== 2008 ====
On January 24, 2009, Jacksonville Jaguars' defensive coordinator Mike Smith accepted the head coach position with the Atlanta Falcons. On February 8, 2008, the Jaguars hired Gregg Williams to replace Mike Smith as their defensive coordinator. Following the departures of safety Sammy Knight and cornerback Aaron Glenn, the Jaguars signed cornerback Drayton Florence to takeover as the No. 2 starting cornerback after Brian Williams was tasked to replace Sammy Knight as the starting strong safety.

On September 21, 2008, Mathis recorded three combined tackles (two solo), made one pass deflection, and intercepted a pass Peyton Manning threw to wide receiver Marvin Harrison 61–yards for a touchdown during a 23–21 victory at the Indianapolis Colts. In Week 5, Mathis made one solo tackle, a pass break-up, and intercepted a pass by Ben Roethlisberger to wide receiver Santonio Holmes on the Steelers' first offensive drive and returned it 71–yards for a touchdown during a 26–21 loss to the Pittsburgh Steelers. Entering Week 6, head coach Jack Del Rio benched Drayton Florence after he struggled in zone coverage schemes and moved Brian Williams back to being the No. 2 starting cornerback with Gerald Sensabaugh temporarily taking over as the starting strong safety. In Week 12, he set a season-high with six solo tackles and had his first career sack on Gus Frerotte for a six–yard loss during a 30–12 loss to the Minnesota Vikings. On December 1, 2008, Mathis recorded three solo tackles, had one pass deflection, and intercepted a pass Sage Rosenfels threw to wide receiver Andre Johnson before he did not return after he injured his knee at the end of the second quarter of a 17–30 loss at the Houston Texans. His knee injury occurred in the waning seconds before halftime after a 21–yard field goal attempt by Kris Brown was botched when holder Matt Turk mishandled the snap reception and attempted a desperation pass on a two-point conversion to tight end Owen Daniels that was successfully defended by Mathis before he injured his knee while landing on his feet. On December 3, 2008, the Jaguars officially placed Mathis on season-ending injured reserve after he reportedly suffered an MCL sprain that although, didn't require surgery, was significant enough that it was expected he would unable to recover in time to return within the end of the season that only had four games remaining.

“On the injury front, Rashean Mathis, it looks like in a likelihood he'll be placed on IR. He's got a significant MCL sprain and will need to be immobilized for a few weeks. It won't require any surgery but it's going to need some time to heal properly, and so it's a good likelihood that he'll end up going on IR at some point this week."

— Jack Del Rio
(Jaguars' head coach)

He finished the 2008 NFL season with only 49 combined tackles (40 solo), nine pass deflections, four interceptions, a forced fumble, one fumble recovery, and one sack in 12 games and 12 starts. He set a career-high with two touchdowns on interception returns.

==== 2009 ====
On January 16, 2009, defensive coordinator Gregg Williams accepted the same position with the New Orleans Saints after deciding to mutually part ways the team. On January 25, 2009, the Jacksonville Jaguars hired Mel Tucker to become their new defensive coordinator, but head coach Jack Del Rio chose to handle play-calling duties. The Jaguars selected cornerback Derek Cox in the third round (73rd overall) of the 2009 NFL draft following the departure of Drayton Florence. Mathis retained his role as the de facto No. 1 starting cornerback and was paired with rookie Derek Cox to begin the season.

In Week 5, he set a season-high with six combined tackles (five solo) and had one pass break-up as the Jaguars were routed 0–41 at the Seattle Seahawks. On October 18, 2009, Mathis made two solo tackles, set a season-high with two pass deflections, and intercepted a pass Marc Bulger threw to wide receiver Donnie Avery during a 20–23 victory against the St. Louis Rams. During the game, he sustained a broken index finger that sidelined him for the Jaguars' 13–30 loss at the Tennessee Titans in Week 8. The Jaguars lack of preparation forced them to move starting free safety Reggie Nelson to cornerback for their Week 8 matchup against the Titans. In Week 10, Mathis recorded four combined tackles (three solo), made two pass deflections, a forced fumble, and intercepted a pass by Mark Sanchez to wide receiver Jerricho Cotchery in the first pass of the game during a 24–22 victory at the New York Jets. He injured his groin during the game and remained inactive for the next four games (Weeks 11–14). He returned for two games before re-injuring his groin and was sidelined for the Jaguars' 17–23 loss at the Cleveland Browns in Week 17. He finished the 2009 NFL season with 43 combined tackles (29 solo), seven pass deflections, three interceptions, two forced fumbles, and one fumble recovery in ten games and ten starts.

==== 2010 ====
Mathis requested a contract extension during the off-season, but had his request declined after coming off two injury-riddled seasons. In response, Mathis chose to holdout and did not attend any OTA's, including mini-camp and voluntary off-season workouts. He returned in time for training camp and would not receive a contract extension to remain under contract following the 2011 NFL season. The Jaguars surprisingly did not address their secondary in the 2010 NFL draft or through free agency although they were thoroughly exposed the previous season after Mathis injured his groin. On September 4, 2010, the Jacksonville Jaguars traded starting free safety Reggie Nelson and a conditional draft pick to the Cincinnati Bengals in return for cornerback David Long and a conditional draft pick.

In Week 7, he set a season-high with six solo tackles and made one pass deflection during a 20–42 loss at the Kansas City Chiefs. On October 31, 2010, Mathis recorded four combined tackles (three solo), set a season-high with two pass deflections, and had his lone interception of the season on a pass Jon Kitna threw to wide receiver Roy Williams during a 35–17 victory at the Dallas Cowboys. He started all 16 games throughout the 2010 NFL season for the first time in four years and recorded 56 combined tackles (43 solo), six pass deflections, and one interception.

==== 2011 ====
He returned as the de facto No. 1 starting cornerback to begin the season and was paired with Derek Cox. On September 18, 2011, Mathis set a season-high with seven solo tackles, made one pass deflection, and intercepted a pass Mark Sanchez threw to wide receiver Santonio Holmes during a 3–32 loss at the New York Jets. In Week 10, Mathis recorded one solo tackle before he exited during the second quarter of a 17–3 victory at the Indianapolis Colts after injuring his knee when he planted his foot while running to maintain pass coverage. On November 14, 2011, the Jacksonville Jaguars placed Mathis on season-ending injured reserve after it was confirmed he had a torn ACL and would require surgery. On November 29, 2011, the Jaguars fired head coach Jack Del Rio and appointed defensive coordinator Mel Tucker as the interim head coach after they fell to a 3–8 record. He finished the 2011 NFL season with 34 combined tackles (32 solo), four pass deflections, and one interception in nine games and nine starts.

==== 2012 ====
On January 10, 2012, the Jaguars hired Atlanta Falcons' offensive coordinator Mike Mularkey to be their new head coach. The Jaguars chose to retain Mel Tucker as their defensive coordinator. On March 7, 2012, the Jacksonville Jaguars re-signed Mathis to a one–year, $5 million contract that included a signing bonus of $1 million.

Entering training camp, he was a candidate to earn the role as the No. 2 starting cornerback, but had to compete with Aaron Ross. Mathis' recovery from his torn ACL was slower than expected and hampered his chances of earning a starting role. On August 10, 2012, No. 1 starting cornerback Derek Cox injured his hamstring during a 32–31 victory against the New York Giants. Head coach Mike Mularkey named Mathis as a backup and listed him as the third cornerback on the depth chart to begin the season, behind starting cornerbacks Aaron Ross and William Middleton.

External videos
- Classic Jags: Rashean Mathis

Upon the return of Derek Cox entering Week 3, head coach Mike Mularkey decided to name Mathis and Derek Cox as the starting cornerbacks and moved Aaron Ross to nickelback. In Week 5, he set a season-high with seven solo tackles and made one pa16ss deflection as the Jaguars were routed 3–41 by the Chicago Bears. He suffered a groin injury during a 23–26 overtime loss at the Oakland Raiders in Week 7. He remained inactive for the next four games (Weeks 8–11). He returned in Week 12, but had lost his starting role to Aaron Ross and remained as the primary backup and nickelback for the rest of the season. He finished the 2012 NFL season with 20 solo tackles and five pass deflections in 12 games and four starts.

On March 5, 2013, the Jacksonville Jaguars announced they would not offer Mathis a new contract.

=== Detroit Lions ===
==== 2013 ====
On August 17, 2013, the Detroit Lions signed Mathis to a one–year, $940,000 contract as an unrestricted free agent. The Lions signed Mathis in order for him to compete against Bill Bentley, Ron Bartell, and rookie first-round pick Darius Slay to takeover as the No. 2 starting cornerback. Head coach Jim Schwartz named Mathis a backup cornerback and listed him as the fourth cornerback on the depth chart to begin the season, behind Chris Houston, Darius Slay, and Bill Bentley.

On September 8, 2013, Mathis made his debut in the Detroit Lions' home-opener against the Minnesota Vikings and recorded five combined tackles (three solo) after he was inserted in to replace Darius Slay, who struggled in the 24–34 victory. Entering Week 3, defensive coordinator Gunther Cunningham promoted Mathis to the No. 2 starting cornerback. In Week 10, he set a season-high with eight solo tackles and made two pass deflections during a 21–19 victory at the Chicago Bears. He was inactive as the Lions lost in overtime 20–23 against the New York Giants in Week 16 due to an illness. On December 30, 2013, the Detroit Lions fired head coach Jim Schwartz after finishing the season with a 7–9 record. He finished the 2013 NFL season with 47 combined tackles (44 solo) and 15 pass deflections in 15 games and 13 starts.

==== 2014 ====
On April 14, 2014, the Detroit Lions re-signed Mathis to a one–year, $1.02 million contract that included $565,000 guaranteed and an initial signing bonus of $65,000. He entered training camp expecting to compete for the role as the No. 2 starting cornerback against Darius Slay. On July 13, 2014, the Lions released expected No. 1 starting cornerback Chris Houston due to injury concerns after he continued to have issues with a toe injury that occurred at the end of the previous season. Head coach Jim Caldwell named Mathis and Darius Slay as the starting cornerbacks to begin the season.

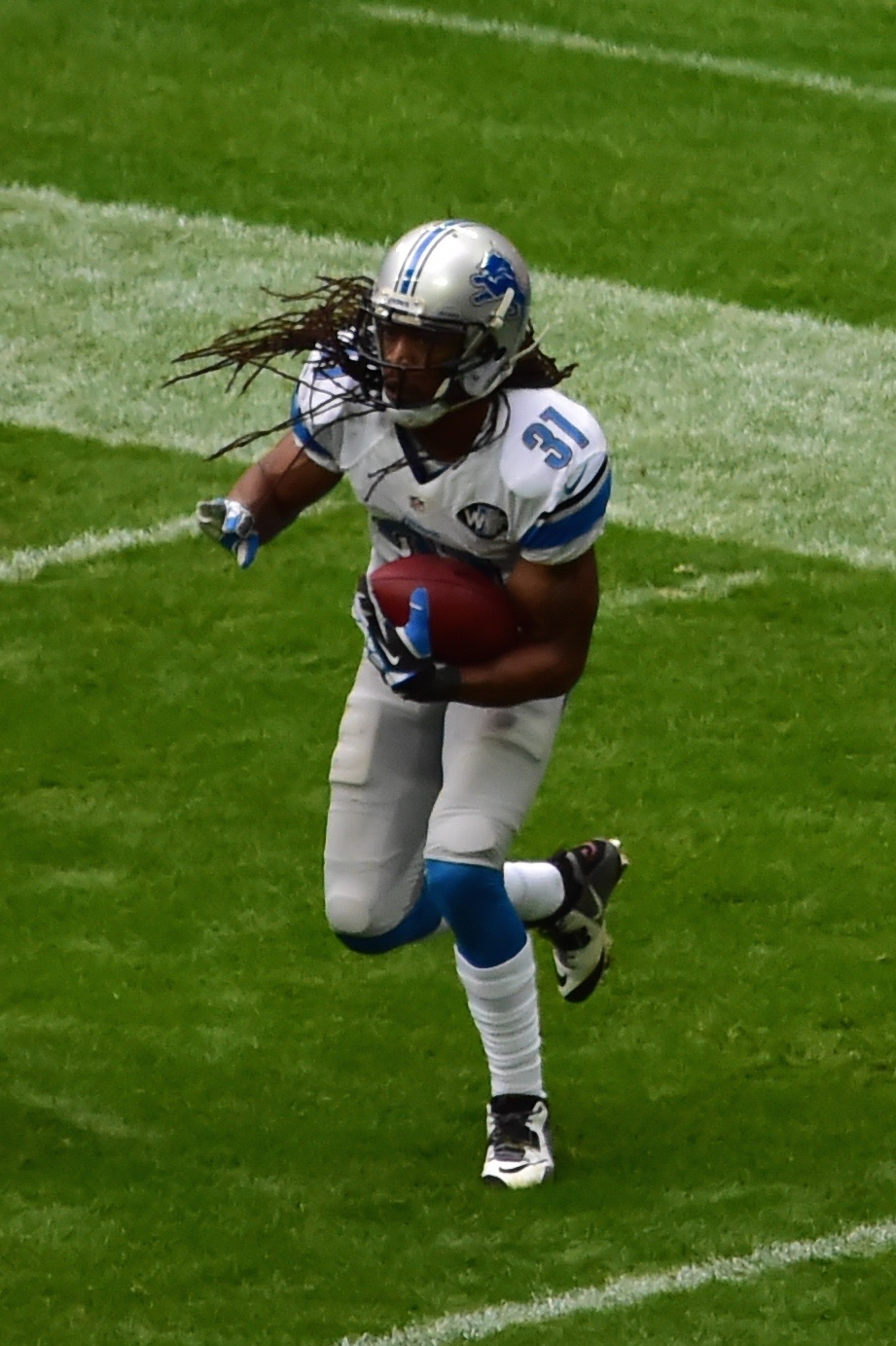
Mathis with the Lions in 2014

On October 5, 2014, Mathis made three solo tackles, one pass deflection, and had a pick-six after he intercepted a pass Kyle Orton threw to wide receiver Sammy Watkins and returned it 41–yards for a touchdown during a 14–17 loss to the Buffalo Bills. In Week 16, Mathis set a season-high with six solo tackles and made two pass deflections during a 20–14 victory at the Chicago Bears. He started all 16 games and finished with 51 combined tackles (42 solo), nine pass deflections, and one interception.

==== 2015 ====
On March 19, 2015, the Detroit Lions re-signed Mathis to a two–year, $3.50 million contract that included a signing bonus of $750,000. The Lions acquired multiple cornerbacks to begin developing behind Mathis, selecting Alex Carter in the third round (80th overall) and Quandre Diggs in the sixth round (200th overall) of the 2015 NFL draft. They also signed veteran Josh Wilson during free agency. Mathis returned to training camp slated as the No. 2 starting cornerback under defensive coordinator Teryl Austin. He began the season as a starting cornerback alongside Darius Slay.

On September 13, 2015, Mathis started in the Lions' season-opener at the San Diego Chargers and set a season-high with nine combined tackles (eight solo) as they lost 28–33. On October 18, 2015, Mathis made one solo tackle, a pass deflection, and intercepted a pass Jay Cutler threw to wide receiver Alshon Jeffery during a 37–34 overtime victory at the Chicago Bears. In Week 8, Mathis made seven combined tackles (six solo) and one pass deflection during a 28–19 loss against the Minnesota Vikings in London, England. On November 14, 2015, the Detroit Lions officially placed Mathis on injured reserve after he was diagnosed with a concussion that he suffered against the Vikings. It was never specified when the concussion occurred during the game, but Mathis was evaluated upon his return with the team from London. He was evaluated by an independent neurologist and it was confirmed he had did sustain a concussion and was immediately placed in the league's concussion protocol. After three weeks, Mathis remained in concussion protocol and it was decided he would be placed on injured reserve effectively ending his season. He finished with 31 combined tackles (28 solo), four pass deflections, and one interception in seven games and seven starts.

On February 16, 2016, Mathis announced his retirement in an interview released on the Detroit Lions official website.

"(It's been) an awesome 13 years and I think it's time for me to hang up the cleats. The lord has blessed me with a long career...I think it's time. It's time for me to hang up the cleats My last three years in Detroit have been amazing for me. Being with (Jim) Caldwell these last two years, I couldn't ask for anything more."

— Rashean Mathis

On April 13, 2016, Mathis signed a one-day contract to retire as a member of the Jaguars.

== NFL career statistics ==
Legend
**Bold**	Career high

Year	Team	GP	COMB	TOTAL	AST	SACK	FF	FR	FR YDS	INT	IR YDS	AVG IR	LNG	TD	PD
2003	JAX	16	**81**	**71**	10	0.0	0	**1**	0	2	0	0	0	0	7
2004	JAX	16	63	53	10	0.0	1	0	0	5	42	8	21	0	**16**
2005	JAX	16	69	60	9	0.0	0	**1**	0	5	79	16	41	1	11
2006	JAX	16	63	56	7	0.0	0	0	0	**8**	146	18	55	0	12
2007	JAX	14	58	53	5	0.0	1	0	0	1	23	23	23	0	6
2008	JAX	12	40	39	1	**1.0**	1	**1**	0	4	**151**	38	**72**	**2**	9
2009	JAX	10	33	29	4	0.0	**2**	**1**	0	3	46	15	29	0	7
2010	JAX	16	57	46	**11**	0.0	1	0	0	1	24	24	24	0	6
2011	JAX	9	34	32	2	0.0	0	**1**	0	1	1	1	1	0	4
2012	JAX	12	20	20	0	0.0	0	0	0	0	0	0	0	0	5
2013	DET	15	47	44	3	0.0	0	0	0	0	0	0	0	0	15
2014	DET	16	51	42	9	0.0	1	0	0	1	41	**41**	41	1	9
2015	DET	7	31	28	3	0.0	1	0	0	1	0	0	0	0	4
Career		175	647	573	74	1.0	8	5	0	32	553	17	72	4	111

== In the media ==
In 2006, Mathis appeared as a celebrity contestant on Wheel of Fortune during NFL Players Week.
