= 2009 Jacksonville Jaguars season =

15th season in franchise history

- Owner: Wayne Weaver
- General manager: Gene Smith
- Head coach: Jack Del Rio
- Offensive coordinator: Dirk Koetter
- Defensive coordinator: Mel Tucker
- Home stadium: Jacksonville Municipal Stadium

Results
- Record: 7–9
- Division place: 4th AFC South
- Playoffs: Did not qualify
- Pro Bowlers: RB Maurice Jones-Drew; QB David Garrard

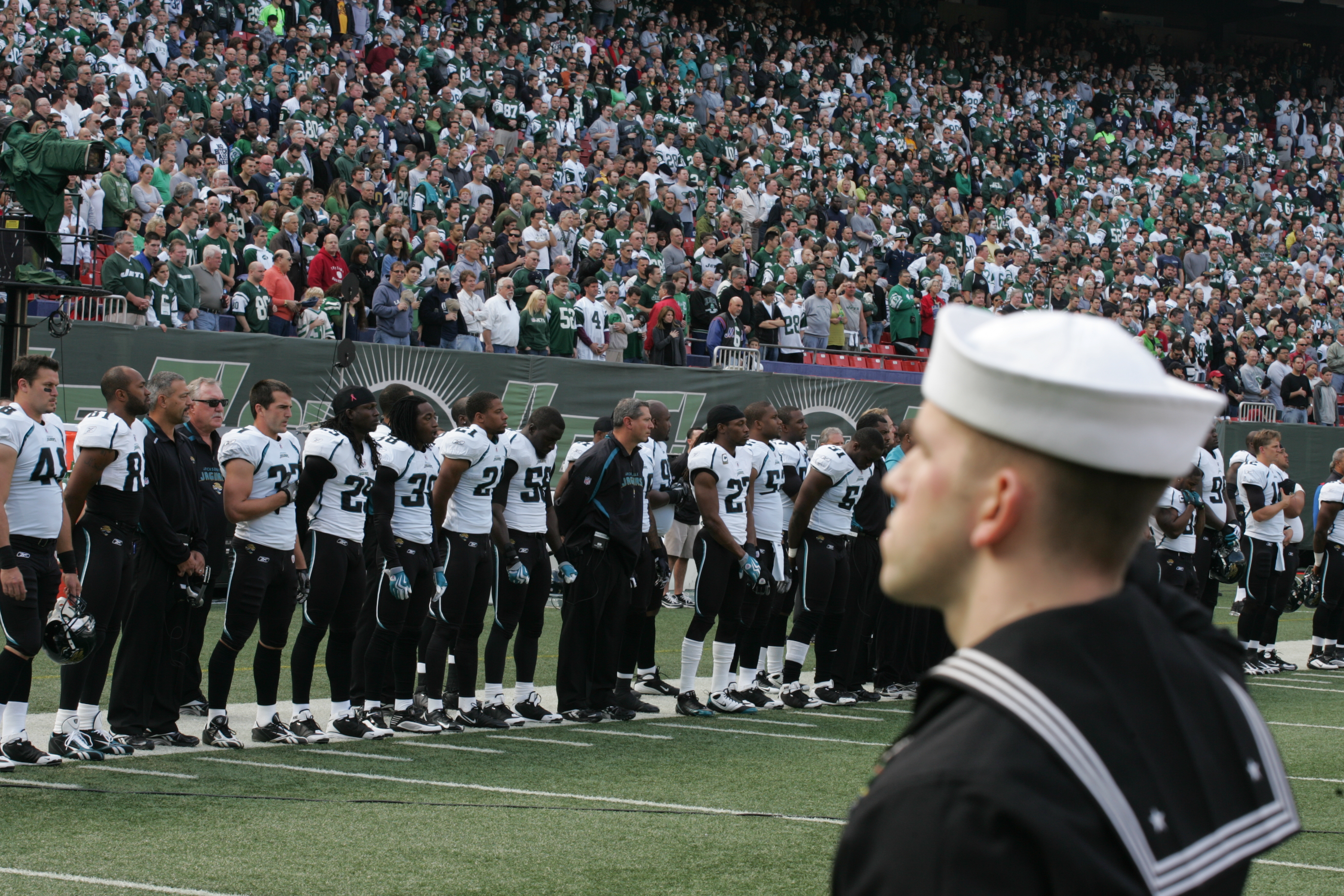
Jaguars players in a pregame military ceremony, November 15, 2009

The 2009 season was the Jacksonville Jaguars' 15th season in the National Football League (NFL) and the 7th under head coach Jack Del Rio. This was the first season for new general manager Gene Smith, who hoped to usher in a "rebuilding" era for the Jaguars franchise. Despite the Jaguars improvement on their 5–11 record in 2008 and starting the season with a 7–5 record, Jacksonville suffered a late-season collapse and would go on to lose their final four games, to finish the campaign at 7–9 and were eliminated from playoff contention for the second straight year.

The team unveiled a new uniform design for the 2009 season. Team owner Wayne Weaver reportedly wanted to "clean up" the look, feeling that the team had too many uniform styles.

== Offseason ==
=== NFL draft ===
2009 Jacksonville Jaguars draft
| Round | Pick | Player | Position | College | Notes |
| 1 | 8 | Eugene Monroe | Offensive tackle | Virginia | |
| 2 | 39 | Eben Britton | Offensive tackle | Arizona | |
| 3 | 72 | Terrance Knighton | Defensive tackle | Temple | |
| 3 | 73 | Derek Cox | Cornerback | William & Mary | |
| 4 | 107 | Mike Thomas | Wide receiver | Arizona | |
| 5 | 144 | Jarett Dillard | Wide receiver | Rice | |
| 6 | 180 | Zach Miller | Tight end | Nebraska–Omaha | |
| 7 | 250 | Rashad Jennings | Running back | Liberty | |
| 7 | 253 | Tiquan Underwood | Wide receiver | Rutgers | |
Made roster † Pro Football Hall of Fame * Made at least one Pro Bowl during career

=== Undrafted free agents ===
| Name | Position | College |
|---|---|---|
| Russell Allen | Linebacker | San Diego State |
| Todd Boeckman | Quarterback | Ohio State |
| Julius Williams | Defensive end | Connecticut |

== Staff ==
Jacksonville Jaguars 2009 staff
| Front office: Chairman/CEO – Wayne Weaver; Senior vice president of football operations/general counsel – Paul Vance; General manager/senior vice president of player personnel – Gene Smith; Director of football administration – Tim Walsh; Director of player personnel – Terry McDonough; Assistant director of pro personnel – Louis Clark; Assistant director of college personnel – Tim Mingey; Head coaches: Head coach – Jack Del Rio; Assistant head coach/tight ends – Mike Tice; Offensive coaches: Offensive coordinator – Dirk Koetter; Quarterbacks – Mike Shula; Running backs – Kennedy Polamalu; Wide receivers – Todd Monken; Offensive line – Andy Heck; Offensive quality control – Johnny Cox | Defensive coaches: Defensive coordinator – Mel Tucker; Defensive line – Ted Monachino; Linebackers – Mark Duffner; Assistant defensive backs – Thom Kaumeyer; Defensive assistant – Cory Undlin; Special teams coaches: Special teams coordinator – Russ Purnell; Assistant special teams – Nate Kaczor; Strength and conditioning: Strength and conditioning – Luke Richesson; Assistant strength and conditioning – Jason George |

== Final roster ==
2009 Jacksonville Jaguars roster
| Quarterbacks (QB): 9 David Garrard; 12 Luke McCown; Running backs (RB): 44 Brock Bolen FB; 23 Rashad Jennings; 32 Maurice Jones-Drew; 24 Montell Owens FB; Wide receivers (WR): 81 Torry Holt; 16 Nate Hughes; 11 Mike Sims-Walker; 80 Mike Thomas KR/PR; 19 Tiquan Underwood; 85 Ernest Wilford; Tight ends (TE): 89 Marcedes Lewis; 86 Zach Miller; 88 Zach Potter | Offensive linemen (OL): 78 Jordan Black T; 73 Eben Britton T; 65 Kynan Forney G; 67 Vince Manuwai G; 79 Paul McQuistan G/T; 63 Brad Meester C; 75 Eugene Monroe T; 64 Cecil Newton C; 77 Uche Nwaneri G; 72 Tra Thomas T; Defensive linemen (DL): 54 Quentin Groves DE; 55 Chris Harrington DE; 91 Derrick Harvey DE; 98 John Henderson DT; 96 Terrance Knighton DT; 94 Jeremy Navarre DE; 93 Greg Peterson DT; 95 Montavious Stanley DT; 90 Julius Williams DE | Linebackers (LB): 50 Russell Allen OLB; 57 Tank Daniels OLB; 56 Justin Durant MLB; 59 Brian Iwuh MLB; 52 Daryl Smith OLB; Defensive backs (DB): 42 Gerald Alexander SS; 41 Tyron Brackenridge CB; 26 Michael Coe CB/S; 37 Sean Considine SS; 21 Derek Cox CB; 30 Kennard Cox CB; 36 Courtney Greene SS; 27 Rashean Mathis CB; 29 William Middleton CB; 25 Reggie Nelson FS; 20 Anthony Smith FS; Special teams (ST): 48 Jeremy Cain LS; 3 Adam Podlesh P; 10 Josh Scobee K | Practice squad: 68 Rulon Davis DE; 13 Clarence Denmark WR; 58 Lamar Myles LB; 34 Allen Patrick RB; 70 Cameron Stephenson G; 83 Nate Swift WR; 35 Josh Vaughan RB; Reserve: 22 Don Carey CB (IR); 87 Jarett Dillard WR (IR); 99 Atiyyah Ellison DT (IR); 97 Reggie Hayward DE (IR); 51 Clint Ingram LB (IR); 33 Greg Jones FB (IR); 92 Rob Meier DT (IR); 53 Bryan Smith DE (IR); 31 Scott Starks CB (IR); 84 Troy Williamson WR (IR); Rookies in italics 53 active, 10 reserve, 7 practice squad |

== Local television blackouts ==
In 2009, the Jaguars had seven of their eight regular season home games blacked out on local TV. Due to an NFL rule, in order for a home game to be televised in a team's market, all non-premium tickets must be sold within 72 hours of kickoff. Many factors lead to a decrease in ticket sales for the Jaguars, including Jacksonville being a small market, a bad local economy, and low expectations for the team coming into the season. The Jaguars drew attendances under 50,000 in their first six home games. The only game that was televised in the Jacksonville market in 2009 was the final home game of the season when the Jaguars played the Indianapolis Colts on Thursday Night Football. Through the 2024 season, the Jaguars have not had any games blacked out since.

== Preseason ==
| Week | Date | Opponent | Result | Record | Venue |
|---|---|---|---|---|---|
| 1 | August 17 | at Miami Dolphins | L 9–12 | 0–1 | Land Shark Stadium |
| 2 | August 22 | Tampa Bay Buccaneers | L 23–24 | 0–2 | Jacksonville Municipal Stadium |
| 3 | August 27 | at Philadelphia Eagles | L 32–33 | 0–3 | Lincoln Financial Field |
| 4 | September 3 | Washington Redskins | W 24–17 | 1–3 | Jacksonville Municipal Stadium |

== Regular season ==
=== Schedule ===
| Week | Date | Opponent | Result | Record | Venue | Recap |
|---|---|---|---|---|---|---|
| 1 | September 13 | at **Indianapolis Colts** | **L** 12–14 | 0–1 | Lucas Oil Stadium | Recap |
| 2 | September 20 | Arizona Cardinals | **L** 17–31 | 0–2 | Jacksonville Municipal Stadium | Recap |
| 3 | September 27 | at **Houston Texans** | **W** 31–24 | 1–2 | Reliant Stadium | Recap |
| 4 | October 4 | **Tennessee Titans** | **W** 37–17 | 2–2 | Jacksonville Municipal Stadium | Recap |
| 5 | October 11 | at Seattle Seahawks | **L** 0–41 | 2–3 | Qwest Field | Recap |
| 6 | October 18 | St. Louis Rams | **W** 23–20 (OT) | 3–3 | Jacksonville Municipal Stadium | Recap |
| 7 | Bye | | | | | |
| 8 | November 1 | at **Tennessee Titans** | **L** 13–30 | 3–4 | LP Field | Recap |
| 9 | November 8 | Kansas City Chiefs | **W** 24–21 | 4–4 | Jacksonville Municipal Stadium | Recap |
| 10 | November 15 | at New York Jets | **W** 24–22 | 5–4 | Giants Stadium | Recap |
| 11 | November 22 | Buffalo Bills | **W** 18–15 | 6–4 | Jacksonville Municipal Stadium | Recap |
| 12 | November 29 | at San Francisco 49ers | **L** 3–20 | 6–5 | Candlestick Park | Recap |
| 13 | December 6 | **Houston Texans** | **W** 23–18 | 7–5 | Jacksonville Municipal Stadium | Recap |
| 14 | December 13 | Miami Dolphins | **L** 10–14 | 7–6 | Jacksonville Municipal Stadium | Recap |
| 15 | December 17 | **Indianapolis Colts** | **L** 31–35 | 7–7 | Jacksonville Municipal Stadium | Recap |
| 16 | December 27 | at New England Patriots | **L** 7–35 | 7–8 | Gillette Stadium | Recap |
| 17 | January 3 | at Cleveland Browns | **L** 17–23 | 7–9 | Cleveland Browns Stadium | Recap |

Note: Intra-division opponents are in bold text.

=== Game summaries ===
==== Week 1: at Indianapolis Colts ====
Week One: Jacksonville Jaguars at Indianapolis Colts – Game summary

| Quarter | 1 | 2 | 3 | 4 | Total |
|---|---|---|---|---|---|
| Jaguars | 0 | 6 | 0 | 6 | **12** |
| **Colts** | 0 | 7 | 7 | 0 | **14** |

at Lucas Oil Stadium, Indianapolis, Indiana

- Date: September 13, 2009
- Game time: 1:00 p.m. EDT
- Game weather: 74 °F (23 °C)
- Game attendance: 65,757
- Referee: Tony Corrente
- TV announcers (CBS): Kevin Harlan and Solomon Wilcots
- Recap, Game Book

Game information

**First quarter**

- No scoring plays.

**Second quarter**

- JAC – Josh Scobee 24-yard field goal, 8:58. Jaguars 3–0. **Drive: 11 plays, 59 yards, 4:55.**
- IND – Joseph Addai 3-yard run (Adam Vinatieri kick), 3:39. Colts 7–3. **Drive: 11 plays, 78 yards, 5:19.**
- JAC – Josh Scobee 46-yard field goal, 0:59. Colts 7–6. **Drive: 8 plays, 41 yards, 2:40.**

**Third quarter**

- IND – Reggie Wayne 35-yard pass from Peyton Manning (Adam Vinatieri kick), 6:56. Colts 14–6. **Drive: 10 plays, 86 yards, 5:34.**

**Fourth quarter**

- JAC – Maurice Jones-Drew 7-yard run (run failed), 11:07. Colts 14–12. **Drive: 11 plays, 58 yards, 5:30.**

**Top passers**

- JAC – David Garrard – 14/28, 122 yards
- IND – Peyton Manning – 28/38, 301 yards, TD, INT

**Top rushers**

- JAC – Maurice Jones-Drew – 21 rushes, 97 yards, TD
- IND – Joseph Addai – 17 rushes, 42 yards, TD

**Top receivers**

- JAC – Torry Holt – 3 receptions, 47 yards
- IND – Reggie Wayne – 10 receptions, 162 yards, TD

==== Week 2: vs. Arizona Cardinals ====
Week Two: Arizona Cardinals at Jacksonville Jaguars – Game summary

| Quarter | 1 | 2 | 3 | 4 | Total |
|---|---|---|---|---|---|
| **Cardinals** | 10 | 14 | 7 | 0 | **31** |
| Jaguars | 3 | 0 | 7 | 7 | **17** |

at Jacksonville Municipal Stadium, Jacksonville, Florida

- Date: September 20, 2009
- Game time: 1:00 p.m. EDT
- Game weather: 83 °F (28 °C)
- Game attendance: 46,520
- Referee: Gene Steratore
- TV announcers (Fox): Chris Myers and Trent Green
- Recap, Game Book

Game information

**First quarter**

- ARI – Tim Hightower 1-yard run (Neil Rackers kick), 8:07. Cardinals 7–0. **Drive: 11 plays, 75 yards, 6:53.**
- JAC – Josh Scobee 30-yard field goal, 4:41. Cardinals 7–3. **Drive: 7 plays, 62 yards, 3:26.**
- ARI – Neil Rackers 45-yard field goal, 0:03. Cardinals 10–3. **Drive: 8 plays, 53 yards, 4:38.**

**Second quarter**

- ARI – Josh Scobee 46-yard field goal blocked by Calais Campbell; returned 83 yards by Antrel Rolle (Neil Rackers kick), 11:30. Cardinals 17–3.
- ARI – Jason Wright 5-yard pass from Kurt Warner (Neil Rackers kick), 0:55. Cardinals 24–3. **Drive: 7 plays, 68 yards, 1:18.**

**Third quarter**

- ARI – Larry Fitzgerald 22-yard pass from Kurt Warner (Neil Rackers kick), 5:28. Cardinals 31–3. **Drive: 4 plays, 38 yards, 2:04.**
- JAC – Marcedes Lewis 25-yard pass from David Garrard (Josh Scobee kick), 1:31 Cardinals 31–10. **Drive: 8 plays, 64 yards, 3:57.**

**Fourth quarter**

- JAC – Mike Sims-Walker 19-yard pass from David Garrard (Josh Scobee kick), 7:11. Cardinals 31–17. **Drive: 14 plays, 85 yards, 5:09.**

**Top passers**

- ARI – Kurt Warner – 24/26, 243 yards, 2 TD
- JAC – David Garrard – 23/43, 282 yards, 2 TD, INT

**Top rushers**

- ARI – Tim Hightower – 15 rushes, 72 yards, TD
- JAC – Maurice Jones-Drew – 13 rushes, 66 yards

**Top receivers**

- ARI – Steve Breaston – 5 receptions, 83 yards
- JAC – Mike Sims-Walker – 6 receptions, 106 yards, TD

==== Week 3: at Houston Texans ====
Week Three: Jacksonville Jaguars at Houston Texans – Game summary

| Quarter | 1 | 2 | 3 | 4 | Total |
|---|---|---|---|---|---|
| **Jaguars** | 3 | 14 | 7 | 7 | **31** |
| Texans | 7 | 14 | 3 | 0 | **24** |

at Reliant Stadium, Houston, Texas

- Date: September 27, 2009
- Game time: 1:00 p.m. EDT
- Game weather: Sunny, 85 °F (29 °C)
- Game attendance: 70,083
- Referee: Ron Winter
- TV announcers (CBS): Bill Macatee and Steve Beuerlein
- Recap, Game Book

Game information

**First quarter**

- JAC – Josh Scobee 52-yard field goal, 7:35. Jaguars 3–0. **Drive: 8 plays, 59 yards, 3:17.**
- HOU – Jacoby Jones 18-yard pass from Matt Schaub (Kris Brown kick), 1:58. Texans 7–3. **Drive: 3 plays, 44 yards, 1:14.**

**Second quarter**

- JAC – David Garrard 2-yard run (Josh Scobee kick), 11:18. Jaguars 10–7. **Drive: 10 plays, 69 yards, 5:40.**
- HOU – Kevin Walter 9-yard pass from Matt Schaub (Kris Brown kick), 5:33. Texans 14–10. **Drive: 5 plays, 49 yards, 2:29.**
- JAC – Maurice Jones-Drew 61-yard run (Josh Scobee kick), 3:47. Jaguars 17–14. **Drive: 4 plays, 76 yards, 1:46.**
- HOU – Owen Daniels 2-yard pass from Matt Schaub (Kris Brown kick), 0:19. Texans 21–17. **Drive: 10 plays, 66 yards, 3:28.**

**Third quarter**

- JAC – Maurice Jones-Drew 1-yard run (Josh Scobee kick), 10:10. Jaguars 24–21. **Drive: 10 plays, 83 yards, 4:50.**
- HOU – Kris Brown 27-yard field goal, 4:02. Tied 24–24. **Drive: 11 plays, 74 yards, 6:08.**

**Fourth quarter**

- JAC – Maurice Jones-Drew 8-yard run (Josh Scobee kick), 14:15. Jaguars 31–24. **Drive: 10 plays, 87 yards, 4:47.**

**Top passers**

- JAC – David Garrard – 18/30, 214 yards
- HOU – Matt Schaub – 26/35, 300 yards, 3 TD, INT

**Top rushers**

- JAC – Maurice Jones-Drew – 23 rushes, 119 yards, 3 TD
- HOU – Steve Slaton – 12 rushes, 76 yards

**Top receivers**

- JAC – Mike Sims-Walker – 6 receptions, 81 yards
- HOU – Kevin Walter – 7 receptions, 96 yards, TD

==== Week 4: vs. Tennessee Titans ====
Week Four: Tennessee Titans at Jacksonville Jaguars – Game summary

| Quarter | 1 | 2 | 3 | 4 | Total |
|---|---|---|---|---|---|
| Titans | 0 | 3 | 6 | 8 | **17** |
| **Jaguars** | 10 | 17 | 3 | 7 | **37** |

at Jacksonville Municipal Stadium, Jacksonville, Florida

- Date: October 4, 2009
- Game time: 1:00 p.m. EDT
- Game weather: 79 °F (26 °C)
- Game attendance: 49,014
- Referee: Alberto Riveron
- TV announcers (CBS): Dick Enberg and Dan Fouts
- Recap, Game Book

Game information

**First quarter**

- JAC – Josh Scobee 22-yard field goal, 10:02. Jaguars 3–0. **Drive: 8 plays, 60 yards, 3:57.**
- JAC – Maurice Jones-Drew 9-yard run (Josh Scobee kick), 6:24. Jaguars 10–0. **Drive: 3 plays, 35 yards, 1:23.**

**Second quarter**

- TEN – Rob Bironas 29-yard field goal, 9:11. Jaguars 10–3. **Drive: 14 plays, 78 yards, 7:23.**
- JAC – Mike Sims-Walker 9-yard pass from David Garrard (Josh Scobee kick), 7:35. Jaguars 17–3. **Drive: 3 plays, 46 yards, 1:36.**
- JAC – Josh Scobee 50-yard field goal, 3:21. Jaguars 20–3. **10 plays, 44 yards, 3:08.**
- JAC – Mike Sims-Walker 15-yard pass from David Garrard (Josh Scobee kick), 0:27. Jaguars 27–3. **Drive: 6 plays, 41 yards, 2:08.**

**Third quarter**

- JAC – Josh Scobee 33-yard field goal, 10:05. Jaguars 30–3. **Drive: 10 plays, 51 yards, 4:55.**
- TEN – Nate Washington 14-yard pass from Kerry Collins (pass failed), 0:19. Jaguars 30–9. **Drive: 8 plays, 80 yards, 1:37.**

**Fourth quarter**

- TEN – Kerry Collins 10-yard run (Chris Johnson run), 5:28. Jaguars 30–17. **Drive: 11 plays, 77 yards, 3:27.**
- JAC – Marcedes Lewis 33-yard pass from David Garrard (Josh Scobee kick), 5:02. Jaguars 37–17. **Drive: 3 plays, 40 yards, 0:26.**

**Top passers**

- TEN – Kerry Collins – 29/48, 284 yards, TD, 2 INT
- JAC – David Garrard – 27/37, 323 yards, 3 TD

**Top rushers**

- TEN – Chris Johnson – 16 rushes, 83 yards
- JAC – Rashad Jennings – 9 rushes, 53 yards

**Top receivers**

- TEN – Kenny Britt – 7 receptions, 105 yards
- JAC – Mike Sims-Walker – 7 receptions, 91 yards, 2 TD

==== Week 5: at Seattle Seahawks ====
Week Five: Jacksonville Jaguars at Seattle Seahawks – Game summary

| Quarter | 1 | 2 | 3 | 4 | Total |
|---|---|---|---|---|---|
| Jaguars | 0 | 0 | 0 | 0 | **0** |
| **Seahawks** | 3 | 17 | 14 | 7 | **41** |

at Qwest Field, Seattle, Washington

- Date: October 11, 2009
- Game time: 1:15 p.m. PDT
- Game weather: Sunny, 55 °F (13 °C)
- Game attendance: 67,228
- Referee: Scott Green
- TV announcers (CBS): Kevin Harlan and Solomon Wilcots
- Recap, Game Book

Game information

**First quarter**

- SEA – Olindo Mare 47-yard field goal, 6:19. Seahawks 3–0. **Drive: 11 plays, 54 yards, 3:39.**

**Second quarter**

- SEA – Olindo Mare 27-yard field goal, 7:59. Seahawks 6–0. **Drive:11 plays, 48 yards, 5:08.**
- SEA – T. J. Houshmandzadeh 34-yard pass from Matt Hasselbeck (Olindo Mare kick), 4:43. Seahawks 13–0. **Drive: 4 plays, 48 yards, 1:32.**
- SEA – Nate Burleson 4-yard pass from Mat Hasselbeck (Olindo Mare kick), 2:08. Seahawks 20–0. **Drive: 3 plays, 61 yards, 0:58.**

**Third quarter**

- SEA – T. J. Houshmandzadeh 13-yard pass from Matt Hasselbeck (Olindo Mare kick), 10:08. Seahawks 27–0. **Drive: 4 plays, 32 yards, 1:12.**
- SEA – Nate Burleson 5-yard pass from Matt Hasselbeck (Olindo Mare kick), 5:54. Seahawks 34–0. **Drive: 8 plays, 48 yards, 3:04.**

**Fourth quarter**

- SEA – Nick Reed 79-yard fumble return (Olindo Mare kick), 14:01. Seahawks 41–0.

**Top passers**

- JAC – David Garrard – 18/31, 188 yards
- SEA – Matt Hasselbeck – 18/30, 241 yards, 4 TD

**Top rushers**

- JAC – Maurice Jones-Drew – 12 rushes, 34 yards
- SEA – Edgerrin James – 16 rushes, 46 yards

**Top receivers**

- JAC – Torry Holt – 7 receptions, 95 yards
- SEA – Nate Burleson – 6 receptions, 98 yards, 2 TD

==== Week 6: vs. St. Louis Rams ====
Week Six: St. Louis Rams at Jacksonville Jaguars – Game summary

| Quarter | 1 | 2 | 3 | 4 | OT | Total |
|---|---|---|---|---|---|---|
| Rams | 7 | 3 | 0 | 10 | 0 | **20** |
| **Jaguars** | 6 | 0 | 0 | 14 | 3 | **23** |

at Jacksonville Municipal Stadium, Jacksonville, Florida

- Date: October 18, 2009
- Game time: 1:00 p.m. EDT
- Game weather: 57 °F (14 °C)
- Game attendance: 42,088
- Referee: Jeff Triplette
- TV announcers (Fox): Ron Pitts and John Lynch
- Recap, Game Book

Game information

**First quarter**

- STL – Donnie Avery 17-yard pass from Marc Bulger (Josh Brown kick), 10:10. Rams 7–0. **Drive: 9 plays, 73 yards, 4:50.**
- JAC – Maurice Jones-Drew 4-yard run (kick failed), 7:43. Rams 7–6. **Drive: 5 plays, 58 yards, 2:27.**

**Second quarter**

- STL – Josh Brown 52-yard field goal, 0:37. Rams 10–6. **Drive: 4 plays, 51 yards, 6:24.**

**Third quarter**

- No scoring plays.

**Fourth quarter**

- JAC – Maurice Jones-Drew 1-yard run (Josh Scobee kick), 8:05. Jaguars 13–10. **Drive: 10 plays, 69 yards, 6:08.**
- STL – Leonard Little 26-yard interception return (Josh Brown kick), 4:36. Rams 17–13.
- JAC – Maurice Jones-Drew 3-yard run (Josh Scobee kick), 1:53. Jaguars 20–17. **Drive: 9 plays, 75 yards, 2:43.**
- STL – Josh Brown 27-yard field goal, 0:04. Tied 20–20. **Drive: 9 plays, 69 yards, 1:49.**

**Overtime**

- JAC – Josh Scobee 36-yard field goal, 8:00. Jaguars 23–20. **Drive: 13 plays, 62 yards, 7:00.**

**Top passers**

- STL – Marc Bulger – 22/34, 213 yards, TD, INT
- JAC – David Garrard – 30/43, 335 yards, 2 INT

**Top rushers**

- STL – Steven Jackson – 16 rushes, 50 yards
- JAC – Maurice Jones-Drew – 33 rushes, 133 yards, 3 TD

**Top receivers**

- STL – Steven Jackson – 6 receptions, 78 yards
- JAC – Mike Sims-Walker – 9 receptions, 120 yards

==== Week 8: at Tennessee Titans ====
Week Eight: Jacksonville Jaguars at Tennessee Titans – Game summary

| Quarter | 1 | 2 | 3 | 4 | Total |
|---|---|---|---|---|---|
| Jaguars | 0 | 7 | 6 | 0 | **13** |
| **Titans** | 3 | 10 | 10 | 7 | **30** |

at LP Field, Nashville, Tennessee

- Date: November 1, 2009
- Game time: 4:05 p.m. EST
- Game weather: Sunny, 59 °F (15 °C)
- Game attendance: 69,143
- Referee: Pete Morelli
- TV announcers (CBS): Gus Johnson and Steve Tasker
- Recap, Game Book

Game information

**First quarter**

- TEN – Rob Bironas 48-yard field goal, 7:46. Titans 3–0. **Drive: 13 plays, 50 yards, 7:14.**

**Second quarter**

- TEN – Nate Washington 6-yard pass from Vince Young (Rob Bironas kick), 9:19. Titans 10–0. **Drive: 8 plays, 54 yards, 4:31**
- TEN – Rob Bironas 25-yard field goal, 5:50. Titans 13–0. **Drive: 5 plays, 27 yards, 2:21.**
- JAC – Maurice Jones-Drew 80-yard run (Josh Scobee kick), 5:33. Titans 14–7. **Drive: 1 play, 80 yards, 0:17.**

**Third quarter**

- JAC – Maurice Jones-Drew 79-yard run (kick failed), 14:37. Tied 13–13. **Drive: 1 play, 79 yards, 0:23.**
- TEN – Chris Johnson 52-yard run (Rob Bironas kick), 11:00. Titans 20–13. **Drive: 7 plays, 74 yards, 3:37.**
- TEN – Rob Bironas 45-yard field goal, 5:00. Titans 23–13. **Drive: 7 plays, 40 yards, 3:45.**

**Fourth quarter**

- TEN – Chris Johnson 89-yard run (Rob Bironas kick), 14:46. Titans 30–13. **Drive: 3 plays, 95 yards, 1:13.**

**Top passers**

- JAC – David Garrard – 14/27, 139 yards, 2 INT
- TEN – Vince Young – 15/18, 125 yards, TD

**Top rushers**

- JAC – Maurice Jones-Drew – 8 rushes, 177 yards, 2 TD
- TEN – Chris Johnson – 24 rushes, 228 yards, 2 TD

**Top receivers**

- JAC – Mike Thomas – 4 receptions, 55 yards
- TEN – Justin Gage – 3 receptions, 41 yards

==== Week 9: vs. Kansas City Chiefs ====
Week Nine: Kansas City Chiefs at Jacksonville Jaguars – Game summary

| Quarter | 1 | 2 | 3 | 4 | Total |
|---|---|---|---|---|---|
| Chiefs | 3 | 3 | 0 | 15 | **21** |
| **Jaguars** | 7 | 7 | 3 | 7 | **24** |

at Jacksonville Municipal Stadium, Jacksonville, Florida

- Date: November 8, 2009
- Game time: 1:00 p.m. EST
- Game weather: Sunny, 75 °F (24 °C)
- Game attendance: 45,546
- Referee: Bill Leavy
- TV announcers (CBS): Bill Macatee and Steve Beuerlein
- Recap, Game Book

Game information

**First quarter**

- KC – Ryan Succop 45-yard field goal, 9:54. Chiefs 3–0. **Drive: 6 plays, 29 yards, 2:53.**
- JAC – Rashad Jennings 28-yard run (Josh Scobee kick), 4:33. Jaguars 7–3. **Drive: 9 plays, 79 yards, 5:31.**

**Second quarter**

- KC – Ryan Succop 21-yard field goal, 2:38. Jaguars 7–6. **Drive: 5 plays, 17 yards, 2:19.**
- JAC – Mike Sims-Walker 61-yard pass from David Garrard (Josh Scobee kick), 1:02. Jaguars 14–6. **Drive: 5 plays, 84 yards, 1:36.**

**Third quarter**

- JAC – Josh Scobee 27-yard field goal, 0:47. Jaguars 17–6. **Drive: 10 plays, 68 yards, 5:22.**

**Fourth quarter**

- JAC – Maurice Jones-Drew 10-yard run (Josh Scobee kick), 4:26. Jaguars 24–6. **Drive: 5 plays, 22 yards, 2:41.**
- KC – Chris Chambers 54-yard pass from Matt Cassel (Ryan Succop kick), 2:32. Jaguars 24–13. **Drive: 6 plays, 71 yards, 1:54.**
- KC – Chris Chambers 5-yard pass from Matt Cassel (pass succeeded), 1:01. Jaguars 24–21. **Drive: 8 plays, 68 yards, 1:31.**

**Top passers**

- KC – Matt Cassel – 23/39, 262 yards, 2 TD
- JAC – David Garrard – 18/27, 264 yards, TD

**Top rushers**

- KC – Jamaal Charles – 6 rushes, 36 yards
- JAC – Maurice Jones-Drew – 29 rushes, 97 yards, TD

**Top receivers**

- KC – Dwayne Bowe – 4 receptions, 74 yards
- JAC – Mike Sims-Walker – 6 receptions, 147 yards, TD

==== Week 10: at New York Jets ====
Week Ten: Jacksonville Jaguars at New York Jets – Game summary

| Quarter | 1 | 2 | 3 | 4 | Total |
|---|---|---|---|---|---|
| **Jaguars** | 7 | 14 | 0 | 3 | **24** |
| Jets | 10 | 3 | 0 | 9 | **22** |

at The Meadowlands, East Rutherford, New Jersey

- Date: November 15, 2009
- Game time: 1:00 p.m. EST
- Game weather: Cloudy, 62 °F (17 °C)
- Game attendance: 76,313
- Referee: Ed Hochuli
- TV announcers (CBS): Dick Enberg and Dan Fouts
- Recap, Game Book

Game information

**First quarter**

- JAC – Maurice Jones-Drew 33-yard run (Josh Scobee kick), 11:56. Jaguars 7–0. **Drive: 5 plays, 55 yards, 2:40.**
- NYJ – Jay Feely 32-yard field goal, 8:21. Jaguars 7–3. **Drive: 8 plays, 30 yards, 3:35.**
- NYJ – Jerricho Cotchery 7-yard pass from Mark Sanchez (Jay Feely kick), 1:08. Jets 10–7. **Drive: 5 plays, 61 yards, 1:57.**

**Second quarter**

- JAC – David Garrard 11-yard run (Josh Scobee kick), 10:52. Jaguars 14–10. **Drive: 11 plays, 70 yards, 5:16.**
- JAC – Mike Sims-Walker 26-yard pass from David Garrard (Josh Scobee kick), 2:44. Jaguars 21–10. **Drive: 10 plays, 86 yards, 5:14.**
- NYJ – Jay Feely 37-yard field goal, 0:36. Jaguars 21–13. **Drive: 7 plays, 53 yards, 2:08.**

**Third quarter**

- No scoring plays.

**Fourth quarter**

- NYJ – Jay Feely 40-yard field goal, 14:39. Jaguars 21–16. **Drive: 14 plays, 60 yards, 7:12.**
- NYJ – Thomas Jones 1-yard run (pass failed), 5:04. Jets 22–21. **Drive: 16 plays, 77 yards, 7:37.**
- JAC – Josh Scobee 21-yard field goal, 0:00. Jaguars 24–22. **Drive: 12 plays, 69 yards, 5:04.**

**Top passers**

- JAC – David Garrard – 16/26, 221 yards, TD
- NYJ – Mark Sanchez – 16/30, 212 yards, TD, 2 INT

**Top rushers**

- JAC – Maurice Jones-Drew – 24 rushes, 123 yards, TD
- NYJ – Thomas Jones – 21 rushes, 77 yards, TD

**Top receivers**

- JAC – Marcedes Lewis – 2 receptions, 58 yards
- NYJ – Braylon Edwards – 3 receptions, 79 yards

==== Week 11: vs. Buffalo Bills ====
Week Eleven: Buffalo Bills at Jacksonville Jaguars – Game summary

| Quarter | 1 | 2 | 3 | 4 | Total |
|---|---|---|---|---|---|
| Bills | 6 | 3 | 6 | 0 | **15** |
| **Jaguars** | 3 | 7 | 0 | 8 | **18** |

at Jacksonville Municipal Stadium, Jacksonville, Florida

- Date: November 22, 2009
- Game time: 1:00 p.m. EST
- Game weather: Light showers, 74 °F (23 °C)
- Game attendance: 47,757
- Referee: Mike Carey
- TV announcers (CBS): Bill Macatee and Steve Beuerlein
- Recap, Game Book

Game information

**First quarter**

- JAC – Josh Scobee 29-yard field goal, 10:40. Jaguars 3–0. **Drive: 7 plays, 17 yards, 3:24.**
- BUF – Rian Lindell 26-yard field goal, 4:36. Tied 3–3. **Drive: 11 plays, 72 yards, 6:04.**
- BUF – Rian Lindell 28-yard field goal, 1:59. Bills 6–3. **Drive: 5 plays, -1 yard, 2:16.**

**Second quarter**

- JAC – Maurice Jones-Drew 3-yard run (Josh Scobee kick), 9:30. Jaguars 10–6. **Drive: 12 plays, 78 yards, 7:29.**
- BUF – Rian Lindell 22-yard field goal, 0:00. Jaguars 10–9. **Drive: 9 plays, 76 yards, 1:58.**

**Third quarter**

- BUF – Terrell Owens 98-yard pass from Ryan Fitzpatrick (pass failed), 11:28. Bills 15–10. **Drive: 1 play, 98 yards, 0:12.**

**Fourth quarter**

- JAC – Mike Sims-Walker 3-yard pass from David Garrard (run succeeded), 0:56. Jaguars 18–15. **Drive: 12 plays, 68 yards, 5:16.**

**Top passers**

- BUF – Ryan Fitzpatrick – 18/31, 297 yards, TD, 2 INT
- JAC – David Garrard – 21/30, 215 yards, TD, INT

**Top rushers**

- BUF – Fred Jackson – 9 rushes, 35 yards
- JAC – Maurice Jones-Drew – 25 rushes, 66 yards, TD

**Top receivers**

- BUF – Terrell Owens – 9 receptions, 197 yards, TD
- JAC – Mike Sims-Walker – 8 receptions, 91 yards, TD

==== Week 12: at San Francisco 49ers ====
Week Twelve: Jacksonville Jaguars at San Francisco 49ers – Game summary

| Quarter | 1 | 2 | 3 | 4 | Total |
|---|---|---|---|---|---|
| Jaguars | 0 | 3 | 0 | 0 | **3** |
| **49ers** | 3 | 14 | 3 | 0 | **20** |

at Candlestick Park, San Francisco, California

- Date: November 29, 2009
- Game time: 4:05 p.m. EST
- Game weather: Sunny, 68 °F (20 °C)
- Game attendance: 69,732
- Referee: John Parry
- TV announcers (CBS): Kevin Harlan and Solomon Wilcots
- Recap, Game Book

Game information

**First quarter**

- SF – Joe Nedney 46-yard field goal, 10:03. 49ers 3–0. **Drive: 10 plays, 51 yards, 4:57.**

**Second quarter**

- SF – Vernon Davis 3-yard pass from Alex Smith (Joe Nedney kick), 8:58. 49ers 10–0. **Drive: 10 plays, 70 yards, 4:50.**
- SF – Frank Gore 4-yard pass from Alex Smith (Joe Nedney kick), 0:52. 49ers 17–0. **Drive: 9 plays, 59 yards, 3:06.**
- JAC – Josh Scobee 32-yard field goal, 0:00. 49ers 17–3. **Drive: 5 plays, 58 yards, 0:52.**

**Third quarter**

- SF – Joe Nedney 27-yard field goal, 7:29. 49ers 20–3. **Drive: 10 plays, 64 yards, 4:53.**

**Fourth quarter**

- No scoring plays.

**Top passers**

- JAC – David Garrard – 25/35, 307 yards
- SF – Alex Smith – 27/41, 232 yards, 2 TD

**Top rushers**

- JAC – Maurice Jones-Drew – 15 rushes, 75 yards
- SF – Frank Gore – 16 rushes, 33 yards

**Top receivers**

- JAC – Mike Thomas – 4 receptions, 62 yards
- SF – Vernon Davis – 6 receptions, 69 yards, TD

==== Week 13: vs. Houston Texans ====
Week Thirteen: Houston Texans at Jacksonville Jaguars – Game summary

| Quarter | 1 | 2 | 3 | 4 | Total |
|---|---|---|---|---|---|
| Texans | 0 | 7 | 5 | 6 | **18** |
| **Jaguars** | 3 | 17 | 3 | 0 | **23** |

at Jacksonville Municipal Stadium, Jacksonville, Florida

- Date: December 6, 2009
- Game time: 1:00 p.m. EST
- Game weather: 54 °F (12 °C)
- Game attendance: 42,709
- TV announcers (CBS): Gus Johnson and Steve Tasker
- Recap, Game Book

Game information

**First quarter**

- JAC – Josh Scobee 51-yard field goal, 10:44. Jaguars 3–0. **Drive: 8 plays, 48 yards, 4:16.**

**Second quarter**

- JAC – Nate Hughes 35-yard pass from David Garrard (Josh Scobee kick), 14:08. Jaguars 10–0. **Drive: 4 plays, 46 yards, 1:17.**
- JAC – Ernest Wilford 4-yard pass from David Garrard (Josh Scobee kick), 7:06. Jaguars 17–0. **Drive: 6 plays, 80 yards, 2:42.**
- HOU – Chris Brown 8-yard run (Kris Brown kick), 1:56. Jaguars 17–7. **Drive: 10 plays, 82 yards, 5:10.**
- JAC – Josh Scobee 46-yard field goal, 0:05. Jaguars 20–7. **Drive: 9 plays, 52 yards, 1:51.**

**Third quarter**

- HOU – David Garrard tackled in end zone by Zac Diles for a safety, 12:23. Jaguars 20–9.
- JAC – Josh Scobee 24-yard field goal, 4:33. Jaguars 23–9. **Drive: 12 plays, 34 yards, 5:44.**
- HOU – Kris Brown 32-yard field goal, 0:13. Jaguars 23–12. **Drive: 4 plays, 2 yards, 2:04.**

**Fourth quarter**

- HOU – Andre Johnson 1-yard pass from Matt Schaub (pass failed), 4:01. Jaguars 23–18. **Drive: 9 plays, 46 yards, 3:24.**

**Top passers**

- HOU – Matt Schaub – 19/27, 207 yards, TD, INT
- JAC – David Garrard – 15/28, 238 yards, 2 TD

**Top rushers**

- HOU – Ryan Moats – 12 rushes, 41 yards
- JAC – Maurice Jones-Drew – 24 rushes, 76 yards

**Top receivers**

- HOU – Andre Johnson – 7 receptions, 99 yards, TD
- JAC – Zach Miller – 3 receptions, 74 yards

==== Week 14: vs. Miami Dolphins ====
Week Fourteen: Miami Dolphins at Jacksonville Jaguars – Game summary

| Quarter | 1 | 2 | 3 | 4 | Total |
|---|---|---|---|---|---|
| **Dolphins** | 7 | 7 | 0 | 0 | **14** |
| Jaguars | 0 | 7 | 3 | 0 | **10** |

at Jacksonville Municipal Stadium, Jacksonville, Florida

- Date: December 13, 2009
- Game time: 1:00 p.m. EST
- Game weather: 75 °F (24 °C)
- Game attendance: 60,457
- Referee: Walt Coleman
- TV announcers (CBS): Kevin Harlan and Solomon Wilcots
- Recap, Game Book

Game information

**First quarter**

- MIA – Ricky Williams 1-yard run (Dan Carpenter kick), 2:33. Dolphins 7–0. **Drive: 13 plays, 67 yards, 6:47.**

**Second quarter**

- MIA – Chad Henne 1-yard run (Dan Carpenter kick), 8:33. Dolphins 14–0. **Drive: 13 plays, 74 yards, 7:22.**
- JAC – Maurice Jones-Drew 1-yard run (Josh Scobee kick), 2:32. Dolphins 14–7. **Drive: 12 plays, 74 yards, 6:01.**

**Third quarter**

- JAC – Josh Scobee 25-yard field goal, 4:55. Dolphins 14–10. **Drive: 7 plays, 63 yards, 2:56.**

**Fourth quarter**

- No scoring plays.

**Top passers**

- MIA – Chad Henne – 21/29, 220 yards, INT
- JAC – David Garrard – 11/26, 139 yards

**Top rushers**

- MIA – Ricky Williams – 28 rushes, 108 yards, TD
- JAC – Maurice Jones-Drew – 18 rushes, 59 yards, TD

**Top receivers**

- MIA – Greg Camarillo – 7 receptions, 110 yards
- JAC – Torry Holt – 2 receptions, 71 yards

==== Week 15: vs. Indianapolis Colts ====
Week Fifteen: Indianapolis Colts at Jacksonville Jaguars – Game summary

| Quarter | 1 | 2 | 3 | 4 | Total |
|---|---|---|---|---|---|
| **Colts** | 0 | 21 | 7 | 7 | **35** |
| Jaguars | 3 | 14 | 14 | 0 | **31** |

at Jacksonville Municipal Stadium, Jacksonville, Florida

- Date: December 17, 2009
- Game time: 8:20 PM EST
- Game weather: 56 °F (13 °C)
- Game attendance: 63,753
- Referee: Walt Anderson
- TV announcers (NFLN): Bob Papa and Matt Millen
- Recap, Game Book

Game information

**First quarter**

- JAC – Josh Scobee 50-yard field goal, 7:27. Jaguars 3–0. **Drive: 13 plays, 41 yards, 7:33.**

**Second quarter**

- IND – Dallas Clark 6-yard pass from Peyton Manning (Matt Stover kick), 14:13. Colts 7–3. **Drive: 14 plays, 80 yards, 8:14.**
- JAC – Maurice Jones-Drew 9-yard pass from David Garrard (Josh Scobee kick), 8:25. Jaguars 10–7. **Drive: 11 plays, 61 yards, 5:48.**
- IND – Chad Simpson 93-yard fumble return (Matt Stover kick), 8:12. Colts 14–10.
- JAC – Maurice Jones-Drew 3-yard run (Josh Scobee kick), 2:58. Jaguars 17–14. **Drive: 10 plays, 71 yards, 5:14.**
- IND – Austin Collie 23-yard pass from Peyton Manning (Matt Stover kick), 0:35. Colts 21–17. **Drive: 6 plays, 68 yards, 2:23.**

**Third quarter**

- JAC – Mike Sims-Walker 16-yard pass from David Garrard (Josh Scobee kick), 8:32. Jaguars 24–21. **Drive: 9 plays, 39 yards, 3:45.**
- IND – Dallas Clark 27-yard pass from Peyton Manning (Matt Stover kick), 5:28. Colts 28–24. **Drive: 7 plays, 80 yards, 3:04.**
- JAC – Mike Thomas 13-yard pass from David Garrard (Josh Scobee kick), 0:47. Jaguars 31–28. **Drive: 9 plays, 46 yards, 4:41.**

**Fourth quarter**

- IND – Reggie Wayne 65-yard pass from Peyton Manning (Matt Stover kick), 5:23. Colts 35–31. **Drive: 3 plays, 70 yards, 0:42.**

**Top passers**

- IND – Peyton Manning – 23/30, 308 yards, 4 TD, INT
- JAC – David Garrard – 23/40, 223 yards, 3 TD, INT

**Top rushers**

- IND – Joseph Addai – 16 rushes, 59 yards
- JAC – Maurice Jones-Drew – 27 rushes, 110 yards, TD

**Top receivers**

- IND – Reggie Wayne – 5 receptions, 132 yards, TD
- JAC – Mike Sims-Walker – 6 receptions, 64 yards, TD

==== Week 16: at New England Patriots ====
Week Sixteen: Jacksonville Jaguars at New England Patriots – Game summary

| Quarter | 1 | 2 | 3 | 4 | Total |
|---|---|---|---|---|---|
| Jaguars | 0 | 0 | 0 | 7 | **7** |
| **Patriots** | 7 | 21 | 0 | 7 | **35** |

at Gillette Stadium, Foxborough, Massachusetts

- Date: December 27, 2009
- Game time: 1:00 p.m. EST
- Game weather: Cloudy and mild, 55 °F (13 °C)
- Game attendance: 68,758
- Referee: Don Carey
- TV announcers (CBS): Kevin Harlan and Solomon Wilcots
- Recap, Game Book

Game information

**First quarter**

- NE – Randy Moss 2-yard pass from Tom Brady (Stephen Gostkowski kick), 2:48. Patriots 7–0. **Drive: 4 plays, 35 yards, 1:59.**

**Second quarter**

- NE – Chris Baker 26-yard pass from Tom Brady (Stephen Gostkowski kick), 14:54. Patriots 14–0. **Drive: 2 plays, 27 yards, 0:12.**
- NE – Sammy Morris 1-yard run (Stephen Gostkowski kick), 5:04. Patriots 21–0. **Drive: 6 plays, 75 yards, 3:03.**
- NE – Randy Moss 6-yard pass from Tom Brady (Stephen Gostkowski kick), 0:45. Patriots 28–0. **Drive: 7 plays, 67 yards, 2:06.**

**Third quarter**

- No scoring plays.

**Fourth quarter**

- NE – Randy Moss 17-yard pass from Tom Brady (Stephen Gostkowski kick), 14:54. Patriots 35–0. **Drive: 10 plays, 90 yards, 6:32.**
- JAC – David Garrard 2-yard run (Josh Scobee kick), 2:58. Patriots 35–7. **Drive: 5 plays, 70 yards, 2:13.**

**Top passers**

- JAC – David Garrard – 19/25, 185 yards, 2 INT
- NE – Tom Brady – 23/26, 267 yards, 4 TD

**Top rushers**

- JAC – Maurice Jones-Drew – 18 rushes, 63 yards
- NE – Sammy Morris – 12 rushes, 95 yards, TD

**Top receivers**

- JAC – Mike Thomas – 6 receptions, 57 yards
- NE – Wes Welker – 13 receptions, 138 yards

==== Week 17: at Cleveland Browns ====
Week Seventeen: Jacksonville Jaguars at Cleveland Browns – Game summary

| Quarter | 1 | 2 | 3 | 4 | Total |
|---|---|---|---|---|---|
| Jaguars | 3 | 0 | 0 | 14 | **17** |
| **Browns** | 3 | 10 | 7 | 3 | **23** |

at Cleveland Browns Stadium, Cleveland, Ohio

- Date: January 3, 2010
- Game time: 1:00 p.m. EST
- Game weather: Snow showers, 16 °F (−9 °C)
- Game attendance: 66,935
- Referee: Pete Morelli
- TV announcers (CBS): Gus Johnson & Steve Tasker
- Recap, Game Book

Game information

**First quarter**

- CLE – Phil Dawson 27-yard field goal, 10:57. Browns 3–0. **Drive: 9 plays, 44 yards, 4:03.**
- JAC – Josh Scobee 47-yard field goal, 2:20. Tied 3–3. **Drive: 6 plays, 12 yards, 3:00.**

**Second quarter**

- CLE – Joshua Cribbs 14-yard run (Phil Dawson kick), 3:51. Browns 10–3. **Drive: 7 plays, 57 yards, 3:22.**
- CLE – Phil Dawson 21-yard field goal, 1:44. Browns 13–3. **Drive: 6 plays, 31 yards, 1:51.**

**Third quarter**

- CLE – Jerome Harrison 6-yard run (Phil Dawson kick), 4:03. Browns 20–3. **Drive: 10 plays, 67 yards, 5:53.**

**Fourth quarter**

- JAC – Zach Miller 6-yard pass from David Garrard (Josh Scobee kick), 10:30. Browns 20–10. **Drive: 9 plays, 79 yards, 3:48.**
- CLE – Phil Dawson 33-yard field goal, 2:17. Browns 23–10. **Drive: 14 plays, 60 yards, 8:13.**
- JAC – Zach Miller 15-yard pass from David Garrard (Josh Scobee kick), 0:00. Browns 23–17. **Drive: 16 plays, 95 yards, 2:17.**

**Top passers**

- JAC – David Garrard – 22/39, 202 yards, 2 TD, INT
- CLE – Derek Anderson – 7/11, 86 yards, INT

**Top rushers**

- JAC – Maurice Jones-Drew – 16 rushes, 82 yards
- CLE – Jerome Harrison – 33 rushes, 127 yards, TD

**Top receivers**

- JAC – Zach Miller – 8 receptions, 69 yards, 2 TD
- CLE – Robert Royal – 2 receptions, 34 yards

=== Standings ===
==== Division ====
AFC South
| | W | L | T | PCT | DIV | CONF | PF | PA | STK |
|---|---|---|---|---|---|---|---|---|---|
| ^{(1)} Indianapolis Colts | 14 | 2 | 0 | .875 | 6–0 | 10–2 | 416 | 307 | L2 |
| Houston Texans | 9 | 7 | 0 | .563 | 1–5 | 6–6 | 388 | 333 | W4 |
| Tennessee Titans | 8 | 8 | 0 | .500 | 2–4 | 4–8 | 354 | 402 | W1 |
| Jacksonville Jaguars | 7 | 9 | 0 | .438 | 3–3 | 6–6 | 290 | 380 | L4 |

==== Conference ====
AFC
| # | Team | Division | W | L | T | PCT | DIV | CONF | SOS | SOV | STK |
|---|---|---|---|---|---|---|---|---|---|---|---|
**Division leaders**
| 1 | Indianapolis Colts | South | 14 | 2 | 0 | .875 | 6–0 | 10–2 | .473 | .470 | L2 |
| 2 | San Diego Chargers | West | 13 | 3 | 0 | .813 | 5–1 | 9–3 | .453 | .433 | W11 |
| 3 (Note: New England clinched the AFC No. 3 seed based on strength of victory.) | New England Patriots | East | 10 | 6 | 0 | .625 | 4–2 | 7–5 | .516 | .450 | L1 |
| 4 | Cincinnati Bengals | North | 10 | 6 | 0 | .625 | 6–0 | 7–5 | .492 | .438 | L1 |
**Wild Cards**
| 5 (Note: NY Jets clinched the AFC No. 5 seed based on better record in common games after Houston was eliminated from the three-way tiebreaker based on better conference record.) | New York Jets | East | 9 | 7 | 0 | .563 | 2–4 | 7–5 | .516 | .507 | W2 |
| 6 (Note: Baltimore finished in second place in the AFC North based on division record.) (Note: Baltimore clinched the AFC No. 6 seed based on conference record. Division tiebreaker was initially used to eliminate Pittsburgh (see below).) | Baltimore Ravens | North | 9 | 7 | 0 | .563 | 3–3 | 7–5 | .523 | .403 | W1 |
**Did not qualify for the postseason**
| 7 | Houston Texans | South | 9 | 7 | 0 | .563 | 1–5 | 6–6 | .504 | .417 | W4 |
| 8 (Note: Pittsburgh did not qualify as a Wild Card based on the first tiebreaking step for three or more clubs which reads, "Apply division tie breaker to eliminate all but the highest ranked club in each division prior to proceeding to Step 2".) | Pittsburgh Steelers | North | 9 | 7 | 0 | .563 | 2–4 | 6–6 | .488 | .521 | W3 |
| 9 (Note: Denver finished ahead of Tennessee based on a better conference record.) | Denver Broncos | West | 8 | 8 | 0 | .500 | 3–3 | 6–6 | .527 | .516 | L4 |
| 10 | Tennessee Titans | South | 8 | 8 | 0 | .500 | 2–4 | 4–8 | .539 | .414 | W1 |
| 11 (Note: Miami finished ahead of Jacksonville based on a head-to-head victory.) | Miami Dolphins | East | 7 | 9 | 0 | .438 | 4–2 | 5–7 | .559 | .464 | L3 |
| 12 | Jacksonville Jaguars | South | 7 | 9 | 0 | .438 | 3–3 | 6–6 | .496 | .411 | L4 |
| 13 | Buffalo Bills | East | 6 | 10 | 0 | .375 | 2–4 | 4–8 | .516 | .469 | W1 |
| 14 (Note: Cleveland finished ahead of Oakland based on a head-to-head victory.) | Cleveland Browns | North | 5 | 11 | 0 | .313 | 1–5 | 5–7 | .512 | .388 | W4 |
| 15 | Oakland Raiders | West | 5 | 11 | 0 | .313 | 2–4 | 4–8 | .527 | .525 | L2 |
| 16 | Kansas City Chiefs | West | 4 | 12 | 0 | .250 | 2–4 | 3–9 | .516 | .406 | W1 |
**Tiebreakers** (Note: When breaking ties for three or more teams under the NFL's rules, they are first broken within divisions, then comparing only the highest ranked remaining team from each division.)
