= List of Bethune–Cookman Wildcats in the NFL draft =

This is a list of Bethune–Cookman Wildcats football players in the NFL draft.

== Key ==
B	Back	K	Kicker	NT	Nose tackle
C	Center	LB	Linebacker	FB	Fullback
DB	Defensive back	P	Punter	HB	Halfback
DE	Defensive end	QB	Quarterback	WR	Wide receiver
DT	Defensive tackle	RB	Running back	G	Guard
E	End	T	Offensive tackle	TE	Tight end

= Pro Bowler
= Hall of Famer

== Selections ==
Year	Round	Pick	Overall	Player	Team	Position
1953	26	5	306	Jack McClairen	Pittsburgh Steelers	E
1963	14	10	192	Robert Dickerson	Pittsburgh Steelers	E
1968	16	8	416	Henry Still	Miami Dolphins	DT
1970	6	24	154	Alvin Wyatt	Oakland Raiders	DB
1972	6	8	138	Nathaniel Ross	Green Bay Packers	DB
1972	17	26	442	Alfonso Cain	Dallas Cowboys	DT
1973	12	16	302	Charles Clark	Cincinnati Bengals	RB
1976	5	13	137	Willie Lee	Kansas City Chiefs	DT
1976	10	20	285	Randy Walker	St. Louis Cardinals	RB
1976	15	6	409	Bernard Coleman	New England Patriots	WR
1976	15	18	421	Arnold Robinson	Buffalo Bills	LB
1977	4	10	94	Andre Samuels	Kansas City Chiefs	TE
1977	7	1	168	Charles White	New York Jets	RB
1977	12	14	321	Terry Anderson	Miami Dolphins	WR
1978	7	26	192	Earl Inmon	Oakland Raiders	LB
1980	7	25	190	Bennie Leverett	New York Jets	RB
1981	12	23	327	Stacy Charles	San Diego Chargers	WR
1982	2	5	32	Booker Reese	Tampa Bay Buccaneers	DE
1982	9	14	237	Charles Riggins	Green Bay Packers	DE
1984u	1	6	6	Lee Williams	San Diego Chargers	DE
1984u	2	25	53	Dewey Forte	Miami Dolphins	DE
1984	8	26	222	Mike Revell	Dallas Cowboys	RB
1985	6	9	149	John Bostic	Kansas City Chiefs	DB
1985	8	20	216	Leon Gonzalez	Dallas Cowboys	WR
1986	12	6	311	Sebastian Brown	New Orleans Saints	WR
1988	2	10	37	Terry Williams	New York Jets	DB
1989	4	6	90	Anthony Florence	Tampa Bay Buccaneers	DB
1995	7	40	248	Howard Smothers	Philadelphia Eagles	T
1997	6	27	190	Antwuan Wyatt	Philadelphia Eagles	WR
2003	2	7	39	Rashean Mathis	Jacksonville Jaguars	DB
2005	2	19	51	Nick Collins	Green Bay Packers	DB
