= Anthony Florence =

American football player (born 1966)

No. 25, 22
- Position: Cornerback

Personal information
- Born: December 11, 1966 (age 59); Delray Beach, Florida, U.S.
- Listed height: 6 ft 0 in (1.83 m)
- Listed weight: 185 lb (84 kg)

Career information
- High school: Atlantic (Delray Beach}
- College: Bethune-Cookman
- NFL draft: 1989: 4th round, 90th overall pick

Career history
- Tampa Bay Buccaneers (1989)*; Cleveland Browns (1990)*; Pittsburgh Steelers (1990)*; Cleveland Browns (1991); New Orleans Saints (1991–1992)*; Winnipeg Blue Bombers (1993)
- * Offseason or practice squad member only

Career NFL statistics
- Sacks: 0.5
- Stats at Pro Football Reference

Anthony Wesly Florence (born December 11, 1966) is an American former professional football player who was a defensive back in the National Football League (NFL) and Canadian Football League (CFL). He spent two seasons with the NFL's Tampa Bay Buccaneers, and another season with the Cleveland Browns.

Florence was selected in the fourth round of the 1989 NFL draft out of Bethune-Cookman, where he was teammates with Terry Williams. The pick was considered a “reach,” and Florence never played a down for the Buccaneers.

== See also ==
- List of Bethune-Cookman Wildcats in the NFL draft
