= Bishop Neumann Jr/Sr High School =

Private parochial coeducational school in Wahoo, Nebraska, United States

Location
- 202 South Linden; Wahoo, Nebraska; United States; 41°12′18″N 96°37′6″W

Information
- Type: Private, parochial, coeducational
- Religious affiliation: Roman Catholic
- Patron saint: St.John Neumann C.Ss.R
- Established: 1964
- Grades: 7–12
- Colors: Scarlet red and gold
- Team name: Cavaliers
- Accreditation: North Central Association of Colleges and Schools
- Website: www.bishopneumann.com

Bishop Neumann Jr./Sr. High School is a parochial Roman Catholic high school located in Wahoo, Nebraska, United States. It is located in the Roman Catholic Diocese of Lincoln.

It is a part of Saunders Catholic Schools.

== Athletics ==
Bishop Neumann is a member of the Nebraska School Activities Association. The school has won the following NSAA State Championships:

- Boys' American football - 1977, 2002, 2003, 2025
- Boys' Basketball - 1991, 2002, 2003, 2014, 2016, 2017
- Girls' Basketball - 2009, 2010, 2019
- Boys' Track and Field - 1995, 1996, 1997, 2015, 2016
- Boys' Cross Country - 1997, 1998
- Girls' Track and Field - 1987, 1988, 2008, 2023
- Girls' Cross Country - 1993, 1994, 1997, 2005
- Girls' Softball - 2017, 2021, 2024

The American football player Zach Miller, of the Chicago Bears, is a Bishop Neumann alumnus.
