= Zach Miller (tight end, born 1984) =

American football player (born 1984)

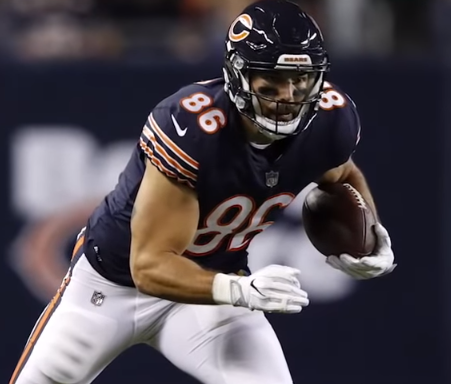
- Miller with the Chicago Bears in 2017

No. 86
- Position: Tight end

Personal information
- Born: October 4, 1984 (age 42); Weston, Nebraska, U.S.
- Listed height: 6 ft 5 in (1.96 m)
- Listed weight: 245 lb (111 kg)

Career information
- High school: Bishop Neumann (Wahoo, Nebraska)
- College: Nebraska–Omaha
- NFL draft: 2009: 6th round, 180th overall pick

Career history
- Jacksonville Jaguars (2009–2012); Tampa Bay Buccaneers (2013)*; Chicago Bears (2014–2018)
- * Offseason or practice squad member only

Career NFL statistics
- Receptions: 146
- Receiving yards: 1,631
- Receiving touchdowns: 15
- Stats at Pro Football Reference

Zachary Scott Miller (born October 4, 1984) is an American former professional football player who was a tight end in the National Football League (NFL). He played college football as a quarterback and tight end for the Nebraska–Omaha Mavericks.

He was selected by the Jacksonville Jaguars in the sixth round of the 2009 NFL draft. During his NFL career, Miller struggled with various injuries that prevented him from significant playing time. From 2009 to 2011 with the Jaguars, he started only five games with 33 appearances, followed by a brief stint with the Tampa Bay Buccaneers that also resulted in injury. He joined the Chicago Bears in 2014, where he was on injured reserve during his first season. In 2015, Miller enjoyed a breakout season as he appeared in 16 games and recorded five touchdowns, but had further season-ending injuries in subsequent years.

In a 2017 game against the New Orleans Saints, he suffered a complete knee dislocation while attempting to catch a potential touchdown pass. The injury was severe and threatened potential leg amputation, but successful surgeries saved the limb. He retired from football in April 2019 after missing the entire 2018 season.

== Early life ==
As a three-sport athlete at Bishop Neumann High School in Wahoo, Nebraska, Miller earned all-state honors as a senior and earned honorable mention all-state honors in basketball. He also won two state basketball championships with Bishop Neumann.

In football, Miller only played on the varsity team during his senior year, having broken his collarbone twice in his junior year. In 2002, Bishop Neumann won the Class C-1 state championship when they defeated Gothenburg High School 28–13 in the title game; after having −8 rushing yards in the first half, Miller recorded 149 rushing yards and two touchdowns to lead the Cavaliers to their first title since 1977. He ended the year with school records in passing (1,200) and rushing yards (980).

== College career ==
Miller initially attended the University of Nebraska–Lincoln, where he was a walk-on for the Nebraska Cornhuskers football team. After redshirting his freshman year, he decided to transfer to the University of Nebraska–Omaha in December 2004.

At Nebraska–Omaha, he joined the Division II Nebraska–Omaha Mavericks football team. During the 2005 season, he started as backup, and alternated at quarterback from mid-season on. He threw for 322 yards and one touchdown, and rushed for 141 yards on 29 carries, scoring three touchdowns.

In 2006, he was a regional finalist for the Harlon Hill Trophy. He was named NCC offensive player of the week three times. He rushed for 1098 yards and scored 19 touchdowns, being named the NCC Offensive MVP.

He finished his college career with 4,096 passing yards and 26 passing touchdowns, along with 3,122 career rushing yards and a school-record 50 touchdowns. He played tight end in the 2009 Division II All-Star Game, the Valero Cactus Bowl.

== Professional career ==
Pre-draft measurables
Height	Weight	40-yard dash	10-yard split	20-yard split	20-yard shuttle	Three-cone drill	Vertical jump	Broad jump
6 ft 3 3/4 in (1.92 m)	233 lb (106 kg)	4.53 s	1.55 s	2.62 s	4.22 s	7.06 s	37.5 in (0.95 m)	10 ft 4 in (3.15 m)
All values from Nebraska-Omaha Pro Day

=== Jacksonville Jaguars ===
Miller was selected in the sixth round (180th overall) of the 2009 NFL draft by the Jacksonville Jaguars. Afterwards, he was converted from quarterback to tight end. He was the first member of his team's draft class to sign a contract with the team, doing so on June 30.

In his first two seasons, he played in 29 games, but suffered a dislocated shoulder in 2011 that ruled him out for the year. The following year, he partially tore his Achilles tendon and calf muscle, and was placed on injured reserve on September 1. He was waived from injured reserve on October 16, 2012; he ended his Jacksonville stint with 33 games played and five starts.

=== Tampa Bay Buccaneers ===
On January 3, 2013, Miller signed with the Tampa Bay Buccaneers. After suffering a concussion in the preseason, he was released by the team on August 27.

=== Chicago Bears ===
On December 30, 2013, Miller was signed by the Chicago Bears to a reserve/future contract. During the 2014 preseason, he recorded two touchdowns against the Philadelphia Eagles before sustaining a Lisfranc injury to his left foot in the following game. He was placed on injured reserve.

Miller returned to the team for the 2015 season on a one-year extension. In Week 9, against the San Diego Chargers, Miller caught Jay Cutler's 25-yard pass with one hand to score the game-winning touchdown; it was Miller's first NFL touchdown since 2011. One week later, Miller caught five passes for 107 yards, including an 87-yard touchdown pass from Cutler, en route to a 37–13 win over the St. Louis Rams; the catch was the longest by a tight end since Byron Chamberlain's 88-yard play in 1999 and the longest touchdown reception by a Chicago Bear since Matt Forte's 89-yard rush in 2010. He ended the 2015 season with 34 receptions for 439 yards and a team-high five touchdowns. He also played in all 16 games and started a career-high 15 games; until 2015, he had started just five games since his career began in 2009, and had not appeared in a regular season game since 2011.

On March 14, 2016, Miller signed a two-year, $5.5 million contract extension with the Bears. He suffered a broken foot in Week 11 and was placed on injured reserve on November 23. At the time of his injury, Miller was leading the team in receptions (47) and touchdowns (four) with a career-best 486 receiving yards.

In the fourth game of 2017 against the Minnesota Vikings, Miller caught the first career touchdown pass of Bears second-overall draft pick Mitchell Trubisky. On the ensuing two-point conversion, the two were involved in a trick play to tie the game: Trubisky gave the ball to running back Jordan Howard on what appeared to be a draw play until Howard handed off to Miller, who was running in the opposite direction. Trubisky ran alongside Miller on a reverse option play, and when Miller was stopped by Anthony Barr, he pitched to Trubisky, who ran into the end zone unscathed. The following week against the Baltimore Ravens, Miller was the recipient of running back Tarik Cohen's 20-yard touchdown pass on another trick play.

==== Career-ending injury ====
On October 29, 2017, in the Bears' Week 8 game against the New Orleans Saints, Miller landed on his left knee while attempting to catch a touchdown pass, dislocating it. The score was initially ruled a touchdown before being overturned. He was taken to nearby University Medical Center New Orleans where further examination revealed he not only dislocated his left knee, but also tore his popliteal artery, a serious, career-threatening injury that raised the possibility of amputation. Miller underwent successful vascular surgery that day and remained hospitalized for three weeks.

The officials' decision to revert the score was controversial. Referee Carl Cheffers defended the call, explaining Miller needed "to survive the ground" as he landed with the ball. "He went to the ground, he temporarily lost control of the ball. The ball hit the ground; therefore it's incomplete." Although NFL Vice President of Officiating Alberto Riveron also supported the ruling, predecessors Mike Pereira and Dean Blandino argued otherwise; the latter commented, "At some point the process of the catch ends, and it ends when he rolls over on the ground with control. It was ruled a catch on the field. I didn't see anything definitive to overturn it and quite frankly, if it had been ruled incomplete on the field, if it had been me in the command center, I would have reversed it to a catch." In a May 2018 interview, Saints head coach Sean Payton, who visited Miller in the hospital, argued the play should have been a score. The NFL eventually modified catch rules for the 2018 season; under such rules, Miller's catch would have been ruled a touchdown.

The day after the game, Bears head coach John Fox announced he would send video of the play to the NFL. Miller was placed on injured reserve on November 7. He returned to Bears headquarters at Halas Hall in December.

Miller became a free agent after the 2017 season, but re-signed with the Bears on June 4, 2018, to a one-year deal. As part of the contract, he was guaranteed $458,000 for the 2018 season, and would receive $790,000 if he was able to play. However the next day, the Bears placed Miller on the reserve/PUP list, ending his 2018 season.

=== Retirement ===
On April 16, 2019, Miller announced his retirement from the NFL. He posted a statement on social media: "The time has come to move on from playing the game of football. It has been an incredible journey for myself and my entire family and we can’t thank you enough for your continued support. I would love nothing more than to step onto Soldier Field one last time, but physically I cannot give the game and our fans what they deserve. It’s difficult to find the words to express my love and gratitude to every single person that has cheered my name, lifted me up and stood strong with me throughout my career. I am forever grateful."

In four seasons with Chicago, he started 28 games and appeared in 33 as he recorded 101 receptions for 1,161 yards and 11 touchdowns. Nine days later, the Bears officially released him with a failed physical designation.

=== Career statistics ===
Year	Team	Games		Receiving				
Year	Team	G	GS	Rec	Yds	Avg	Lng	TD
2009	JAX	14	0	21	212	10.1	62	2
2010	JAX	15	5	20	216	10.8	52T	1
2011	JAX	4	0	4	42	10.5	14T	1
2015	CHI	15	14	34	439	12.9	87T	5
2016	CHI	10	8	47	486	10.3	34	4
2017	CHI	8	6	20	236	11.8	29	2
Career		66	33	146	1,631	11.2	87	15

== Personal life ==
Miller is married to his wife Kristen, together they have a daughter and two sons.

Following his retirement from football, Miller became a country music artist. He previously wrote songs for his family, and his interest in music grew while recovering from his leg injury. His debut single "How Ya Like Us Now", which was inspired by those from his hometown who were critical of his NFL aspirations, was released on May 28, 2021. A second song "I Was Hopin'" came out on August 27, 2021.
