= Nate Hughes =

American football player (born 1985)

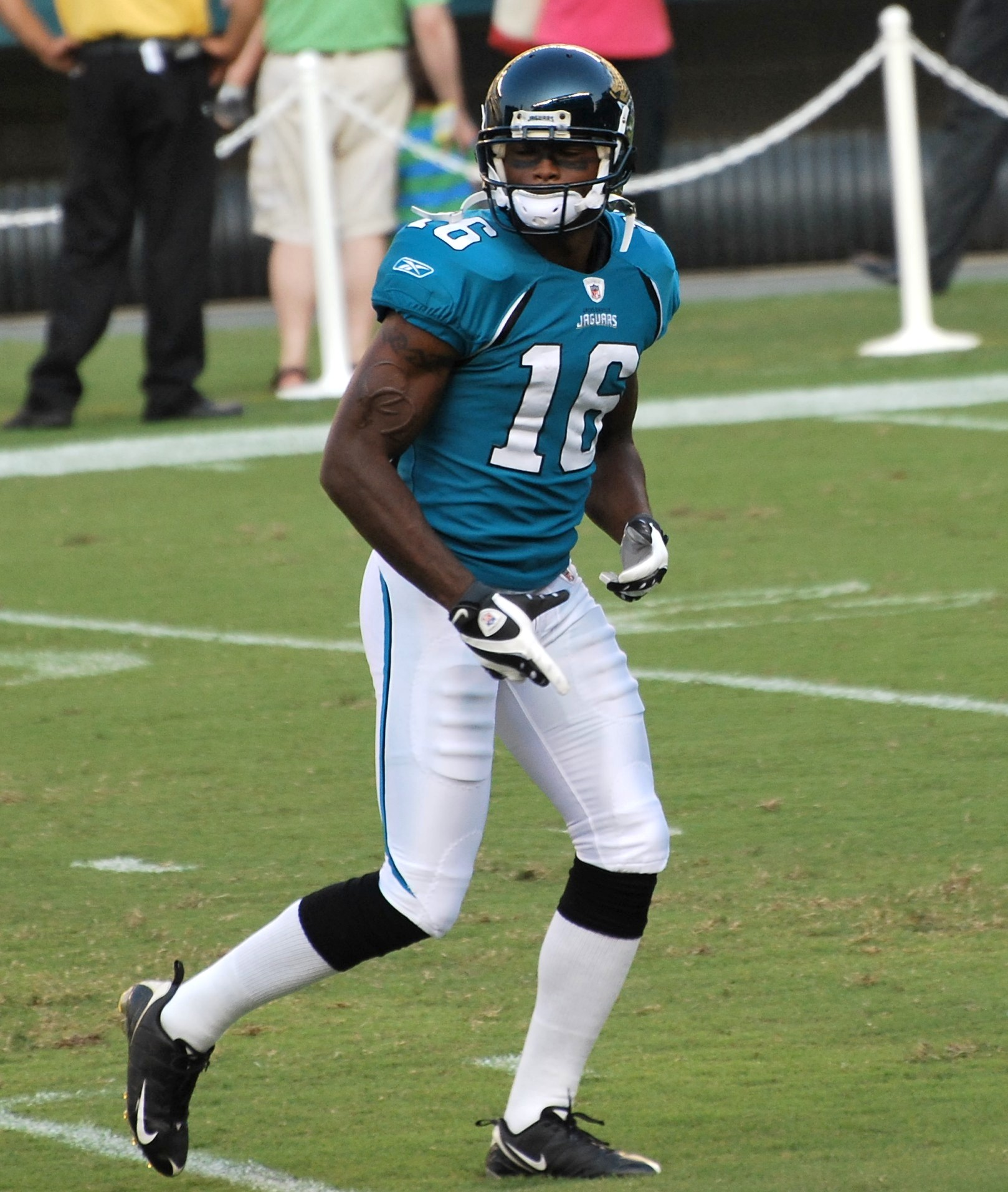
- Hughes in August 2009

No. 16
- Position: Wide receiver

Personal information
- Born: January 18, 1985 (age 41); Macon, Mississippi, U.S.
- Listed height: 6 ft 0 in (1.83 m)
- Listed weight: 186 lb (84 kg)

Career information
- High school: Starkville (MS)
- College: Alcorn State
- NFL draft: 2008: undrafted

Career history
- Cleveland Browns (2008)*; Kansas City Chiefs (2008)*; Jacksonville Jaguars (2008–2010); Detroit Lions (2011–2012)*
- * Offseason or practice squad member only

Awards and highlights
- Second-team All-SWAC (2004) Football; Verizon Junior All-American (2004) Track & Field; First-team All-SWAC (2006) Football; First-team NCAA FCS All-American (2006) Football; First-team All-SWAC (2007) Football

Career NFL statistics
- Games played: 8
- Receptions: 5
- Receiving yards: 70
- Receiving touchdowns: 1
- Stats at Pro Football Reference

Nathan Hughes (born January 18, 1985) is an American former professional football player who was a wide receiver in the National Football League (NFL). He played college football for the Alcorn State Braves and was signed by the Cleveland Browns as an undrafted free agent in 2008.

Hughes was also a member of the Detroit Lions, Kansas City Chiefs, and Jacksonville Jaguars.

== Early life ==
Hughes was born to Nathaniel and Gwendolyn Hughes in Macon, Mississippi. He has a sister Morgandy and a brother Charles. After high school he attended Alcorn State University, where he played football and graduated with a degree in nursing in 2008, before declaring for the NFL draft.

== College career ==
=== Football ===
Hughes was a four-year starter at Alcorn State University, catching 161 passes for 2,415 yards and 19 touchdowns, despite missing most of the 2005 season because of a shoulder injury. He also was a three-time Southwestern Athletic Conference decathlon champion, and a two-time champion in the 400-meter hurdles and the 110-meter hurdles.

Hughes saw immediate action his freshman season in 2003 catching 27 passes for 594 yards and four touchdowns. His best game that season was against Southern when he caught four passes for 158 yards and three touchdowns vs. Southeastern Louisiana.

In 2004, he took his game to another level reeling in 48 catches for 781 yards and four touchdowns. He finished 4th in the SWAC in receptions and 3rd in the SWAC in receiving yards to earn a spot on the All-SWAC 2nd Team Offense. His best game was vs. Southern where he caught nine passes for 131 yards. He also went 2-for-3 in passing yards for 111 yards and a touchdown.

After skipping the 2005 season due to an injury, Hughes returned to the field in 2006 and became more explosive during the season. Hughes led the team in receptions catching 40 passes for 471 yards and four touchdowns. Hughes was awarded the opportunity to return punts and kickoffs as well. He led the team in all-purpose yards returning 19 kickoffs for 406 yards and 22 punts for 460 yards and two touchdowns. He ranked 2nd in the FCS in punt returns averaging 20.9 yards per return. His best game that season was against Jackson State where he scored three total touchdowns and returned a 71-yard punt for a touchdown. As a punt returner he was named to the All-American Team as well as All-SWAC 1st Team.

In his final season as a Brave in 2007 he accumulated 1,606 all-purpose yards. He caught 46 passes for 569 yards and scored four touchdowns and returned one punt for a touchdown. His best game that season was vs. Jackson State where he caught six passes for 101 yards and scored two touchdowns. He was named to the All-SWAC 1st Team Offense as a wide receiver and returner.

Hughes is ranked 2nd all-time in school history in receptions (161) and 4th all-time in receiving yards (2,415). He also owns the record in career punt return average in a career (15.8) and best punt return average in a season (20.9).

=== Track & field ===
Hughes won six individual Southwestern Athletic Conference championships. He was a three-time Southwestern Athletic Conference decathlon champion (2005, 2007, 2008), and a two-time champion in the 400-meter hurdles (2007, 2008) and the 110-meter hurdles (2008).

As a freshman, Hughes competed in the 400m hurdles and decathlon. He finished 5th at the SWAC Outdoor Track & Field Championships in the 400m hurdles, and 3rd in the decathlon. Upon completion of the SWAC Outdoor Track & Field Championships, Hughes competed in the Junior USA Track & Field Championships. There he finished 5th and was named to the 2004 Verizon Junior All-American Team.

In 2005, Hughes would win his first SWAC Outdoor Track & Field Championship in the Decathlon. He placed 3rd in the same championship in the 400m hurdles.

Hughes missed the entire 2006 track and field season due to a shoulder injury, but returned in 2007 to win two individual conference championships. He won the decathlon and the 400m hurdles. Hughes placed 5th in the 110m hurdles. Hughes placed 5th in the NCAA Mid-Eastern Region Track & Field Championship.

Nate Hughes final season was his best season. Hughes would win the 110m hurdles, 400m hurdles, and decathlon at the SWAC Outdoor Track & Field Championships. He posted one of the fastest times in the nation in the 400m hurdles (49.73). Hughes placed 4th in the NCAA Mid-Eastern Region Track & Field Championship, but was unable to compete at the NCAA Track & Field Championship due to NFL mandatory mini-camp with the Cleveland Browns.

== Professional career ==
Pre-draft measurables
Height	Weight	40-yard dash	10-yard split	20-yard split	20-yard shuttle	Three-cone drill	Vertical jump	Broad jump	Bench press
6 ft 1 in (1.85 m)	184 lb (83 kg)	4.33 s	1.53 s	2.51 s	4.23 s	6.91 s	34 in (0.86 m)	9 ft 6 in (2.90 m)	17 reps

=== Cleveland Browns ===
Hughes was signed as an undrafted free-agent following the 2008 NFL Draft. He was later released within the same year.

=== Kansas City Chiefs ===
Hughes was signed, and was later released from the practice squad, by the Kansas City Chiefs during the 2008 season.

=== Jacksonville Jaguars ===
Hughes was signed by the Jacksonville Jaguars in November 2008 and although he won a roster spot during training camp, he was cut by the Jaguars on September 21, 2009. He was signed to the practice squad the next day and returned to active roster a few days later. On December 6, 2009 Hughes, playing in place of the injured Jarett Dillard, caught his first career touchdown pass. It came against the Houston Texans and was a 35-yard pass from quarterback David Garrard. It was his only reception in the game. He was waived/injured on August 8, 2010. He cleared waivers and was placed on injured reserve the following day.

After spending the 2010 season on injured reserve, Hughes was waived by Jacksonville on August 1, 2011.

=== Detroit Lions ===
On August 3, 2011 Hughes was claimed off waivers by the Detroit Lions.

On September 4, 2012 Hughes was waived by the Detroit Lions.

== Post-football career ==
After retiring from football, Hughes obtained his MD at the University of Mississippi Medical Center before completing an anesthesiology residency at Rutgers Robert Wood Johnson Medical School. Hughes also completed a cardiothoracic anesthesia fellowship at Emory University in Atlanta, GA. Hughes is currently working as an cardiothoracic anesthesiologist in Atlanta, GA. Prior to attending medical school, Hughes worked as a Registered Nurse.

== Personal life ==
Hughes met Angel Jean-Charles, a U.S. Coast Guard pilot, while he was playing for Jacksonville. The couple married in 2015. They had three children before divorcing in 2022.
