= Derek Cox =

American football player (born 1986)

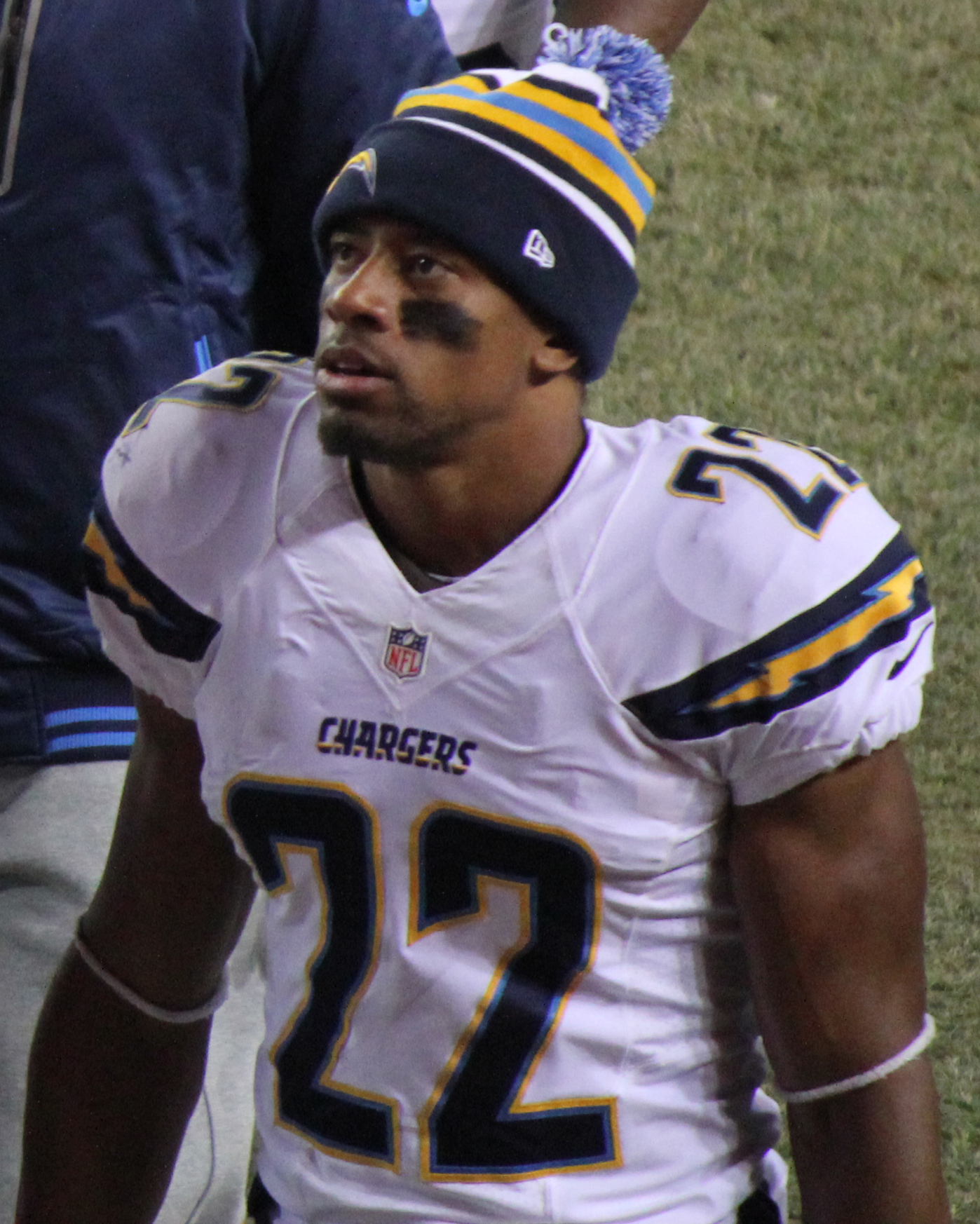
- Cox with the San Diego Chargers in 2013

No. 21, 22
- Position: Cornerback

Personal information
- Born: September 22, 1986 (age 40); Winterville, North Carolina, U.S.
- Listed height: 6 ft 1 in (1.85 m)
- Listed weight: 195 lb (88 kg)

Career information
- High school: J.H. Rose (Greenville, North Carolina)
- College: William & Mary
- NFL draft: 2009: 3rd round, 73rd overall pick

Career history
- Jacksonville Jaguars (2009–2012); San Diego Chargers (2013); Minnesota Vikings (2014)*; Baltimore Ravens (2014)*; New England Patriots (2015)*
- * Offseason or practice squad member only

Career NFL statistics
- Total tackles: 241
- Forced fumbles: 1
- Fumble recoveries: 1
- Pass deflections: 39
- Interceptions: 13
- Stats at Pro Football Reference

Derek Sinclair Cox (born September 22, 1986) is an American former professional football player who was a cornerback in the National Football League (NFL). He was selected by the Jacksonville Jaguars in the third round of the 2009 NFL draft. He played college football for the William & Mary Tribe.

Cox was also a member of the San Diego Chargers, Minnesota Vikings, Baltimore Ravens, and New England Patriots.

== Early life ==
Cox attended Junius H. Rose High School in Greenville, North Carolina. He played with Houston Texans running back Andre Brown.

== College career ==
Cox was a four-year starter for William & Mary. He was a two-time All-Colonial Athletic Association selection and finished his senior season tied for fifth in the CAA with four interceptions and returned a pair of those for touchdowns.

== Professional career ==
=== Jacksonville Jaguars ===
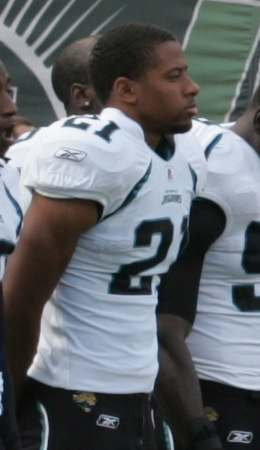
2009 with the Jacksonville Jaguars

Despite not being invited to the NFL Scouting Combine, Cox was selected by the Jaguars in the third round of the 2009 NFL draft with the 73rd overall pick.

In his first NFL game, Cox intercepted a Peyton Manning pass intended for Reggie Wayne and also recovered a fumble. Cox finished his rookie season with 58 tackles and 4 interceptions.

Cox missed the first two games of the 2012 season due to an injury and returned in Week 3 to face the Indianapolis Colts. Cox finished the 2012 campaign with a career best 60 tackles; he also had 1 FF and 4 interceptions.

=== San Diego Chargers ===
On March 13, 2013, Cox agreed to a four-year deal with the San Diego Chargers In week 6, Cox intercepted Andrew Luck to help win the game. Cox was benched three times during the regular season due to inconsistent play. He lost his starting job to veteran Richard Marshall in week 13. Cox finished the season on special teams and managed career-lows, 38 tackles and only 1 interception. He was released on March 4, 2014.

=== Minnesota Vikings ===
On March 13, 2014, Cox signed a one-year contract with the Minnesota Vikings. He was cut after the third preseason game, on August 25, 2014.

=== Baltimore Ravens ===
On August 27, 2014, Cox signed a one-year contract with the Baltimore Ravens. He was released three days later. Cox did not play in the 2014 season.

=== New England Patriots ===
On June 8, 2015, Cox was signed by the New England Patriots; the team released him on August 1, 2015.

=== NFL awards and honors ===
- Athlon Sports All-Rookie Team (2009)
- Ourlads Scouting All-Rookie Team (2009)
- 2010 Pro Bowl Alternate

== NFL career statistics ==
Legend
**Bold**	Career high

=== Regular season ===
Year	Team	Games		Tackles					Interceptions					Fumbles			
Year	Team	GP	GS	Cmb	Solo	Ast	Sck	TFL	Int	Yds	TD	Lng	PD	FF	FR	Yds	TD
2009	JAX	**16**	**16**	**72**	**58**	**14**	0.0	**1**	**4**	6	0	6	**11**	0	**1**	**5**	0
2010	JAX	13	11	49	41	8	0.0	**1**	**4**	14	0	14	8	0	0	0	0
2011	JAX	6	6	22	16	6	0.0	**1**	0	0	0	0	2	0	0	0	0
2012	JAX	12	12	60	55	5	0.0	**1**	**4**	**18**	0	**16**	**11**	**1**	0	0	0
2013	SDG	**16**	11	38	34	4	0.0	0	1	2	0	2	7	0	0	0	0
		63	56	241	204	37	0.0	4	13	40	0	16	39	1	1	5	0

=== Playoffs ===
Year	Team	Games		Tackles					Interceptions					Fumbles			
Year	Team	GP	GS	Cmb	Solo	Ast	Sck	TFL	Int	Yds	TD	Lng	PD	FF	FR	Yds	TD
2013	SDG	**2**	0	0	0	0	0.0	0	0	0	0	0	0	0	0	0	0
		2	0	0	0	0	0.0	0	0	0	0	0	0	0	0	0	0
