= Gene Smith (American football executive) =

American football executive (born 1963)

Personal information
- Born: December 31, 1963 (age 62); Willard, Ohio, U.S.

Career information
- College: Heidelberg

Career history

Coaching
- Ohio (1986–1988) Graduate assistant; Edinboro (1989–1994) Assistant coach; Jacksonville Jaguars (1994–1999) Scout

Operations
- Jacksonville Jaguars (2000–2007) Director of college scouting; Jacksonville Jaguars (2009–2012) General manager

Gene Smith (born December 31, 1963) is an American football executive who served as the general manager of the Jacksonville Jaguars of the National Football League (NFL) from 2009 to 2012.

== Early life and college ==
Smith was born in Willard, Ohio. He attended Heidelberg College, serving as a captain of the football team while playing as a defensive lineman.

From 1986 to 1988, Smith worked at Ohio University as a graduate assistant and later served as an assistant coach. He worked at Edinboro University from 1989 to 1994, serving as an assistant coach, recruiting coordinator, and strength and conditioning coordinator.

== NFL career ==
Smith joined the Jaguars in 1994 as a college scout. He was promoted to director of college scouting in 2000, and then took on the role of executive director of college and pro personnel in January 2008. He became the first general manager in Jaguars history on January 12, 2009, after the resignation of James "Shack" Harris, who had been the team's vice-president of player personnel.

Smith was fired on December 31, 2012. following a 2–14 season which was the worst record in team history, until they went 1–15 in 2020.
