= Terry Williams (defensive back) =

American football player (born 1965)

No. 33
- Position: Defensive back

Personal information
- Born: October 14, 1965 (age 61); Homestead, Florida, U.S.
- Listed height: 5 ft 11 in (1.80 m)
- Listed weight: 197 lb (89 kg)

Career information
- High school: South Dade (Homestead)
- College: Bethune–Cookman
- NFL draft: 1988: 2nd round, 37th overall pick

Career history
- New York Jets (1988–1990)
- Stats at Pro Football Reference

Terrance Williams (born October 14, 1965) is an American former professional football player who was a defensive back in the National Football League (NFL).

Williams was selected by the New York Jets in the 2nd round (37th overall) of the 1988 NFL draft, where he played for two years until a knee injury ended his playing career. He was released by the Jets in April 1991. His All-America talent on the track earned him a scholarship to play college football for the Bethune–Cookman Wildcats in 1984, where he played under then head coach Larry Little.

Williams currently resides in Daytona Beach, where he has served as the defensive backs coach at Bethune–Cookman University since 1999.
