= Colts–Jaguars rivalry =

National Football League rivalry

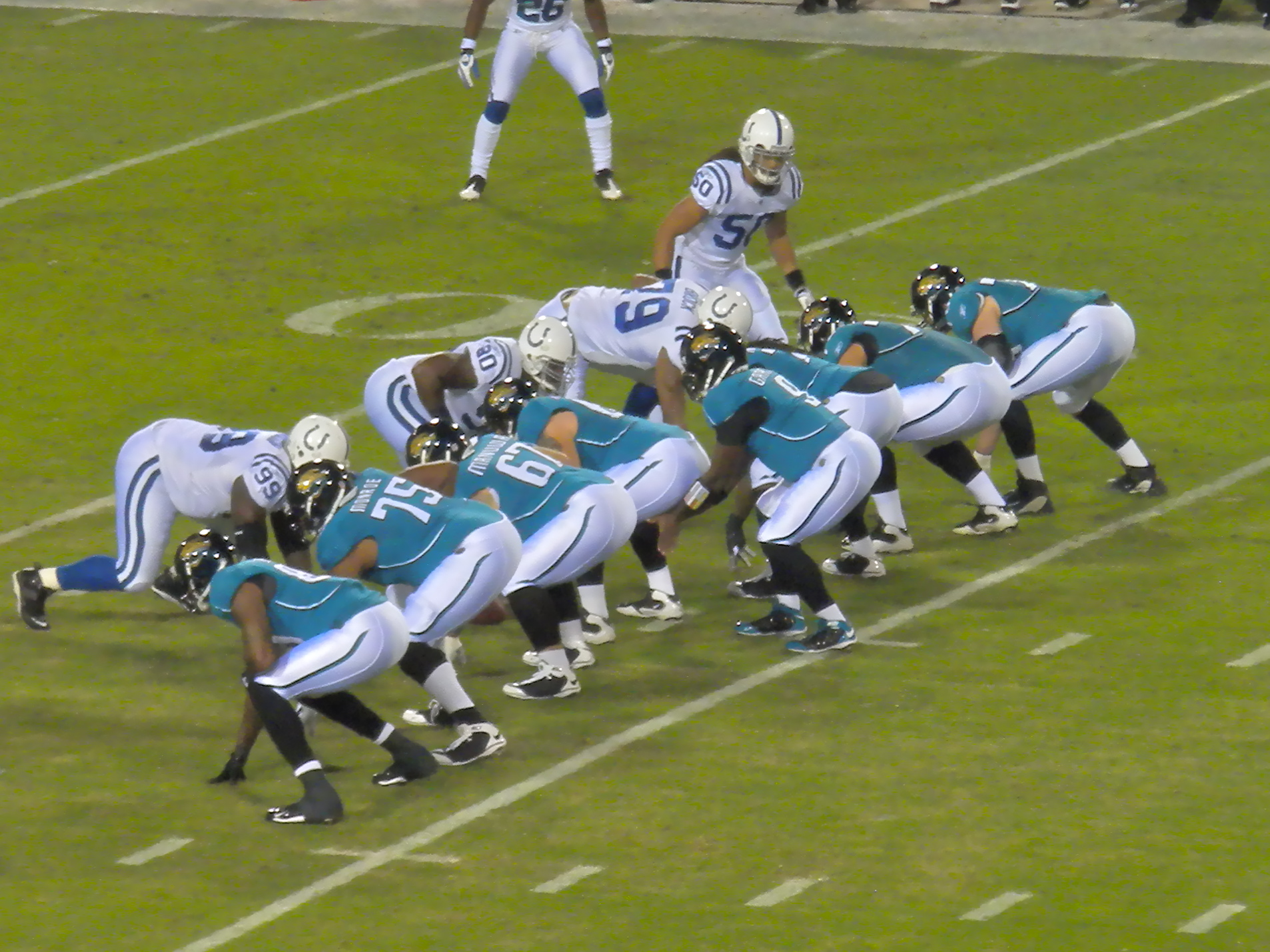
- Colts and Jaguars face off during the 2009 season.

- Indianapolis Colts Jacksonville Jaguars
- Location: Indianapolis, Jacksonville
- First meeting: December 10, 1995; Colts 41, Jaguars 31
- Latest meeting: November 1, 2026; Jaguars 42, Colts 7
- Next meeting: January 9/10, 2027
- Stadiums: Colts: Lucas Oil Stadium; Jaguars: EverBank Stadium

Statistics
- Total meetings: 51
- All-time series: Colts: 28–23
- Largest victory: Colts: 37–3 (2013); Jaguars: 51–16 (2015), 42–7 (2026)
- Most points scored: Colts: 44 (2014); Jaguars: 51 (2015)
- Longest win streak: Colts: 6 (2012–2015); Jaguars: 3 (2011–2012, 2023–2024, 2025–present)
- Current win streak: Jaguars: 3 (2025–present)
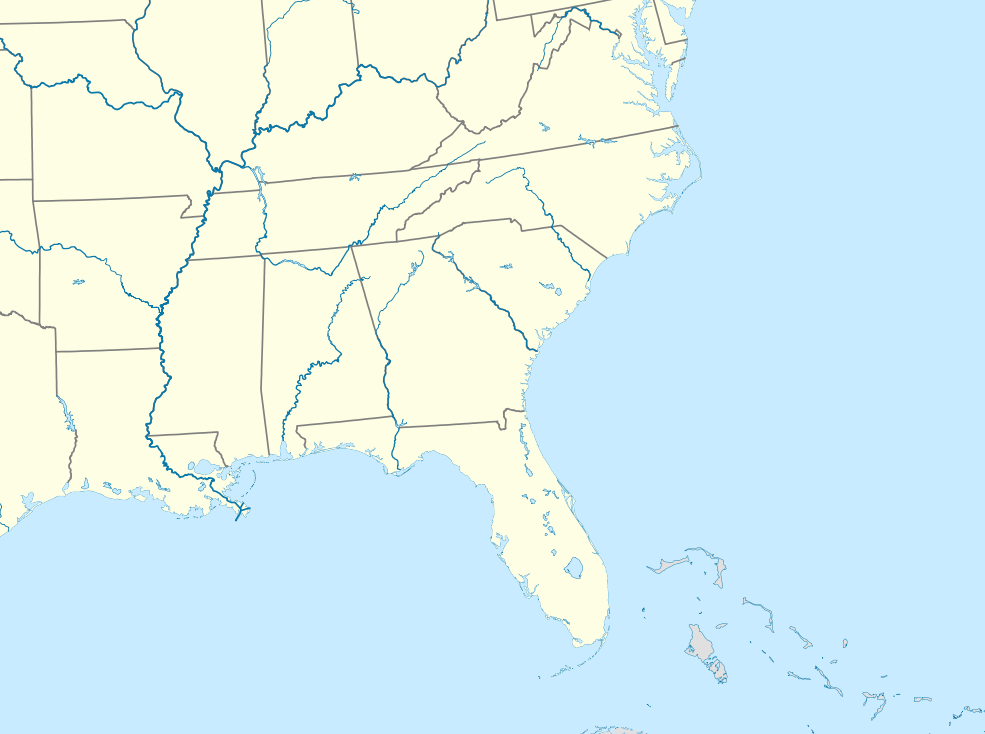

The Colts–Jaguars rivalry is a National Football League (NFL) rivalry between the Indianapolis Colts and Jacksonville Jaguars.

The Jaguars began their NFL journey in the 1995 season, but it was not until the 2002 season that the Colts and Jaguars officially became divisional rivals, following the establishment of the AFC South. While both teams competed for the AFC South during the late 2000s, the Colts largely controlled the rivalry, thanks to great quarterback play from Peyton Manning and Andrew Luck. Although the Jaguars have not consistently been as successful, they have managed to achieve some notable upset victories against the Colts, even when their teams were not highly competitive. In the 2020s, both franchises have rekindled their competitiveness.

The rivalry is characterized by the Jaguars ability to secure significant upsets against the dominant Colts, even though they do not consistently field competitive teams. Since the inception of the AFC South division in the 2002 season, the Jaguars have recorded more wins against the Colts than their counterparts, the Tennessee Titans and the Houston Texans. Furthermore, the Jaguars have established new franchise records in their matchups with the Colts, and both teams have played a role in thwarting each other's playoff aspirations. This rivalry is also notable for the Colts having not won in Jacksonville since 2014.

The Colts lead the overall series, 28–23. The two teams have not met in the playoffs.

== Background ==
=== Indianapolis Colts (1953–1994) ===
The Indianapolis Colts were established during the 1953 NFL season, originally located in Baltimore and known as the Baltimore Colts. Although the team experienced championship success, owner Robert Irsay threatened to move the franchise due to issues with their home venue, the Baltimore Memorial Stadium. Among the potential cities he evaluated for relocation, Jacksonville was one of them. On August 15, 1979, Irsay attended the Gater Bowl, where an enthusiastic crowd of 50,000 fans gathered to express their passion for an NFL team, waving banners and cheering in hopes of persuading him to move his team to Jacksonville. This event was famously referred to as "Colts Fever," with the stadium resonating with chants of "We want the Colts." Despite the overwhelming support, Irsay ultimately decided on Indianapolis as the new home for the team, which became known as the Indianapolis Colts in the 1984 season. Since their relocation, the team has struggled, making the playoffs only once in the 1987 season.

=== Jacksonville Jaguars ===
In 1991, Jacksonville made another attempt to secure an NFL franchise when the NFL revealed its intention to introduce two new expansion teams. The newly formed ownership group, Touchdown Jacksonville!, submitted a proposal to obtain a team for the city. Although they faced challenges and were not the frontrunners compared to other cities, the NFL ultimately voted to award Jacksonville an expansion team on November 30, 1993. Consequently, the Jacksonville Jaguars were established to compete in the NFL starting in the 1995 season, joining the AFC alongside the Indianapolis Colts. However, they joined the AFC Central, rather than the AFC East where the Colts where.

== 1995–2001: Pre-rivalry history ==
=== 1995: Inaugural meeting ===
In the 1995 season, the inaugural game between the Colts and Jaguars took place on December 10 in Jacksonville. The 3–10 Jaguars struggled against the 7–6 Colts, as issues with their special teams resulted in 14 Colts points, creating a deficit they were unable to overcome. This ultimately culminated in a 41–31 Colts victory in their inaugural matchup. This victory helped the Colts to secure a playoff berth for the first time since their 1987 season.

=== 1996–1999: Playoffs ===
From 1996 to 1999, the two teams did not face each other in the regular season. However, they both qualified for the playoffs in the same season twice in 1996 and 1999.

During the 1996 season playoffs, the Colts were defeated by the Pittsburgh Steelers, whereas the Jaguars unexpectedly advanced to the AFC Championship by overcoming the Buffalo Bills and the Denver Broncos, only to fall to the New England Patriots.

During the 1999 season playoffs, the Jaguars and Colts secured the 1st and 2nd seeds in the AFC, respectively. The Jaguars defeated the Miami Dolphins, but both teams ultimately fell to the Tennessee Titans.

=== 2000: Final matchup before becoming divisional rivals ===
In the 2000 season on September 25, the Colts and Jaguars faced off for the first time in Indianapolis. The Jaguars arrived at the game having the 7th-ranked defense and fresh off their first shutout in franchise history against the Cincinnati Bengals. However, future hall–of–famer QB Peyton Manning, drafted first overall by the Colts in the 1998 NFL draft, had one of his best performances yet. He threw for 440 yards and four touchdowns, leading the Colts to a dominant 43–14 win.

== 2002–2011: The start of a new divisional rival and Peyton Manning dominance ==
=== AFC South formation ===
Following the NFL's approval for the creation of the Houston Texans, the league opted to reorganize into eight divisions: four teams in each division and four divisions in each conference, effective in the 2002 season. In the newly established AFC South division, the NFL incorporated the following teams: the newly formed Houston Texans, the Jacksonville Jaguars and Tennessee Titans from the AFC Central, and the Indianapolis Colts from the AFC East. Initially, the NFL offered Wayne Huizenga, owner of the Dolphins, the opportunity to move to the more geographically suitable AFC South over the Colts, potentially fostering an in-state rivalry with the Jaguars. However, Huizenga chose to maintain the traditional AFL rivalries within the AFC East. Consequently, the Colts and Jaguars became divisional rivals, meeting twice annually – once in Indianapolis and once in Jacksonville.

=== 2002: Inaugural matchups as divisional rivals ===
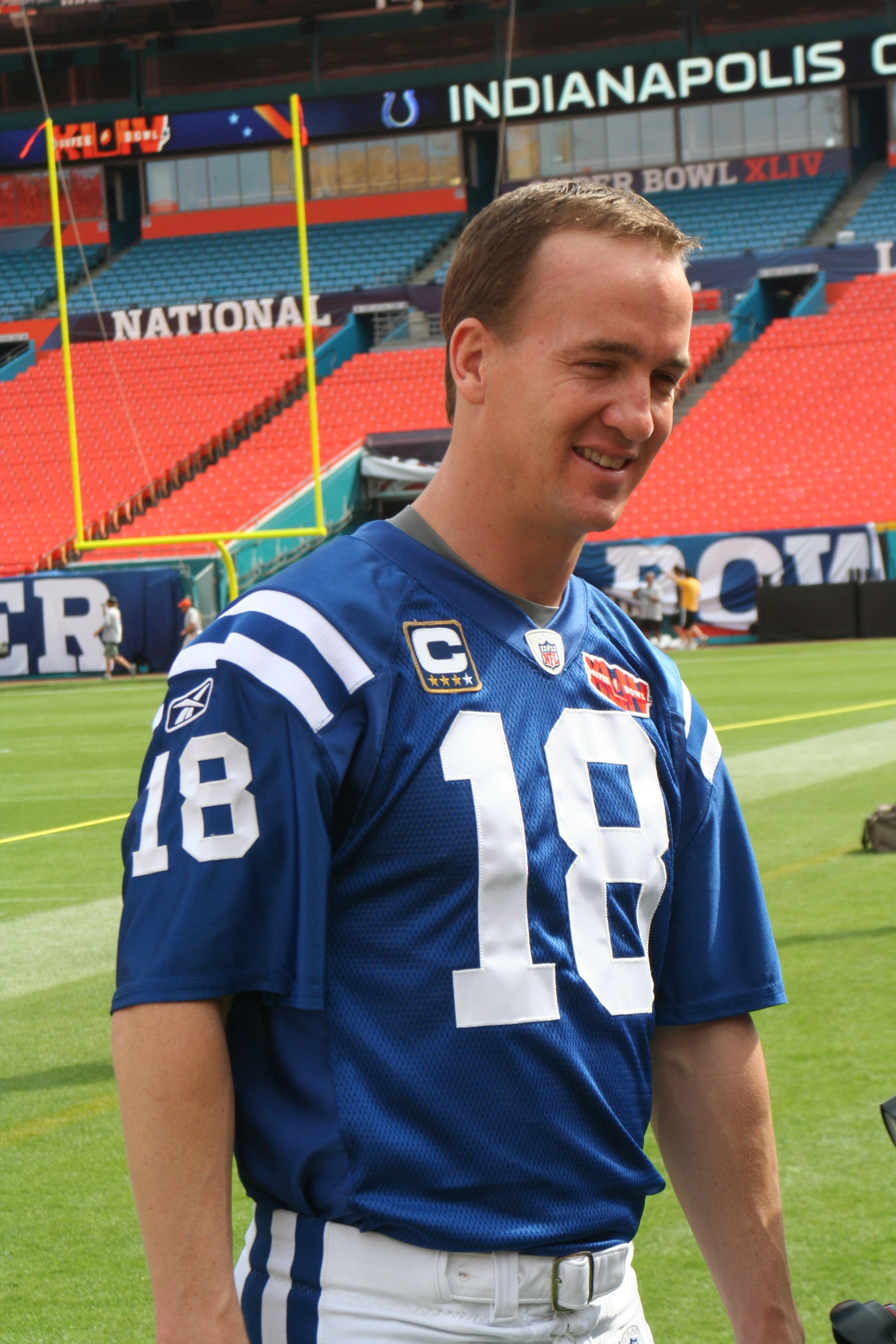
Although the Jaguars defense occasionally posed challenges, Hall of Famer quarterback Peyton Manning consistently excelled against them, achieving a 14–5 record as a Colts player and significantly contributing to the Colts success throughout the 2000s.

In the 2002 season, the Colts and Jaguars faced off for the first time as divisional rivals in their season opener on September 8 in Jacksonville. The Colts initiated the scoring with a touchdown in the first quarter. The Jaguars tied it in the second quarter. In the final minutes of the second quarter, Mark Brunell threw a 40–yard pick–six to LB Marcus Washington. The Jaguars then missed a 52–yard field goal attempt, resulting in a halftime score of 14–7 in favor of the Colts. In the third quarter, a fumble by Colts RB Edgerrin James led to a Jaguars' field goal, followed by another fumble from Colts TE Marcus Pollard that led to a Jaguars touchdown, giving them the lead. However, after the Jaguars forced a Colts three–and–out, return specialist Damon Gibson mishandled the catch, allowing Colts DB Clifton Crosby to recover the ball at Jacksonville's 19–yard line. The Colts capitalized on this opportunity, scoring a touchdown to regain the lead. In the fourth quarter, the Colts added another touchdown to widen their advantage. The Jaguars mounted a lengthy drive, scoring a touchdown and converting a two-point attempt to narrow the Colts' lead. The Colts effectively managed the Jaguars' timeouts, leaving them with the ball and about a minute remaining. The Jaguars advanced to the Colts' 46–yard line but ultimately ran out of time, resulting in a 28–25 victory for the Colts.

The two teams faced off in the season finale on December 30 in Indianapolis. Although the Colts had lost the inaugural AFC South title to the Titans the week prior, they still have the opportunity to secure a playoff berth with a victory against the eliminated Jaguars. The Jaguars had a 13–10 lead heading into the fourth quarter. On the subsequent drive, the Jaguars appeared to force a three–and–out, but a penalty for running into the kicker granted the Colts a fresh set of downs. Capitalizing on this opportunity, the Colts tied the game with a field goal. After forcing another three–and–out, a strong punt return positioned the Colts at Jacksonville's 47–yard line. Manning then connected with Pollard for an 11–yard touchdown, putting the Colts ahead. In the closing moments, the Colts' defense held firm, securing a 20–13 victory over the Jaguars, completing a sweep in their initial matchups as divisional rivals and earning a wild card spot in the playoffs.

=== 2003–2004: Jaguars' first wins over the Colts ===
In the 2003 season, the Colts secured a 23–13 victory over the Jaguars on September 21 in Indianapolis, marking their fifth consecutive win against their rival. A standout moment from the game occurred when Colts' rookie DB Mike Doss caused Jaguars' RB Fred Taylor to fumble the ball. Doss reportedly quipped, "Hey, Fred, you forgot something." In retaliation, Taylor told reporters ahead of their next encounter, "I'm going to bust his (butt). I'm going to punish him."

The two teams faced off again on November 9 in Jacksonville, with the Colts holding a 7–1 record and the Jaguars at 1–7. As the fourth quarter commenced, the Jaguars, trailing by 13 points, mounted a comeback to take the lead. The Colts briefly regained the lead with a field goal. However, Fred Taylor fulfilled his promise with a 32–yard run, evading Mike Doss as he fell, and reached the end zone, putting the Jaguars ahead with just one minute left in the game. The Jaguars then intercepted Manning, securing a 28–23 victory over the Colts in a stunning upset and recording their first win over the Colts. Taylor concluded the game with 152 rushing yards on 28 carries. After the game, Doss remarked, "I guess you'd have to say he got the final word today."

In the 2004 season, The Colts and Jaguars faced off on October 24 in Indianapolis. The Colts were favored by 9 points against the Jaguars as they entered the game, having already won in their earlier matchup on October 3 in Jacksonville. The game was fiercely competitive, highlighted by Jaguars QB Byron Leftwich having one of his best games, throwing for 300 yards and two touchdowns. In the final minutes, after the Colts managed to tie the game, Leftwich guided the Jaguars into Colts territory, culminating in rookie K Josh Scobee successfully making a game-winning 53–yard field goal, upsetting the Colts in a 27-24 Jaguars victory and recording their first win in Indianapolis. This would ultimately be the Colts' only loss at the RCA Dome that season.

The Colts embarked on a winning streak that ultimately secured them the AFC South title, and were locked in the 3rd seed after a 34–31 overtime victory over the San Diego Chargers as they entered the final week. In contrast, the Jaguars were still in the hunt for a playoff berth. For the Jaguars to secure the last playoff position, they not only needed to win their game against the Oakland Raiders but also required the Colts to beat the Broncos and the Steelers to beat the Bills. If all conditions were met, the Jaguars would head to Indianapolis for their first playoff matchup against the Colts. The Jaguars defeated the Raiders, and the Steelers defeated the Bills. However, the Colts opted to rest their starters, ultimately losing 33–14. This outcome allowed the Broncos to clinch the final 6th seed, resulting in the elimination of the Jaguars. After the game, Jaguars players suggested that the Colts were apprehensive about facing Jacksonville and deliberately lost to the Broncos, with LB Mike Peterson stating, “They didn’t want to play us.” Subsequently, the Colts defeated the Broncos 49–24 in the wild-card round.

=== 2005–2007: Battle for the AFC South title ===
In the 2005 season, the Jaguars' defense limited Peyton Manning to one of his worst performances in his career on September 18 in Indianapolis. He threw for 122 yards and no touchdowns, resulting in a 44.0 passer rating. However, the Jaguars' offense also struggled significantly, managing only a field goal. The decisive drive occurred in the fourth quarter, during which the Jaguars allowed Edgerrin James to gain 63 yards on an 88-yard touchdown drive, resulting in a 10–3 win for the Colts.

The two teams again faced off on December 11 in Jacksonville, both vying for the AFC South title. The Colts entered the matchup riding a 12–game winning streak, remaining undefeated, while the Jaguars boasted a 9–3 record. However, the Jaguars struggled to match the Colts' performance, as the Colts jumped to a 26–3 lead before ultimately winning 26–18. This win not only clinched the AFC South for the Colts but also granted them a first-round bye, home-field advantage throughout the playoffs and extended their winning streak to 13 games. Additionally, they achieved a sweep of the AFC South for the first time in franchise history.

Despite being swept, the Jaguars secured their first playoff appearance since 1999 with a victory over the Texans. In the playoffs, the Jaguars were eliminated by the Patriots, whereas the Colts experienced a surprising defeat in a notable game against the eventual Super Bowl champions Steelers.

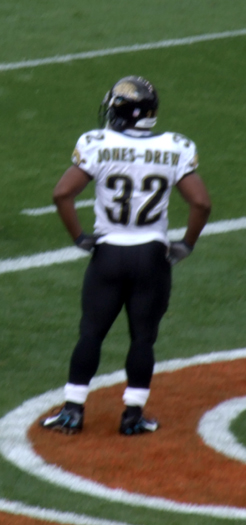
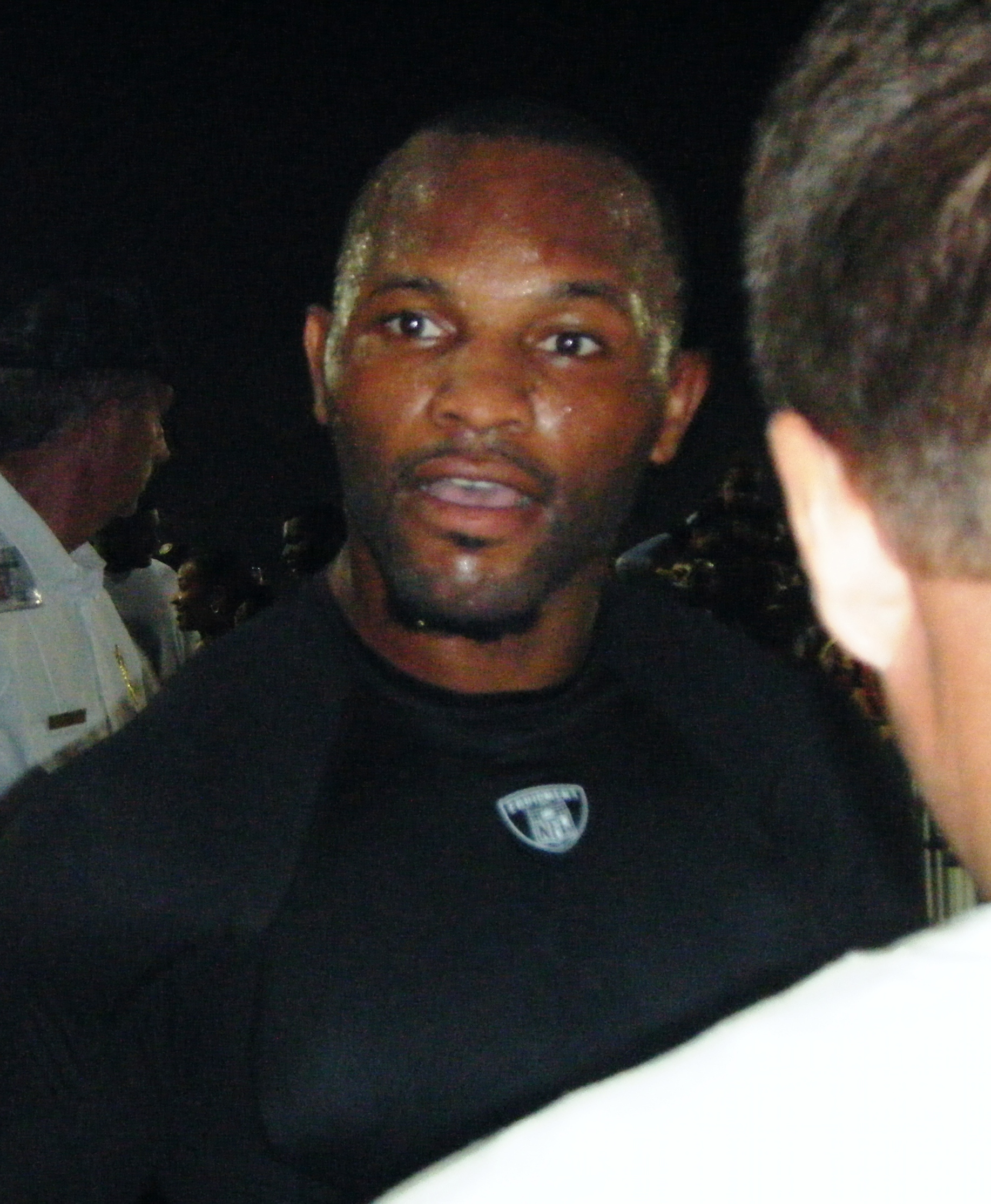
The Jaguars gained a reputation for their strong rushing performance against the Colts. Notably, in a game from the 2006 season, running backs Maurice Jones-Drew (left) and Fred Taylor (right) rushed for 166 yards and 131 yards, respectively. Their combined efforts contributed to the Jaguars setting a franchise record of 375 rushing yards in a single game, which also marked the most rushing yards allowed by the Colts in their franchise history.

During the 2006 season, the Jaguars established a franchise record for total rushing yards during their game against the Colts on December 10 in Jacksonville. The Colts had previously defeated the Jaguars 21–14 in their earlier matchup on September 24 in Indianapolis, and a victory in this matchup would secure them the AFC South. Against the league's worst rushing defense, the Jaguars amassed 375 rushing yards en route to a 44–17 win and a franchise record for most total rushing yards in a game, while the Colts set a new franchise record for the most rushing yards allowed in a game. Jaguars' RBs Maurice Jones-Drew led the charge with 166 rushing yards on 15 carries with two touchdowns, Fred Taylor added 131 rushing yards on 9 carries with one touchdown, and Alvin Pearman contributed 71 rushing yards on 13 carries with one touchdown. Additionally, Maurice Jones-Drew amassed 303 all-purpose yards, setting a franchise record for most all-purpose yards in a game.

Despite improving to an 8–5 record with their win, the Jaguars lost their last three games and failed to qualify for the playoffs. In contrast, the Colts rebounded and concluded the season with a 12–4 record and secured the 3rd seed. In the playoffs, they went on to defeat the Kansas City Chiefs, Baltimore Ravens, and Patriots to reach their third Super Bowl appearance. In Super Bowl XLI, the Colts defeated the Chicago Bears 29–17, securing their second Super Bowl Championship and their first in Indianapolis.

Both teams began the 2007 season with good records; however, during their first encounter on October 22 in Jacksonville, the defending Super Bowl champions Colts aimed to rectify their last season defeat, successfully limiting the Jaguars' running backs to a decisive 29–7 victory in a Monday Night Football matchup. Following the game, Manning would later remark that they "put a lot of emphasis on this game."

Both teams were competing for the AFC South when they met again on December 2 in Indianapolis, marking their last matchup at the RCA Dome. The Jaguars entered the game with an 8–3 record, while the Colts boasted a 9–2 record. The match remained competitive throughout; but the Colts emerged victorious with a narrow 28–25 win, completing a season sweep over the Jaguars.

The Colts clinched the AFC South title and the 2nd seed after defeating the Raiders, coupled with the Steelers loss to the Jaguars. The following week, the Jaguars earned the 5th seed with a victory against the Raiders. In the playoffs, the Colts were defeated by the Chargers, while the Jaguars defeated the Steelers but fell to the undefeated Patriots.

=== 2008–2009: Colts resume their dominance ===
Entering the 2008 season, analysts predicted a competitive race in the AFC South, primarily between the Jaguars and the Colts, with several experts favoring the Jaguars to emerge victorious. The Colts faced off against the Jaguars on September 21 at the newly built Lucas Oil Stadium in Indianapolis. In a manner reminiscent of their 2004 victory, Josh Scobee kicked a game-winning 51-yard field goal in the final seconds, securing a 23–21 victory for the Jaguars.

They met again on December 18 in Jacksonville for a Thursday Night Football matchup. The Jaguars were eliminated from contention due to subpar performance and injuries, while the Colts saw their consecutive AFC South title streak come to an end at the hands of the Titans. Nevertheless, a victory for the Colts in this matchup would clinch a playoff spot. Trailing by 10 points as they entered the fourth quarter, Manning led a comeback for the Colts, and a pick-six allowed them to take the lead, winning 31–24 and clinching the 5th seed in the playoffs.

In the 2009 season, the Colts achieved one of the most impressive beginnings in NFL history. Approaching their Thursday Night Football game against the Jaguars on December 17 in Jacksonville, the Colts boasted a 13–0 record and a remarkable 22–game regular season winning streak that extended from the prior season. Despite already securing home-field advantage for the playoffs after last week's victory over the Broncos, they opted to field nearly all their starters against the Jaguars, who were fighting to maintain their playoff hopes. This highly anticipated game led to a sellout crowd at the Jacksonville Municipal Stadium, marking the only time that season. The offensive showdown featured no punts until the fourth quarter and multiple lead changes. Ultimately, the decisive moment came when Manning connected with WR Reggie Wayne for a 65–yard touchdown pass, allowing the Colts to secure a 35–31 victory. The Colts extended their regular season winning streak to 23 games, an NFL record; however, the streak came to an end the following week with a defeat against the Jets. Furthermore, the Colts accomplished a sweep of the AFC South for the second time in their history.

The Jaguars ended the season with a losing streak and missed the playoffs. In the playoffs, the Colts went on to lose Super Bowl XLIV to the New Orleans Saints.

=== 2010: Longest field goal in Jaguars history and final Peyton Manning season ===
In the 2010 season on October 3 in Jacksonville, Josh Scobee kicked a game-winning 59–yard field goal, setting a record for the longest field goal made in Jaguars' franchise history and securing a 31–28 victory for them. The record would later be broken when Cam Little made a 68-yard field goal in 2025, which not only set a new Jaguars franchise record but an NFL record.

On December 19, the two teams faced off in Indianapolis with significant playoff stakes. The Jaguars held the top position in the AFC South with an 8–5 record, while the Colts were close behind at 7–6. A victory for the Jaguars would clinch their first-ever AFC South title, whereas a defeat for the Colts would effectively end their playoff hopes. In a departure from their previous encounters, the Colts excelled in their running game and effectively contained the Jaguars' offense. This helped them to a 34–24 victory, preventing the Jaguars from clinching the AFC South and allowing the Colts to dictate their playoff fate. The Jaguars went on to lose their last two games, resulting in them missing the playoffs. Conversely, the Colts' resurgence enabled them to capture the AFC South title for the seventh time in eight seasons.

This would turn out to be the last season Peyton Manning played for the Colts. Through the 19 games he played against the Jaguars as a Colts quarterback, he finished with a passer rating of 99.8 with 5,243 yards, 38 touchdowns and 13 interceptions, leading to a 14–5 record. He was instrumental in the Colts' overall success during that period, particularly in their dominance over the Jaguars.

=== 2011: Jaguars' first season sweep of the Colts ===
Following Peyton Manning's neck surgery, he did not start in any games for the Colts in the 2011 NFL season. As a result, the team's highly ranked offense and defense from the prior season significantly declined. Despite the Jaguars' overall struggles, they beat the Colts twice to record their first season sweep of the Colts. Additionally, they became the first AFC South team since the 2002 Titans to accomplish a sweep of the Colts, and the only AFC South team that did not suffer a loss to the Colts that season. The Colts' defeat to the Jaguars in their season finale positioned the Colts to secure the first overall pick in the 2012 NFL draft, leading them to select the highly regarded prospect Stanford QB Andrew Luck while parting ways with Peyton Manning.

== 2012–2018: Andrew Luck era ==
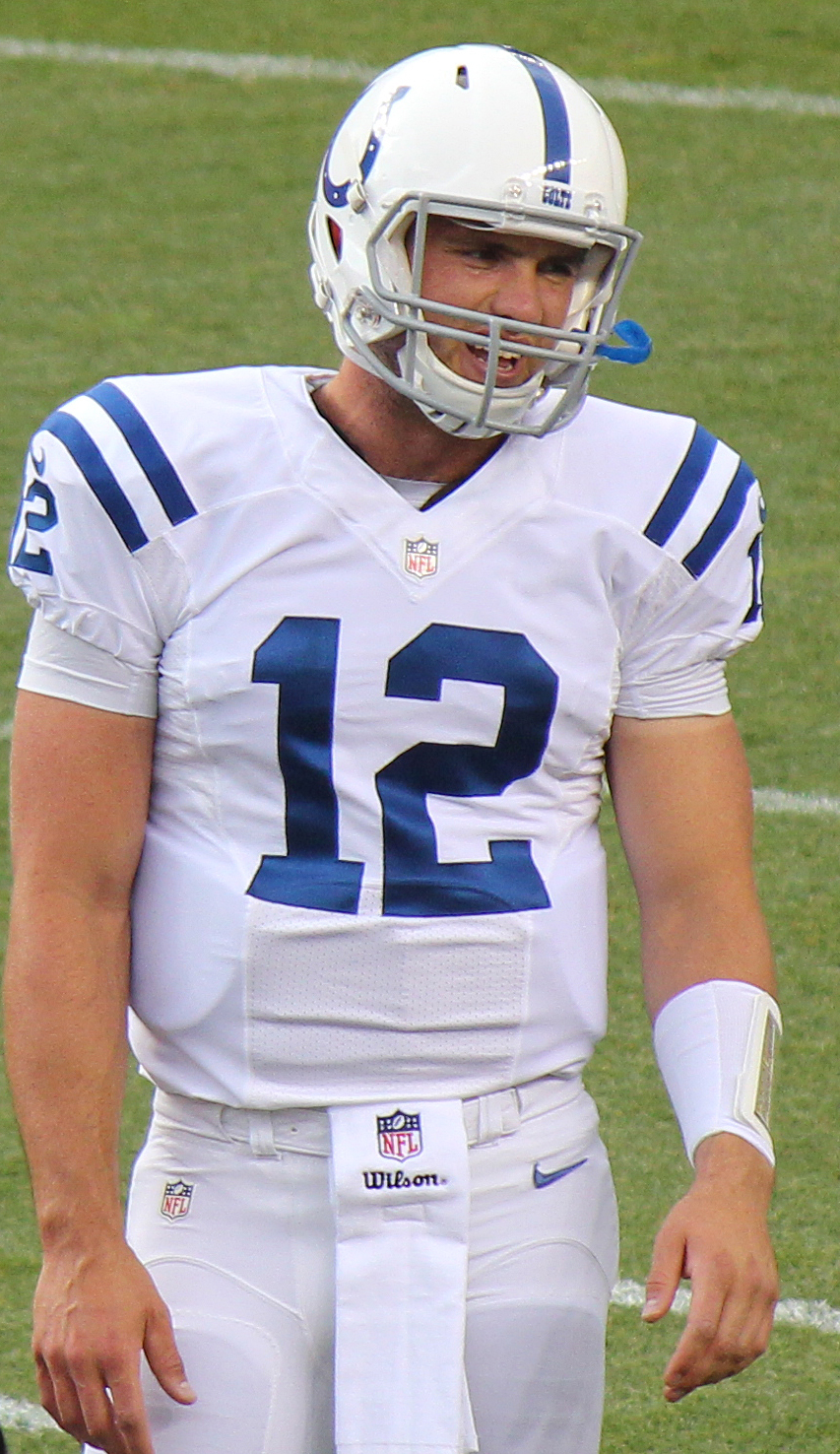
Quarterback Andrew Luck finished with a 7–3 record against the Jaguars and significantly contributed to the Colts success during the 2010s.

=== 2012: Andrew Luck makes his debut ===
In the 2012 season, Andrew Luck made his debut against the Jaguars on September 23 in Indianapolis. He threw two touchdown passes, helping the Colts take a 14–3 lead at halftime. However, the Jaguars rallied in the fourth quarter. In the final minutes, Luck guided the Colts down the field for a field goal that put them back into the lead. Yet, the very first play of the next drive saw Jaguars' QB Blaine Gabbert connect with WR Cecil Shorts, who dashed 80 yards for a touchdown, ultimately leading the Jaguars to a 22–17 victory and spoiling Luck's debut in the rivalry.

The game marked a turning point for the Colts, who subsequently enhanced their performance for the remainder of the season, ultimately securing the 5th seed and avenging their earlier loss to the Jaguars. The Jaguars concluded their season with a disappointing 2–14 record, with their victory over the Colts being one of their few highlights.

=== 2013–2014: Colts dominate the Jaguars ===
In the 2013 season, the Colts recorded their biggest victory against the Jaguars on September 29 in Jacksonville. Although the Jaguars initially led 3–0 at the end of the first quarter, the Colts dominated the remainder of the game, winning 37–3. This marked their largest victory over the Jaguars, with a 34–point difference. The Colts won again over the Jaguars in their season finale to complete their third sweep of the AFC South.

The Colts continued their strong performance throughout the 2014 season. On September 21, they crushed the Jaguars 44–17 in Jacksonville, scoring their most points in a game against the Jaguars. Andrew Luck had one of his best performances, completing 31–of–39 for 370 yards and four touchdowns. The Colts would go on to sweep their division again.

=== 2015–2016: Luck gets injured and London game ===
Andrew Luck was unable to participate in his first NFL game due to a right shoulder injury in the 2015 season, as the Colts faced the Jaguars on October 4 in Indianapolis. In a low-scoring game, Jaguars K Jason Myers missed two game-winning field goals: a 53-yarder at the end of regulation and a 48-yarder in overtime. In response, Colts backup QB Matt Hasselbeck orchestrated a 53–yard drive that ended with K Adam Vinatieri successfully converting a game-winning 27-yard field goal, winning 16–13.

Jaguars recorded their biggest victory over the Colts on December 13 in Jacksonville, with Hasselbeck once again taking over for Luck. The game began slowly, with the Colts holding a 13–9 lead at halftime. However, the Jaguars surged in the second half, outscoring the Colts 42–3 and scoring on every possession, ultimately dominating the Colts to a 51–16 victory. This victory marked a franchise record for the Jaguars in terms of points scored in a regular season game, represented their largest victory over the Colts with a 35–point differential, ended a six-game losing streak against them, and snapped the Colts' 16-game winning streak in the AFC South, which stands as an NFL record in all divisional play.

Instead of hosting a game in Jacksonville during the 2016 season, the NFL arranged for the Jaguars and Colts to compete at the Wembley Stadium in Wembley, London. This matchup was designated as a home game for Jacksonville as part of the league's international series. In a crowd that evenly supported both teams, the Colts struggled with dropped passes and penalties, allowing the Jaguars to establish a 23–6 lead by the beginning of the fourth quarter. Although Luck and the Colts tried to mount a comeback, the Jaguars held on to a 30–27 victory.

=== 2017: Sacksonville sacks the Colts ===
Andrew Luck missed the 2017 season season due to shoulder surgery. The Jaguars, initially expected to be one of the weakest teams, have surprisingly started strong, thanks in large part to their defense, which was being nicknamed "Sacksonville". When the Jaguars faced the Colts on October 22 in Indianapolis, their defense dominated, sacking backup QB Jacoby Brissett 10 times, equaling the franchise's single-game record set in their season-opener against the Texans, and securing a 27–0 shutout victory. This performance tied the Colts for the second-most sacks allowed in a single game. The Jaguars achieved their first shutout since a 41–0 win over the Jets in the 2006 season, while the Colts experienced their first shutout since the 2002 playoffs, where they lost 41–0 to the Jets, and their first regular-season shutout since 1993. Additionally, the Jaguars amassed 518 total yards, ranking as the third highest in franchise history. Following the game, the Jaguars' Twitter account (now referred to as X) updated its name to "Sacksonville" to fully embrace the moment.

Before their second matchup on December 3 in Jacksonville, the Jacksonville International Airport displayed signs celebrating the Jaguars' victory over the Colts in their earlier meeting. The Jaguars dominated the Colts again that marked their second sweep of the team since the inception of the AFC South. During the game, DT Calais Campbell established a new single-season sack record for the Jaguars. This sweep of the Colts ultimately played a crucial role in the Jaguars achieving their first AFC South title.

=== 2018: Final Andrew Luck season ===
Luck returned in the 2018 season when the Colts faced the Jaguars on November 11 in Indianapolis. The Jaguars, a popular preseason pick, had a rocky start to the season, entering the game with a 3–5 record. The Colts scored 29 points in the first half, which ultimately proved to be enough. The Jaguars attempted a rally and were approaching Indianapolis territory to tie the game, but a fumble by WR Rashad Greene ultimately secured a 29–26 victory for the Colts. Luck completed 21–of–29 passes for 285 yards and threw three touchdown passes.

Although both teams were heading in vastly different directions, the Jaguars achieved one of their biggest defensive wins against the Colts on December 2 in Jacksonville. In a match devoid of touchdowns from either team, the Jaguars defeated the Colts 6–0. The Colts, who entered the game ranked fourth in the league for scoring, passed on two field-goal attempts in the first half, including one initially successful but later nullified. They finished going 5–18 on third downs and 0–3 on fourth downs, all within field-goal range. This win ended the Jaguars seven-game losing streak and the Colts five-game winning streak. Following a 1–5 start, the Colts went 9–1 the rest of the season to finish at 10–6, with this loss to Jacksonville being their only loss during that stretch.

This would be the last time Luck took the field as a starter in this series, as he unexpectedly announced his retirement in the subsequent offseason. Throughout 10 games against the Jaguars, Luck recorded a 93.9 passer rating, accumulating 2,790 yards, 17 touchdowns, and 7 interceptions, leading to a 7–3 record. His contributions were pivotal in shifting the rivalry in favor of the Colts and enhancing their overall success.

== 2019–present: Rivalry tilts in Jaguars favor ==
=== 2020–2021: Jaguars 1-win season and controlling the Colts playoff chances ===
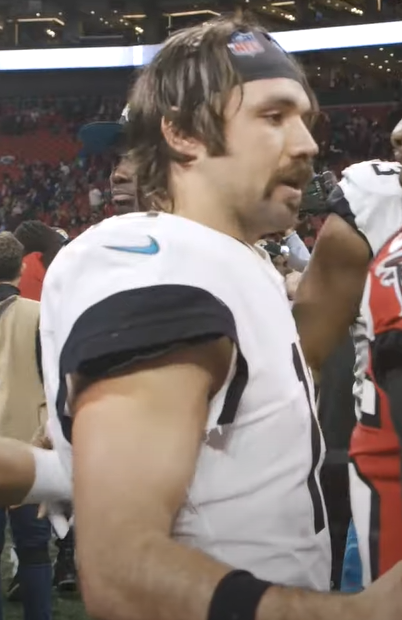
In the 2020 season opener against the Colts, Jaguars quarterback Gardner Minshew completed 19–of–20 for 173 yards and three touchdowns, guiding the Jaguars to their only win in the 2020 season. Minshew would later start for the Colts in the 2023 season following a season-ending injury to QB Anthony Richardson.

After trading away many of their key players, the Jaguars were expected to rank among the weakest teams in the NFL in the 2020 season. In the season opener on September 13 in Jacksonville, the Colts were favored by 8 points over the Jaguars. In the game, the Colts didn't punt once, allowed no sacks of QB Philip Rivers, outgained the Jaguars 445–241 in total yardage and won the time-of-possession battle 33:23 to 26:37. Despite these advantages, missed opportunities, two interceptions by Rivers that led to 10 Jaguars points, and the Colts' defense allowing Jaguars QB Gardner Minshew to complete 19–of–20 for 173 yards, three touchdowns, and no interceptions resulted in a shocking 27–20 victory for the Jaguars. This victory would ultimately be the Jaguars' only win in their 2020 season.

As the season finale approached on January 3 in Indianapolis, the Colts found themselves in a good playoff position following the Dolphins' loss to the Bills. The Colts needed a win to secure a playoff berth against the struggling Jaguars, who were enduring a 15–game losing streak, having not won since their initial victory over the Colts in week 1. Despite the game once again being tightly contested, the Jaguars ultimately allowed Colts' rookie RB Jonathan Taylor to set a franchise record by rushing for 253 yards and make a pivotal 45–yard touchdown run to the end zone with 3:35 remaining, leading the Colts to a 28–14 win. The Colts clinched the 7th seed in the AFC, making them the first AFC 7th seed as the playoff format was expanded in the offseason. Conversely, the Jaguars concluded the season with a dismal 1–15 record, the worst in franchise history, with their sole win being against the Colts. However, they had the first overall pick in the 2021 NFL draft, which they used to select Clemson QB Trevor Lawrence.

In the 2021 season finale, the Colts once again found themselves in a favorable playoff position as they faced the Jaguars on January 9 in Jacksonville. Although they had lost the AFC South title to the Titans the week prior, a victory against the struggling 2–14 Jaguars, who were on an eight-game losing streak, would clinch a playoff berth for the Colts. The matchup, referred to as the "Clown game" due to some Jaguars fans donning clown costumes in protest of owner Shad Khan's decision to retain general manager Trent Baalke, ended in a surprising upset as the Jaguars defeated the Colts 26–11. The Jaguars established an early lead that they maintained throughout the game, led by Trevor Lawrence completing 23–of–32 for 223 yards, two touchdowns, and no interceptions, his first game with multiple TD passes since the season opener. The Jaguars' defense, which had allowed 50 points to the Patriots the week prior, limited Jonathan Taylor, the NFL's leading rusher, to 77 yards on 15 carries and stopped him on fourth down twice. Additionally, they restricted Colts QB Carson Wentz to 17–of–29 for 185 yards and no touchdowns, while sacking him six times and forcing two turnovers. This victory not only ended the Jaguars' eight-game losing streak but also eliminated the Colts from playoff contention following the Steelers' win over the Ravens.

=== 2022: Jaguars become competitive with Trevor Lawrence ===
The embarrassments continued for the Colts in the 2022 season, suffering a 24–0 shutout loss to the Jaguars on September 18 in Jacksonville. This defeat marked the third occasion in the last six seasons that the Colts were shutout by the Jaguars. Additionally, it was the Jaguars' first shutout since the 2018 season, which was also against the Colts.

The Colts managed to secure a measure of revenge when QB Matt Ryan delivered a game-winning 32–yard touchdown pass with just 17 seconds remaining on October 16 in Indianapolis, leading the team to a 34–27 victory.

Despite pre-season predictions that favored the Colts to win the AFC South and projected the Jaguars to finish near the bottom of the division, the Jaguars ultimately claimed the AFC South championship while the Colts ended the season with a 4–12–1 record.

=== 2023–present: Trevor Lawrence vs. Anthony Richardson ===
The 2023 season showcased the first matchup between Trevor Lawrence and QB Anthony Richardson, the latter being selected by the Colts in the 2023 NFL draft. This closely fought contest took place on September 10 in Indianapolis, where the Jaguars emerged victorious with a score of 31–21.

In their second encounter on October 15 in Jacksonville, Richardson did not take the field as the starter; instead, former Jaguars quarterback Gardner Minshew led the Colts. The Jaguars' defense capitalized on Minshew's performance, forcing him into four turnovers, resulting in a 37–20 victory for the Jaguars and completing a season sweep of the Colts.

Both teams ultimately concluded the season with 9–8 records, but neither managed to qualify for the playoffs.

== Season-by-season results ==
Indianapolis Colts vs. Jacksonville Jaguars Season-by-Season Results
1990s–2000s (Colts, 14–4)

Season	Season series	at Indianapolis Colts	at Jacksonville Jaguars	Overall series	Notes
1995	Colts 1–0	—N/a	Colts; 41–31	Colts; 1–0	Jaguars join the National Football League (NFL) as an expansion team. They are placed in the American Football Conference (AFC) and the AFC Central.
2000	Colts 1–0	Colts; 43–14	—N/a	Colts; 2–0	
2002	Colts 2–0	Colts; 20–13	Colts; 28–25	Colts; 4–0	During the NFL realignment, both teams are placed in the newly formed AFC South, resulting in two meetings annually. In Indianapolis, the Colts clinched a playoff berth with their win.
2003	Tie 1–1	Colts; 23–13	Jaguars; 28–23	Colts; 5–1	
2004	Tie 1–1	Jaguars; 27–24	Colts; 24–17	Colts; 6–2	Colts' loss to the Broncos eliminated the Jaguars from playoff contention, preventing a potential wild-card matchup between the Colts and Jaguars.
2005	Colts 2–0	Colts; 10–3	Colts; 26–18	Colts; 8–2	In Jacksonville, the Colts clinched the AFC South, secured the AFC's 1st seed, and swept the AFC South for the first time in franchise history with their win.
2006	Tie 1–1	Colts; 21–14	Jaguars; 44–17	Colts; 9–3	In Jacksonville, Jaguars finish with 375 rushing yards, setting a franchise record for their most rushing yards in a game. Meanwhile, the Colts set a franchise record for their most rushing yards allowed in a game. Colts win Super Bowl XLI.
2007	Colts 2–0	Colts; 28–25	Colts; 29–7	Colts; 11–3	Last matchup at RCA Dome.
2008	Tie 1–1	Jaguars; 23–21	Colts; 31–24	Colts; 12–4	Colts open Lucas Oil Stadium. Colts clinch a playoff berth with their win.
2009	Colts 2–0	Colts; 14–12	Colts; 35–31	Colts; 14–4	In Jacksonville, Colts extended their regular-season game-winning streak to 23 games, setting an NFL record, and swept the AFC South for a second time with their win.

2010s (Tie, 10–10)

Season	Season series	at Indianapolis Colts	at Jacksonville Jaguars	Overall series	Notes
2010	Tie 1–1	Colts; 34–24	Jaguars; 31–28	Colts; 15–5	Last start in the series for Colts' QB Peyton Manning. In Jacksonville, Jaguars' K Josh Scobee kicked a game-winning 59-yard field goal, setting a franchise record for their longest field goal made (broken by Cam Little in 2025). Colts' win prevented the Jaguars from clinching their first AFC South title.
2011	Jaguars 2–0	Jaguars; 17–3	Jaguars; 19–13	Colts; 15–7	Jaguars record their first season series sweep against the Colts. Colts clinch the first overall pick in the 2012 NFL draft with their loss in Jacksonville.
2012	Tie 1–1	Jaguars; 22–17	Colts; 27–10	Colts; 16–8	Colts draft QB Andrew Luck. Jaguars' win is their only road win in the 2012 season.
2013	Colts 2–0	Colts; 30–10	Colts; 37–3	Colts; 18–8	In Jacksonville, Colts record their largest victory against the Jaguars with a 34–point differential. In Indianapolis, Colts swept the AFC South division with their win. Starting with that loss, the Jaguars went on a 13-game road losing streak.
2014	Colts 2–0	Colts; 23–3	Colts; 44–17	Colts; 20–8	In Jacksonville, Colts score their most points in a game against the Jaguars. Colts swept the AFC South division for a second consecutive year. As of November 2, 2026, this remains the Colts' most recent season series sweep against the Jaguars.
2015	Tie 1–1	Colts; 16–13 (OT)	Jaguars; 51–16	Colts; 21–9	First overtime result between the two teams. In Jacksonville, Jaguars record their largest victory over the Colts, set a franchise record for their most points scored in a regular season game, and ended the Colts' NFL record 16–game winning streak against division opponents.
2016	Tie 1–1	Colts; 24–20	Jaguars; 30–27	Colts; 22–10	Jaguars home game was played at Wembley Stadium in Wembley, London as part of the NFL International Series. In Indianapolis, Colts overcame a 17–0 deficit.
2017	Jaguars 2–0	Jaguars; 27–0	Jaguars; 30–10	Colts; 22–12	In Indianapolis, Jaguars recorded 10 sacks, tying a franchise record. Following that win, the Jaguars went on a 14-game road losing streak against divisional opponents. In Jacksonville, Jaguars' DE Calais Campbell became the new single-season sack leader for the Jaguars (broken by DE Josh Hines-Allen in 2023).
2018	Tie 1–1	Colts; 29–26	Jaguars; 6–0	Colts; 23–13	Final season for Andrew Luck.
2019	Tie 1–1	Colts; 33–13	Jaguars; 38–20	Colts; 24–14	

2020s (Jaguars, 9–4)

Season	Season series	at Indianapolis Colts	at Jacksonville Jaguars	Overall series	Notes
2020	Tie 1–1	Colts; 28–14	Jaguars; 27–20	Colts; 25–15	Following their win, the Jaguars went on a 20-game losing streak. Jaguars' win was their only win in their 2020 season. Colts clinch the final playoff spot with their win.
2021	Tie 1–1	Colts; 23–17	Jaguars; 26–11	Colts; 26–16	Jaguars' win eliminated the Colts from playoff contention.
2022	Tie 1–1	Colts; 34–27	Jaguars; 24–0	Colts; 27–17	
2023	Jaguars 2–0	Jaguars; 31–21	Jaguars; 37–20	Colts; 27–19	
2024	Tie 1–1	Colts; 26–23 (OT)	Jaguars; 37–34	Colts; 28–20	
2025	Jaguars 2–0	Jaguars; 23–17	Jaguars; 36–19	Colts; 28–22	
2026	Jaguars 1–0	January 9/10	Jaguars; 42–7	Colts; 28–23	In Jacksonville, Jaguars tied their largest victory against the Colts (2015). Jaguars win 12 straight home meetings (2015–present).

Summary of Results

Season	Season series	at Indianapolis Colts	at Jacksonville Jaguars	Notes
Regular season	Colts 28–23	Colts 18–7	Jaguars 16–10	Jaguars are 1–0 at Wembley Stadium in Wembley, London (2016), which was a Jaguars' home game.

== See also ==
- National Football League rivalries
- AFC South
