= 2014 Carolina Panthers season =

20th season in franchise history

- Owner: Jerry Richardson
- General manager: Dave Gettleman
- Head coach: Ron Rivera
- Offensive coordinator: Mike Shula
- Defensive coordinator: Sean McDermott
- Home stadium: Bank of America Stadium

Results
- Record: 7–8–1
- Division place: 1st NFC South
- Playoffs: Won Wild Card Playoffs (vs. Cardinals) 27–16; Lost Divisional Playoffs (at Seahawks) 17–31
- All-Pros: LB Luke Kuechly (1st team)
- Pro Bowlers: TE Greg Olsen; LB Luke Kuechly

Uniform
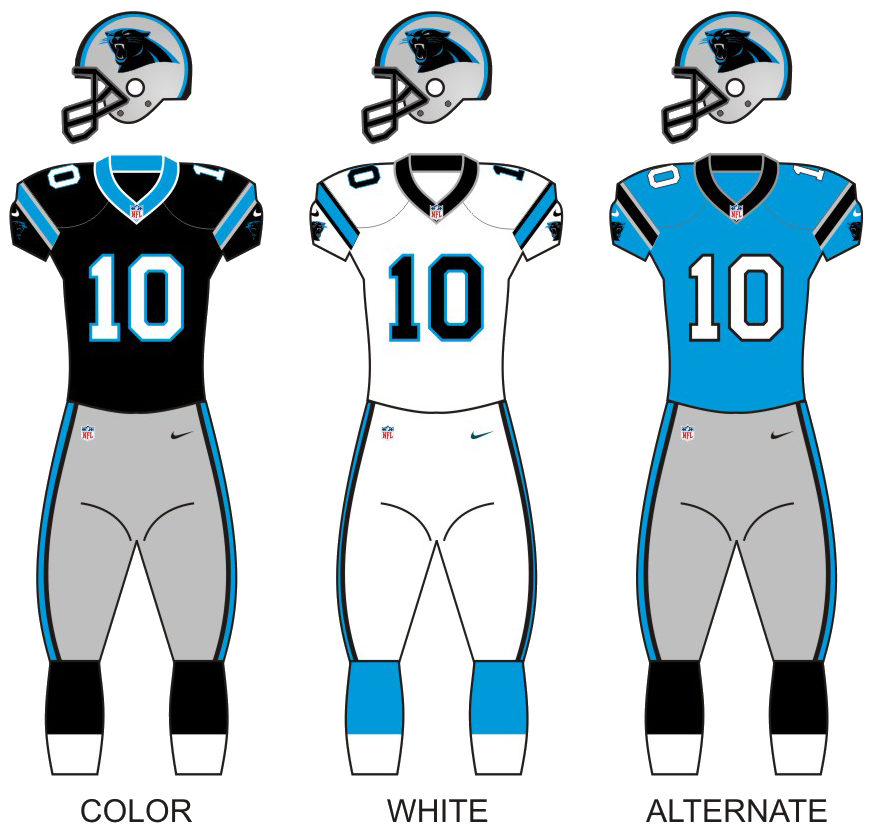

The 2014 season was the Carolina Panthers' 20th in the National Football League (NFL) and their fourth under head coach Ron Rivera.

The Panthers captured their second straight NFC South division title and qualified for the postseason for the first time in back-to-back years despite failing to improve on a 12–4 record and finishing with a losing record of 7–8–1. Additionally, they became the first team in NFC South history to have back-to-back division titles and also became the second team to win a division title with a sub-.500 record in a full season after the 2010 Seattle Seahawks, and would be followed by the 2020 Washington Football Team, a team that Rivera also coached, and the 2022 Tampa Bay Buccaneers and their 2025 Carolina Panthers team. The Panthers defeated the Arizona Cardinals in the Wild Card round, but lost to the Seattle Seahawks in the Divisional round.

The Panthers' four-game winning streak to close out the regular season, combined with a 14–0 start the following season, would achieve a tie with the 2003–2004 New England Patriots for the third longest regular season winning streak in NFL history, at 18.

This was the first season since 2000 that Steve Smith Sr. was not on the opening-day roster, as he signed with the Baltimore Ravens.

== 2014 Draft Class ==
2014 Carolina Panthers Draft
Round	Selection	Player	Position	College
1	28	Kelvin Benjamin	Wide receiver	Florida State
2	60	Kony Ealy	Defensive end	Missouri
3	92	Trai Turner	Offensive guard	LSU
4	128	Tre Boston	Safety	North Carolina
5	148 (Note: The Panthers traded their original fifth- and one of their two seventh-round selections — Nos. 168 and 225 overall, respectively — to the Minnesota Vikings in exchange for the Vikings' fifth-round selection (No. 148 overall). The Panthers previously acquired the No. 225 overall selection in a trade that sent linebacker Jon Beason to the New York Giants.)	Bené Benwikere	Cornerback	San Jose State
6	204	Tyler Gaffney	Running back	Stanford
7	None (Note: The Panthers traded their original seventh-round selection (No. 243 overall) to the San Francisco 49ers in exchange for safety Colin Jones.)			

== Staff ==
2014 Carolina Panthers staff
Front office: Owner/founder – Jerry Richardson; President – Danny Morrison; General manager – Dave Gettleman; Director of football operations – Brandon Beane; Director of team administration – Rob Rogers; Football operations manager – Bryan Porter; Football operations assistant – Matt Allen; Football operations assistant – Mike Anderson; Director of pro scouting – Mark Koncz; Director of college scouting – Don Gregory; National scout – Jeff Morrow; National scout – Mike Szabo; Director of player development – Mark Carrier; Executive assistant to the Head Coach – Linda O'Hora; Head coaches: Head coach – Ron Rivera; Offensive coaches: Offensive coordinator – Mike Shula; Quarterbacks – Ken Dorsey; Running backs – Jim Skipper; Wide receivers – Ricky Proehl; Tight ends – Pete Hoener; Offensive line – John Matsko; Assistant offensive line – Ray Brown; Senior offensive assistant – John Ramsdell	Defensive coaches: Defensive coordinator – Sean McDermott; Defensive line – Eric Washington; Assistant defensive line – Sam Mills III; Linebackers – Al Holcomb; Passing defense coordinator/secondary – Steven Wilks; Defensive assistant/defensive backs – Curtis Fuller; Special teams coaches: Special teams coordinator – Richard Rodgers; Assistant special teams – Bruce DeHaven; Strength and conditioning: Strength and conditioning – Joe Kenn; Assistant strength and conditioning – Jason Benguche

== Final roster ==
2014 Carolina Panthers roster
Quarterbacks (QB): 3 Derek Anderson; 1 Cam Newton; Running backs (RB): 28 Jonathan Stewart; 35 Mike Tolbert FB; 43 Fozzy Whittaker KR; 34 DeAngelo Williams; Wide receivers (WR): 13 Kelvin Benjamin; 11 Brenton Bersin PR; 16 Corey Brown; 82 Jerricho Cotchery; 14 Joe Webb; Tight ends (TE): 84 Ed Dickson; 88 Greg Olsen; 86 Brandon Williams	Offensive linemen (OL): 77 Byron Bell T; 64 Brian Folkerts C; 63 David Foucault T; 67 Ryan Kalil C; 68 Andrew Norwell G; 74 Mike Remmers T; 79 Chris Scott G; 66 Amini Silatolu G; 70 Trai Turner G; 75 Fernando Velasco G; Defensive linemen (DL): 97 Mario Addison DE; 90 Frank Alexander DE; 91 Colin Cole DT; 94 Kony Ealy DE; 92 Dwan Edwards DT; 96 Wes Horton DE; 95 Charles Johnson DE; 98 Star Lotulelei DT; 61 Kyle Love DT; 99 Kawann Short DT	Linebackers (LB): 58 Thomas Davis OLB; 53 Ben Jacobs MLB; 56 A. J. Klein OLB; 59 Luke Kuechly MLB; 52 Kevin Reddick OLB; 57 Adarius Taylor OLB; Defensive backs (DB): 25 Bené Benwikere CB; 33 Tre Boston FS; 37 Carrington Byndom CB; 21 Thomas DeCoud FS; 31 James Dockery CB; 41 Roman Harper SS; 42 Colin Jones FS; 38 Robert Lester SS; 24 Josh Norman CB; 23 Melvin White CB; Special teams (ST): 9 Graham Gano K; 44 J. J. Jansen LS; 8 Brad Nortman P	Practice squad: 62 Derek Dennis G; 80 Kevin Greene TE; 87 Stephen Hill WR; 83 Marcus Lucas TE; 27 Kimario McFadden S; 55 Horace Miller LB; 36 Darrin Reaves RB; 72 Micanor Regis DT; 73 Martin Wallace T; 22 Lou Young CB; Reserve: 93 Chase Blackburn LB (IR); 47 Richie Brockel FB (IR); 78 Nate Chandler T (IR); 76 Greg Hardy DE (Exempt); 72 Kevin Hughes T (IR); 71 Edmund Kugbila G (IR); 60 Kevin Matthews C (IR); 10 De'Andre Presley WR (IR); 65 Garry Williams T (IR); Rookies in italics 53 active, 9 reserve, 10 practice squad

== Schedule ==
=== Preseason ===
The Panthers' preseason opponents were announced on April 9, 2014.

Week	Date	Opponent	Result	Record	Venue	Recap
1	August 8	Buffalo Bills	**L** 18–20	0–1	Bank of America Stadium	Recap
2	August 17	Kansas City Chiefs	**W** 28–16	1–1	Bank of America Stadium	Recap
3	August 22	at New England Patriots	**L** 7–30	1–2	Gillette Stadium	Recap
4	August 28	at Pittsburgh Steelers	**W** 10–0	2–2	Heinz Field	Recap

=== Regular season ===
Week	Date	Opponent	Result	Record	Venue	Recap
1	September 7	at **Tampa Bay Buccaneers**	**W** 20–14	1–0	Raymond James Stadium	Recap
2	September 14	Detroit Lions	**W** 24–7	2–0	Bank of America Stadium	Recap
3	September 21	Pittsburgh Steelers	**L** 19–37	2–1	Bank of America Stadium	Recap
4	September 28	at Baltimore Ravens	**L** 10–38	2–2	M&T Bank Stadium	Recap
5	October 5	Chicago Bears	**W** 31–24	3–2	Bank of America Stadium	Recap
6	October 12	at Cincinnati Bengals	**T** 37–37 (OT)	3–2–1	Paul Brown Stadium	Recap
7	October 19	at Green Bay Packers	**L** 17–38	3–3–1	Lambeau Field	Recap
8	October 26	Seattle Seahawks	**L** 9–13	3–4–1	Bank of America Stadium	Recap
9	October 30	**New Orleans Saints**	**L** 10–28	3–5–1	Bank of America Stadium	Recap
10	November 10	at Philadelphia Eagles	**L** 21–45	3–6–1	Lincoln Financial Field	Recap
11	November 16	**Atlanta Falcons**	**L** 17–19	3–7–1	Bank of America Stadium	Recap
12	Bye					
13	November 30	at Minnesota Vikings	**L** 13–31	3–8–1	TCF Bank Stadium	Recap
14	December 7	at **New Orleans Saints**	**W** 41–10	4–8–1	Mercedes-Benz Superdome	Recap
15	December 14	**Tampa Bay Buccaneers**	**W** 19–17	5–8–1	Bank of America Stadium	Recap
16	December 21	Cleveland Browns	**W** 17–13	6–8–1	Bank of America Stadium	Recap
17	December 28	at **Atlanta Falcons**	**W** 34–3	7–8–1	Georgia Dome	Recap
Note: Intra-division opponents are in **bold** text.

=== Postseason ===
Round	Date	Opponent (seed)	Result	Record	Venue	Recap
Wild Card	January 3, 2015	Arizona Cardinals (5)	**W** 27–16	1–0	Bank of America Stadium	Recap
Divisional	January 10, 2015	at Seattle Seahawks (1)	**L** 17–31	1–1	CenturyLink Field	Recap

== Game summaries ==
=== Regular season ===
==== Week 1: at Tampa Bay Buccaneers ====
Week One: Carolina Panthers at Tampa Bay Buccaneers – Game summary

Quarter	1	2	3	4	Total
Panthers	0	10	0	10	20
Buccaneers	0	0	0	14	14

at Raymond James Stadium, Tampa, Florida

- Date: September 7
- Game time: 4:25 p.m. EDT
- Game weather: 88 °F (31 °C), cloudy
- Game attendance: 62,442
- Referee: Pete Morelli
- TV announcers (Fox): Chris Myers, Ronde Barber and Jennifer Hale
- Recap, Gamebook

Game information

First quarter

- No scoring plays.

Second quarter

- CAR – Greg Olsen 5-yard pass from Derek Anderson (Graham Gano kick), 7:59. Panthers 7–0. Drive: 15 plays, 69 yards, 9:00.
- CAR – Graham Gano 28-yard field goal, 0:00. Panthers 10–0. Drive: 10 plays, 47 yards, 1:53.

Third quarter

- No scoring plays.

Fourth quarter

- CAR – Kelvin Benjamin 26-yard pass from Derek Anderson (Graham Gano kick), 14:53. Panthers 17–0. Drive: 4 plays, 37 yards, 1:05.
- TB – Chris Owusu 19-yard pass from Josh McCown (Patrick Murray kick), 7:23. Panthers 17–7. Drive: 6 plays, 62 yards, 2:11.
- TB – Bobby Rainey 6-yard pass from Josh McCown (Patrick Murray kick), 2:06. Panthers 17–14. Drive: 9 plays, 61 yards, 2:17.
- CAR – Graham Gano 33-yard field goal, 0:23. Panthers 20–14. Drive: 4 plays, 8 yards, 1:04.

Top passers

- CAR – Derek Anderson – 24/34, 230 yards, 2 TD
- TB – Josh McCown – 22/35, 183 yards, 2 TD, 2 INT

Top rushers

- CAR – DeAngelo Williams – 14 rushes, 72 yards
- TB – Jorvorskie Lane – 1 rush, 54 yards

Top receivers

- CAR – Kelvin Benjamin – 6 receptions, 92 yards, TD
- TB – Brandon Myers – 6 receptions, 41 yards

Quarterback Derek Anderson made his first start, substituting for Cam Newton who was nursing a rib injury he'd sustained during the preseason.

==== Week 2: vs. Detroit Lions ====
Week Two: Detroit Lions at Carolina Panthers – Game summary

Quarter	1	2	3	4	Total
Lions	0	0	7	0	7
Panthers	0	6	7	11	24

at Bank of America Stadium, Charlotte, North Carolina

- Date: September 14
- Game time: 1:00 p.m. EDT
- Game weather: 70 °F (21 °C), cloudy
- Game attendance: 73,586
- Referee: Jerome Boger
- TV announcers (Fox): Chris Myers, Ronde Barber and Jennifer Hale
- Recap, Gamebook

Game information

First quarter

- No scoring plays.

Second quarter

- CAR – Graham Gano 29-yard field goal, 7:58. Panthers 3–0. Drive: 14 plays, 77 yards, 6:04.
- CAR – Graham Gano 53-yard field goal, 1:11. Panthers 6–0. Drive: 6 plays, 26 yds, 2:06.

Third quarter

- DET – Jed Collins 1-yard pass from Matthew Stafford (Nate Freese kick), 9:28. Lions 7–6. Drive: 8 plays, 63 yards, 4:01.
- CAR – Jason Avant 14-yard pass from Cam Newton (Graham Gano kick), 2:30. Panthers 13–7. Drive: 7 plays, 72 yards, 3:21.

Fourth quarter

- CAR – Jonathan Stewart 2-yard run (Cam Newton-Jerricho Cotchery pass), 7:26. Panthers 21–7. Drive: 9 plays, 70 yards, 4:53.
- CAR – Graham Gano 38-yard field goal, 4:45. Panthers 24–7. Drive: 4 plays, 13 yards, 2:31.

Top passers

- DET – Matthew Stafford – 27/48, 291 yards, TD, INT
- CAR – Cam Newton – 22/34, 281 yards, TD

Top rushers

- DET – Joique Bell – 10 rushes, 36 yards
- CAR – Jonathan Stewart – 15 rushes, 37 yards, TD

Top receivers

- DET – Calvin Johnson – 6 receptions, 83 yards
- CAR – Greg Olsen – 6 receptions, 72 yards

Newton returned to the starting lineup with some added padding around his ribs.

==== Week 3: vs. Pittsburgh Steelers ====
Week Three: Pittsburgh Steelers at Carolina Panthers – Game summary

Quarter	1	2	3	4	Total
Steelers	3	6	14	14	37
Panthers	3	0	3	13	19

at Bank of America Stadium, Charlotte, North Carolina

- Date: September 21
- Game time: 8:30 p.m. EDT
- Game weather: 79 °F (26 °C), clear
- Game attendance: 73,945
- Referee: Ron Torbert
- TV announcers (NBC): Al Michaels, Cris Collinsworth and Michele Tafoya
- Recap, Gamebook

Game information

First quarter

- CAR – Graham Gano 40-yard field goal, 6:40. Panthers 3–0. Drive: 9 plays, 58 yards, 3:55.
- PIT – Shaun Suisham 42-yard field goal, 0:07. Tied 3–3. Drive: 6 plays, 51 yards, 2:31.

Second quarter

- PIT – Shaun Suisham 24-yard field goal, 5:37. Steelers 6–3. Drive: 16 plays, 87 yards, 8:00.
- PIT – Shaun Suisham 45-yard field goal, 0:00. Steelers 9–3. Drive: 7 plays, 53 yards, 1:35.

Third quarter

- PIT – Antonio Brown 7-yard pass from Ben Roethlisberger (Shaun Suisham kick), 11:02. Steelers 16–3. Drive: 4 plays, 17 yards, 1:30.
- CAR – Graham Gano 40-yard field goal, 6:21. Steelers 16–6. Drive: 12 plays, 58 yards, 4:41.
- PIT – Antonio Brown 7-yard pass from Ben Roethlisberger (Shaun Suisham kick), 2:22. Steelers 23–6. Drive: 6 plays, 80 yards, 3:59.

Fourth quarter

- CAR – Greg Olsen 37-yard pass from Cam Newton (Graham Gano kick), 13:28. Steelers 23–13. Drive: 7 plays, 80 yards, 3:54.
- PIT – Robert Golden fumble recovery in endzone (Shaun Suisham kick), 11:00. Steelers 30–13.
- PIT – LeGarrette Blount 8-yard run (Shaun Suisham kick), 5:38. Steelers 37–13. Drive: 8 plays, 98 yards, 4:29.
- CAR – Kelvin Benjamin 35-yard pass from Derek Anderson (pass failed), 3:53. Steelers 37–19. Drive: 6 plays, 80 yards, 1:45.

Top passers

- PIT – Ben Roethlisberger – 22/30, 196 yards, 2 TD
- CAR – Cam Newton – 24/35, 250 yards, TD

Top rushers

- PIT – Le'Veon Bell – 21 rushes, 147 yards
- CAR – Jonathan Stewart – 5 rushes, 31 yards

Top receivers

- PIT – Antonio Brown – 10 receptions, 90 yards, 2 TD
- CAR – Kelvin Benjamin – 8 receptions, 115 yards, TD

==== Week 4: at Baltimore Ravens ====
Week Four: Carolina Panthers at Baltimore Ravens – Game summary

Quarter	1	2	3	4	Total
Panthers	0	7	3	0	10
Ravens	0	21	7	10	38

at M&T Bank Stadium, Baltimore, Maryland

- Date: September 28
- Game time: 1:00 p.m. EDT
- Game weather: 78 °F (26 °C), sunny
- Game attendance: 71,218
- Referee: Craig Wrolstad
- TV announcers (CBS): Greg Gumbel, Trent Green and Evan Washburn
- Recap, Gamebook

Game information

First quarter

- No scoring plays.

Second quarter

- BAL – Steve Smith Sr. 61-yard pass from Joe Flacco (Justin Tucker kick), 13:12. Ravens 7–0. Drive: 5 plays, 80 yards, 2:30.
- CAR – Kelvin Benjamin 28-yard pass from Cam Newton (Graham Gano kick), 8:35. Tied 7–7. Drive: 10 plays, 80 yards, 4:37.
- BAL – Justin Forsett 11-yard run (Justin Tucker kick), 5:22. Ravens 14–7. Drive: 8 plays, 80 yards, 3:13.
- BAL – Steve Smith Sr. 21-yard pass from Joe Flacco (Justin Tucker kick), 1:53. Ravens 21–7. Drive: 7 plays, 68 yards, 2:36.

Third quarter

- BAL – Torrey Smith 24-yard pass from Joe Flacco (Justin Tucker kick), 9:51. Ravens 28–7. Drive: 10 plays, 80 yards, 5:09.
- CAR – Graham Gano 38-yard field goal, 3:30. Ravens 28–10. Drive: 12 plays, 64 yards, 6:21.

Fourth quarter

- BAL – Lorenzo Taliaferro 1-yard run (Justin Tucker kick), 11:34. Ravens 35–10. Drive: 12 plays, 80 yards, 6:56.
- BAL – Justin Tucker 38-yard field goal, 3:33. Ravens 38–10. Drive: 9 plays, 37 yards, 5:50.

Top passers

- CAR – Cam Newton – 14/25, 197 yards, TD
- BAL – Joe Flacco – 22/31, 327 yards, 3 TD

Top rushers

- CAR – DeAngelo Williams – 11 rushes, 34 yards
- BAL – Justin Forsett – 14 rushes, 66 yards, TD

Top receivers

- CAR – Jerricho Cotchery – 5 receptions, 80 yards
- BAL – Steve Smith Sr. – 7 receptions, 139 yards, 2 TD

This game marked the first time WR Steve Smith Sr. played against his former team after being released in the offseason.

==== Week 5: vs. Chicago Bears ====
Week Five: Chicago Bears at Carolina Panthers – Game summary

Quarter	1	2	3	4	Total
Bears	14	7	3	0	24
Panthers	7	7	7	10	31

at Bank of America Stadium, Charlotte, North Carolina

- Date: October 5
- Game time: 1:00 p.m. EDT
- Game weather: 60 °F (16 °C), sunny
- Game attendance: 73,659
- Referee: Tony Corrente
- TV announcers (Fox): Thom Brennaman, David Diehl and Laura Okmin
- Recap, Gamebook

Game information

First quarter

- CAR – Corey Brown 79-yard punt return (Graham Gano kick), 10:56. Panthers 7–0.
- CHI – Matt Forte 10-yard pass from Jay Cutler (Robbie Gould kick), 4:31. Tied 7–7. Drive: 3 plays, 28 yards, 0:47.
- CHI – Jay Cutler 10-yard run (Robbie Gould kick), 2:13. Bears 14–7. Drive: 3 plays, 13 yards, 1:21.

Second quarter

- CHI – Alshon Jeffery 25-yard pass from Jay Cutler (Robbie Gould kick), 10:51. Bears 21–7. Drive: 8 plays, 68 yards, 5:20.
- CAR – Greg Olsen 9-yard pass from Cam Newton (Graham Gano kick), 0:12. Bears 21–14. Drive: 7 plays, 75 yards, 1:39.

Third quarter

- CAR – Chris Ogbonnaya 1-yard run (Graham Gano kick), 7:16. Tied 21–21. Drive: 9 plays, 86 yards, 4:00.
- CHI – Robbie Gould 45-yard field goal, 2:38. Bears 24–21. Drive: 8 plays, 53 yards, 4:38.

Fourth quarter

- CAR – Graham Gano 44-yard field goal, 4:29. Tied 24–24. Drive: 4 plays, 6 yards, 1:27.
- CAR – Greg Olsen 6-yard pass from Cam Newton (Graham Gano kick), 2:18. Panthers 31–24. Drive: 6 plays, 23 yards, 2:00.

Top passers

- CHI – Jay Cutler – 28/36, 289 yards, 2 TD, 2 INT
- CAR – Cam Newton – 19/35, 255 yards, 2 TD, INT

Top rushers

- CHI – Matt Forte – 17 rushes, 61 yards
- CAR – Darrin Reaves – 10 rushes, 36 yards

Top receivers

- CHI – Matt Forte – 12 receptions, 105 yards, TD
- CAR – Greg Olsen – 6 receptions, 72 yards, 2 TD

==== Week 6: at Cincinnati Bengals ====
Week Six: Carolina Panthers at Cincinnati Bengals – Game summary

Quarter	1	2	3	4	OT	Total
Panthers	7	3	14	10	3	37
Bengals	0	17	0	17	3	37

at Paul Brown Stadium, Cincinnati, Ohio

- Date: October 12
- Game time: 1:00 p.m. EDT
- Game weather: 60 °F (16 °C), cloudy
- Game attendance: 57,053
- Referee: Carl Cheffers
- TV announcers (Fox): Chris Myers, Ronde Barber and Jennifer Hale
- Recap, Gamebook

Game information

First quarter

- CAR – Kelvin Benjamin 3-yard pass from Cam Newton (Graham Gano kick), 5:45. Panthers 7–0. Drive: 15 plays, 86 yards, 9:16.

Second quarter

- CIN – Brandon Tate 5-yard pass from Andy Dalton (Mike Nugent kick), 14:21. Tied 7–7. Drive: 14 plays, 69 yards, 6:29.
- CIN – Giovani Bernard 89-yard run (Mike Nugent kick), 11:50. Bengals 14–7. Drive: 1 play, 89 yards, 0:15.
- CAR – Graham Gano 39-yard field goal, 6:20. Bengals 14–10. Drive: 11 plays, 61 yards, 5:30.
- CIN – Mike Nugent 44-yard field goal, 0:03. Bengals 17–10. Drive: 12 plays, 54 yards, 6:17.

Third quarter

- CAR – Fozzy Whittaker 4-yard run (Graham Gano kick), 9:07. Tied 17–17. Drive: 2 plays, 10 yards, 0:42.
- CAR – Cam Newton 12-yard run (Graham Gano kick), 3:54. Panthers 24–17. Drive: 6 plays, 77 yards, 2:11.

Fourth quarter

- CIN – Mohamed Sanu 34-yard pass from Andy Dalton (Mike Nugent kick), 11:38. Tied 24–24. Drive: 6 plays, 71 yards, 3:11.
- CAR – Greg Olsen 13-yard pass from Cam Newton (Graham Gano kick), 4:50. Panthers 31–24. Drive: 12 plays, 80 yards, 6:48.
- CIN – Jeremy Hill 3-yard run (Mike Nugent kick), 4:32. Tied 31–31. Drive: 1 play, 3 yards, 0:18.
- CIN – Mike Nugent 38-yard field goal, 2:11. Bengals 34–31. Drive: 4 plays, 4 yards, 1:11.
- CAR – Graham Gano 44-yard field goal, 0:00. Tied 34–34. Drive: 12 plays, 54 yards, 2:11.

Overtime

- CIN – Mike Nugent 42-yard field goal, 8:35. Bengals 37–34. Drive: 13 plays, 56 yards, 6:25.
- CAR – Graham Gano 36-yard field goal, 2:19. Tied 37–37. Drive: 12 plays, 60 yards, 6:16.

Top passers

- CAR – Cam Newton – 29/46, 284 yards, 2 TD, INT
- CIN – Andy Dalton – 33/43, 323 yards, 2 TD, 2 INT

Top rushers

- CAR – Cam Newton – 17 rushes, 107 yards, TD
- CIN – Giovani Bernard – 18 rushes, 137 yards, TD

Top receivers

- CAR – Greg Olsen – 6 receptions, 62 yards, TD
- CIN – Mohamed Sanu – 10 receptions, 120 yards, TD

Both teams went back and forth scoring in a shootout. This would be the highest-scoring overtime tie in NFL history until 2025, as well as the first tie in franchise history.

==== Week 7: at Green Bay Packers ====
Week Seven: Carolina Panthers at Green Bay Packers – Game summary

Quarter	1	2	3	4	Total
Panthers	0	3	0	14	17
Packers	21	7	10	0	38

at Lambeau Field, Green Bay, Wisconsin

- Date: October 19
- Game time: 1:00 p.m. EDT/12:00 p.m. CDT
- Game weather: 48 °F (9 °C), cloudy
- Game attendance: 78,106
- Referee: Jeff Triplette
- TV announcers (Fox): Sam Rosen, John Lynch and Pam Oliver
- Recap, Gamebook

Game information

First quarter

- GB – Jordy Nelson 59-yard pass from Aaron Rodgers (Mason Crosby kick), 11:51. Packers 7–0. Drive: 6 plays, 80 yards, 3:09.
- GB – Eddie Lacy 5-yard run (Mason Crosby kick), 5:53. Packers 14–0. Drive: 9 plays, 56 yards, 4:10.
- GB – James Starks 13-yard run (Mason Crosby kick), 2:07. Packers 21–0. Drive: 5 plays, 62 yards, 2:08.

Second quarter

- GB – Randall Cobb 3-yard pass from Aaron Rodgers (Mason Crosby kick), 4:07. Packers 28–0. Drive: 9 plays, 94 yards, 5:57.
- CAR – Graham Gano 33-yard field goal, 0:00. Packers 28–3. Drive: 8 plays, 65 yards, 1:51.

Third quarter

- GB – Davante Adams 21-yard pass from Aaron Rodgers (Mason Crosby kick), 10:20. Packers 35–3. Drive: 4 plays, 58 yards, 1:54.
- GB – Mason Crosby 34-yard field goal, 0:08. Packers 38–3. Drive: 5 plays, 33 yards, 2:10.

Fourth quarter

- CAR – Kelvin Benjamin 13-yard pass from Cam Newton (Graham Gano kick), 9:39. Packers 38–10. Drive: 11 plays, 80 yards, 4:29.
- CAR – Brenton Bersin 1-yard pass from Derek Anderson (Graham Gano kick), 1:24. Packers 38–17. Drive: 7 plays, 44 yards, 2:57.

Top passers

- CAR – Cam Newton – 17/31, 205 yards, TD, INT
- GB – Aaron Rodgers – 19/22, 255 yards, 3 TD

Top rushers

- CAR – Jonathan Stewart – 13 rushes, 50 yards
- GB – Eddie Lacy – 12 rushes, 63 yards, TD

Top receivers

- CAR – Greg Olsen – 8 receptions, 105 yards
- GB – Randall Cobb – 6 receptions, 121 yards, TD

==== Week 8: vs. Seattle Seahawks ====
Week Eight: Seattle Seahawks at Carolina Panthers – Game summary

Quarter	1	2	3	4	Total
Seahawks	0	3	3	7	13
Panthers	3	3	0	3	9

at Bank of America Stadium, Charlotte, North Carolina

- Date: October 26
- Game time: 1:00 p.m. EDT
- Game weather: 77 °F (25 °C), sunny
- Game attendance: 74,042
- Referee: Walt Coleman
- TV announcers (CBS (Note: The kickoff time and/or network were changed after the initial schedule release as a result of flexible scheduling. The kickoff time and/or network were changed after the initial schedule release as a result of flexible scheduling.)): Ian Eagle, Dan Fouts and Jenny Dell
- Recap, Gamebook

Game information

First quarter

- CAR – Graham Gano 31-yard field goal, 6:21. Panthers 3–0. Drive: 11 plays, 58 yards, 6:26.

Second quarter

- CAR – Graham Gano 26-yard field goal, 13:23. Panthers 6–0. Drive: 12 plays, 46 yards, 6:21.
- SEA – Stephen Hauschka 58-yard field goal, 11:00. Panthers 6–3. Drive: 5 plays, 13 yards, 2:23.

Third quarter

- SEA – Stephen Hauschka 29-yard field goal, 7:13. Tied 6–6. Drive: 12 plays, 29 yards, 6:00.

Fourth quarter

- CAR – Graham Gano 46-yard field goal, 4:37. Panthers 9–6. Drive: 9 plays, 64 yards, 4:56.
- SEA – Luke Willson 23-yard pass from Russell Wilson (Stephen Hauschka kick), 0:47. Seahawks 13–9. Drive: 9 plays, 80 yards, 3:50.

Top passers

- SEA – Russell Wilson – 20/32, 199 yards, TD, INT
- CAR – Cam Newton – 12/22, 171 yards, INT

Top rushers

- SEA – Marshawn Lynch – 14 rushes, 62 yards
- CAR – Jonathan Stewart – 16 rushes, 79 yards

Top receivers

- SEA – Doug Baldwin – 6 receptions, 61 yards
- CAR – Kelvin Benjamin – 4 receptions, 94 yards

==== Week 9: vs. New Orleans Saints ====
Week Nine: New Orleans Saints at Carolina Panthers – Game summary

Quarter	1	2	3	4	Total
Saints	0	14	7	7	28
Panthers	0	0	7	3	10

at Bank of America Stadium, Charlotte, North Carolina

- Date: October 30
- Game time: 8:25 p.m. EDT
- Game weather: 58 °F (14 °C), clear
- Game attendance: 73,663
- Referee: Clete Blakeman
- TV announcers (NFLN (Note: Simulcast on WBTV.)): Jim Nantz, Phil Simms and Tracy Wolfson
- Recap, Gamebook

Game information

First quarter

- No scoring plays.

Second quarter

- NO – Mark Ingram 3-yard run (Shayne Graham kick), 2:38. Saints 7–0. Drive: 2 plays, 4 yards, 0:42.
- NO – Jimmy Graham 1-yard pass from Drew Brees (Shayne Graham kick), 0:03. Saints 14–0. Drive: 10 plays, 85 yards, 1:46.

Third quarter

- CAR – Cam Newton 10-yard run (Graham Gano kick), 10:14. Saints 14–7. Drive: 10 plays, 81 yards, 4:46.
- NO – Drew Brees 1-yard run (Shayne Graham kick), 4:04. Saints 21–7. Drive: 14 plays, 80 yards, 6:10.

Fourth quarter

- CAR – Graham Gano 31-yard field goal, 12:57. Saints 21–10. Drive: 8 plays, 54 yards, 2:53.
- NO – Mark Ingram 3-yard run (Shayne Graham kick), 5:30. Saints 28–10. Drive: 13 plays, 80 yards, 7:27.

Top passers

- NO – Drew Brees – 24/34, 297 yards, TD, INT
- CAR – Cam Newton – 10/28, 151 yards, INT

Top rushers

- NO – Mark Ingram – 30 rushes, 100 yards, 2 TD
- CAR – Jonathan Stewart – 8 rushes, 46 yards

Top receivers

- NO – Jimmy Graham – 7 receptions, 83 yards, TD
- CAR – Jerricho Cotchery – 5 receptions, 59 yards

==== Week 10: at Philadelphia Eagles ====
Week Ten: Carolina Panthers at Philadelphia Eagles – Game summary

Quarter	1	2	3	4	Total
Panthers	7	0	0	14	21
Eagles	17	14	7	7	45

at Lincoln Financial Field, Philadelphia, Pennsylvania

- Date: November 10
- Game time: 8:30 p.m. EST
- Game weather: 52 °F (11 °C), mostly clear
- Game attendance: 69,596
- Referee: Gene Steratore
- TV announcers (ESPN (Note: Simulcast on WSOC-TV.)): Mike Tirico, Jon Gruden and Lisa Salters
- Recap, Gamebook

Game information

First quarter

- PHI – Cody Parkey 39-yard field goal, 13:25. Eagles 3–0. Drive: 4 plays, 1 yard, 0:40.
- PHI – Darren Sproles 8-yard run (Cody Parkey kick), 11:25. Eagles 10–0. Drive: 5 plays, 43 yards, 1:45.
- CAR – Jonathan Stewart 1-yard run (Graham Gano kick), 6:00. Eagles 10–7. Drive: 11 plays, 80 yards, 5:25.
- PHI – Darren Sproles 65-yard punt return (Cody Parkey kick), 3:29. Eagles 17–7.

Second quarter

- PHI – Jordan Matthews 13-yard pass from Mark Sanchez (Cody Parkey kick), 11:33. Eagles 24–7. Drive: 10 plays, 91 yards, 3:35.
- PHI – Bradley Fletcher 34-yard interception return (Cody Parkey kick), 2:13. Eagles 31–7.

Third quarter

- PHI – LeSean McCoy 1-yard run (Cody Parkey kick), 7:40. Eagles 38–7. Drive: 2 plays, 30 yards, 0:17.

Fourth quarter

- PHI – Jordan Matthews 18-yard pass from Mark Sanchez (Cody Parkey kick), 11:43. Eagles 45–7. Drive: 7 plays, 67 yards, 2:41.
- CAR – Kelvin Benjamin 21-yard pass from Cam Newton (Graham Gano kick), 9:05. Eagles 45–14. Drive: 6 plays, 64 yards, 2:38.
- CAR – Kelvin Benjamin 40-yard pass from Cam Newton (Graham Gano kick), 5:30. Eagles 45–21. Drive: 6 plays, 65 yards, 2:22.

Top passers

- CAR – Cam Newton – 25/40, 306 yards, 2 TD, 3 INT
- PHI – Mark Sanchez – 20/37, 332 yards, 2 TD

Top rushers

- CAR – Jonathan Stewart – 11 rushes, 36 yards, TD
- PHI – LeSean McCoy – 12 rushes, 19 yards, TD

Top receivers

- CAR – Greg Olsen – 6 receptions, 119 yards
- PHI – Jordan Matthews – 7 receptions, 138 yards, 2 TD

==== Week 11: vs. Atlanta Falcons ====
Week Eleven: Atlanta Falcons at Carolina Panthers – Game summary

Quarter	1	2	3	4	Total
Falcons	0	6	10	3	19
Panthers	0	3	0	14	17

at Bank of America Stadium, Charlotte, North Carolina

- Date: November 16
- Game time: 1:00 p.m. EST
- Game weather: 48 °F (9 °C), cloudy
- Game attendance: 73,314
- Referee: Walt Anderson
- TV announcers (Fox): Dick Stockton, Kirk Morrison and Kristina Pink
- Recap, Gamebook

Game information

First quarter

- No scoring plays.

Second quarter

- CAR – Graham Gano 23-yard field goal, 14:57. Panthers 3–0. Drive: 17 plays, 83 yards, 9:05.
- ATL – Matt Bryant 34-yard field goal, 9:26. Tied 3–3. Drive: 13 plays, 64 yards, 5:31.
- ATL – Matt Bryant 42-yard field goal, 0:02. Falcons 6–3. Drive: 10 plays, 48 yards, 1:33.

Third quarter

- ATL – Matt Bryant 26-yard field goal, 12:07. Falcons 9–3. Drive: 4 plays, 6 yards, 1:28.
- ATL – Roddy White 2-yard pass from Matt Ryan (Matt Bryant kick), 6:34. Falcons 16–3. Drive: 8 plays, 55 yards, 3:49.

Fourth quarter

- CAR – Kelvin Benjamin 22-yard pass from Cam Newton (Graham Gano kick), 9:12. Falcons 16–10. Drive: 5 plays, 71 yards, 1:50.
- CAR – Corey Brown 47-yard pass from Cam Newton (Graham Gano kick), 6:20. Panthers 17–16. Drive: 2 plays, 69 yards, 0:41.
- ATL – Matt Bryant 44-yard field goal, 2:08. Falcons 19–17. Drive: 12 plays, 54 yards, 4:12.

Top passers

- ATL – Matt Ryan – 31/45, 268 yards, TD
- CAR – Cam Newton – 23/37, 292 yards, 2 TD, 2 INT

Top rushers

- ATL – Steven Jackson – 17 rushes, 41 yards
- CAR – DeAngelo Williams – 10 rushes, 41 yards

Top receivers

- ATL – Roddy White – 8 receptions, 75 yards, TD
- CAR – Kelvin Benjamin – 9 receptions, 109 yards, TD

==== Week 13: at Minnesota Vikings ====
Week Thirteen: Carolina Panthers at Minnesota Vikings – Game summary

Quarter	1	2	3	4	Total
Panthers	3	3	7	0	13
Vikings	14	14	0	3	31

at TCF Bank Stadium, Minneapolis, Minnesota

- Date: November 30
- Game time: 1:00 p.m. EST/12:00 p.m. CST
- Game weather: 12 °F (−11 °C), sunny
- Game attendance: 52,016
- Referee: Brad Allen
- TV announcers (Fox): Chris Myers, Ronde Barber and Jennifer Hale
- Recap, Gamebook

Game information

First quarter

- MIN – Kyle Rudolph 4-yard pass from Teddy Bridgewater (Blair Walsh kick), 9:41. Vikings 7–0. Drive: 6 plays, 45 yards, 3:07.
- MIN – Adam Thielen 30-yard return of blocked punt (Blair Walsh kick), 7:00. Vikings 14–0.
- CAR – Graham Gano 30-yard field goal, 0:37. Vikings 14–3. Drive: 14 plays, 68 yards, 6:23.

Second quarter

- MIN – Everson Griffen 43-yard return of blocked punt (Blair Walsh kick), 9:35. Vikings 21–3.
- CAR – Graham Gano 35-yard field goal, 3:28. Vikings 21–6. Drive: 12 plays, 63 yards, 6:07.
- MIN – Greg Jennings 17-yard pass from Teddy Bridgewater (Blair Walsh kick), 0:16. Vikings 28–6. Drive: 11 plays, 80 yards, 3:12.

Third quarter

- CAR – Corey Brown 32-yard pass from Cam Newton (Graham Gano kick), 9:15. Vikings 28–13. Drive: 8 plays, 80 yards, 4:13.

Fourth quarter

- MIN – Blair Walsh 39-yard field goal, 8:55. Vikings 31–13. Drive: 6 plays, 19 yards, 3:25.

Top passers

- CAR – Cam Newton – 18/35, 194 yards, TD, INT
- MIN – Teddy Bridgewater – 15/21, 138 yards, 2 TD

Top rushers

- CAR – Jonathan Stewart – 12 rushes, 85 yards
- MIN – Matt Asiata – 14 rushes, 52 yards

Top receivers

- CAR – Greg Olsen – 5 receptions, 59 yards
- MIN – Greg Jennings – 5 receptions, 45 yards, TD

==== Week 14: at New Orleans Saints ====
Week Fourteen: Carolina Panthers at New Orleans Saints – Game summary

Quarter	1	2	3	4	Total
Panthers	17	7	14	3	41
Saints	0	3	0	7	10

at Mercedes-Benz Superdome, New Orleans, Louisiana

- Date: December 7
- Game time: 1:00 p.m. EST/12:00 p.m. CST
- Game weather: Played indoors (dome stadium)
- Game attendance: 73,006
- Referee: Walt Coleman
- TV announcers (Fox): Kenny Albert, Daryl Johnston and Tony Siragusa
- Recap, Gamebook

Game information

First quarter

- CAR – Kelvin Benjamin 9-yard pass from Cam Newton (Graham Gano kick), 11:42. Panthers 7–0. Drive: 7 plays, 80 yards, 3:18.
- CAR – Graham Gano 37-yard field goal, 9:57. Panthers 10–0. Drive: 4 plays, 6 yards, 1:02.
- CAR – Cam Newton 2-yard run, 6:41. Panthers 17–0. Drive: 6 plays, 60 yards, 3:11.

Second quarter

- NO – Shayne Graham 37-yard field goal, 13:19. Panthers 17–3. Drive: 7 plays, 34 yards, 3:28.
- CAR – Greg Olsen 16-yard pass from Cam Newton (Graham Gano kick), 2:14. Panthers 24–3. Drive: 12 plays, 68 yards, 4:46.

Third quarter

- CAR – Jonathan Stewart 69-yard run (Graham Gano kick), 13:59. Panthers 31–3. Drive: 1 play, 69 yards, 0:11.
- CAR – Fozzy Whittaker 26-yard pass from Cam Newton (Graham Gano kick), 5:13. Panthers 38–3. Drive: 9 plays, 86 yards, 5:49.

Fourth quarter

- CAR – Graham Gano 41-yard field goal, 14:10. Panthers 41–3. Drive: 11 plays, 38 yards, 5:05.
- NO – Benjamin Watson 7-yard pass from Drew Brees (Shayne Graham kick), 5:29. Panthers 41–10. Drive: 12 plays, 83 yards, 3:31.

Top passers

- CAR – Cam Newton – 21/33, 226 yards, 3 TD
- NO – Drew Brees – 29/45, 235 yards, TD, INT

Top rushers

- CAR – Jonathan Stewart – 20 rushes, 155 yards, TD
- NO – Mark Ingram – 10 rushes, 43 yards

Top receivers

- CAR – Greg Olsen – 10 receptions, 72 yards, TD
- NO – Marques Colston – 5 receptions, 72 yards

==== Week 15: vs. Tampa Bay Buccaneers ====
Week Fifteen: Tampa Bay Buccaneers at Carolina Panthers – Game summary

Quarter	1	2	3	4	Total
Buccaneers	7	3	0	7	17
Panthers	6	3	7	3	19

at Bank of America Stadium, Charlotte, North Carolina

- Date: December 14
- Game time: 1:00 p.m. EST
- Game weather: 60 °F (16 °C), sunny
- Game attendance: 72,842
- Referee: Ron Torbert
- TV announcers (Fox): Dick Stockton, Kirk Morrison and Kristina Pink
- Recap, Gamebook

Game information

First quarter

- CAR – Graham Gano 29-yard field goal, 8:19. Panthers 3–0. Drive: 13 plays, 73 yards, 6:41.
- TB – Mike Evans 8-yard pass from Josh McCown (Patrick Murray kick), 5:54. Buccaneers 7–3. Drive: 5 plays, 80 yards, 2:25.
- CAR – Graham Gano 49-yard field goal, 1:14. Buccaneers 7–6. Drive: 10 plays, 51 yards, 4:41.

Second quarter

- CAR – Graham Gano 38-yard field goal, 1:10. Panthers 9–7. Drive: 15 plays, 68 yards, 6:03.
- TB – Patrick Murray 48-yard field goal, 0:02. Buccaneers 10–9. Drive: 7 plays, 50 yards, 1:08.

Third quarter

- CAR – Jerricho Cotchery 2-yard pass from Derek Anderson (Graham Gano kick), 13:53. Panthers 16–10. Drive: 2 plays, 4 yards, 0:48.

Fourth quarter

- CAR – Graham Gano 45-yard field goal, 8:31. Panthers 19–10. Drive: 12 plays, 46 yards, 6:24.
- TB – Josh McCown 16-yard run (Patrick Murray kick), 3:11. Panthers 19–17. Drive: 11 plays, 80 yards, 5:20.

Top passers

- TB – Josh McCown – 13/28, 154 yards, TD, INT
- CAR – Derek Anderson – 25/40, 277 yards, TD

Top rushers

- TB – Doug Martin – 14 rushes, 96 yards
- CAR – Jonathan Stewart – 22 rushes, 75 yards

Top receivers

- TB – Vincent Jackson – 6 receptions, 70 yards
- CAR – Greg Olsen – 10 receptions, 110 yards

Derek Anderson made his second start this season as Cam Newton had injured his back in a car accident earlier that week.

==== Week 16: vs. Cleveland Browns ====
Week Sixteen: Cleveland Browns at Carolina Panthers – Game summary

Quarter	1	2	3	4	Total
Browns	0	3	3	7	13
Panthers	3	7	0	7	17

at Bank of America Stadium, Charlotte, North Carolina

- Date: December 21
- Game time: 1:00 p.m. EST
- Game weather: 48 °F (9 °C), mostly cloudy
- Game attendance: 73,810
- Referee: Ed Hochuli
- TV announcers (CBS): Tom McCarthy and Adam Archuleta
- Recap, Gamebook

Game information

First quarter

- CAR – Graham Gano 23-yard field goal, 2:47. Panthers 3–0. Drive: 14 plays, 77 yards, 6:25.

Second quarter

- CLE – Garrett Hartley 43-yard field goal, 13:25. Tied 3–3. Drive: 10 plays, 55 yards, 4:22.
- CAR – Cam Newton 2-yard run (Graham Gano kick), 1:55. Panthers 10–3. Drive: 12 plays, 57 yards, 6:26.

Third quarter

- CLE – Garrett Hartley 31-yard field goal, 3:14. Panthers 10–6. Drive: 9 plays, 43 yards, 5:06.

Fourth quarter

- CLE – Jordan Cameron 81-yard pass from Brian Hoyer (Garrett Hartley kick), 9:59. Browns 13–10. Drive: 3 plays, 85 yards, 1:23.
- CAR – Jonathan Stewart 9-yard pass from Cam Newton (Graham Gano kick), 7:07. Panthers 17–13. Drive: 7 plays, 66 yards, 2:52.

Top passers

- CLE – Brian Hoyer – 7/13, 134 yards, TD, INT
- CAR – Cam Newton – 18/31, 201 yards, TD, INT

Top rushers

- CLE – Isaiah Crowell – 16 rushes, 55 yards
- CAR – Jonathan Stewart – 24 rushes, 122 yards

Top receivers

- CLE – Jordan Cameron – 3 receptions, 88 yards, TD
- CAR – Kelvin Benjamin – 5 receptions, 47 yards

As of 2026, this remains their last win over Cleveland.

==== Week 17: at Atlanta Falcons ====
Week Seventeen: Carolina Panthers at Atlanta Falcons – Game summary

Quarter	1	2	3	4	Total
Panthers	10	14	10	0	34
Falcons	3	0	0	0	3

at Georgia Dome, Atlanta, Georgia

- Date: December 28
- Game time: 4:25 p.m. EST
- Game weather: Played indoors (dome stadium)
- Game attendance: 71,015
- Referee: Bill Leavy
- TV announcers (CBS): Jim Nantz, Phil Simms and Tracy Wolfson
- Recap, Gamebook

Game information

First quarter

- CAR – Graham Gano 21-yard field goal, 7:50. Panthers 3–0. Drive: 12 plays, 77 yards, 7:10.
- CAR – Ed Dickson 5-yard pass from Cam Newton (Graham Gano kick), 0:04. Panthers 10–0. Drive: 10 plays, 87 yards, 4:45.

Second quarter

- ATL – Matt Bryant 21-yard field goal, 10:36. Panthers 10–3. Drive: 10 plays, 35 yards, 4:28.
- CAR – Roman Harper 31-yard interception return (Graham Gano kick), 4:18. Panthers 17–3.
- CAR – Cam Newton 4-yard run (Graham Gano kick), 1:47. Panthers 24–3. Drive: 1 play, 4 yards, 0:07.

Third quarter

- CAR – Graham Gano 48-yard field goal, 8:43. Panthers 27–3. Drive: 8 plays, 29 yards, 4:35.
- CAR – Tre Boston 84-yard interception return (Graham Gano kick), 0:07. Panthers 34–3.

Fourth quarter

- No scoring plays.

Top passers

- CAR – Cam Newton – 10/16, 114 yards, TD
- ATL – Matt Ryan – 29/47, 260 yards, 2 INT

Top rushers

- CAR – Cam Newton – 6 rushes, 51 yards, TD
- ATL – Jacquizz Rodgers – 9 rushes, 44 yards

Top receivers

- CAR – Corey Brown – 1 reception, 28 yards
- ATL – Roddy White – 8 receptions, 104 yards

=== Postseason ===
==== NFC Wild Card Playoffs: vs. (5) Arizona Cardinals ====
NFC Wild Card Playoffs: (5) Arizona Cardinals at (4) Carolina Panthers – Game summary

Quarter	1	2	3	4	Total
Cardinals	0	14	0	2	16
Panthers	10	3	14	0	27

at Bank of America Stadium, Charlotte, North Carolina

- Date: January 3, 2015
- Game time: 4:35 p.m. EST
- Game weather: 51 °F (11 °C), rain
- Game attendance: 71,849
- Referee: Ed Hochuli
- TV announcers (ESPN (Note: Simulcast on WJZY.)): Mike Tirico, Jon Gruden and Lisa Salters
- Recap, Gamebook

Game information

First quarter

- CAR – Graham Gano 47-yard field goal, 11:27. Panthers 3–0. Drive: 7 plays, 19 yards, 2:03.
- CAR – Jonathan Stewart 13-yard run (Graham Gano kick), 5:21. Panthers 10–0. Drive: 8 plays, 57 yards, 3:51.

Second quarter

- ARI – Darren Fells 1-yard pass from Ryan Lindley (Chandler Catanzaro kick), 14:56. Panthers 10–7. Drive: 6 plays, 30 yards, 2:15.
- ARI – Marion Grice 1-yard run (Chandler Catanzaro kick), 2:50. Cardinals 14–10. Drive: 4 plays, 17 yards, 2:04.
- CAR – Graham Gano 39-yard field goal, 0:15. Cardinals 14–13. Drive: 9 plays, 95 yards, 2:35.

Third quarter

- CAR – Fozzy Whittaker 39-yard pass from Cam Newton (Graham Gano kick), 5:36. Panthers 20–14. Drive: 1 play, 39 yards, 0:14.
- CAR – Mike Tolbert 1-yard pass from Cam Newton (Graham Gano kick), 4:04. Panthers 27–14. Drive: 3 plays, 3 yards, 1:24.

Fourth quarter

- ARI – Brad Nortman tackled in end zone by Justin Bethel, 0:03. Panthers 27–16.

Top passers

- ARI – Ryan Lindley – 16/28, 82 yards, TD, 2 INT
- CAR – Cam Newton – 18/32, 198 yards, 2 TD, INT

Top rushers

- ARI – Kerwynn Williams – 10 rushes, 23 yards
- CAR – Jonathan Stewart – 24 rushes, 123 yards, TD

Top receivers

- ARI – John Brown – 4 receptions, 34 yards
- CAR – Fozzy Whittaker – 1 reception, 39 yards, TD

==== NFC Divisional Playoffs: at (1) Seattle Seahawks ====
NFC Divisional Playoffs: (4) Carolina Panthers at (1) Seattle Seahawks – Game summary

Quarter	1	2	3	4	Total
Panthers	0	10	0	7	17
Seahawks	7	7	0	17	31

at CenturyLink Field, Seattle, Washington

- Date: January 10, 2015
- Game time: 8:15 p.m. EST/5:15 p.m. PST
- Game weather: 48 °F (9 °C), cloudy
- Game attendance: 68,524
- Referee: Terry McAulay
- TV announcers (Fox): Kevin Burkhardt, John Lynch and Pam Oliver
- Recap, Gamebook

Game information

1st Quarter

- SEA – Doug Baldwin 16-yard pass from Russell Wilson (Steven Hauschka kick), 0:56. Seahawks 7–0. Drive: 4 plays, 28 yards, 1:26.

2nd Quarter

- CAR – Kelvin Benjamin 7-yard pass from Cam Newton (Graham Gano kick), 7:44. Tied 7–7. Drive: 14 plays, 79 yards, 8:12.
- SEA – Jermaine Kearse 63-yard pass from Russell Wilson (Steven Hauschka kick), 4:54. Seahawks 14–7. Drive: 5 plays, 77 yards, 2:50.
- CAR – Graham Gano 35-yard field goal, 0:00. Seahawks 14–10. Drive: 13 plays, 62 yards, 4:54.

3rd Quarter

- No scoring

4th Quarter

- SEA – Steven Hauschka 37-yard field goal, 14:55. Seahawks 17–10. Drive: 12 plays, 69 yards, 6:32.
- SEA – Luke Willson 25-yard pass from Russell Wilson (Steven Hauschka kick), 10:26. Seahawks 24–10. Drive: 6 plays, 58 yards, 2:27.
- SEA – Kam Chancellor 90-yard interception return (Steven Hauschka kick), 5:55. Seahawks 31–10.
- CAR – Kelvin Benjamin 15-yard pass from Cam Newton (Graham Gano kick), 2:34. Seahawks 31–17. Drive: 8 plays, 83 yards, 3:21.

Leading passers

- CAR – Cam Newton – 23/36, 246 yards, 2 TD, 2 INT
- SEA – Russell Wilson – 15/22, 268 yards, 3 TD

Leading rushers

- CAR – Jonathan Stewart – 13 rushes, 70 yards
- SEA – Marshawn Lynch – 14 rushes, 59 yards

Leading receivers

- CAR – Kelvin Benjamin – 7 rec, 75 yards, 2 TD
- SEA – Jermaine Kearse – 3 rec, 129 yards, TD

== Standings ==
=== Division ===
NFC South
	W	L	T	PCT	DIV	CONF	PF	PA	STK
^{(4)} Carolina Panthers	7	8	1	.469	4–2	6–6	339	374	W4
New Orleans Saints	7	9	0	.438	3–3	6–6	401	424	W1
Atlanta Falcons	6	10	0	.375	5–1	6–6	381	417	L1
Tampa Bay Buccaneers	2	14	0	.125	0–6	1–11	277	410	L6

=== Conference ===
NFC
#	Team	Division	W	L	T	PCT	DIV	CONF	SOS	SOV	STK
Division leaders
1 (Note: Seattle, Green Bay and Dallas were ranked in seeds 1–3 based on conference record.)	Seattle Seahawks	West	12	4	0	.750	5–1	10–2	.525	.513	W6
2	Green Bay Packers	North	12	4	0	.750	5–1	9–3	.482	.440	W2
3	Dallas Cowboys	East	12	4	0	.750	4–2	8–4	.445	.422	W4
4	Carolina Panthers	South	7	8	1	.469	4–2	6–6	.490	.357	W4
Wild Cards
5 (Note: Arizona defeated Detroit head-to-head (Week 11, 14–6).)	Arizona Cardinals	West	11	5	0	.688	3–3	8–4	.523	.477	L2
6	Detroit Lions	North	11	5	0	.688	5–1	9–3	.471	.392	L1
Did not qualify for the postseason
7	Philadelphia Eagles	East	10	6	0	.625	4–2	6–6	.490	.416	W1
8	San Francisco 49ers	West	8	8	0	.500	2–4	7–5	.527	.508	W1
9 (Note: New Orleans defeated Minnesota head-to-head (Week 3, 20–9).)	New Orleans Saints	South	7	9	0	.438	3–3	6–6	.486	.415	W1
10	Minnesota Vikings	North	7	9	0	.438	1–5	6–6	.475	.308	W1
11 (Note: The NY Giants defeated both Atlanta and St. Louis head-to-head (Atlanta: Week 5, 30–20; St. Louis: Week 16, 37–27), while Atlanta finished ahead of St. Louis based on conference record.)	New York Giants	East	6	10	0	.375	2–4	4–8	.512	.323	L1
12	Atlanta Falcons	South	6	10	0	.375	5–1	6–6	.482	.380	L1
13	St. Louis Rams	West	6	10	0	.375	2–4	4–8	.531	.427	L3
14	Chicago Bears	North	5	11	0	.313	1–5	4–8	.529	.338	L5
15	Washington Redskins	East	4	12	0	.250	2–4	2–10	.496	.422	L1
16	Tampa Bay Buccaneers	South	2	14	0	.125	0–6	1–11	.486	.469	L6
Tiebreakers (Note: When breaking ties for three or more teams under the NFL's rules, they are first broken within divisions, then comparing only the highest-ranked remaining team from each division.)
