= List of NFL longest winning streaks =

This is a list of the longest winning streaks in National Football League (NFL) history. The list includes streaks that started at the end of one season and carried over into the following season.

The Indianapolis Colts hold the record for the longest regular season winning streak in NFL history, at 23 games. They won 9 straight games to finish the 2008 season and started the 2009 season with 14 straight wins. The New England Patriots hold the record for the longest postseason winning streak in NFL history, with 10 straight playoff wins between 2001 and 2005—although the team did miss the playoffs in 2002.

== Key ==
^	Denotes streaks that contained perfect regular seasons
	Denotes streaks that are currently in progress
*	Denotes season in which team won championship

== Streaks ==
=== Regular season ===
This list contains only the top streaks consisting entirely of regular-season games.

Rank	Games	Team	Season(s)	Season record(s)	Date	Score	Opponent	Date	Score	Opponent
Rank	Games	Team	Season(s)	Season record(s)	Beginning (first victory)			End (first defeat or tie)		
1	23 (9 + 14)	Indianapolis Colts	2008; 2009	12–4; 14–2	November 2, 2008	18–15	New England Patriots	December 27, 2009	15–29	New York Jets
2	21 (3 + 16 + 2)	New England Patriots^	2006; 2007; 2008	12–4; 16–0; 11–5	December 17, 2006	40–7	Houston Texans	September 21, 2008	13–38	Miami Dolphins
3 (tie)	18 (12 + 6)	New England Patriots	2003*; 2004*	14–2; 14–2	October 5, 2003	38–30	Tennessee Titans	October 31, 2004	20–34	Pittsburgh Steelers
3 (tie)	18 (4 + 14)	Carolina Panthers	2014; 2015	7–8–1; 15–1	December 7, 2014	41–10	New Orleans Saints	December 27, 2015	13–20	Atlanta Falcons
5 (tie)	17 (4 + 13)	Chicago Bears^	1933*; 1934	10–2–1; 13–0	November 26, 1933	17–14	Portsmouth Spartans	September 22, 1935	0–7	Green Bay Packers
5 (tie)	17 (11 + 6)	Denver Broncos	2012; 2013	13–3; 13–3	October 15, 2012	35–24	San Diego Chargers	October 20, 2013	33–39	Indianapolis Colts
7 (tie)	16 (5 + 11)	Chicago Bears^	1941*; 1942	10–1; 11–0	November 9, 1941	31–13	Cleveland Rams	September 26, 1943	21–21	Green Bay Packers
7 (tie)	16 (2 + 14)	Cleveland Browns^	1947*; 1948*	12–1–1; 14–0	November 27, 1947	27–17	Los Angeles Dons	September 5, 1949	28–28	Buffalo Bills
7 (tie)	16 (1 + 14 + 1)	Miami Dolphins^	1971; 1972*; 1973*	10–3–1; 14–0; 12–2	December 19, 1971	27–6	Green Bay Packers	September 23, 1973	7–12	Oakland Raiders
7 (tie)	16 (5 + 11)	Miami Dolphins	1983; 1984	12–4; 14–2	November 20, 1983	37–0	Baltimore Colts	November 18, 1984	28–34	San Diego Chargers
7 (tie)	16 (14 + 2)	Pittsburgh Steelers	2004; 2005*	15–1; 11–5	September 26, 2004	13–3	Miami Dolphins	September 25, 2005	20–23	New England Patriots

=== Playoffs ===
This list contains only streaks consisting entirely of postseason games.

Rank	Games	Team	Season(s)	Date	Score	Opponent	Date	Score	Opponent
Rank	Games	Team	Season(s)	Beginning (first victory)			End (first defeat)		
1	10 (3 + 3 + 3 + 1)	New England Patriots	2001*; 2003*; 2004*; 2005	January 19, 2002	16–13	Oakland Raiders	January 14, 2006	13–27	Denver Broncos
2 (tie)	9 (1 + 1 + 2 + 2 + 3)	Green Bay Packers	1961*; 1962*; 1965*; 1966*; 1967*	December 31, 1961	37–0	New York Giants	December 24, 1972	3–16	Washington Redskins
2 (tie)	9 (3 + 4 + 2)	Kansas City Chiefs	2022*; 2023*; 2024	January 21, 2023	27–20	Jacksonville Jaguars	February 9, 2025	22–40	Philadelphia Eagles
4 (tie)	7 (1 + 1 + 1 + 2 + 2)	Cleveland Browns^	1946*; 1947*; 1948*; 1949*; 1950*	December 22, 1946	14–9	New York Yankees	December 23, 1951	17–24	Los Angeles Rams
4 (tie)	7 (3 + 3 + 1)	Pittsburgh Steelers	1974*; 1975*; 1976	December 22, 1974	32–14	Buffalo Bills	December 26, 1976	7–24	Oakland Raiders
4 (tie)	7 (3 + 3 + 1)	San Francisco 49ers	1988*; 1989*; 1990	January 1, 1989	34–9	Minnesota Vikings	January 20, 1991	13–15	New York Giants
4 (tie)	7 (3 + 3 + 1)	Dallas Cowboys	1992*; 1993*; 1994	January 10, 1993	34–10	Philadelphia Eagles	January 15, 1995	28–38	San Francisco 49ers
4 (tie)	7 (4 + 3)	Denver Broncos	1997*; 1998*	December 27, 1997	42–17	Jacksonville Jaguars	December 27, 2000	3–21	Baltimore Ravens
9 (tie)	6 (3 + 3)	Miami Dolphins^	1972*; 1973*	December 24, 1972	20–14	Cleveland Browns	December 21, 1974	26–28	Oakland Raiders
9 (tie)	6 (3 + 3)	Pittsburgh Steelers	1978*; 1979*	December 30, 1978	33–10	Denver Broncos	January 9, 1983	28–31	San Diego Chargers
9 (tie)	6 (4 + 2)	Washington Redskins	1982*; 1983	January 8, 1983	31–7	Detroit Lions	January 22, 1984	9–38	Los Angeles Raiders

== See also ==
- List of National Football League longest losing streaks
- List of NFL franchise post-season streaks
- List of National Football League records (team)
