= Kimario McFadden =

American gridiron football player (born 1991)

No. 33
- Position: Safety/Linebacker

Personal information
- Born: April 13, 1991 (age 35); Jonesboro, Georgia, U.S.
- Listed height: 5 ft 11 in (1.80 m)
- Listed weight: 210 lb (95 kg)

Career information
- High school: Mundy's Mill (Jonesboro)
- College: South Carolina State
- NFL draft: 2014: undrafted

Career history
- Atlanta Falcons (2014)*; Tampa Bay Buccaneers (2014)*; Atlanta Falcons (2014)*; Carolina Panthers (2014–2015)*; Tampa Bay Buccaneers (2015); Toronto Argonauts (2017)*
- * Offseason or practice squad member only

Career NFL statistics
- Total tackles: 2
- Stats at Pro Football Reference

Kimario McFadden (born April 13, 1991) is an American former professional football player who was a safety in the National Football League (NFL). He played college football for the South Carolina State Bulldogs. He signed as an undrafted free agent with the Atlanta Falcons in 2014.

== Professional career ==
=== Atlanta Falcons (first stint) ===
After going unselected in the 2014 NFL draft, McFadden signed with the Atlanta Falcons on May 12, 2014. He was waived on August 29, 2014.

=== Tampa Bay Buccaneers (first stint) ===
McFadden signed to the Tampa Bay Buccaneers' practice squad on September 1, 2014. McFadden was terminated from the practice squad on September 22, 2014.

=== Atlanta Falcons (second stint) ===
McFadden signed to the Falcons' practice squad on September 30, 2014. He was terminated from the practice squad on October 30, 2014.

=== Carolina Panthers ===
McFadden signed to the Carolina Panthers' practice squad on December 2, 2014. He signed a futures contract with the Carolina Panthers on January 13, 2015. On May 21, 2015, he was waived.

=== Tampa Bay Buccaneers (second stint) ===
On July 29, 2015, he was signed by the Buccaneers. On August 30, he was waived. On November 10, the Buccaneers re-signed McFadden. On November 30, McFadden was waived by the Buccaneers. On December 2, the Buccaneers signed McFadden to the practice squad. On December 30, was signed to the active roster.

On April 29, 2016, McFadden was waived. On August 28, 2016, McFadden was again waived by the Buccaneers. Two days later, he was resigned. On September 5, he was cut.

=== Toronto Argonauts ===
On June 1, 2017, McFadden signed with the Toronto Argonauts of the Canadian Football League. He was released on June 17, 2017.
