= List of NFL longest losing streaks =

This article contains two lists:

- The longest losing streaks in the regular season in NFL history
- The longest losing streaks in the postseason in NFL history

The Chicago Cardinals have the longest regular season losing streak, losing 29 consecutive games from 1942 through 1945. The Tampa Bay Buccaneers have the longest losing streak since the 1970 AFL–NFL merger, losing the first 26 games in franchise history in 1976 and 1977. The Detroit Lions hold the record for the longest postseason losing streak, dropping nine consecutive playoff games between 1991 and 2016.

== Key ==
^	Denotes streaks that occurred before the AFL–NFL merger (1970 season)
	Denotes streaks that are currently in progress

== Streaks ==
=== Regular season ===
Rank	Games	Team	Season(s)	Season record(s)	Date	Score	Opponent	Date	Score	Opponent
Rank	Games	Team	Season(s)	Season record(s)	Beginning (first defeat)			End (first victory or tie)		
1	29 (6+10+10+3)	Chicago Cardinals^	1942; 1943; 1944 (Note: In 1944, the Chicago Cardinals and Pittsburgh Steelers combined rosters and competed as Card-Pitt due to the loss of players to World War II military service.); 1945	3–8; 0–10; 0–10; 1–9	October 25, 1942	3–7	Cleveland Rams	October 14, 1945	16–7	Chicago Bears
2	26 (14+12)	Tampa Bay Buccaneers	1976; 1977	0–14; 2–12	September 12, 1976	0–20	Houston Oilers	December 11, 1977	33–14	New Orleans Saints
3	20 (15+5)	Jacksonville Jaguars	2020; 2021	1–15; 3–14	September 20, 2020	30–33	Tennessee Titans	October 17, 2021	23–20	Miami Dolphins
4 (tie)	19 (6+13)	Oakland Raiders^	1961; 1962	2–12; 1–13	November 11, 1961	12–23	New York Titans	December 16, 1962	20–0	Boston Patriots
4 (tie)	19 (1+16+2)	Detroit Lions	2007; 2008; 2009	7–9; 0–16; 2–14	December 30, 2007	13–34	Green Bay Packers	September 27, 2009	19–14	Washington Redskins
6	18 (11+7)	Houston Oilers	1972; 1973	1–13; 1–13	October 9, 1972	0–34	Oakland Raiders	November 4, 1973	31–27	Baltimore Colts
7 (tie)	17 (4+7+6)	Dayton Triangles^	1927; 1928; 1929	1–6–1; 0–7; 0–6	October 9, 1927	0–7	Chicago Cardinals	team folded after 1929 season		
7 (tie)	17 (8+9)	Washington Redskins^	1960; 1961	1–9–2; 1–12–1	October 30, 1960	10–31	Cleveland Browns	November 19, 1961	28–28	Dallas Cowboys
7 (tie)	17 (7+10)	Houston Oilers	1982; 1983	1–8; 2–14	November 21, 1982	10–24	Pittsburgh Steelers	November 13, 1983	27–17	Detroit Lions
7 (tie)	17 (10+7)	St. Louis Rams	2008; 2009	2–14; 1–15	October 26, 2008	16–23	New England Patriots	November 1, 2009	17–10	Detroit Lions
7 (tie)	17 (3+14)	Cleveland Browns	2015; 2016	3–13; 1–15	December 20, 2015	13–30	Seattle Seahawks	December 24, 2016	20–17	San Diego Chargers
7 (tie)	17 (1+16)	Cleveland Browns	2016; 2017 (Note: Losing streak carried into next season, but team won or tied their first game.)	1–15; 0–16	January 1, 2017	24–27	Pittsburgh Steelers	September 9, 2018	21–21	Pittsburgh Steelers
13 (tie)	16 (4+4+7+1)	Rochester Jeffersons^	1922; 1923; 1924; 1925	0–4–1; 0–4; 0–7; 0–6–1 (Note: Record against NFL opponents.)	October 15, 1922	0–7	Chicago Bears	October 4, 1925	0–0	Buffalo Bisons
13 (tie)	16 (13+3)	Pittsburgh Steelers^	1969; 1970	1–13; 5–9	September 28, 1969	27–41	Philadelphia Eagles	October 11, 1970	23–10	Buffalo Bills
13 (tie)	16 (3+13)	Miami Dolphins	2006; 2007	6–10; 1–15	December 17, 2006	0–21	Buffalo Bills	December 16, 2007	22–16	Baltimore Ravens
13 (tie)	16 (6+10)	Oakland Raiders	2013; 2014	4–12; 3–13	November 24, 2013	19–23	Tennessee Titans	November 20, 2014	24–20	Kansas City Chiefs
17 (tie)	15 (10+5)	Buffalo Bills	1970; 1971	3–10–1; 1–13	November 22, 1970	13–31	Chicago Bears	November 28, 1971	27–20	New England Patriots
17 (tie)	15	Carolina Panthers	2001	1–15	September 23, 2001	16–24	Atlanta Falcons	September 8, 2002	10–7	Baltimore Ravens
19 (tie)	14 (11+3)	Philadelphia Eagles^	1936; 1937	1–11; 2–8–1	September 20, 1936	3–26	Boston Redskins	September 26, 1937	6–6	Chicago Cardinals
19 (tie)	14 (1+10+3)	Pittsburgh Steelers^	1943 (Note: In 1943, the Pittsburgh Steelers and Philadelphia Eagles combined rosters and competed as the Steagles due to the loss of players to World War II military service.); 1944; 1945	5–4–1; 0–10; 2–8	December 5, 1943	28–38	Green Bay Packers	October 21, 1945	21–7	New York Giants
19 (tie)	14 (10+4)	Buffalo Bills	1976; 1977	2–12; 3–11	October 10, 1976	14–17	New York Jets	October 16, 1977	3–0	Atlanta Falcons
19 (tie)	14	New Orleans Saints	1980	1–15	September 7, 1980	23–26	San Francisco 49ers	December 14, 1980	21–20	New York Jets
19 (tie)	14	Baltimore Colts	1981	2–14	September 13, 1981	3–35	Buffalo Bills	December 20, 1981	23–21	New England Patriots
19 (tie)	14	New England Patriots	1990	1–15	September 23, 1990	7–41	Cincinnati Bengals	September 1, 1991	16–7	Indianapolis Colts
19 (tie)	14	Houston Texans	2013	2–14	September 22, 2013	9–30	Baltimore Ravens	September 7, 2014	17–6	Washington Redskins
19 (tie)	14 (10+4)	Chicago Bears	2022; 2023	3–14; 7–10	October 30, 2022	29–49	Dallas Cowboys	October 5, 2023	40–20	Washington Commanders

=== Playoffs ===
Rank	Games	Team	Seasons	Date	Score	Opponent	Date	Score	Opponent
Rank	Games	Team	Seasons	Beginning (first defeat)			End (first victory)		
1	9	Detroit Lions	1991, 1993, 1994, 1995, 1997, 1999, 2011, 2014, 2016	January 12, 1992	10–41	Washington Redskins	January 14, 2024	24–23	Los Angeles Rams
2 (tie)	8	Cincinnati Bengals	1990, 2005, 2009, 2011, 2012, 2013, 2014, 2015	January 13, 1991	10–20	Los Angeles Raiders	January 15, 2022	26–19	Las Vegas Raiders
2 (tie)	8	Kansas City Chiefs	1993, 1994, 1995, 1997, 2003, 2006, 2010, 2013	January 23, 1994	13–30	Buffalo Bills	January 9, 2016	30–0	Houston Texans
4	7	Pittsburgh Steelers	2016, 2017, 2020, 2021, 2023, 2024, 2025	January 22, 2017	17–36	New England Patriots			
5 (tie)	6	New York Giants^	1939, 1941, 1943, 1944, 1946, 1950	December 10, 1939	0–27	Green Bay Packers	December 30, 1956	47–7	Chicago Bears
5 (tie)	6	Cleveland Browns	1969, 1971, 1972, 1980, 1982, 1985	January 4, 1970	7–27	Minnesota Vikings	January 3, 1987	23–20	New York Jets
5 (tie)	6	Seattle Seahawks	1984, 1987, 1988, 1999, 2003, 2004	December 29, 1984	10–31	Miami Dolphins	January 14, 2006	20–10	Washington Redskins
5 (tie)	6	Minnesota Vikings	1988, 1989, 1992, 1993, 1994, 1996	January 1, 1989	9–34	San Francisco 49ers	December 27, 1997	23–22	New York Giants
5 (tie)	6	Buffalo Bills	1995, 1996, 1998, 1999, 2017, 2019	January 6, 1996	21–40	Pittsburgh Steelers	January 9, 2021	27–24	Indianapolis Colts
5 (tie)	6	Dallas Cowboys	1996, 1998, 1999, 2003, 2006, 2007	January 5, 1997	17–26	Carolina Panthers	January 9, 2010	34–14	Philadelphia Eagles
5 (tie)	6	Miami Dolphins	2000, 2001, 2008, 2016, 2022, 2023	January 6, 2001	0–27	Oakland Raiders			
12 (tie)	5	Los Angeles Rams^	1952, 1955, 1967, 1969, 1973	December 21, 1952	21–31	Detroit Lions	December 22, 1974	19–10	Washington Redskins
12 (tie)	5	New York Giants^	1958, 1959, 1961, 1962, 1963	December 28, 1958	17–23	Baltimore Colts	December 27, 1981	27–21	Philadelphia Eagles
12 (tie)	5	Baltimore/Indianapolis Colts	1971, 1975, 1976, 1977, 1987	January 2, 1972	0–21	Miami Dolphins	December 31, 1995	35–20	San Diego Chargers
12 (tie)	5	Denver Broncos	1977, 1978, 1979, 1983, 1984	January 15, 1978	10–27	Dallas Cowboys	January 4, 1987	22–17	New England Patriots
12 (tie)	5	Philadelphia Eagles	1980, 1981, 1988, 1989, 1990	January 25, 1981	10–27	Oakland Raiders	January 3, 1993	36–20	New Orleans Saints
12 (tie)	5	Indianapolis Colts	1995, 1996, 1999, 2000, 2002	January 14, 1996	16–20	Pittsburgh Steelers	January 4, 2004	41–10	Denver Broncos
12 (tie)	5	Washington Redskins/Football Team/Commanders	2005, 2007, 2012, 2015, 2020	January 14, 2006	10–20	Seattle Seahawks	January 12, 2025	23–20	Tampa Bay Buccaneers

== See also ==
- List of National Football League records (team)
- List of National Basketball Association longest losing streaks
- List of Major League Baseball longest losing streaks
- Losing streak
