= Colts–Texans rivalry =

National Football League rivalry

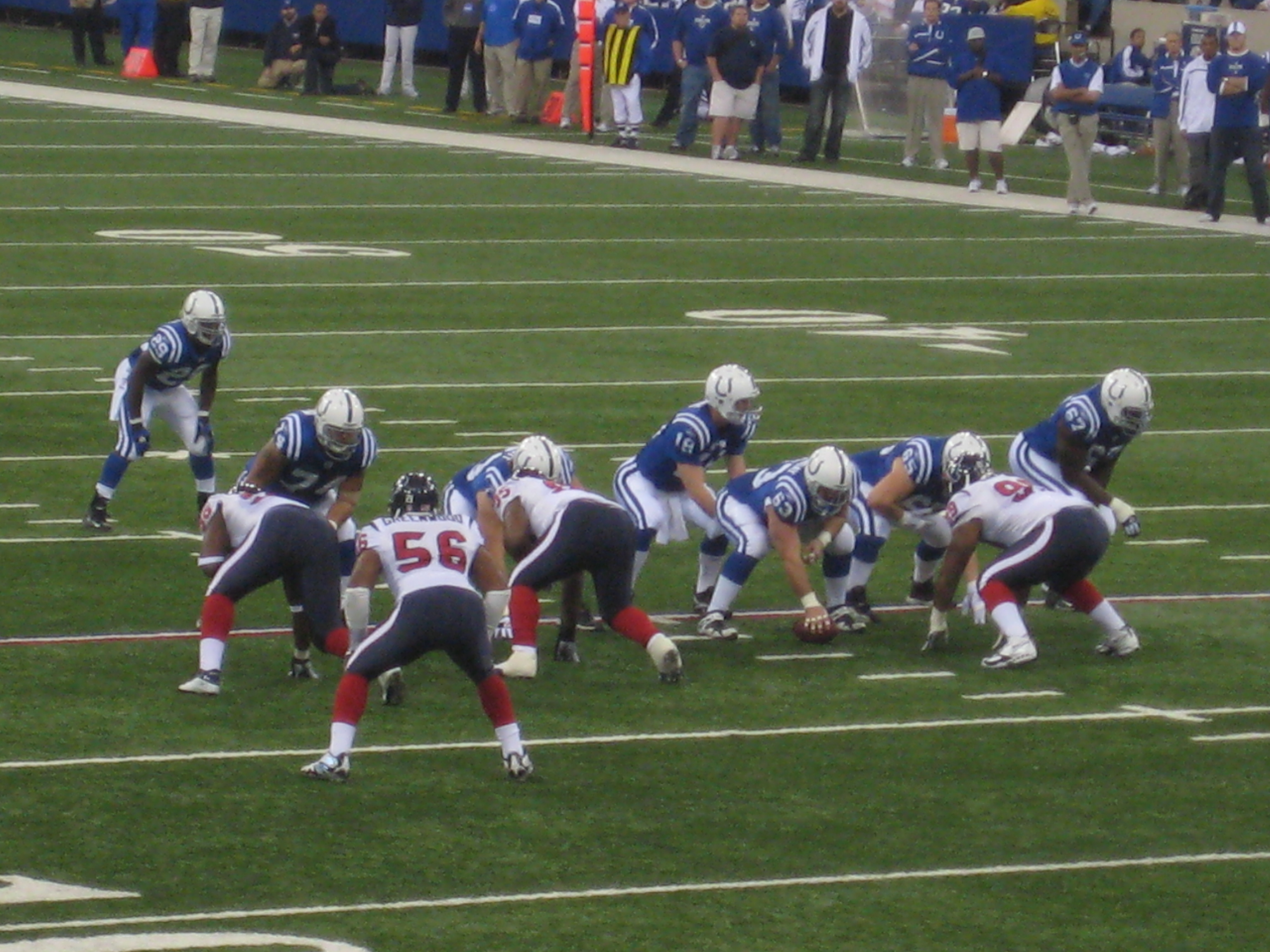
- Colts and Texans face off during the 2007 season.

- Indianapolis Colts Houston Texans
- Location: Indianapolis, Houston
- First meeting: September 22, 2002; Colts 23, Texans 3
- Latest meeting: November 19, 2026; Texans 26, Colts 3
- Next meeting: 2027
- Stadiums: Colts: Lucas Oil Stadium; Texans: NRG Stadium

Statistics
- Total meetings: 51
- All-time series: Colts: 34–16–1
- Regular season series: Colts: 33–16–1
- Postseason results: Colts: 1–0
- Largest victory: Colts: 49–14 (2004); Texans: 34–7 (2011)
- Most points scored: Colts: 49 (2004); Texans: 38 (2025)
- Longest win streak: Colts: 9 (2002–2006); Texans: 5 (2023–2025)
- Current win streak: Texans: 1 (2026–present)

Post-season history
- 2018 AFC Wild Card: Colts won: 21–7

The Colts–Texans rivalry is a National Football League (NFL) rivalry between the Indianapolis Colts and Houston Texans.

While being one of the newest rivalries in the NFL due to the Texans' formation in 2002 and the Colts' reallocation to the AFC South division that year, this rivalry has increased in intensity over the late 2010s despite being lopsided in favor of Indianapolis during the 2000s.

Though Colts fans generally view the Texans simply as a divisional opponent, many Texans fans see the Colts as their top rival due to their long period of dominance in the series. Indianapolis won the first nine games in the series as they were a perennial Super Bowl contender under quarterback Peyton Manning while the Texans struggled in their first years in the NFL, finally attaining their first winning season in 2009 and becoming a playoff contender through much of the 2010s. Since then, the Colts and Texans have often squared off for the top spot in their division.

The Colts lead the overall series, 34–16–1. The two teams have met once in the playoffs, with the Colts holding a 1–0 record.

== History ==
=== Formation of the Texans and the AFC South ===
Houston's first NFL Team was the Houston Oilers, who had moved to Memphis, Tennessee and later Nashville, Tennessee to become the Tennessee Titans. Bob McNair then spearheaded an effort to get the NFL to create an expansion team in Houston to replace the Oilers and even out the league's teams at 32. In 1999, the NFL officially awarded the 32nd franchise to McNair. The Texans began playing in 2002.

The formation of the Texans necessitated the reorganization of the league's divisions. The AFC South was created with the Texans joining as an expansion team, the Titans and Jacksonville Jaguars joining from the former AFC Central, and the Colts joining from the AFC East. The Titans and Jaguars were already rivals coming into the division, but the Colts and Texans would have to develop new divisional rivalries, as Indianapolis would leave behind its old rivalries from the AFC East.

=== 2002–2010 ===
Efforts for Houston to develop any heated rivalries in the 2000s were for naught, as the Texans were one of the NFL's bottom tier teams for much of their first nine years of playing. Indianapolis, on the other hand, was one of the NFL's powerhouses, featuring a stellar offense with quarterback Peyton Manning and receivers Marvin Harrison and Reggie Wayne. The Colts won the division 7 out of 9 years during this period and managed to make the playoffs each time.

The Colts and Texans first met on September 22, 2002, at Reliant Stadium in Houston, with Manning passing for 272 yards and two touchdowns while Texans rookie quarterback David Carr struggled, only amassing 99 yards, an interception, and a 47.3 passer rating as the Colts routed the Texans 23–3. The Colts wound up winning each of the first nine meetings between the teams, including a 49–14 victory at the RCA Dome in 2004, before Houston finally beat Indianapolis in week 16 of the 2006 season. Peyton Manning wound up having a 16–2 record against the Texans while with the Colts before being released and signing with the Denver Broncos after sitting out the 2011 season due to injury.

=== 2011–2020: Fight for AFC South supremacy ===
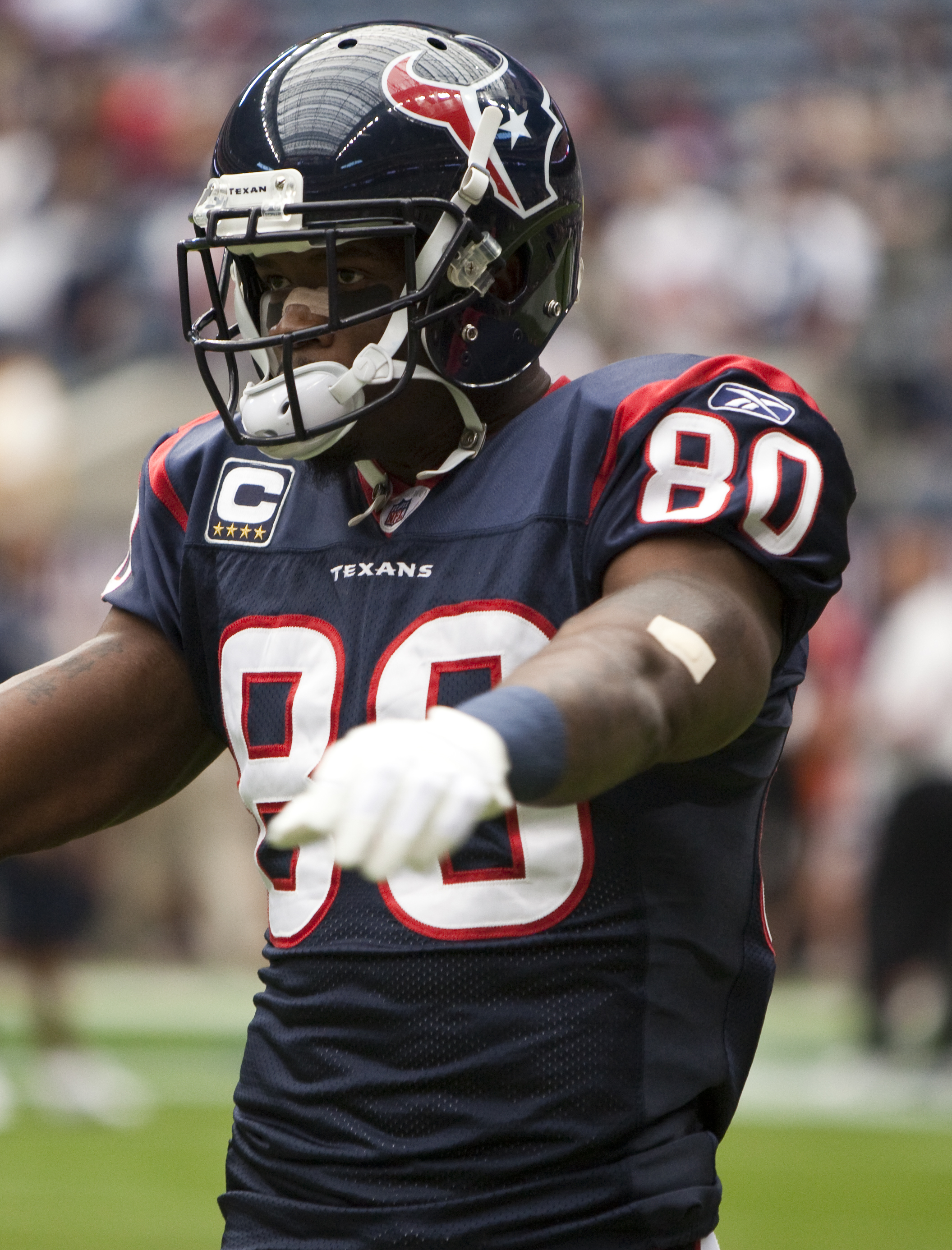
WR Andre Johnson was drafted by the Texans and went on to be their first Pro Football Hall of Fame Inductee. In 2015, he briefly joined the Indianapolis Colts for a single season.

The Texans routed the Manning-less Colts 34–7 in Houston in during opening day of the 2011 season, but were upset during the rematch in Indianapolis after Colts backup quarterback Dan Orlovsky completed a last-minute pass to Reggie Wayne for a touchdown, allowing Indianapolis to win 19–16. By the second game, both starting quarterbacks had been placed on injured reserve for the teams; in addition to Manning missing the whole season, Texans starter Matt Schaub had been sidelined with a Lisfranc injury, forcing rookie T. J. Yates to play in his stead. Nonetheless, the Colts suffered a 2–14 season without Manning, while the Texans still made the playoffs despite Schaub missing the last six games of the season, winning the AFC South for their first division title and playoff berth in franchise history.

The Colts then obtained the first overall pick in the 2012 NFL draft, which they then used to select Stanford quarterback and Houston native Andrew Luck to fill in the void left by Manning. The Texans dominated the Colts during Luck's first game in the rivalry, clinching a second consecutive divisional title with the 29–17 win in week 15 of 2012. However, this would be Indianapolis' last divisional loss until 2015, as the Colts would win the next six in a row against Houston. Houston broke the streak with a 16–10 win at Lucas Oil Stadium on October 8, 2015, which was the first time the Texans beat the Colts on the road, ironically with longtime Texans receiver Andre Johnson on the Colts. The following year, quarterback Brock Osweiler led the Texans to their first ever season sweep of the Colts in his only season with Houston.

Despite the growing animosity between the two teams, many players and executives from the Colts organization helped the Texans with donations and fundraising in the aftermath of Hurricane Harvey at the start of the 2017 season. After both teams struggled in 2017, they met in the playoffs for the first time the following season. Houston had won the division thanks to strong play from quarterback Deshaun Watson and the defense, while Indianapolis had overcome a 1–5 start, including a 37–34 overtime loss to the Texans in which new head coach Frank Reich called a failed fourth-down conversion that ultimately led to Houston's game-winning field goal, to clinch a wild-card berth at 10–6. The Colts won the game thanks to effective play from Luck, running back Marlon Mack, and their defense, keeping Houston scoreless until the fourth quarter with a 21–7 win. Prior to the playoff game, there had been some banter between Colts receiver T. Y. Hilton and several members of the Texans defensive secondary, as Hilton was called a "clown" after making disparaging comments about the Texans.

In 2019, the Texans and Colts were both in position to contend for the AFC South title, despite Indianapolis losing Andrew Luck to a sudden retirement prior to the season. The Colts won the first meeting 30–23 thanks to four touchdown passes from new quarterback Jacoby Brissett, but the Texans won 20–17 in week 12 thanks to two touchdown passes from Watson to receiver DeAndre Hopkins.

=== 2021–present ===
After a disappointing 2020 season for Houston, which included two close losses to the Colts and Hopkins being traded prior to the season, the Texans released star defensive end J. J. Watt per his request, leading to him joining Hopkins with the Arizona Cardinals, and Watson requested a trade before being accused by several women of sexual assault, leading to his deactivation throughout the 2021 season and eventual trade to the Cleveland Browns. While the Texans struggled again in 2021, the Colts, however, maintained a level of success playing with veteran quarterbacks Philip Rivers and Carson Wentz in 2020 and 2021, respectively.

The two teams met in week 1 of the 2022 season, with Matt Ryan now under center for Indianapolis and Davis Mills entering his second year as the Texans' starting quarterback. Houston jumped to a 20–3 lead in the third quarter, but Ryan led Indianapolis back to tie the game by the end of regulation. The game would end in a 20–20 tie as Colts kicker Rodrigo Blankenship missed the potential game-winning field goal, leading to his release after the game. This was the first tie in the series and the first tie in Texans history. The next meeting that year saw the Texans pull off a last minute rally to beat the Colts in an otherwise awful season of three wins.

The two teams each entered a new era in quarterbacks and coaches in 2023, with the Texans drafting C. J. Stroud and the Colts drafting Anthony Richardson. Indianapolis won the first game in Week 2 despite losing Richardson to injury, but the Texans won the winner-take-all rematch for both teams, in Week 18 by a final score of 23–19, eliminating Indianapolis to clinch their first playoff appearance in four years. They won the AFC South the next day after the Jacksonville Jaguars lost to their rival, the Tennessee Titans.

== Season-by-season results ==
Indianapolis Colts vs. Houston Texans Season-by-Season Results
2000s (Colts, 15–1)

Season	Season series	at Indianapolis Colts	at Houston Texans	Overall series	Notes
2002	Colts 2–0	Colts; 19–3	Colts; 23–3	Colts; 2–0	Texans join the National Football League (NFL) as an expansion team. During the NFL realignment, the Colts and Texans are placed in the newly formed AFC South, resulting in two meetings annually.
2003	Colts 2–0	Colts; 30–21	Colts; 20–17	Colts; 4–0	In Houston, Colts overcame a 17–3 fourth-quarter deficit.
2004	Colts 2–0	Colts; 49–14	Colts; 23–14	Colts; 6–0	In Indianapolis, Colts record their largest victory against the Texans with a 35–point differential and score their most points in a game against the Texans.
2005	Colts 2–0	Colts; 31–17	Colts; 38–20	Colts; 8–0	
2006	Tie 1–1	Colts; 43–24	Texans; 27–24	Colts; 9–1	Starting with their win, Colts go on a 13-game home winning streak. Colts win 9 straight meetings (2002–2006). Colts win Super Bowl XLI.
2007	Colts 2–0	Colts; 38–15	Colts; 30–24	Colts; 11–1	
2008	Colts 2–0	Colts; 33–27	Colts; 31–27	Colts; 13–1	In Houston, Colts overcame a 27–10 fourth-quarter deficit in the final 8 minutes.
2009	Colts 2–0	Colts; 20–17	Colts; 35–27	Colts; 15–1	In Houston, Colts overcame a 17–0 deficit. Colts lose Super Bowl XLIV.

2010s (Colts, 13–8)

Season	Season series	at Indianapolis Colts	at Houston Texans	Overall series	Notes
2010	Tie 1–1	Colts; 30–17	Texans; 34–24	Colts; 16–2	Final start in the series for Colts' QB Peyton Manning.
2011	Tie 1–1	Colts; 19–16	Texans; 34–7	Colts; 17–3	In Houston, Texans record their largest victory over the Colts with a 27–point differential.
2012	Tie 1–1	Colts; 28–16	Texans; 29–17	Colts; 18–4	Following their loss, the Colts would go on a 16–game winning streak in division play, an NFL record.
2013	Colts 2–0	Colts; 25–3	Colts; 27–24	Colts; 20–4	In Houston, Colts overcame a 24–6 third quarter deficit. Colts complete a sweep of the AFC South division.
2014	Colts 2–0	Colts; 17–10	Colts; 33–28	Colts; 22–4	Colts win 13 straight home meetings (2002–2014). Colts complete a sweep of the AFC South division.
2015	Tie 1–1	Texans; 16–10	Colts; 27–20	Colts; 23–5	Texans record their first road win against the Colts.
2016	Texans 2–0	Texans; 22–17	Texans; 26–23 (OT)	Colts; 23–7	In Houston, Texans overcame a 23–9 fourth-quarter deficit. First overtime result in the series. Texans record their first season series sweep against the Colts.
2017	Colts 2–0	Colts; 22–13	Colts; 20–14	Colts; 25–7	Only season from 2009 to 2019 that neither team won the AFC South.
2018	Tie 1–1	Texans; 37–34 (OT)	Colts; 24–21	Colts; 26–8	In Indianapolis, Texans capitalized on the Colts' failed fourth-down conversion in overtime to set up the game-winning field goal, snapping their nine-game losing streak. Later in the season, the Colts’ win snapped the Texans’ 9-game winning streak.
2018 Playoffs	Colts 1–0	—N/a	Colts; 21–7	Colts; 27–8	AFC Wild Card.
2019	Tie 1–1	Colts; 30–23	Texans; 20–17	Colts; 28–9	

2020s (Texans, 7–6–1)

Season	Season series	at Indianapolis Colts	at Houston Texans	Overall series	Notes
2020	Colts 2–0	Colts; 27–20	Colts; 26–20	Colts; 30–9	Both games ended with the Texans driving to tie or win in the closing seconds, yet the Colts forced fumbles to secure both victories.
2021	Colts 2–0	Colts; 31–3	Colts; 31–0	Colts; 32–9	
2022	Texans 1–0–1	Texans; 32–31	Tie; 20–20 (OT)	Colts; 32–10–1	In Houston, Colts overcame a 20–3 fourth-quarter deficit. In overtime, Colts' K Rodrigo Blankenship missed a potential game-winning 42-yard field goal and was waived two days later. The result marked the first tie in Texans franchise history.
2023	Tie 1–1	Texans; 23–19	Colts; 31–20	Colts; 33–11–1	Texans clinch a playoff berth and eliminate the Colts from playoff contention with their win.
2024	Texans 2–0	Texans; 29–27	Texans; 23–20	Colts; 33–13–1	
2025	Texans 2–0	Texans; 20–16	Texans; 38–30	Colts; 33–15–1	In Houston, Texans score their most points in a game against the Colts.
2026	Tie 1–1	Colts; 19–17	Texans; 26–3	Colts; 34–16–1	

Summary of Results

Season	Season series	at Indianapolis Colts	at Houston Texans	Notes
Regular season	Colts 33–16–1	Colts 18–7	Colts 15–9–1	
Postseason	Colts 1–0	no games	Colts 1–0	AFC Wild Card: 2018
Regular and postseason	Colts 34–16–1	Colts 18–7	Colts 16–9–1	

== Connections between the teams ==
- Andre Johnson
- Brian Hoyer
- Dan Orlovsky

== See also ==
- List of NFL rivalries
- AFC South
