= Colts–Titans rivalry =

National Football League rivalry

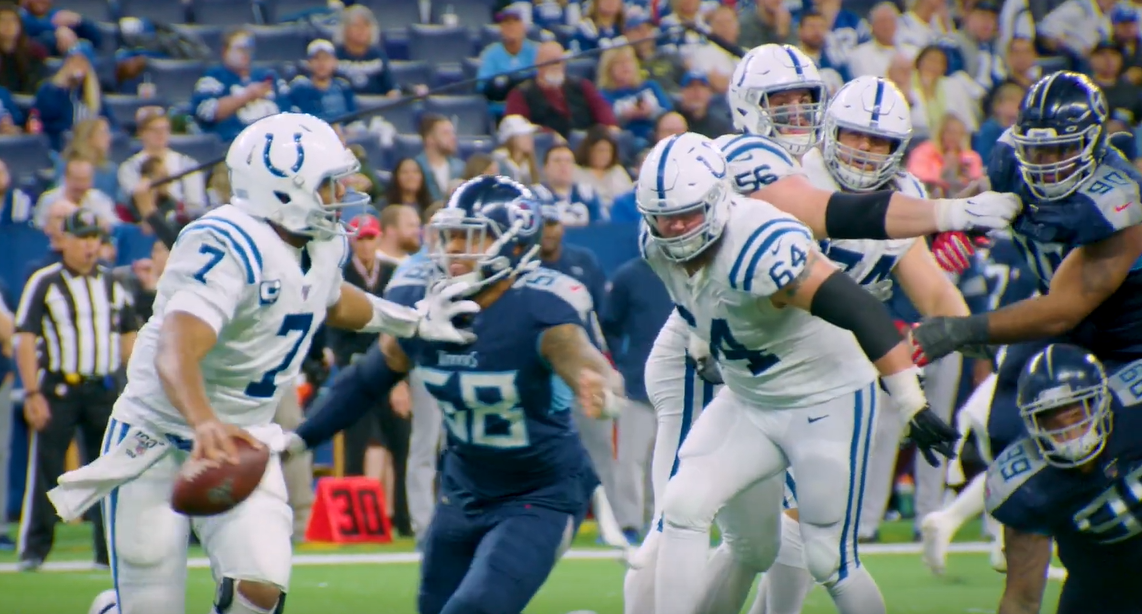
- Colts and Titans meet during the 2019 season.

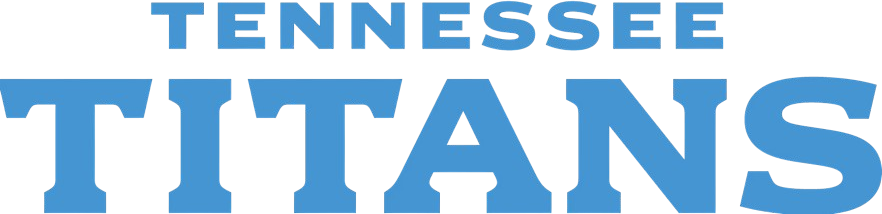
- Indianapolis Colts Tennessee Titans
- Location: Indianapolis, Nashville
- First meeting: October 11, 1970; Colts 24, Oilers 20
- Latest meeting: October 18, 2026; Titans 26, Colts 20
- Next meeting: December 20, 2026
- Stadiums: Colts: Lucas Oil Stadium; Titans: Nissan Stadium

Statistics
- Total meetings: 64
- All-time series: Colts: 41–23
- Regular season series: Colts: 41–22
- Postseason results: Titans: 1–0
- Largest victory: Colts: 35–3 (2005); Titans: 45–26 (2020)
- Most points scored: Colts: 51 (1987), (2004); Titans: 45 (2020)
- Longest win streak: Colts: 11 (2011–2016); Titans: 5 (2020–2022)
- Current win streak: Titans: 1 (2026–present)

Post-season history
- 1999 AFC Divisional: Titans won: 19–16

The Colts–Titans rivalry is a National Football League (NFL) rivalry between the Indianapolis Colts and Tennessee Titans.

During the 1960s, both teams competed in separate Leagues and went by different names, with the Colts identified as the Baltimore Colts and the Titans recognized as the Houston Oilers. Following a merger, the Colts and Oilers were both assigned to the American Football Conference, leading to sporadic matchups. Following a series of conflicting stadium situations, both teams relocated. The Colts made their move to Indianapolis, while the Oilers found their new home in Nashville, Tennessee, where they underwent a name change and became the Tennessee Titans. Following their first meeting in the playoffs, both teams were placed in the newly established AFC South during the 2002 season as part of a league realignment, leading to the development of a divisional rivalry. Throughout the 2000s, the Titans and Colts competed for the AFC South title, with the Titans occasionally becoming the only team in the AFC South to claim the title from the Colts. However, in recent years, the Colts have largely dominated the rivalry, thanks in part to the exceptional quarterback play of Peyton Manning and Andrew Luck. Nevertheless, the 2020s have seen both teams regain competitiveness, as they vie for the divisional title and a spot in the playoffs.

This rivalry is the longest-standing in the AFC South, with both teams competing against each other over 20 years prior to the inception of the Jaguars and Texans. Although it gained prominence during the AFC South matchups in the 2000s, it has recently been characterized by the Colts' supremacy over the Titans, highlighted by Luck's 11–0 record against them.

The Colts lead the overall series, 41–23. The two teams have met once in the playoffs, with the Titans winning.

== Background ==
The Indianapolis Colts were initially based in Baltimore, where they were referred to as the Baltimore Colts. They commenced their journey in the 1953 NFL season as part of the National Football League. Initially struggling to find success, the team experienced a turnaround with the addition of future Hall of Fame QB Johnny Unitas, winning three NFL championships in four appearances. However, they suffered a heartbreaking 16–7 to the New York Jets in Super Bowl III, marking one of the most surprising upsets in NFL history.

The Tennessee Titans were originally known as the Houston Oilers and were established as a team based in Houston. They began in the 1960 AFL season as a charter member of the American Football League. They quickly achieved success by securing the first two AFL Championships. Nevertheless, their victories have been limited in the years that followed.

Due to being in separate leagues, the two teams couldn't compete against each other. However, a significant development occurred on June 8, 1966, when the American Football League and National Football League decided to merge. This merger led to the formation of a combined league, preserving the name and logo of the "National Football League," and was planned to kick off in the 1970 season, resulting in a single league with two conferences. The Baltimore Colts, originally in the Western Conference of the NFL, agreed to move conferences to become part of the American Football Conference (AFC) alongside the Oilers. However, the Colts were placed in the AFC East division, whereas the Oilers were placed in the AFC Central division.

== History ==
=== Pre-AFC South history ===
The teams' first meeting took place on October 11, 1970 in Houston, a 24–20 Colts win in which Colts' quarterback Johnny Unitas connected with Roy Jefferson on the game-winning score with 46 seconds left.

On November 4, 1973, the Oilers recorded their first win of the series, a 31–27 victory over the Colts in Baltimore. This ended an 18–game losing streak, which was the third longest losing streak in NFL history at the time.

The early 1980s saw the both teams struggle. The Colts had one of the worst defenses in NFL history in the 1981 season. In the shortened players' strike 1982 NFL season, the Colts went winless, finishing with a 0–8–1 record. Meanwhile, the Oilers endured a 17–game losing streak from 1982–1983. Due to their poor records, the Colts and Oilers held the top two picks in the 1983 NFL draft, with the Colts being in position to draft future hall–of–famer QB John Elway. However, Elway refused to play for the Colts, citing concerns about his potential success with the team. He later expressed his desire to play for a West Coast team, ruling out the Oilers. In the end, the Colts drafted but traded Elway to the Denver Broncos, who would lead them to five Super Bowl appearances and two Super Bowl championships. The Oilers faced a similar issue when RB Eric Dickerson, a future Hall–of–Famer whom they intended to draft, declined to play for them. Worried about his intentions, the Oilers traded their second–overall pick to the Los Angeles Rams, who subsequently selected Dickerson. Dickerson set multiple rushing records during his time with the Rams. Notably, contract disputes with the Rams led to his trade to the Colts in the 1987 season.

In the 1983 season finale held in Baltimore, the Colts defeated the Oilers, 20–10, win over the Oilers, marking yet another disappointing season for both teams. Although this game went unnoticed at the time, it gained significance later on as it marked the final game played by the Colts as a Baltimore team, as they moved to Indianapolis the following offseason.

Both teams continued to struggle through the mid-1980s. However, the teams met on November 29, 1987 with both teams in the playoff picture. Notably, Eric Dickerson, who was drafted by the Oilers and opted not to play for them, was the starting running back for the Colts following his trade from the Los Angeles Rams. Dickerson rushed for 136 yards on 27 carries and two touchdowns in the first half as he contributed to a Colts dominating 51–27 win over the Oilers, their most points scored in a game against the Oilers/Titans franchise. With the result, both teams now had identical records of 6–5. Both teams returned to the playoffs after several-year absences. This marked the first time both teams qualified for the playoffs in the same season.

The two teams faced off in Week 1 of the 1988 season in Indianapolis, eager to build on the momentum they had gained by breaking their playoff droughts in the previous season. The teams were tied at 14–14 at halftime. In the 3rd quarter, Oilers quarterback Warren Moon suffered a shoulder injury, forcing backup QB Cody Carlson to take over for the remainder of the game. Despite the Colts being held scoreless for the rest of the game, the Oilers failed to capitalize on their opportunities, with kicker Tony Zendejas missing two field goals, including a 26–yard attempt with two minutes remaining in regulation. The game went into overtime, marking the first overtime game between the two teams. In overtime, Zendejas was able to redeem himself by kicking a 35–yard field goal, securing a 17–14 victory for the Oilers.

The Oilers defeated the Colts 24–10 during the 1990 season, in what turned out to be their final match-up in Houston. The 1994 season opener in Indianapolis saw the final matchup between the Colts and the Houston Oilers before their move to Tennessee. The Colts won 45–21. Rookie running back Marshall Faulk, a future hall of famer, made an impressive NFL debut with 143 rushing yards and three touchdowns. Without Warren Moon, the Oilers struggled significantly for the rest of the season, finishing with a losing record and missing the playoffs for the first time since the 1986 season.

Similar to Robert Irsay, Bud Adams expressed dissatisfaction with the Astrodome, citing its outdated facilities and limited seating capacity in comparison to other NFL stadiums, and pushed for the construction of a new stadium. Upon realizing that a new stadium was unlikely, Adams shifted his focus to Nashville, a city that was experiencing growth. On November 16, 1995, Adams made the decision to move the Oilers to Nashville, Tennessee. Poor attendance in Houston following the announcement led Adams to relocate the Oilers to Tennessee for the 1997 season, one year earlier than originally planned.

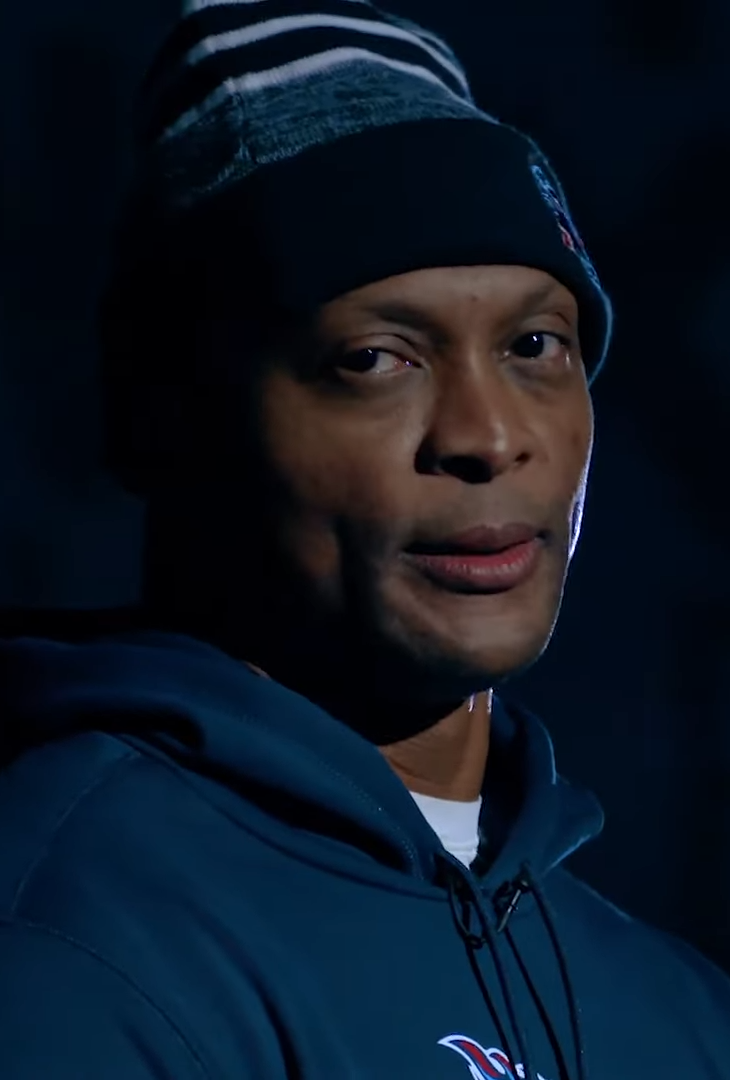
RB Eddie George rushed for 162 yards on 26 carries as he helped contribute to the Titans playoff win over the Colts. The highlight of the game was his 68–yard touchdown run, which proved to be the turning point in the game.

The teams' first and, to date, only postseason meeting was in the 1999 AFC Divisional Round. This marked the first meeting between the Colts and now-Titans since their 1997 move to Tennessee and the first postseason game of Peyton Manning's career. Despite the Colts being the #2 seed and having home advantage, the Titans went on to a 19–16 win. The Titans were led by Eddie George, who had 26 carries for 162 yards including a 68-yard touchdown run. The Titans went on to play in Super Bowl XXXIV, which they lost to the St. Louis Rams.

=== 2002–2011: Peyton Manning dominance ===
For the 2002 season, the NFL realigned each conference into four divisions with four teams each. The Colts and Titans were placed in the newly formed AFC South, resulting in two meetings annually. Initially, the NFL presented Miami Dolphins' owner Wayne Huizenga with the choice to relocate to the more geographically appropriate AFC South rather than the Colts. However, Huizenga opted to preserve the traditional AFL rivalries within the AFC East. As a result, the Colts and Titans became divisional opponents, meeting twice annually – once in Indianapolis and once in Nashville.

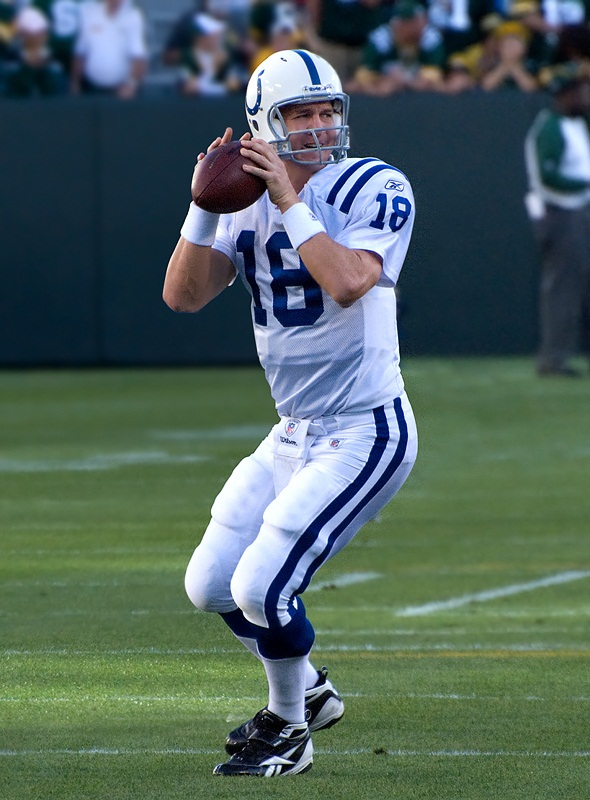
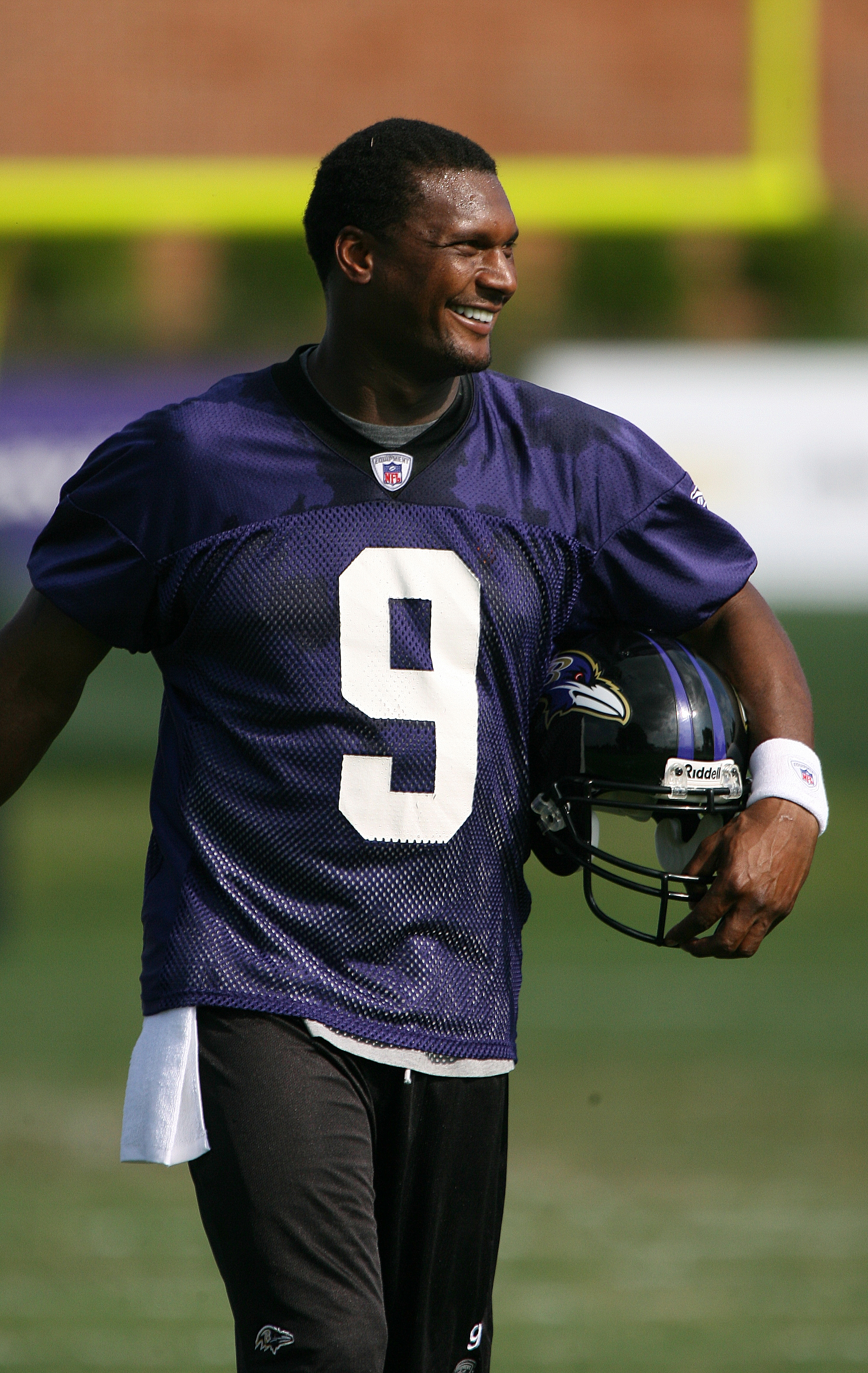
QB Peyton Manning (left) and QB Steve McNair (right) regularly clashed for the AFC South title, leading their teams to the postseason and Super Bowl appearances. They were both named co–winners of the MVP award in the 2003 season. After McNair's departure, Manning went on to dominate the rivalry for the Colts.

The first season for the Colts and Titans as division rivals saw the two teams vying for the AFC south championship. The two teams met in Nashville on December 8, with the Colts sitting at 8–4 and the Titans at 7–5, having already defeated the Colts earlier in the year. This marked the teams' first meeting in Tennessee. The Titans won the game 27–17 to sweep the head-to-head series and take the lead in the division. Tennessee ultimately won the inaugural AFC South title, while Indianapolis earned a wild card spot that year.

The Colts went on to win the next seven meetings between 2003 and 2006, as the Colts won the AFC South title each of these years. The winning streak was highlighted by a 35–3 Colts win in 2005, their largest margin of victory over the Oilers/Titans.

The Titans ended the Colts' winning streak on December 3, 2006, as the Titans came back from a 14–0 deficit to win 20–17, as kicker Rob Bironas hit a 60-yard game-winning field goal with 12 seconds remaining. This remains the longest field goal in Oilers/Titans franchise history. However, the Colts went on to win Super Bowl XLI following the season.

The two teams met in the final game of the 2007 season in Indianapolis. The Colts had already clinched their fifth straight AFC South title and the #2 seed in the conference, while with the Titans needed a win to clinch the final wild card spot. The Titans won 16–10, as the Colts resting many of their key players. It was also their last matchup at the RCA Dome. Both teams later suffered defeats to the San Diego Chargers in the playoffs.

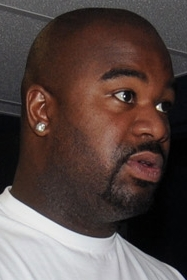
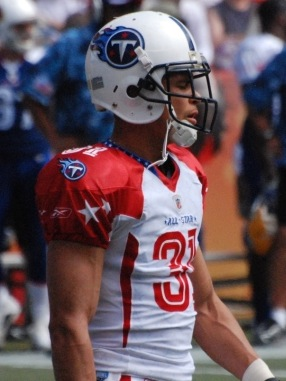
In the 2008 season, the Titans' top–ranked defense, led by pro bowlers Albert Haynesworth (left) and Cortland Finnegan (right), helped the team secure an AFC South title, ending the Colts' streak of five consecutive AFC South titles.

The Titans ended the Colts' five-season run as AFC South champions in 2008 by winning the division with a dominant 13–3 season. On October 27, the Titans defeated the Colts 31–21 in Nashville to improve to 7–0 on the season, which they ultimately started 10–0. The Colts fell to 4–4 following this loss, the Colts went unbeaten the remainder of the season to finish 12–4, including a 23–0 win over Tennessee in the season's final game, to secure a 12–4 record and the AFC's #5 seed.

The Colts extended their dominance into the 2009 season, starting 13–0 and extending their regular season winning 23 games, an NFL record that still stands. The Colts rode their winning streak to a 13–3 finish including a season sweep of the Titans. The Colts went on to play in Super Bowl XLIV, which they lost to the New Orleans Saints.

The Colts again swept the Titans in 2010, what would be Manning's final season with the team. During his tenure with the Colts, Manning achieved a passer rating of 102.2, throwing for 4,559 yards, 31 touchdowns, and 13 interceptions in the 18 games against the Titans. He ended with a 13–5 record against them, playing a pivotal role in the Colts' success and contributing to their dominance over the Titans.

Manning did not play in the 2011 following neck surgery. Entering their matchup against the Titans at Nashville on October 30, the Colts entered with a 0–7 record. The team's highly–ranked offense and defense from the previous season has declined. The Colts' luck did not improve in this game, with penalties and turnovers contributing to a 27–10 victory for the Titans.

The Colts started the season 0–13, including a loss in Nashville. However, the Colts ended their 13-game losing streak with a 27–13 win over the Titans. The Colts finished a league-worst 2–14 record, while the Titans’ 9–7 finish left them out of the playoffs. Had the Titans beaten the Colts, they would have qualified in the final wild card spot.

=== 2012–2018: Andrew Luck's perfect record ===
The Colts released Peyton Manning after the 2011 selection and selected Stanford quarterback Andrew Luck as the number one pick in the 2012 NFL draft. Manning became a free agent and garnered interest from several teams, including the Titans. However, Manning ended up signing with the Denver Broncos.

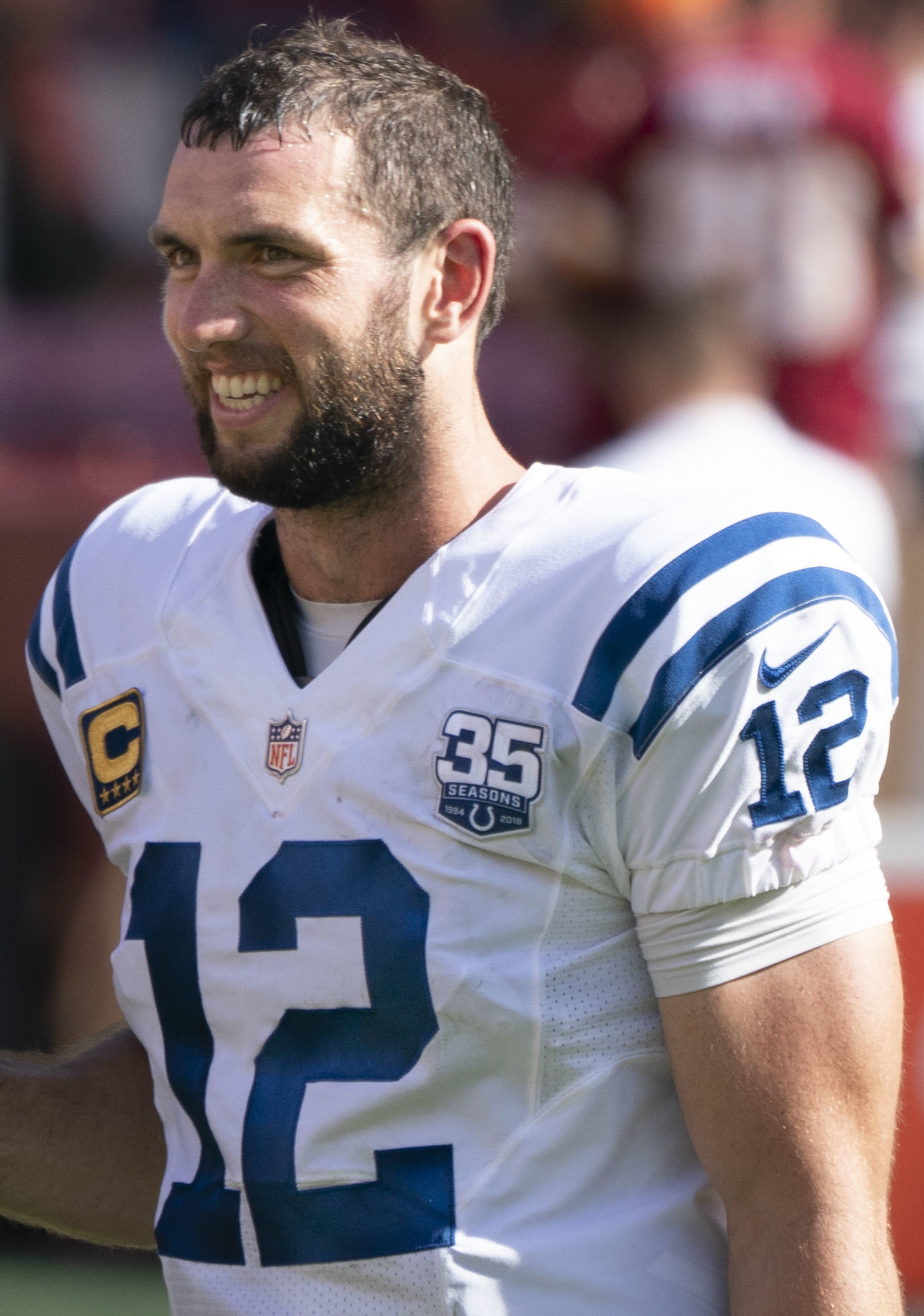
QB Andrew Luck was selected first–overall by the Colts in the 2012 NFL draft. He has proven to be a constant source of frustration for the Titans, consistently overpowering them in every matchup. Upon his retirement, he concluded his career with an impeccable undefeated record against the Titans (11–0).

Luck made his first start against the Titans on October 28, 2012, in Nashville. The Titans led 13–6 going into the 4th quarter. But then, Luck orchestrated an 80–yard touchdown drive, tying the game with 3:24 left and the game went into overtime. Luck led a game-winning touchdown drive in overtime to give the Colts a 19–13 win. Luck rallied the Colts from a 20–7 deficit in the following matchup in Indianapolis in the 3rd quarter, leading them to a 27–23 win.

The Colts, primarily behind Luck, won 11 straight meetings from 2011–2016. On September 28, 2014, Luck delivered his best performance against the Titans. He completed 29–of–41 passes for 393 yards and four touchdowns, achieving a passer rating of 123.3, leading the Colts to a 44–17 win.

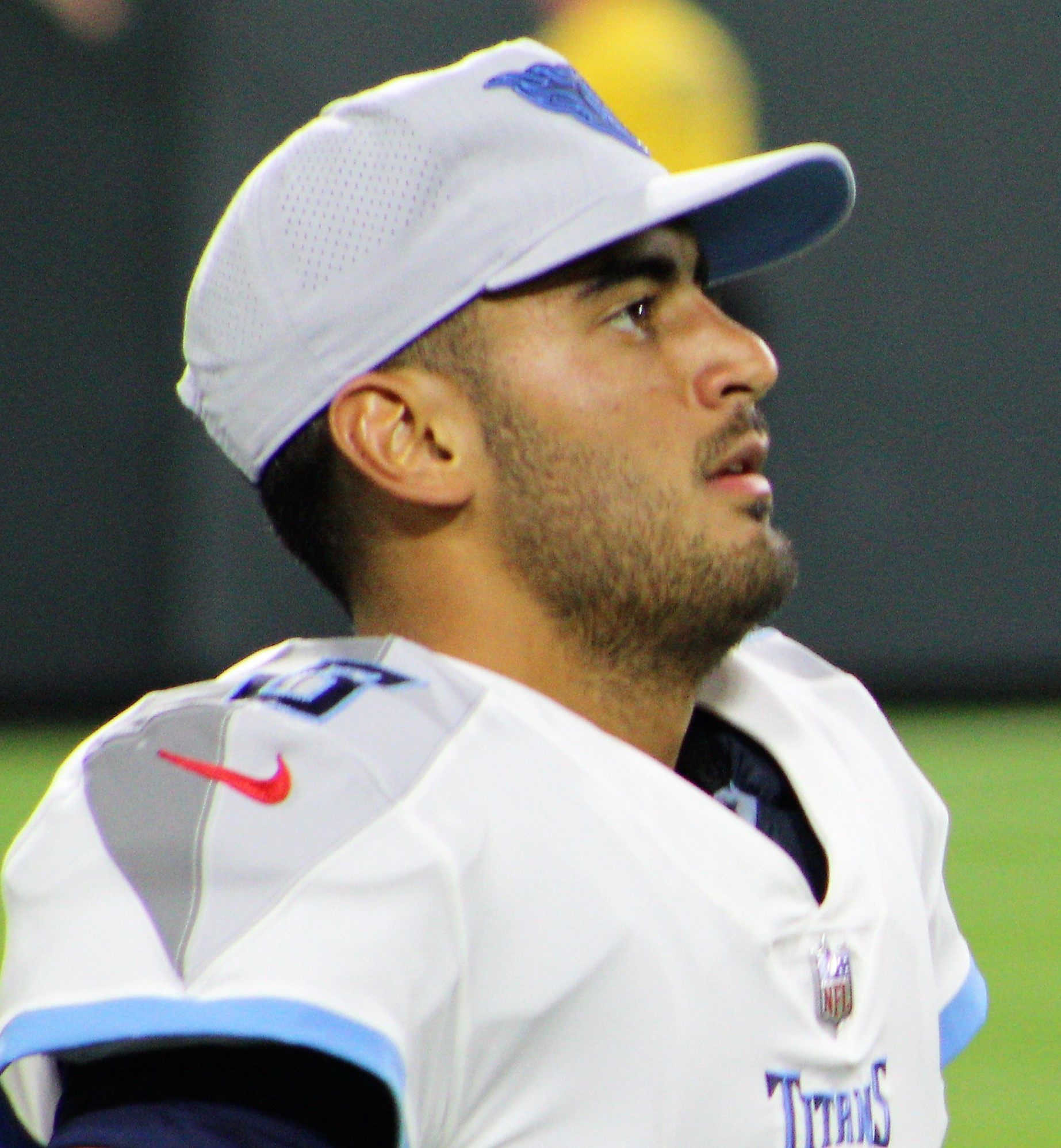
During the 2017 season, QB Marcus Mariota guided the Titans to two 10–point comeback victories over the Colts, achieving a sweep of the series. This marked the end of an eleven–game losing streak against the Colts, including a nine–game skid in Indianapolis, and represented the first sweep of the Colts since the 2002 season.

Luck missed the 2017 season due to shoulder surgery. On October 16, the Titans were able to end the Colts' winning streak with a 36–22 win. The Titans, led by Marcus Mariota's 306 yards passing yards and Derrick Henry's 131 rushing yards, amassed total of 473 yards, marking the franchises' most total yards in any game against the Colts. The Titans won the following game in Indianapolis, 20–16, ending a nine–game losing streak in Indianapolis, and recording their first win at Lucas Oil Stadium. This marked the first time since 2002 that the Titans swept the Colts. The Titans recorded eight sacks against Jacoby Brissett, marking their highest number of sacks against the Colts in a single game.

Luck returned for the 2018 season, and led the Colts to two wins over the Titans. The teams met in Nashville for the final game of the season in a winner–take–all showdown for the final wild-card spot in the playoffs with the losing team being knocked out of playoff contention. The Colts won the game 33–17, clinching the 6th seed despite a 1–5 start to the season. Luck accumulated 285 yards and scored three touchdowns. He also maintained his flawless record against the Titans, improving it to 11–0. This turned out to be the final season for Luck, as he unexpectedly retired the following offseason. Luck amassed 2,935 yards, 21 touchdowns, 9 interceptions, and a passer rating of 98.4 over the 11 games he faced the Titans, going undefeated against them. His exceptional performance and unblemished streak against the Titans significantly contributed to the Colts' overall success.

=== 2019–present: Rivalry becomes balanced ===
The 2019 NFL draft was held in Nashville, Tennessee, attracting a significant number of Titans fans. Seizing the opportunity, former Colts players Reggie Wayne and Pat McAfee decided to playfully mock the Titans supporters present. As Wayne faced boos upon taking the stage, he quipped, "I know you not booin'. C'mon Tennessee. Y'all done played the Colts 20 times in 10 years and you won three games. Stop it." Following the Colts' selection, he continued his comments by saying, “We straight? We good? Cause I got clips. I got heat. Aight, we straight.” When McAfee took his turn at the microphone, he stated, "I'm not going to say a single word about the Tennessee Titans record against the Indianapolis Colts because I was a punter and there's no reason to talk about that. With that being said, we did not punt much against the Tennessee Titans so you probably have no clue who I am to begin."

Both teams were in contention for the AFC South title during the 2020 season when they faced off on November 12 in Nashville. Although the Titans led by halftime, special teams woes ultimately led to a 34–17 Colts victory. The two teams faced off once more on November 29 in Indianapolis. Each team found the end zone on their initial four drives, but the Titans' offense surged, adding three additional touchdowns to establish a commanding 35–14 lead by halftime. Derrick Henry was a standout performer, amassing 140 rushing yards and scoring three touchdowns against the league's second-ranked defense. The Titans would win 45–26, establishing a new record for their largest victory over the Colts with a 19–point differential, as well as setting a record for their most points scored in a game against the Colts at 45.

As the final week approached, both teams held identical 10–5 records, vying for the AFC South title. Initially holding a better record than the Titans, the Colts relinquished a 17–point lead to the Steelers the previous week and ultimately lost. As a result, the Titans now hold the upper hand. Should both teams end the season with the same record, the Titans would secure the tiebreaker due to their better divisional record compared to the Colts. Furthermore, earlier in the day, the Dolphins' defeat to the Bills ensured that the Titans had secured a playoff spot, while the Colts required a win to achieve the same. The Titans were set to face the Texans, while the Colts were set to face the Jaguars. Although the Colts–Jaguars matchup was more competitive than anticipated, the Colts secured their victory with a decisive 45–yard touchdown run in the final minutes, winning 28–14. In contrast, the Titans and Texans engaged in a high–scoring affair, with the Titans even relinquishing a 16–point lead. Ultimately, the Titans won with a game-winning 37–yard field goal, clinching their first AFC South title since 2008. As a result of the NFL's playoff expansion during the offseason, the Colts were placed as the 7th seed, making them the inaugural 7th seed in the AFC. During the playoffs, the Titans were defeated by the Ravens, and the Colts fell to the Bills.

The Titans swept the Colts in 2021 and 2022. On October 31, 2021, Colts quarterback Carson Wentz threw a pick-six in the game's final minutes, allowing the Titans to take the lead. However, Wentz led the Colts on a touchdown drive to force the game into overtime. In overtime, the Titans kicked the game-winning field goal, which was set up by Kevin Byard intercepting Wentz's pass. The Titans clinched their second consecutive AFC South title and achieved the top seed in the AFC for the first time since 2008. Conversely, although the Colts were in a favorable position to reach the playoffs, they lost their final two games.

The Titans swept the Colts for the second consecutive year in the 2022 season, extending their winning streak against them to five games, their longest streak against their rival.

In 2023, the Colts snapped their five-game losing streak to the Titans with a 23–16 home win on October 8. On December 3, the Colts rallied from a 10-point deficit, yet despite reaching the Titans' red zone five times, they could only score one touchdown. A blocked punt by the Titans was returned for a touchdown by the Colts; however, their attempt at a two-point conversion was thwarted when the pass deflected off RB Zack Moss's hands and was intercepted by S Amani Hooker, who then returned it for two points for the Titans. The final score in regulation was a touchdown by the Titans, but their extra point attempt was unsuccessful, resulting in a tie and pushing the game into overtime. In overtime, the Titans kicked a field goal, but the Colts answered with a touchdown, clinching a 31–28 win.

== Season–by–season results ==
Baltimore/Indianapolis Colts vs. Houston Oilers/Tennessee Titans Season–by–Season Results
1970s (Tie, 2–2)

Season	Results	Location	Overall series	Notes
1970	Colts; 24–20	Houston Astrodome	Colts; 1–0	As a result of the AFL–NFL merger, the Colts were placed in the AFC East and the Oilers are placed in the AFC Central. QB Johnny Unitas throws a 31-yard game-winning touchdown with 46 seconds left. Colts win Super Bowl V.
1973	Oilers; 31–27	Baltimore Memorial Stadium	Tie; 1–1	With their win, the Oilers snapped an 18–game losing streak dating back to last season, setting a record for the longest losing game streak post-merge (broken in 1977). This victory would later be the Oilers' only win in their 1973 season.
1976	Colts; 38–14	Baltimore Memorial Stadium	Colts; 2–1	
1979	Oilers; 28–16	Baltimore Memorial Stadium	Tie; 2–2	

1980s (Colts, 4–3)

Season	Results	Location	Overall series	Notes
1980	Oilers; 21–16	Houston Astrodome	Oilers; 3–2	
1983	Colts; 20–10	Baltimore Memorial Stadium	Tie; 3–3	Final game Colts played as a Baltimore-based franchise.
1984	Colts; 35–21	Houston Astrodome	Colts; 4–3	Colts relocate to Indianapolis.
1985	Colts; 34–16	Hoosier Dome	Colts; 5–3	First matchup played in Indianapolis.
1986	Oilers; 31–17	Houston Astrodome	Colts; 5–4	
1987	Colts; 51–27	Hoosier Dome	Colts; 6–4	The Colts score their most points in a game against the Oilers.
1988	Oilers; 17–14 (OT)	Hoosier Dome	Colts; 6–5	Oilers loss to the Browns in their season finale game eliminates the Colts from playoff contention.

1990s (Oilers/Titans 3–1)

Season	Results	Location	Overall series	Notes
1990	Oilers; 24–10	Houston Astrodome	Tie; 6–6	Final matchup played in Houston.
1992	Oilers; 20–10	Hoosier Dome	Oilers; 7–6	
1994	Colts; 45–21	RCA Dome	Tie; 7–7	This game was the last matchup in which the Colts faced the Oilers as a Houston-based team and under the Oilers' name.
1999 playoffs	Titans 19–16	RCA Dome	Titans 8–7	AFC Divisional Round. Oilers relocated to Tennessee in the 1997 season and moved to Nashville this season, rebranding themselves as the Tennessee Titans. Titans go on to lose Super Bowl XXXIV.

2000s (Colts, 11–5)

Season	Season series	at Indianapolis Colts	at Tennessee Titans	Overall series	Notes
2002	Titans 2–0	Titans; 23–15	Titans; 27–17	Titans; 10–7	During the NFL realignment, both teams are placed in the AFC South, resulting in two meetings annually. First matchup played in Nashville, Tennessee.
2003	Colts 2–0	Colts; 33–7	Colts; 29–27	Titans; 10–9	Last season the Titans held the overall series record. Both teams finished with 12–4 records, but the Colts clinched the AFC South based on their head-to-head sweep.
2004	Colts 2–0	Colts; 51–24	Colts; 31–17	Colts; 11–10	In Indianapolis, the Colts tied their most points scored in a game against the Titans (1987).
2005	Colts 2–0	Colts; 35–3	Colts; 31–10	Colts; 13–10	In Indianapolis, the Colts record their largest victory against the Titans with a 32–point differential and clinch a playoff berth with their win.
2006	Tie 1–1	Colts; 14–13	Titans; 20–17	Colts; 14–11	Colts win seven straight meetings (2003–2006). In Nashville, Titans' K Rob Bironas kicked a game-winning 60–yard field goal, setting a franchise record for longest field goal made. Colts win Super Bowl XLI.
2007	Tie 1–1	Titans; 16–10	Colts; 22–20	Colts; 15–12	Last matchup at the RCA Dome. Titans clinch the final playoff berth with their win.
2008	Tie 1–1	Colts; 23–0	Titans; 31–21	Colts; 16–13	Colts open Lucas Oil Stadium. After their loss in Tennessee, the Colts went on a 23-game regular season winning streak, setting an NFL record for the longest winning streak in the regular season only.
2009	Colts 2–0	Colts; 27–17	Colts; 31–9	Colts; 18–13	

2010s (Colts, 16–4)

Season	Season series	at Indianapolis Colts	at Tennessee Titans	Overall series	Notes
2010	Colts 2–0	Colts; 23–20	Colts; 30–28	Colts; 20–13	Last start in the series for Colts' QB Peyton Manning.
2011	Tie 1–1	Colts; 27–13	Titans; 27–10	Colts; 21–14	Colts' win ended a 13-game losing streak and earned them their first win of the season after an 0–13 start.
2012	Colts 2–0	Colts; 27–23	Colts; 19–13 (OT)	Colts; 23–14	First start in the series for Colts' QB Andrew Luck.
2013	Colts 2–0	Colts; 22–14	Colts; 30–27	Colts; 25–14	Colts complete a sweep of the AFC South division.
2014	Colts 2–0	Colts; 41–17	Colts; 27–10	Colts; 27–14	In Tennessee, Colts' victory resulted in a sweep of the AFC South division for the second consecutive year.
2015	Colts 2–0	Colts; 30–24	Colts; 35–33	Colts; 29–14	In Tennessee, Colts overcame a 27–14 fourth quarter deficit.
2016	Colts 2–0	Colts; 24–17	Colts; 34–26	Colts; 31–14	In Tennessee, Colts' K Adam Vinatieri kicked his 43rd consecutive field goal, setting an NFL record. In Indianapolis, Vinatieri field goal streak ended at 44. Colts won 11 straight meetings (2011–2016) and 9 straight home meetings (2008–2016).
2017	Titans 2–0	Titans; 20–16	Titans; 36–22	Colts; 31–16	Titans sweep Colts for the first time since the 2002 season.
2018	Colts 2–0	Colts; 38–10	Colts; 33–17	Colts; 33–16	In Tennessee, Colts clinched the final playoff spot and eliminated the Titans from playoff contention with their win. Final season for Andrew Luck. He finished his career with an unbeaten 11–0 record against the Titans.
2019	Tie 1–1	Titans; 31–17	Colts; 19–17	Colts; 34–17	

2020s (Colts, 7–6)

Season	Season series	at Indianapolis Colts	at Tennessee Titans	Overall series	Notes
2020	Tie 1–1	Titans; 45–26	Colts; 34–17	Colts; 35–18	In Indianapolis, Titans record their largest victory against the Colts with a 19–point differential and score their most points in a game against the Colts. Both teams finish with 11–5 records, but the Titans clinch the AFC South based on a better division record.
2021	Titans 2–0	Titans; 34–31 (OT)	Titans; 25–16	Colts; 35–20	
2022	Titans 2–0	Titans; 24–17	Titans; 19–10	Colts; 35–22	
2023	Colts 2–0	Colts; 23–16	Colts; 31–28 (OT)	Colts; 37–22	
2024	Colts 2−0	Colts; 38−30	Colts; 20−17	Colts; 39–22	In Indianapolis, Colts accumulated 335 rushing yards, setting a franchise record for their most rushing yards in a game.
2025	Colts 2−0	Colts; 38−14	Colts; 41−20	Colts; 41–22	
2026	Titans 1–0	Titans; 26–20	December 20	Colts; 41–23	

Summary of Results

Season	Season series	at Baltimore/Indianapolis Colts	at Houston Oilers/Tennessee Titans	Notes
Regular season	Colts 41–22	Colts 21–12	Colts 20–10	
Postseason	Titans 1–0	Titans 1–0	no games	AFC Divisional: 1999
Regular and postseason	Colts 41–23	Colts 21–13	Colts 20–10	Both teams are tied 2–2 in Baltimore. Oilers/Titans have a 3–2 record in Houston. Colts currently have a 19–11 record in Indianapolis and an 18–7 record in Nashville, Tennessee.

== Connections between the teams ==
- Andre Johnson
- Denico Autry
- Kerry Collins
- Matt Hasselbeck

== See also ==
- List of NFL rivalries
- AFC South
