= AFC South =

Division of the American Football Conference

- Conference: American Football Conference
- League: National Football League
- Sport: American football
- Founded: 2002
- No. of teams: 4
- Most recent champions: Jacksonville Jaguars (3rd title) (2025)
- Most titles: Indianapolis Colts (9 titles)

AFC South Teams Location

The American Football Conference – Southern Division or AFC South is one of the four divisions of the American Football Conference (AFC) in the National Football League (NFL). It was created before the 2002 season when the league realigned divisions after expanding to 32 teams. Since its creation, the division has had the same four members: the Houston Texans, Indianapolis Colts, Jacksonville Jaguars, and Tennessee Titans.

Before the 2002 season, the Texans did not exist, the Colts belonged to the AFC East, and the Titans and Jaguars were members of the AFC Central. The AFC South is often regarded as the NFL's "newest" division since at the time of its establishment none of the new division's members had played more than eighteen seasons in their current cities. The Colts had played in Baltimore until the end of the 1983 season, the Jaguars commenced play in 1995 and the Titans had been based in Houston (where they were known as the Oilers) until 1996. However, Indianapolis, Tennessee and Jacksonville had all won multiple division titles and wild card berths in their prior respective divisions.

The Colts hold a 572–514–8 record and a 23–25 playoff record with two NFL league crowns, four Super Bowl appearances and two wins. The Titans hold a record of 480–526–6 with a playoff record of 17–23 including two AFL championships (as the Houston Oilers) and a loss in Super Bowl XXXIV. The Jaguars hold a 210–286–0 record and an 8–8 playoff record. The Texans made the playoffs for the first time in their ten-season existence in 2011 and hold a 169–214–1 record and a 7-9 playoff record.

The Colts' Super Bowl XLI victory in 2006 is the only Super Bowl win from the AFC South to date, although the Colts have won another Super Bowl while playing in a different division (and a different city). The division owns the longest active Super Bowl victory drought, since at least one team from each of the other seven divisions has won one of the eighteen subsequent Super Bowls — in fact seven divisions won seven Super Bowls between 2009 and 2015 — although the Colts did participate in 2009's Super Bowl XLIV. The AFC South is also the only division with more than one team (the Jaguars and Texans) that has never played in a Super Bowl.

This is the only division in the NFL in which all member teams have hosted a Super Bowl in their stadiums.

== History ==
=== 2000s ===
When the NFL realigned for the 2002 schedule, the newly created AFC South was formed from two former AFC Central teams, an AFC East team, and an expansion team. Its inaugural season was won by the Tennessee Titans who went on to play in the AFC Championship game. For the next five years, the Indianapolis Colts won the division including their victory in Super Bowl XLI. In 2007, the AFC South had the best division record of all time based on the combined 42–22 (.656 winning percentage). The record was previously held by the 1975 AFC Central's .643 winning percentage. In 2008, the Tennessee Titans won the division, ending Indianapolis' five-year streak of division titles. However, in 2009, the Colts would storm back to win their 6th division championship in Week 12 of the season with a win over the Houston Texans and a loss by the Jacksonville Jaguars to the San Francisco 49ers.

=== 2010s ===
In 2010, the Indianapolis Colts again won their division with a 10–6 record. They won their final four games, including a victory over the Jaguars that tied the records of the two teams. The Colts controlled their own destiny, with the Jacksonville Jaguars losing its last three games of the season. In 2011, the Houston Texans won their first AFC South title, qualifying for the playoffs for the first time in franchise history. In Week 14, Houston had to beat Cincinnati and New Orleans had to beat the Tennessee Titans to secure the playoffs for Houston. Houston won 20–19 and New Orleans won 22–17 against the Titans, giving Houston its first ever playoff spot. The Texans had won their first Playoff game against the Cincinnati Bengals 31–10 but then lost to the Baltimore Ravens 20–13 in the Divisional game. The Texans repeated as AFC South champions in 2012 as well after beating Indianapolis 29–17 in Week 15 that season. In the playoffs, the Texans beat the Bengals once again, 19–13, but lost to the New England Patriots 41–28 during the Divisional Weekend. The Colts would retake the AFC South division crown in 2013. Indianapolis swept all three of its divisional opponents during the 2013 campaign to reclaim its first division title since 2010. Again in 2014, the Colts claimed the division title by defeating the Texans in a week 15 matchup, 17–10. The Texans took over as AFC South champions in 2015 following their 30–6 win over Jacksonville in week 16. Houston repeated as division champions in 2016; despite finishing with matching 9–7 records along with Tennessee, the Texans earned the AFC South's automatic berth into the NFL playoffs based on finishing better against the division (5–1) than the Titans (2–4). In 2017, the Jaguars won their first AFC South title after a Titans loss to the Rams in Week 16. In the previous week, the Jaguars had clinched their first playoff berth since 2007, with a win against the Texans. The Texans reclaimed the division crown with an 11–5 record in 2018, though the Colts also made the playoffs as a wild card and defeated the Texans in Houston in the first round by a score of 21–7. In 2019, the Texans won their sixth division title with a 10–6 record, and the Titans reached the Wildcard with 9–7. The Texans would win in the Wildcard vs. the Buffalo Bills and make it to the divisional round, losing 51–31 to the Kansas City Chiefs. The Titans, however, would make it to the AFC Championship, also losing 35–24 to the Chiefs.

== Results ==
=== Team success ===
Team success
Team	Years in division	Playoff berths	Division championships	AFC Championship Game appearances	Super Bowl appearances	Super Bowl wins	Refs
Indianapolis Colts	2002–present	14	9	4	2	1	
Jacksonville Jaguars	2002–present	5	3	1	0	0	
Houston Texans	2002–present	9	8	0	0	0	
Tennessee Titans	2002–present	8	4	2	0	0	

=== Season-by-season ===
^{(#)}	Denotes team that won the Super Bowl
^{(#)}	Denotes team that won the AFC Championship
^{(#)}	Denotes team that qualified for the NFL Playoffs

Season	Team (record)			
Season	1st	2nd	3rd	4th
2002: The AFC South was formed with three inaugural members and one expansion member. An expansion team, Houston Texans, joined the division. the Indianapolis Colts joined from the AFC East. While The Jacksonville Jaguars and Tennessee Titans joined from the AFC Central, now the AFC North.
2002	^{(2)} Tennessee (11–5)	^{(5)} Indianapolis (10–6)	Jacksonville (6–10)	Houston (4–12)
2003	^{(3)} Indianapolis (12–4)	^{(5)} Tennessee (12–4)	Jacksonville (5–11)	Houston (5–11)
2004	^{(3)} Indianapolis (12–4)	Jacksonville (9–7)	Houston (7–9)	Tennessee (5–11)
2005	^{(1)} Indianapolis (14–2)	^{(5)} Jacksonville (12–4)	Tennessee (4–12)	Houston (2–14)
2006	^{(3)} Indianapolis (12–4)	Tennessee (8–8)	Jacksonville (8–8)	Houston (6–10)
2007	^{(2)} Indianapolis (13–3)	^{(5)} Jacksonville (11–5)	^{(6)} Tennessee (10–6)	Houston (8–8)
2008	^{(1)} Tennessee (13–3)	^{(5)} Indianapolis (12–4)	Houston (8–8)	Jacksonville (5–11)
2009	^{(1)} Indianapolis (14–2)	Houston (9–7)	Tennessee (8–8)	Jacksonville (7–9)
2010	^{(3)} Indianapolis (10–6)	Jacksonville (8–8)	Houston (6–10)	Tennessee (6–10)
2011	^{(3)} Houston (10–6)	Tennessee (9–7)	Jacksonville (5–11)	Indianapolis (2–14)
2012	^{(3)} Houston (12–4)	^{(5)} Indianapolis (11–5)	Tennessee (6–10)	Jacksonville (2–14)
2013	^{(4)} Indianapolis (11–5)	Tennessee (7–9)	Jacksonville (4–12)	Houston (2–14)
2014	^{(4)} Indianapolis (11–5)	Houston (9–7)	Jacksonville (3–13)	Tennessee (2–14)
2015	^{(4)} Houston (9–7)	Indianapolis (8–8)	Jacksonville (5–11)	Tennessee (3–13)
2016	^{(4)} Houston (9–7)	Tennessee (9–7)	Indianapolis (8–8)	Jacksonville (3–13)
2017	^{(3)} Jacksonville (10–6)	^{(5)} Tennessee (9–7)	Indianapolis (4–12)	Houston (4–12)
2018	^{(3)} Houston (11–5)	^{(6)} Indianapolis (10–6)	Tennessee (9–7)	Jacksonville (5–11)
2019	^{(4)} Houston (10–6)	^{(6)} Tennessee (9–7)	Indianapolis (7–9)	Jacksonville (6–10)
2020	^{(4)} Tennessee (11–5)	^{(7)} Indianapolis (11–5)	Houston (4–12)	Jacksonville (1–15)
2021	^{(1)} Tennessee (12–5)	Indianapolis (9–8)	Houston (4–13)	Jacksonville (3–14)
2022	^{(4)} Jacksonville (9–8)	Tennessee (7–10)	Indianapolis (4–12–1)	Houston (3–13–1)
2023	^{(4)} Houston (10–7)	Jacksonville (9–8)	Indianapolis (9–8)	Tennessee (6–11)
2024	^{(4)} Houston (10–7)	Indianapolis (8–9)	Jacksonville (4–13)	Tennessee (3–14)
2025	^{(3)} Jacksonville (13–4)	^{(5)} Houston (12–5)	Indianapolis (8–9)	Tennessee (3–14)
2026	Jacksonville (6-2)	Houston (3-7)	Indianapolis (2-7)	Tennessee (1-7)

== See also ==
- Colts–Jaguars rivalry
- Colts–Texans rivalry
- Colts–Titans rivalry
- Jaguars–Texans rivalry
- Jaguars–Titans rivalry
- Texans–Titans rivalry
