= Jaguars–Texans rivalry =

National Football League rivalry

- Jacksonville Jaguars Houston Texans
- Location: Jacksonville, Houston
- First meeting: October 27, 2002; Texans 21, Jaguars 19
- Latest meeting: October 18, 2026; Texans 34, Jaguars 31
- Next meeting: December 20, 2026
- Stadiums: Jaguars: EverBank Stadium; Texans: NRG Stadium

Statistics
- Total meetings: 49
- All-time series: Texans: 33–16
- Largest victory: Jaguars: 45–7 (2017); Texans: 30–6 (2015)
- Most points scored: Jaguars: 45 (2017); Texans: 43 (2012)
- Longest win streak: Jaguars: 3 (2009–2010); Texans: 9 (2018–2022)
- Current win streak: Texans: 2 (2025–present)

The Jaguars–Texans rivalry is a National Football League (NFL) rivalry between the Jacksonville Jaguars and the Houston Texans.

Having begun play in 1995 and 2002, the Jaguars and Texans are among two of the most recently established franchises in the NFL, originating in the 2000s. The Texans specifically became the 32nd NFL franchise, leading the NFL to realign its divisions to create eight divisions of four teams. The Jaguars were moved from the AFC Central to the newly formed AFC South, which the Texans were also placed into. Since then, they have competed as division rivals.

The Texans lead the overall series, 33–16. The two teams have not met in the playoffs.

== 2000s ==
The 2000s proved to be an even decade for the rivalry, with both teams winning eight games against the other. Three of the first four games played between the two teams were close affairs; the exception, a 27–0 Jaguars blowout win was the first shutout suffered by the Texans in their franchise history.

The first match between the two teams occurred in Jacksonville on October 27, 2002. The Texans won the game 21–19 as Kris Brown kicked a game-winning field goal with 54 seconds left to help Houston earn its first away victory in franchise history.

In 2008, the Jaguars defeated the Texans in an overtime match. David Garrard, the Jaguars' starting quarterback for much of the rivalry during the late 2000s, helped Jacksonville set up a game winning field-goal. Josh Scobee would deliver the kick to win 30–27.

== 2010s ==
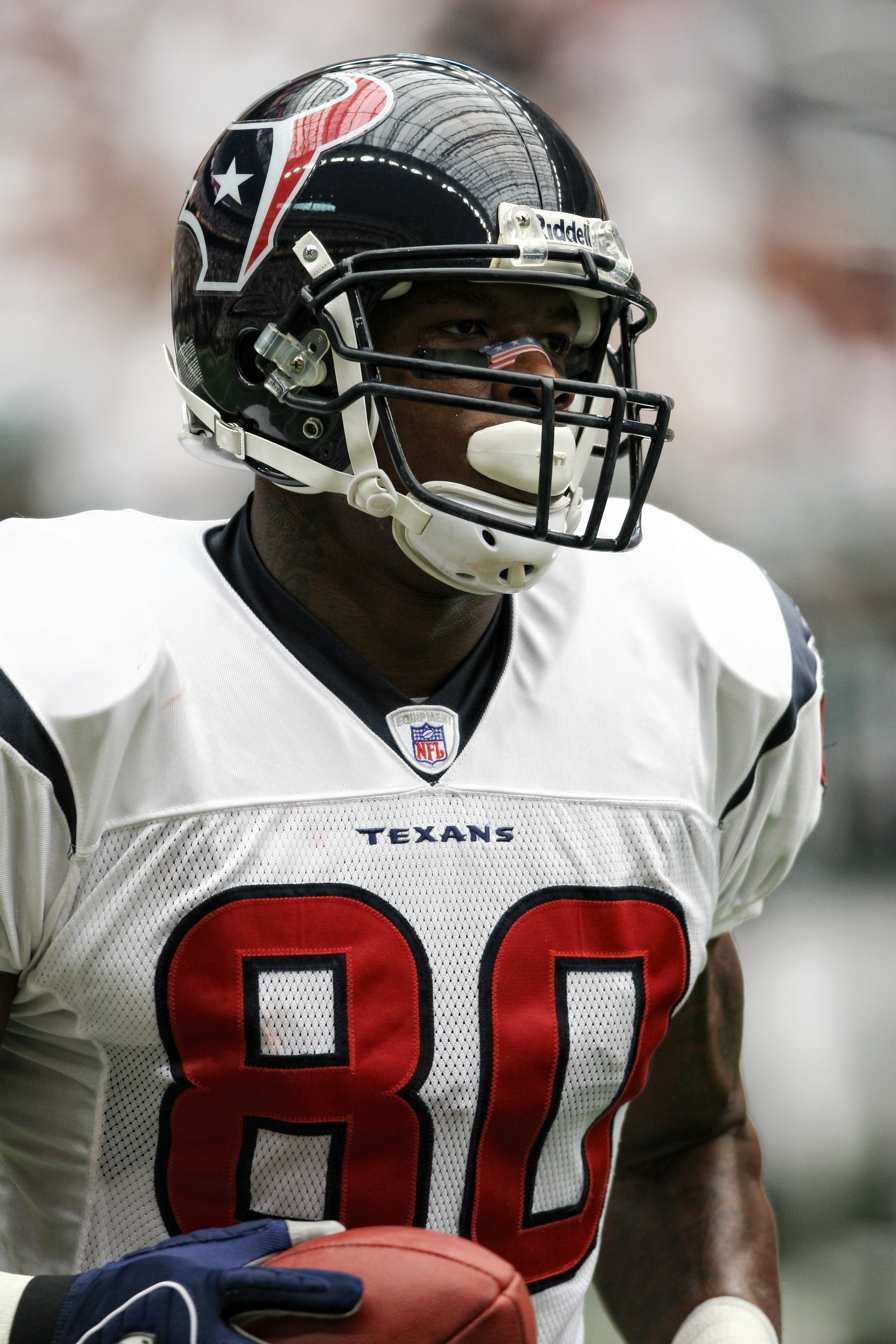
Andre Johnson set career highs in receptions and receiving yards against the Jaguars in 2012

Unlike the 2000s, season series splits were rare, only occurring in 2010. The Houston Texans dominated the rivalry during the 2010s, sweeping the series in seven of ten seasons. The Jaguars were able to pull off series sweeps in 2013 and 2017. The latter occurred en route to an AFC Championship game appearance for the Jaguars.

In the 2011 NFL draft, the Jaguars and Texans had the 10th and 11th picks, respectively. Needing a quarterback, the Jaguars selected Blaine Gabbert from Missouri, while the Texans selected defensive lineman J. J. Watt from Wisconsin. While Gabbert flamed out after three seasons in Jacksonville and was eventually traded, Watt became a three-time NFL Defensive Player of the Year winner and, in the process, became a notable figure of the rivalry.

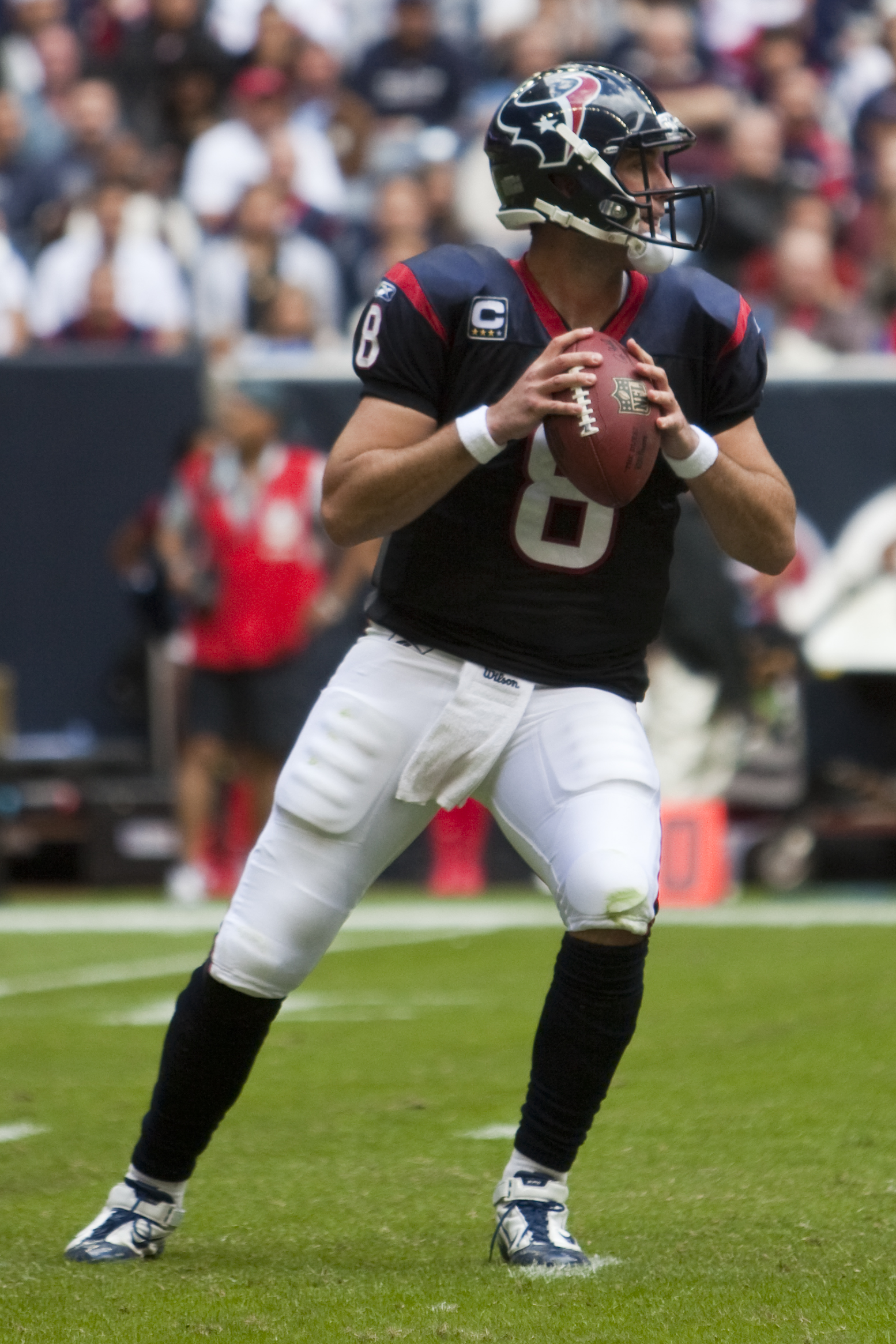
On November 8, 2012, Texans quarterback Matt Schaub (pictured) completed a franchise-record 43 passes and threw for 527 yards as he led the Texans to a 43–37 victory. His 527 passing yards was second most in NFL history.

In 2010, the Jaguars won at home 31–24 thanks to a successful 50-yard Hail Mary attempt by Garrard as time ran out. Notably, Texans cornerback Glover Quin tipped the ball down before it was caught by Jaguars receiver Mike Thomas.

One of the more memorable games of the rivalry is a 43–37 overtime victory by the Texans in 2012. Playing at home, they were nearly upset by the Jaguars, but quarterback Matt Schaub completed a touchdown pass to wide receiver Andre Johnson with two minutes left in overtime to secure a victory. Schaub threw for 527 passing yards and 5 passing touchdowns during the game, both career highs. The former also ranks as the second-most passing yards in a single game in NFL history. Johnson's 14 receptions for 273 yards were both career highs, with the latter being a team record.

Deshaun Watson, who played for the Texans from 2017 to 2021, has been cited as another player who helped the Texans dominate the Jaguars in the rivalry.

== 2020s ==
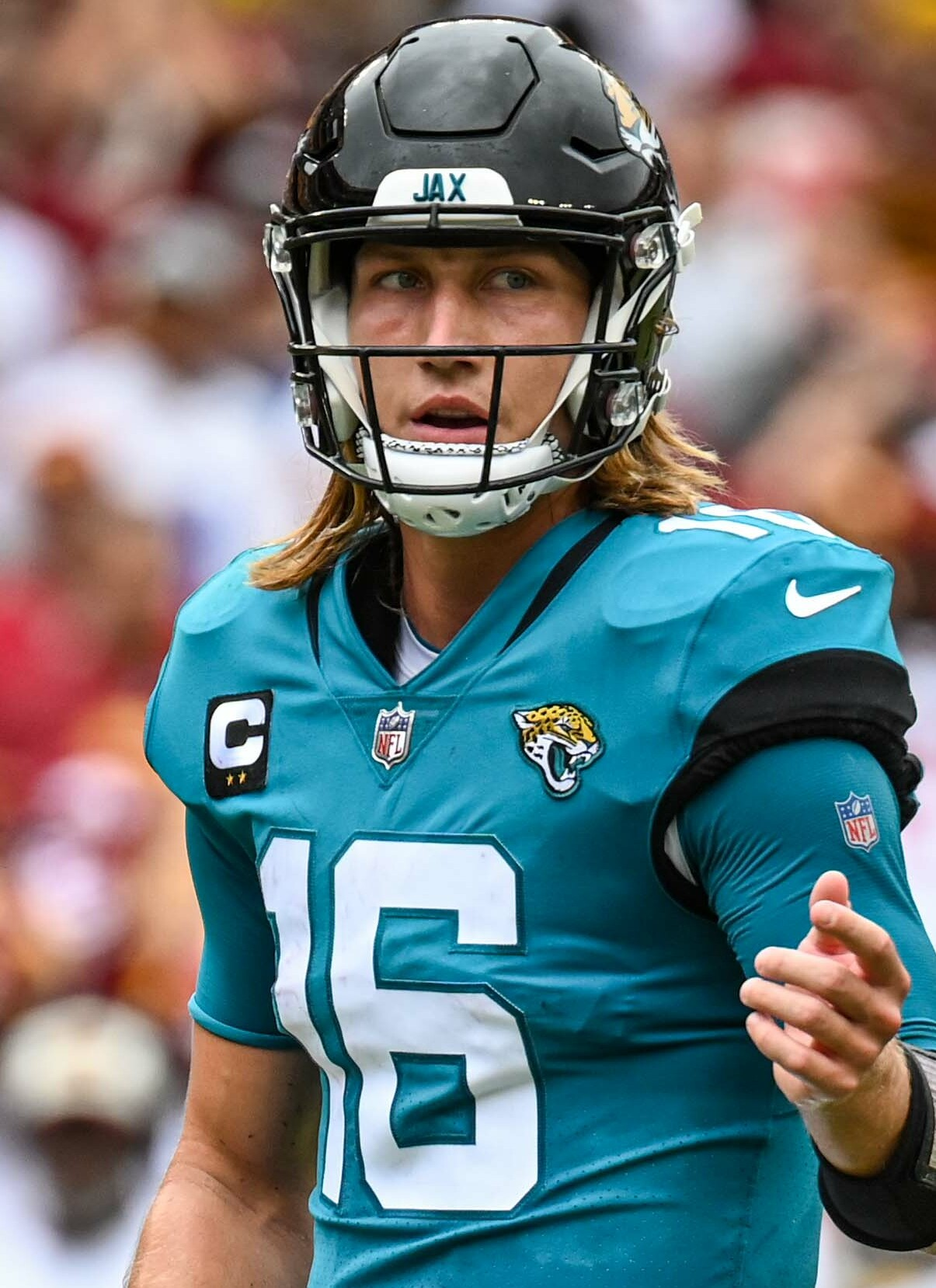
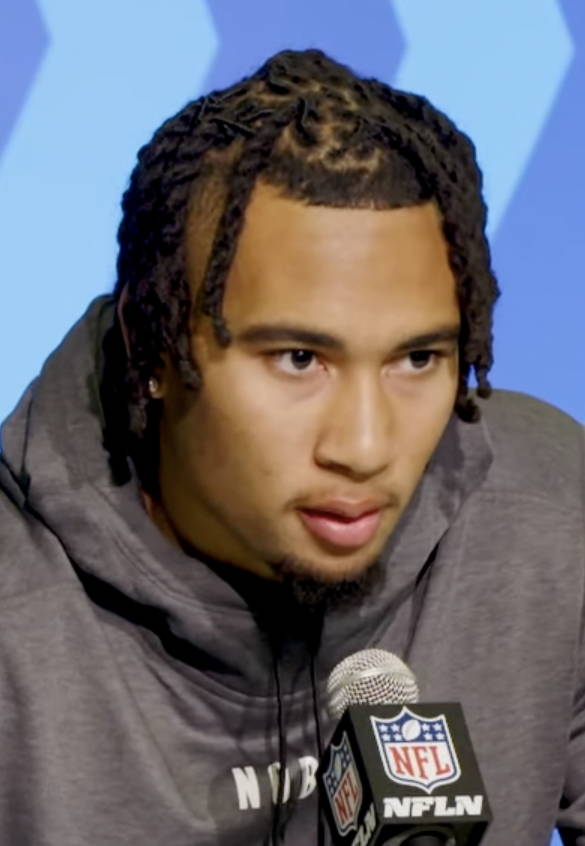
The rivalry intensified in the 2020s after Trevor Lawrence (left) and C. J. Stroud (right) became the franchise quarterbacks for each team respectively, with both making multiple division titles and playoff appearances.

The Texans continued their dominance of the rivalry to begin the 2020s. In 2022, Sports Illustratedwriter Zach Dimmit wrote "It might be hard to find a more historically lopsided division rivalry in the league."

Watt recorded his 100th career sack in a win against the Jaguars in 2020.

In 2022, the previously winless Texans defeated the Jaguars 13–6, as they forced Jaguars quarterback Trevor Lawrence into multiple turnovers. However, during the teams' second matchup of the season, Jacksonville blew out the Texans 31–3, snapping Houston's 9-game winning streak in the rivalry series.

In 2023, under rookie quarterback C. J. Stroud, the Texans defeated the Jaguars 37–17 in what would be Stroud's first win as a Texan. In Week 12, the two teams battled in a close game with both quarterbacks throwing for over 300 yards, with the Jaguars ending up winning 24–21 from a missed game-tying field goal by Texans kicker Matt Ammendola. Despite splitting the series, the Texans clinched the division with a 10–7 record, due to a late-season collapse by the Jaguars who finished 9–8.

In 2024, the rivalry intensified further when Texans linebacker Azeez Al-Shaair illegally hit quarterback Trevor Lawrence as he was sliding a yard short of a first down. As a result of the hit, Lawrence suffered a concussion and was declared out for the rest of the game while Al-Shaair was ejected. The incident incited a brawl involving multiple players, with Jaguars cornerback Jarrian Jones also being ejected. The Texans went on to win the game 23–20, completing a sweep of the Jaguars after previously defeating them 24–20 in Week 4.

In Week 10 of the 2025 NFL season, the Texans had a comeback victory against the Jaguars. The Jaguars led 29-10 after three quarters, but backup quarterback Davis Mills led a comeback, scoring twenty unanswered points to take a 30-29 lead. Trevor Lawrence was sacked by Will Anderson Jr. as time expired, fumbling the football, which was returned by Sheldon Rankins for a touchdown, making the final score 36-29.

== Season-by-season results ==
Jacksonville Jaguars vs. Houston Texans Season-by-Season Results
2000s (Tied, 8–8)

Season	Season series	at Jacksonville Jaguars	at Houston Texans	Overall series	Notes
2002	Tie 1–1	Texans; 21–19	Jaguars; 24–21	Tied; 1–1	Texans join the National Football League (NFL) as an expansion team. During the NFL realignment, the Jaguars and Texans are placed in the newly created AFC South, resulting in two meetings annually. Texans' win in Jacksonville was their first road win in franchise history.
2003	Tie 1–1	Jaguars; 27–0	Texans; 24–20	Tied; 2–2	
2004	Texans 2–0	Texans; 21–0	Texans; 20–6	Texans; 4–2	Following their win in Jacksonville, the Texans went on a 12-game road losing streak.
2005	Jaguars 2–0	Jaguars; 21–14	Jaguars; 38–20	Tied; 4–4	
2006	Texans 2–0	Texans; 13–10	Texans; 27–7	Texans; 6–4	Texans' win in Jacksonville snapped their 12-game road losing streak.
2007	Tie 1–1	Jaguars; 37–17	Texans; 42–28	Texans; 7–5	
2008	Tie 1–1	Jaguars; 30–27 (OT)	Texans; 30–17	Texans; 8–6	
2009	Jaguars 2–0	Jaguars; 23–18	Jaguars; 31–24	Tied; 8–8	

2010s (Texans, 15–5)

Season	Season series	at Jacksonville Jaguars	at Houston Texans	Overall series	Notes
2010	Tie 1–1	Jaguars; 31–24	Texans; 34–17	Tied; 9–9	
2011	Texans 2–0	Texans; 20–13	Texans; 24–14	Texans; 11–9	Texans draft DE J. J. Watt.
2012	Texans 2–0	Texans; 27–7	Texans; 43–37 (OT)	Texans; 13–9	In Houston, Texans overcame a 34–20 fourth quarter deficit and scored their most points in a game against the Jaguars. Texans finished with 653 yards, setting a franchise record for their most yards in a game. Texans' QB Matt Schaub threw for 527 yards, setting a franchise record for most passing yards in a game. Meanwhile, the Jaguars set franchise records for most yards allowed in a game and most passing yards allowed in a game.
2013	Jaguars 2–0	Jaguars; 27–20	Jaguars; 13–6	Texans; 13–11	
2014	Texans 2–0	Texans; 27–13	Texans; 23–17	Texans; 15–11	
2015	Texans 2–0	Texans; 31–20	Texans; 30–6	Texans; 17–11	In Houston, Texans record their largest victory against the Jaguars with a 24–point differential.
2016	Texans 2–0	Texans; 24–21	Texans; 21–20	Texans; 19–11	
2017	Jaguars 2–0	Jaguars; 45–7	Jaguars; 29–7	Texans; 19–13	In Houston, the Jaguars finish with ten sacks, setting a franchise record for most sacks in a game. In Jacksonville, the Jaguars recorded their largest victory against the Texans with a 38–point differential and scored their most points in a game against the Texans.
2018	Texans 2–0	Texans; 20–7	Texans; 20–3	Texans; 21–13	
2019	Texans 2–0	Texans; 26–3	Texans; 13–12	Texans; 23–13	Jaguars home game played at Wembley Stadium in London as part of NFL International Series.

2020s (Texans, 10–3)

Season	Season series	at Jacksonville Jaguars	at Houston Texans	Overall series	Notes
2020	Texans 2–0	Texans; 27–25	Texans; 30–14	Texans; 25–13	In Jacksonville, Jaguars' K Josh Lambo kicked a 59–yard field goal, tying the franchise record for longest field goal made.
2021	Texans 2–0	Texans; 30–16	Texans; 37–21	Texans; 27–13	
2022	Tie 1–1	Texans; 13–6	Jaguars; 31–3	Texans; 28–14	Texans won nine straight meetings (2018–2022). Both teams split the season series for the first time since the 2010 season.
2023	Tie 1–1	Texans; 37–17	Jaguars; 24–21	Texans; 29–15	
2024	Texans 2–0	Texans; 23–20	Texans; 24–20	Texans; 31–15	In Jacksonville, Texans LB Azeez Al-Shaair delivered an illegal hit to Jaguars QB Trevor Lawrence, resulting in a brawl between players from both teams. As a result, both Al-Shaair and Jaguars CB Jarrian Jones were ejected from the game, while Lawrence was ruled out for the rest of the game. Al-Shaair received a three-game suspension for his actions. Texans won seven straight road meetings (2018–2024).
2025	Tie 1–1	Jaguars; 17–10	Texans; 36–29	Texans; 32–16	In Houston, Texans overcame a 29–10 fourth quarter deficit, marking the largest blown lead in Jaguars history. Both teams qualified for the playoffs in the same season for the first time in their mutual existence.
2026	Texans 1–0	Texans; 34–31	December 20	Texans; 33–16	Jaguars home game played at Wembley Stadium in London as part of NFL International Series.

Summary of Results

Season	Season series	at Jacksonville Jaguars	at Houston Texans	Notes
Regular season	Texans; 33–16	Texans; 16–9	Texans; 17–7	Texans are 2–0 at Wembley Stadium in Wembley, London (2019, 2026), accounted for as Jaguars home games.

== See also ==
- List of NFL rivalries
- AFC South
