= Jaguars–Titans rivalry =

National Football League rivalry

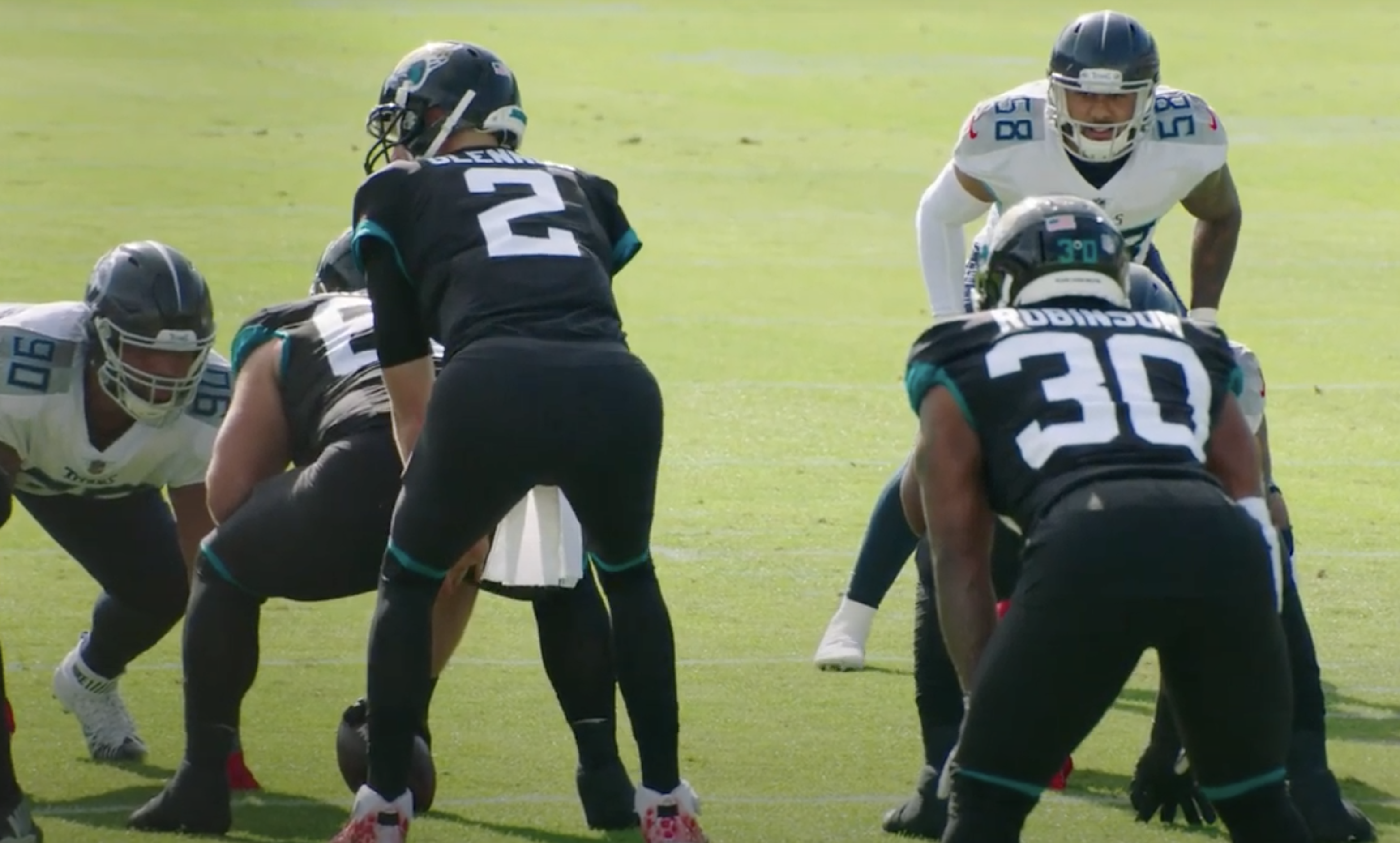
- Jaguars and Titans face off during the 2020 season.

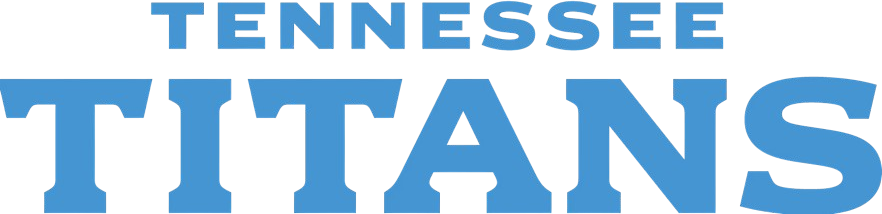
- Jacksonville Jaguars Tennessee Titans
- Location: Jacksonville, Nashville
- First meeting: September 3, 1995; Oilers 10, Jaguars 3
- Latest meeting: November 15, 2026; Jaguars 40, Titans 23
- Next meeting: November 29, 2026
- Stadiums: Jaguars: EverBank Stadium; Titans: Nissan Stadium

Statistics
- Total meetings: 64
- All-time series: Titans: 35–29
- Regular season series: Titans: 34–29
- Postseason results: Titans: 1–0
- Largest victory: Jaguars: 41–7 (2025); Titans: 41–14 (1999), 30–3 (2010)
- Most points scored: Jaguars: 41 (2025); Titans: 42 (2015), (2019)
- Longest win streak: Jaguars: 5 (2024–present); Titans: 5 (1998–2000; 2001–2003; 2019–2021)
- Current win streak: Jaguars: 5 (2024–present)

Post-season history
- 1999 AFC Championship: Titans won: 33–14
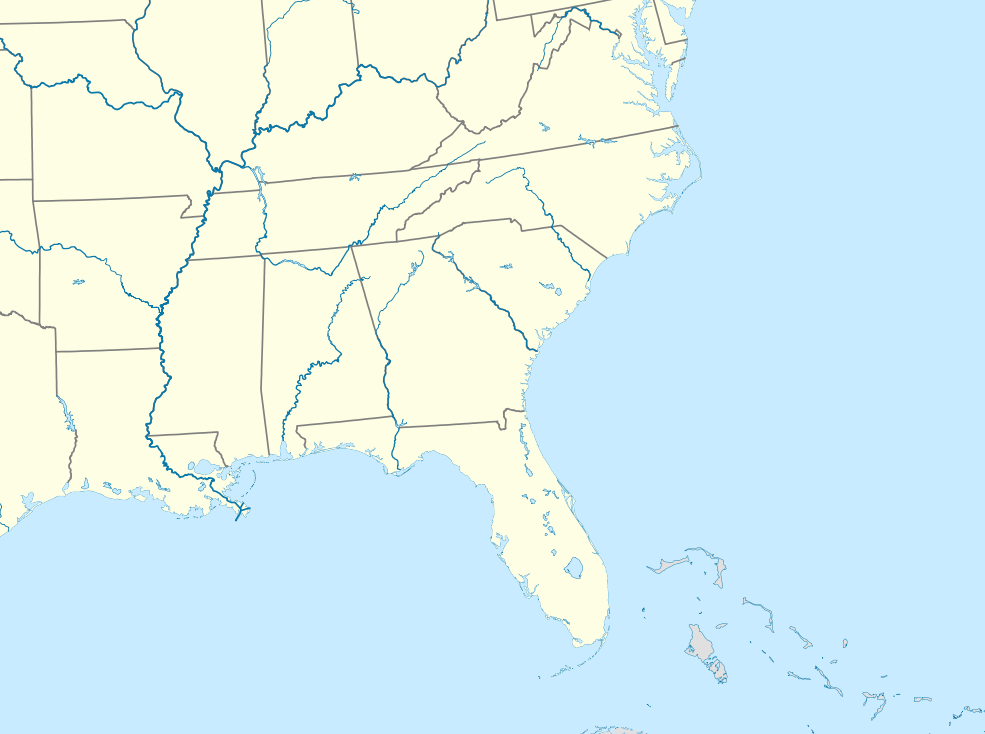

The Jaguars–Titans rivalry is a National Football League (NFL) rivalry between the Jacksonville Jaguars and Tennessee Titans.

The first game of the rivalry was played on September 3, 1995, at EverBank Stadium (then Jacksonville Municipal Stadium) in Jacksonville, Florida. In the first regular season game for Jacksonville's new expansion franchise, the Titans, then known as the Houston Oilers, defeated the Jaguars 10–3. The rivalry intensified during the 1999–2000 postseason, when the 14–2 Jaguars (both losses were against Tennessee), champions of the AFC Central division, hosted the newly named Titans, who were 13–3, in the AFC Championship Game. The Titans eventually erased a 14–10 halftime deficit to win 33–14. The Titans then lost to the St. Louis Rams in Super Bowl XXXIV. During the 2002 NFL realignment, both teams were placed in the newly created AFC South, becoming divisional rivals and meeting twice annually per season.

The Titans lead the overall series, 35–29. The two teams have met once in the playoffs, with the Titans winning.

== History ==
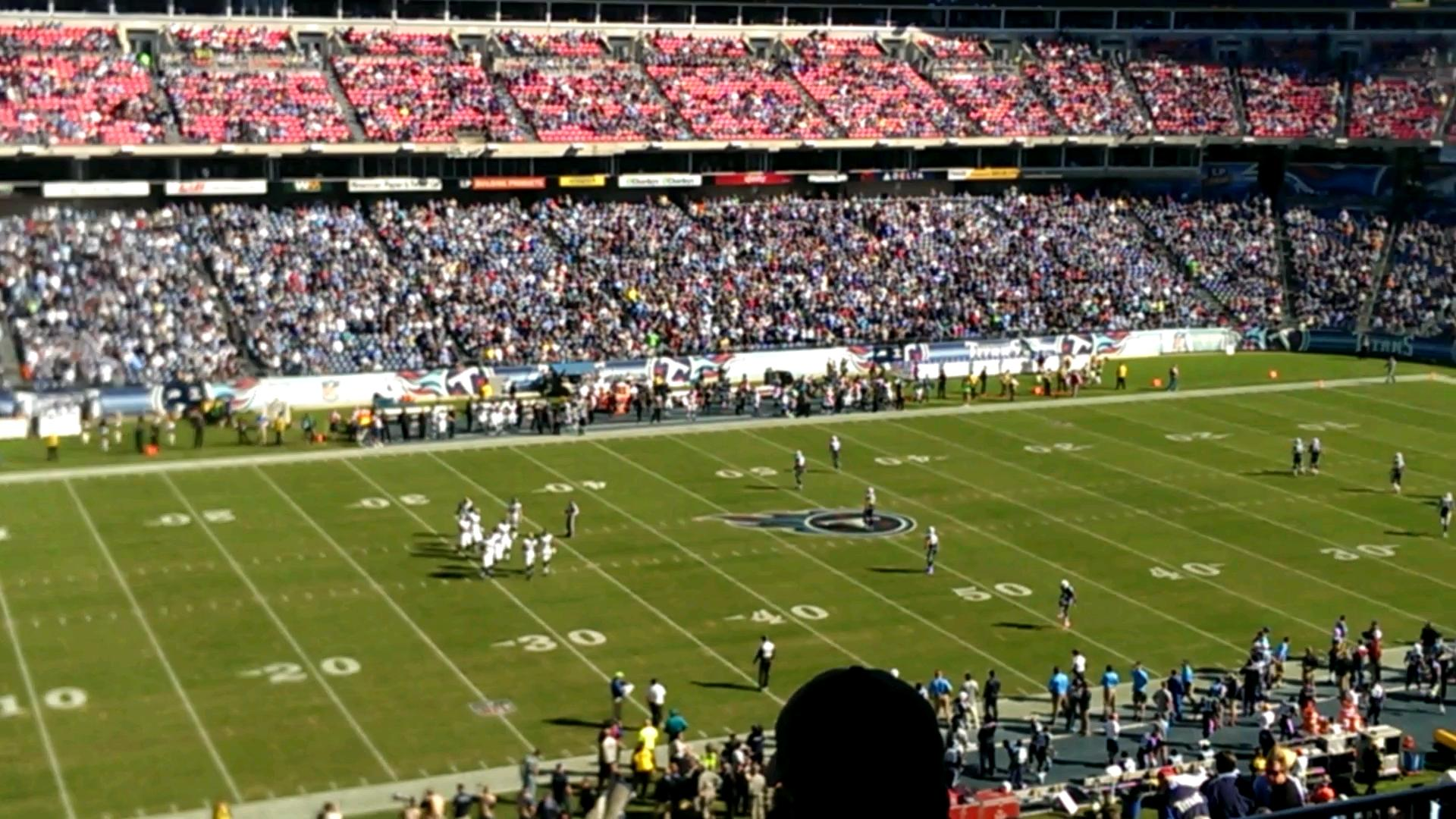
The Jacksonville Jaguars and Tennessee Titans prepare to kick off the first half at LP Field in Nashville, Tennessee, on Sunday, November 10, 2013

=== 1990s ===
In 1993, the NFL awarded expansion franchises to the cities of Charlotte, North Carolina, and Jacksonville, Florida. The Charlotte franchise would become the Carolina Panthers of the National Football Conference, and the Jacksonville franchise would become the Jacksonville Jaguars of the American Football Conference. The Jaguars would compete in the Central division of the AFC along with the Cincinnati Bengals, Cleveland Browns, Houston Oilers, and Pittsburgh Steelers. Since 1995, the Jaguars have played most of their home games at what was originally called Jacksonville Municipal Stadium (now named EverBank Stadium) on the site of the original Gator Bowl stadium.

On September 3, 1995, the Jaguars played their first ever regular season game in Jacksonville against the Oilers, who had existed since the founding of the American Football League in 1960. Houston receiver Haywood Jeffires caught the game's only touchdown in a 10–3 Oilers victory. Four weeks later, the clubs met again in Houston. In the fourth quarter, Desmond Howard caught a 15-yard pass from Jaguars quarterback Mark Brunell to lift Jacksonville to a 17–16 win. Following the 1995 season, Oilers owner Bud Adams confirmed that his team would relocate to Nashville, Tennessee in time for the 1998 season. The announcement resulted in low attendance at the Houston Astrodome and the loss of many of the Oilers' radio affiliates. In another meeting in Jacksonville on September 8, 1996, Brunell threw the Jaguars' game-winning touchdown to Keenan McCardell to secure a 34–27 victory. Three months later in front of an Astrodome crowd of only 20,196, Oilers quarterback Steve McNair collected 308 passing yards as he led Houston to a 23–17 victory. A year earlier than originally expected, the Oilers left Houston and moved their home games to the Liberty Bowl in Memphis, Tennessee. The Jaguars held off a second half rally by the Oilers to win in Memphis 30–24 on November 2, 1997. Two weeks later in Jacksonville, the Jaguars completed their sweep of the Oilers with a 17–9 win.

By the 1998 season, the Oilers were playing their home games in Nashville at Vanderbilt Stadium. In Nashville on September 27, 1998, two fourth quarter field goals by Jacksonville kicker Mike Hollis lifted the Jaguars to a 27–22 victory, their fourth straight against the Oilers. The streak ended on December 13 in Jacksonville when Al Del Greco's 41-yard field goal lifted the Oilers to a 16–13 win. The Jaguars won the AFC Central title in 1998 but lost in the playoffs to the New York Jets. For the 1999 season, the Oilers changed their name to the Tennessee Titans and began playing their home games at their new stadium, Adelphia Coliseum (now named Nissan Stadium). In Jacksonville on September 26, 1999, the Titans rallied from a 17–7 deficit to defeat the Jaguars 20–19. Three months later in Nashville the Titans dominated the Jaguars 41–14. Despite this result, Jacksonville won the AFC Central for a second consecutive season and finished the regular season with a 14–2 record, both losses to Tennessee. Jacksonville was the No. 1 seed in the AFC and had a first-round bye, but the No. 4 seed Tennessee, with a record of 13–3, hosted the Buffalo Bills in a wild card game. The Titans dramatically defeated the Bills 22–16 by means of the Music City Miracle play and traveled to Indianapolis the following weekend, where they defeated the Colts 19–16. Meanwhile, Jacksonville won its divisional round home game over the Miami Dolphins 62–7. On January 23, 2000, the Titans and Jaguars met for the third time in the 1999 season in Jacksonville for the AFC Championship Game. At halftime, the Jaguars led 14–10, but the Titans stormed back to win 33–14. For the first time since 1961, the franchise had won the AFL/AFC title. The Titans faced the St. Louis Rams in Super Bowl XXXIV, only to lose 23–16 in a game that came down to the final play.

=== 2000s ===
The Titans and Jaguars continued their late 1990s success into the early 2000s and remained competitive with one another, staying in the same division when the NFL realigned its divisions. The Jaguars and Titans joined the Indianapolis Colts and the newly-formed Houston Texans to form the AFC South. Though Brunell and McNair eventually left for other teams, they were eventually replaced at quarterback by David Garrard and Vince Young. Running backs Maurice Jones-Drew for the Jaguars and Chris Johnson for the Titans began playing in this decade, becoming two of the most dominant halfbacks in the league. However, the rise of the Colts led by Peyton Manning and a departure of talent from the Jaguars and Titans over the years led to a decline in the two teams' success towards the end of the 2000s, which allowed the Colts to dominate the AFC South throughout the 2000s. Until 2017, the Jaguars last made the playoffs in 2007 and the Titans last qualified in 2008.

=== 2010s ===
The Jaguars and Titans began this decade without much success, both missing the playoffs each year until 2017. Jaguars quarterback David Garrard was released after the 2010 season and replaced by 2011 draft pick Blaine Gabbert, who was ultimately unsuccessful during his tenure with the team. The Titans drafted quarterback Jake Locker in the same draft after releasing Vince Young due to offseason troubles, but injuries plagued Locker's career and he retired after only four years.

On December 22, 2013, Maurice Jones-Drew and Chris Johnson faced each other one final time at EverBank Field in Jacksonville, where the Titans won over the Jaguars 20–16. Jones-Drew last played for the Oakland Raiders in 2014, while Johnson later played for the New York Jets and Arizona Cardinals and is a free agent as of the end of 2017. On December 18, 2014, the 2–12 Jaguars defeated the 2–12 Titans 21–13 on Thursday Night Football in Jacksonville. The Titans' and Jaguars' respective coaching staffs faced off in the Senior Bowl on January 24, 2015. Ken Whisenhunt's staff coached the North while Gus Bradley's staff directed the South.

By 2015, Gabbert and Locker had been replaced by new quarterbacks Blake Bortles and Marcus Mariota on the Jaguars and Titans, respectively. After years of bottom feeding in the AFC South, the two teams took advantage of a Colts team missing their star quarterback Andrew Luck due to injury in 2017 and returned to the playoffs that year. Though the Jaguars had already clinched the AFC South, the Titans made it in by beating the Jaguars in week 17. Both teams would lose to the defending Super Bowl champion New England Patriots, with the Titans losing 35–14 in the divisional round, and the Jaguars losing 24–20 in the conference championship (after attaining a 20–10 4th quarter lead).

=== 2020s ===
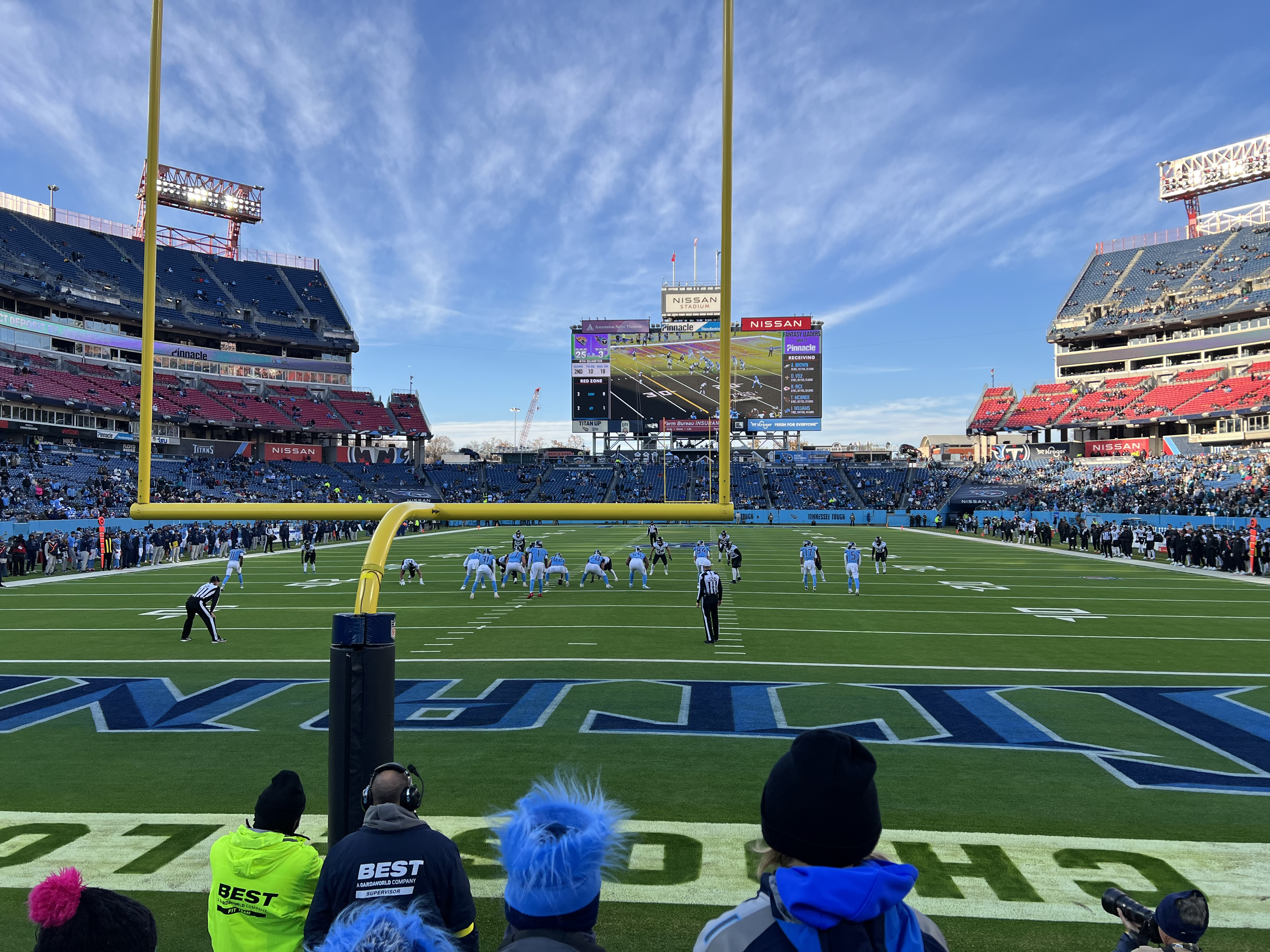
The Titans offense playing against the Jaguars defense in Nissan Stadium during Week 13 of the 2025 season.

After a couple of years of Titans dominance, 2022 saw both teams play each other late in the season with the AFC South in the balance. In week 14, the Jaguars defeated the Titans 36–22, capitalizing on four Titans turnovers to stay alive in the AFC South race. Both teams eventually battled for the AFC South division championship in week 18. The Titans got out to an early 10–0 lead, but the Jaguars forced a fumble on Joshua Dobbs in the fourth quarter that Josh Allen of the Jags returned for a touchdown to win the game 20-16 and get in the postseason.

In the 2023 finale, the Titans beat the Jaguars (who had lost four of their last five games heading into Week 18) to ensure that Jacksonville failed to win the AFC South and also miss the playoffs.

== Season-by-season results ==
Jacksonville Jaguars vs. Houston Oilers/Tennessee Oilers/Tennessee Titans Season-by-Season Results
1990s (Oilers/Titans, 6–5)

Season	Season series	at Jacksonville Jaguars	at Houston/Tennessee Oilers Tennessee Titans	Overall series	Notes
1995	Tie 1–1	Oilers; 10–3	Jaguars; 17–16	Tie; 1–1	Jaguars join the National Football League (NFL) as an expansion team. They were placed in the AFC Central, resulting in two meetings annually with the Oilers. Game in Jacksonville is the Jaguars' inaugural game. Jaguars' win against the Oilers is the franchise's first win.
1996	Tie 1–1	Oilers; 34–27	Jaguars; 23–17	Tie; 2–2	Last season Oilers played as a Houston-based team.
1997	Jaguars 2–0	Jaguars; 17–9	Jaguars; 30–24	Jaguars; 4–2	Oilers relocate to Memphis, Tennessee and play at Liberty Bowl.
1998	Tie 1–1	Oilers; 16–13	Jaguars; 27–22	Jaguars; 5–3	Oilers relocate to Nashville and play at Vanderbilt Stadium (now known as FirstBank Stadium). Last season the Oilers played under the "Oilers" name.
1999	Titans 2–0	Titans; 20–19	Titans; 41–14	Tie; 5–5	Oilers renamed to the "Tennessee Titans". Titans open Adelphia Coliseum (now known as Nissan Stadium). In Tennessee, the Titans recorded their largest victory against the Jaguars with a 27–point differential. Jaguars finish the season with a 14–2 record, with both losses coming against the Titans.
1999 playoffs	Titans 1–0	Titans; 33–14	—N/a	Titans; 6–5	AFC Championship Game. Jaguars finish 0–3 against the Titans but 15–0 against the rest of the NFL. Titans go on to lose Super Bowl XXXIV.

2000s (Titans, 12–8)

Season	Season series	at Jacksonville Jaguars	at Tennessee Titans	Overall series	Notes
2000	Tie 1–1	Jaguars; 16–13	Titans; 27–13	Titans; 7–6	
2001	Tie 1–1	Jaguars; 13–6	Titans; 28–24	Titans; 8–7	
2002	Titans 2–0	Titans; 28–10	Titans; 23–14	Titans; 10–7	During the NFL realignment, the Jaguars and Titans are placed in the newly created AFC South.
2003	Titans 2–0	Titans; 30–17	Titans; 10–3	Titans; 12–7	
2004	Tied 1–1	Titans; 18–15	Jaguars; 15–12	Titans; 13–8	
2005	Jaguars 2–0	Jaguars; 40–13	Jaguars; 31–28	Titans; 13–10	In Jacksonville, the Jaguars scored their most points in a game against the Titans.
2006	Tie 1–1	Jaguars; 37–7	Titans; 24–17	Titans; 14–11	In Jacksonville, the Jaguars recorded their largest victory against the Titans with a 30–point differential.
2007	Tied 1–1	Titans; 13–10	Jaguars; 28–13	Titans; 15–12	
2008	Titans 2–0	Titans; 24–14	Titans; 17–10	Titans; 17–12	
2009	Tie 1–1	Jaguars; 37–17	Titans; 30–13	Titans; 18–13	

2010s (Titans, 12–8)

Season	Season series	at Jacksonville Jaguars	at Tennessee Titans	Overall series	Notes
2010	Tie 1–1	Titans; 30–3	Jaguars; 17–6	Titans; 19–14	In Jacksonville, the Titans tied their largest victory against the Jaguars with a 27–point differential (1999).
2011	Tie 1–1	Jaguars; 16–14	Titans; 23–17	Titans; 20–15	
2012	Tie 1–1	Jaguars; 24–19	Titans; 38–20	Titans; 21–16	Jaguars' win was their only home win in the 2012 season. Following that win, they went on a 13-game losing streak.
2013	Tie 1–1	Titans; 20–16	Jaguars; 29–27	Titans; 22–17	Jaguars' win snapped a 13-game losing streak and earned them their first win of the season after an 0–8 start.
2014	Tie 1–1	Jaguars; 21–13	Titans; 16–14	Titans; 23–18	Titans' win would be their last win of the season, as they ended the season on a 10‑game losing streak.
2015	Tie 1–1	Jaguars; 19–13	Titans; 42–39	Titans; 24–19	In Tennessee, the Titans scored their most points in a game against the Jaguars.
2016	Tie 1–1	Jaguars; 38–17	Titans; 36–22	Titans; 25–20	Both teams split the season series for eight consecutive years.
2017	Titans 2–0	Titans; 37–16	Titans; 15–10	Titans; 27–20	Titans' loss to the Rams resulted in the Jaguars clinching their first AFC South title and first division title since the 1999 season. In Tennessee, the Titans clinched their first playoff berth since the 2008 season with their win. Both teams end 8+ season playoff droughts this season. Starting with their loss in Tennessee, the Jaguars went on a 14-game losing streak against divisional opponents.
2018	Titans 2–0	Titans; 9–6	Titans; 30–9	Titans; 29–20	In Tennessee, Titans' RB Derrick Henry ran for a 99-yard touchdown, tying an NFL record.
2019	Tie 1–1	Jaguars; 20–7	Titans; 42–20	Titans; 30–21	In Tennessee, the Titans tied their most points scored in a game against the Jaguars (2015).

2020s (Jaguars, 8–5)

Season	Season series	at Jacksonville Jaguars	at Tennessee Titans	Overall series	Notes
2020	Titans 2–0	Titans; 31–10	Titans; 33–30	Titans; 32–21	Starting with their loss in Tennessee, the Jaguars went on a 20-game losing streak.
2021	Titans 2–0	Titans; 37–19	Titans; 20–0	Titans; 34–21	Titans win 8 straight home meetings (2014–2021).
2022	Jaguars 2–0	Jaguars; 20–16	Jaguars; 36–22	Titans; 34–23	In Tennessee, the Jaguars snapped a 14-game road losing streak against AFC South divisional opponents with their win. In Jacksonville, the Jaguars clinched the AFC South title, eliminated the Titans from playoff contention, and recorded their first season series sweep against the Titans since the 2005 season with their win.
2023	Tie 1–1	Jaguars; 34–14	Titans; 28–20	Titans; 35–24	Titans eliminated the Jaguars from playoff contention with their win.
2024	Jaguars 2–0	Jaguars; 20–13	Jaguars; 10–6	Titans; 35–26	In Tennessee, the Jaguars eliminated the Titans from playoff contention with their win.
2025	Jaguars 2–0	Jaguars; 25–3	Jaguars; 41–7	Titans; 35–28	In Tennessee, the Jaguars eliminated the Titans from playoff contention with their win. In Jacksonville, the Jaguars clinch the AFC South title, record their largest victory over the Titans with a 34–point differential and score their most points in a game against the Titans.
2026	Jaguars 1–0	November 29	Jaguars; 40–23	Titans; 35–29	

Summary of Results

Season	Season series	at Jacksonville Jaguars	at Houston/Tennessee Oilers Tennessee Titans	Notes
Regular season	Titans 34–29	Tie 15–15	Titans 19–14	
Postseason	Titans 1–0	Titans 1–0	no games	AFC Championship: 1999
Regular and postseason	Titans 35–29	Titans 16–15	Titans 19–14	Jaguars have a 2–0 record in Houston and 1–0 record in Memphis (1997).

== See also ==
- List of NFL rivalries
- AFC South
